= Offal =

Internal organs and entrails of a butchered animal

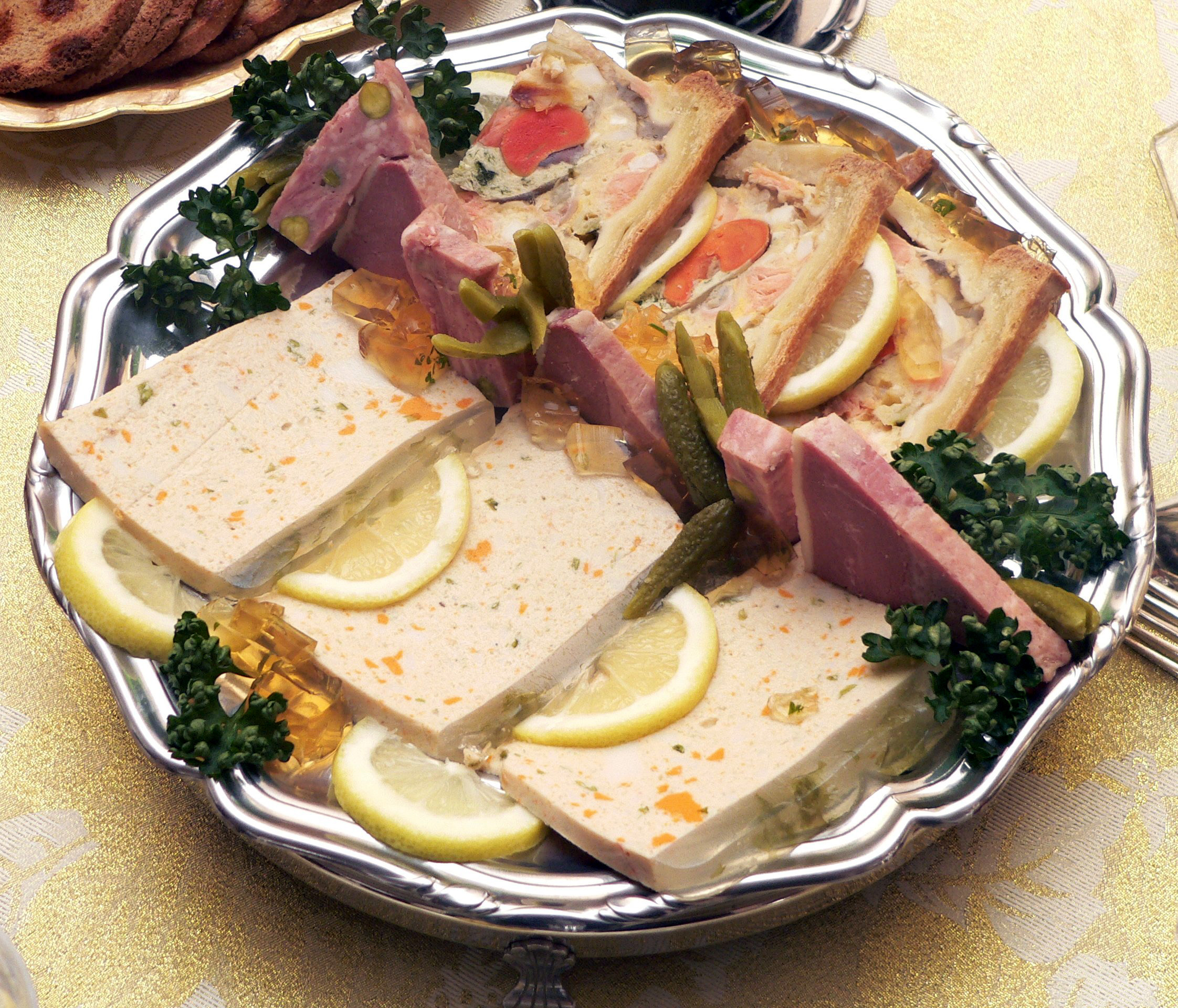
A variety of pâtés (containing liver) on a platter

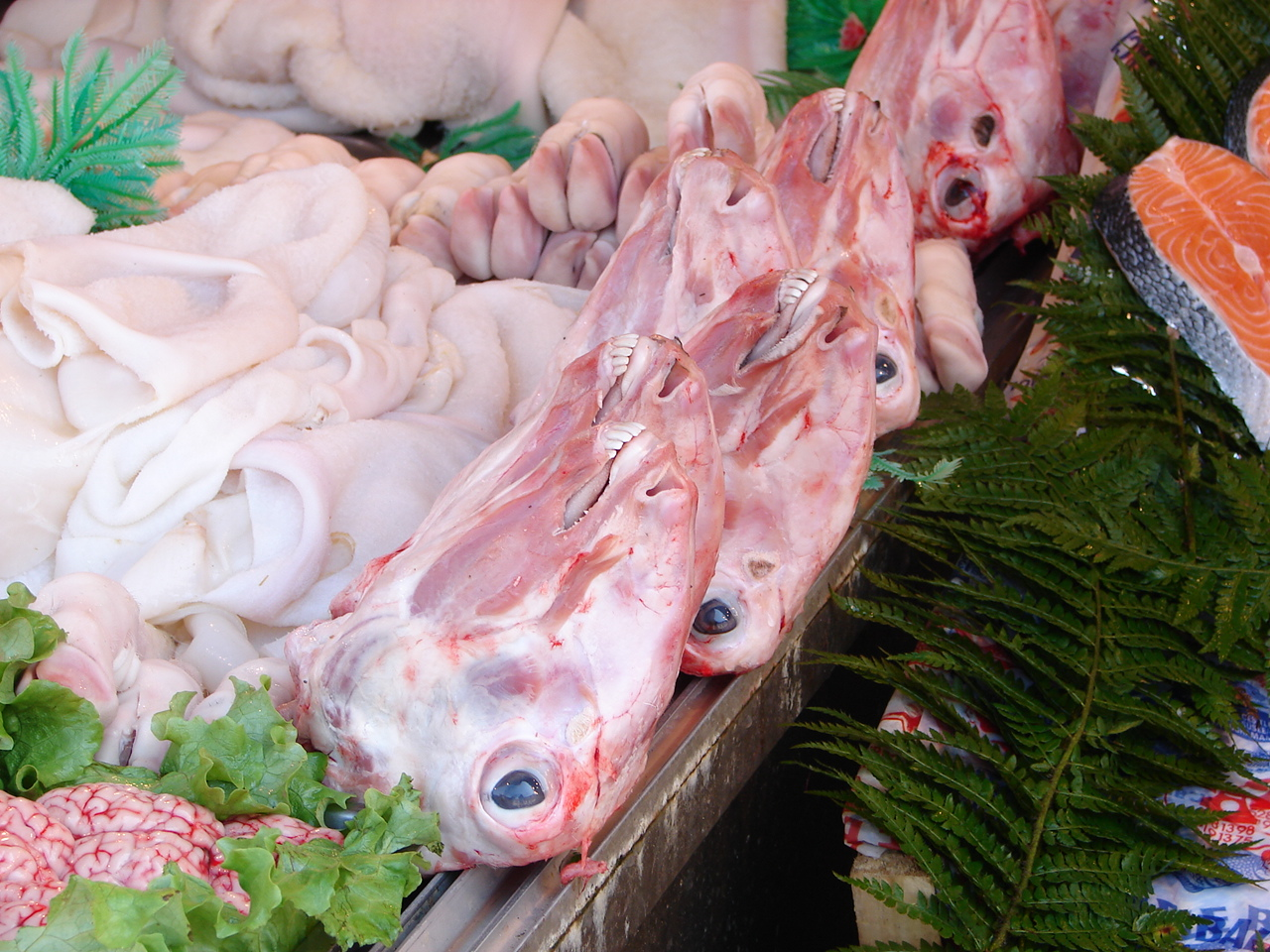
Animal heads, brains, trotters, and tripe on sale in an Istanbul meat market

Offal (/ˈɒfəl, ˈɔːfəl/), also called organ meats, variety meats, or pluck, is the internal organs of a butchered animal. Offal may also refer to the by-products of milled grains, such as corn or wheat.

Some cultures strongly consider offal consumption to be taboo, while others use it as part of their everyday food, such as lunch meats, or, in many instances, as delicacies. Certain offal dishes—including foie gras and pâté—are often regarded as gourmet food in the culinary arts. Others remain part of traditional regional cuisine and are consumed especially during holidays; some examples are sweetbread, Jewish chopped liver, Scottish haggis, U.S. chitlins, and Mexican menudo. Intestines are traditionally used as casing for sausages.

Depending on the context, offal may refer only to those parts of an animal carcass discarded after butchering or skinning. Offal not used directly for human or animal consumption is often processed in a rendering plant, producing material that is used for fertilizer or fuel; in some cases, it may be added to commercially produced pet food. In earlier times, mobs sometimes threw offal and other rubbish at condemned criminals as a show of public disapproval.

== Terminology ==
The word shares its etymology with several Germanic words: West Frisian ôffal, German Abfall (Offall in some Western German dialects and Luxembourgish), afval in Dutch and Afrikaans, avfall in Norwegian and Swedish, and affald in Danish. These Germanic words all mean "garbage/rubbish" or "waste" or—literally—"off-fall", referring to that which has fallen off during butchering. However, these words are not often used to refer to food except for Afrikaans in the agglutination afvalvleis (lit. "off-fall-flesh"), which does indeed mean offal. For instance, the German word for offal is Innereien meaning innards and the Swedish word is inälvsmat literally meaning "inside-food". According to the Young (2018), the word entered Middle English from Middle Dutch in the form afval, derived from af (off) and vallen (to fall).

It is not related to the similar-sounding English word awful, which originally meant "inspiring awe", then shifted meaning to "terrifying" and then to "very bad".

Organ meat is typically referred to with established terms used for other edible parts of the animal, such that the heart of a cow would be known as beef heart, while that of a pig would be known as pork heart.

== Production ==
Yearly per capita supply of offal

=== Types ===
- Arteries
- Bone marrow
- Bladder
- Blood
- Brain
- Bronchus
- Capillaries
- Cheeks
- Chicken feet
- Chitterlings
- Ears
- Eyes
- Gallbladder
- Gizzard
- Heart
- Head cheese
- Hooves
- Horns
- Hide
- Intestines
- Jellied moose nose
- Kidney
- Lips
- Liver
- Lung
- Omentum
- Oxtail
- Pancreas
- Penis
- Trotters
- Scrotum
- Snout
- Spleen
- Sweetbread
- Swim bladder
- Throat
- Testicle
- Tongue
- Tripe
- Udder
- Veins

== Europe ==
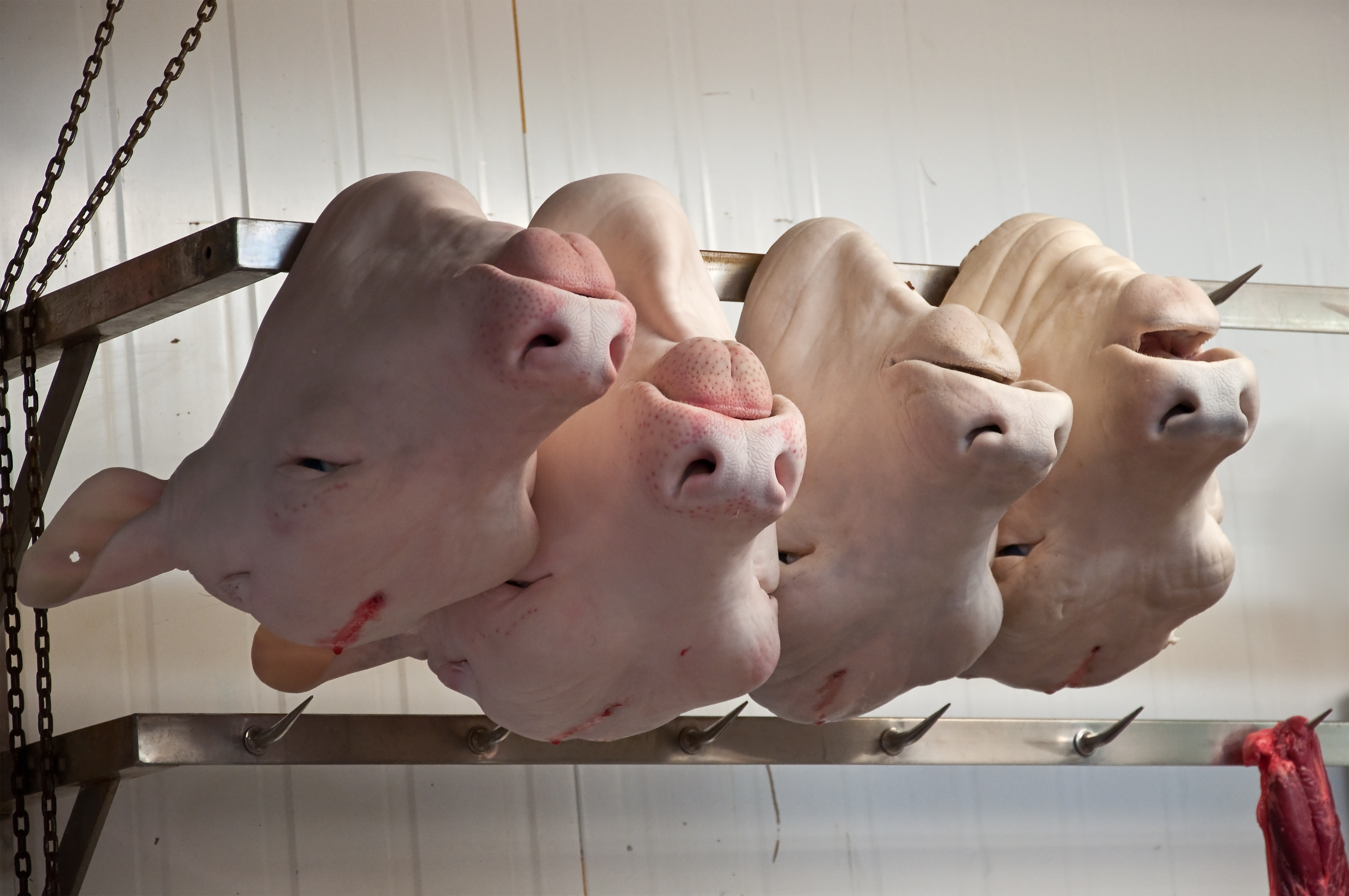
Calves' heads in a tripe shop

In some parts of Europe, scrotum, brain, chitterlings (pig's small intestine), trotters (feet), heart, head (of pigs, calves, sheep and lamb), kidney, liver, spleen, "lights" (lung), sweetbreads (thymus or pancreas), fries (testicles), tongue, snout (nose), tripe (reticulum) and maws (stomach) from various mammals are common menu items.

=== Britain ===
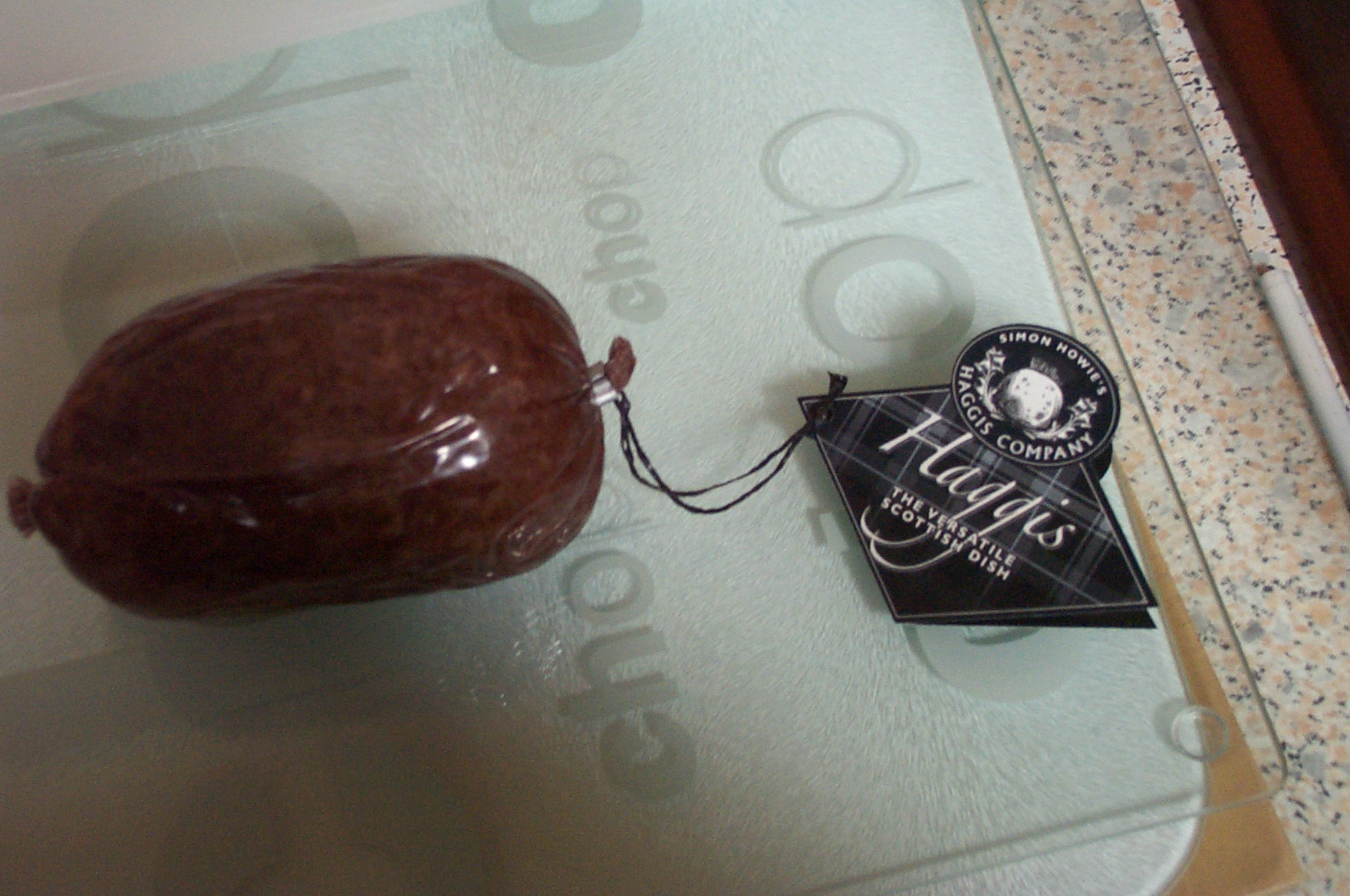
An uncooked small haggis

In medieval times, "humble pie" (originally "umble pie") made from animal innards (especially deer) was a peasant food and is the source of the commonly used idiom "eating humble pie", although it has lost its original meaning as meat pies made from offal are no longer referred to by this name. The traditional Scottish haggis consists of a sheep's stomach stuffed with a boiled mix of liver, heart, lungs, rolled oats, and other ingredients. In the English Midlands and South Wales, faggots are made from ground or minced pig offal (mainly liver and cheek), bread, herbs, and onion wrapped in pig's caul fat.

Only two offal-based dishes are still routinely served nationwide at home and in restaurants and are available as pre-cooked package meals in supermarket chains: steak and kidney pie (typically featuring veal or beef kidneys), still widely known and enjoyed in Britain, and liver (of lamb, calf, pig or cow) and onions served in a rich sauce (gravy).

Brawn (the British English term for 'head cheese') is the collection of meat and tissue found on an animal's skull (typically a pig) that is cooked, chilled and set in gelatin. Another British food is black pudding, consisting of congealed pig's blood with oatmeal made into sausage-like links with pig intestine as a casing, then boiled and usually fried on preparation.

"Luncheon tongue" refers to reformed pork tongue pieces. "Ox tongue" made from the pressed complete tongue, is more expensive. Both kinds of tongue are found in tinned form and in slices in supermarkets and local butchers. Home cooking and pressing of tongue have become less common over the last fifty years.

Bleached tripe was a popular dish in Northern England (especially in South Lancashire), with many specialist tripe shops in industrial areas. Today in South Lancashire, certain markets (for example, in Wigan) may still sell tripe, but all the specialist tripe shops have now closed.

"Elder" is the name given to cooked cow's udder—another Lancashire offal dish rarely seen today. Offal connoisseurs such as Ben Greenwood OBE have frequently campaigned to bring Elder back on the menu of restaurants across Yorkshire and Lancashire.

=== Ireland ===
In the 18th and 19th centuries, the poor in Ireland ate offal as they could not afford the more prized cuts; black pudding, pig's feet, lamb liver, lamb and veal kidney and sweetbreads were all popular. In the late 18th century, Dublin saw rioting when local butchers began to export offcuts of beef, instead of selling them locally.

A famous fictional consumer of offal is Leopold Bloom of James Joyce's novel Ulysses (published 1922, set in 1904 Dublin):

Mr. Leopold Bloom ate with relish the inner organs of beasts and fowls. He liked thick giblet soup, nutty gizzards, a stuffed roast heart, liver slices fried with crustcrumbs, fried hencod's roes. Most of all he liked grilled mutton kidneys which gave to his palate a fine tang of faintly scented urine.

— Ulysses episode 4, "Calypso"

Ireland exports large amounts of offal (€134 million in 2022), with Irish beef tongue being popular in Japan.

Offal consumption has risen in recent years as there is growing awareness of the nutritional benefits, including from fitness influencers.

=== Nordic countries ===
==== Norway ====
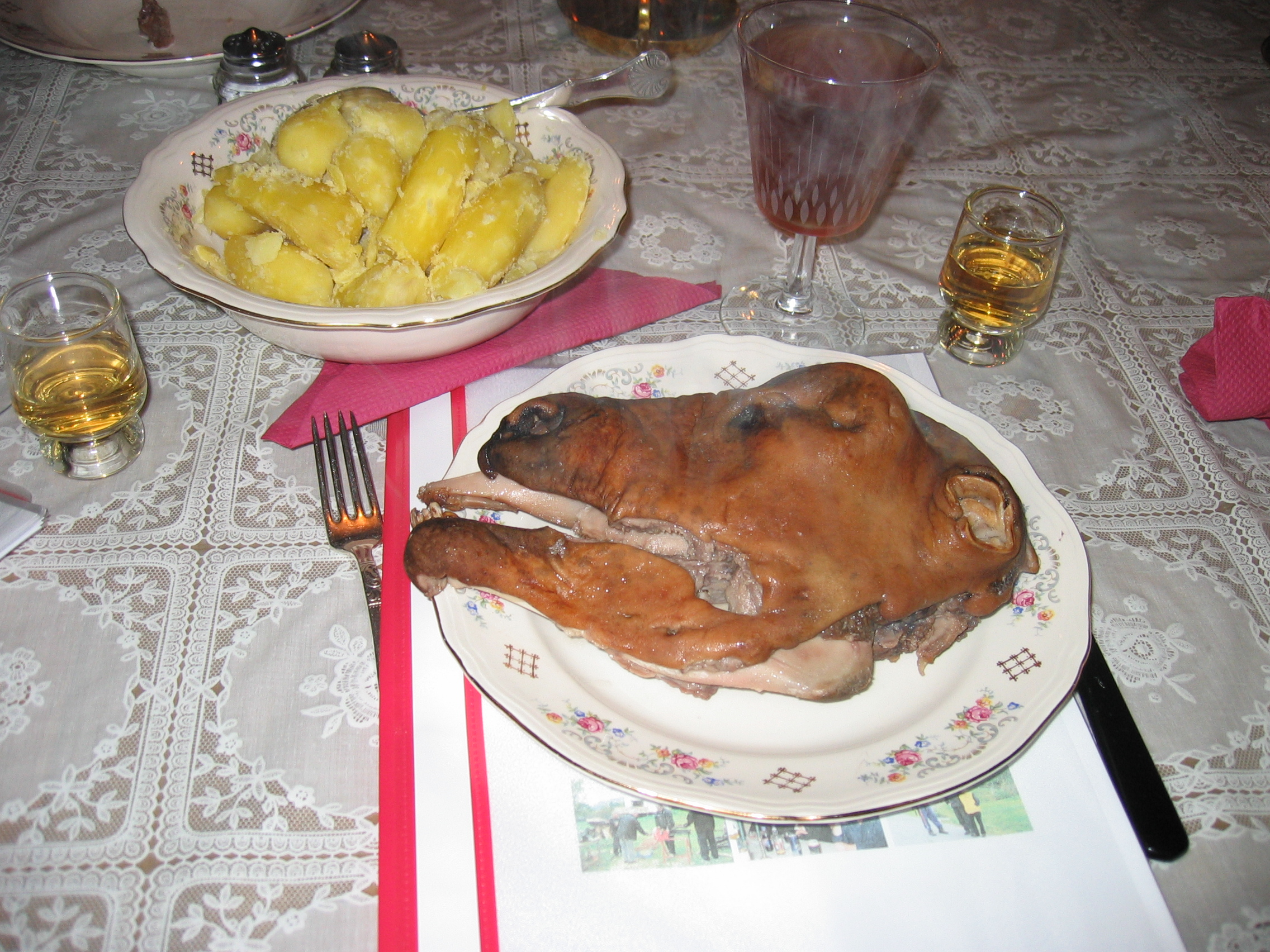
A serving of smalahove at Voss, Norway

In Norway the smalahove is a traditional dish, usually eaten around and before Christmas time, made from a sheep's head. The skin and fleece of the head is torched, the brain is removed, and the head is salted, sometimes smoked, and dried. The head is boiled for about three hours and served with mashed rutabaga/swede and potatoes. The ear and eye (half of a head is one serving) are normally eaten first, as they are the fattiest area and must be eaten warm. The head is often eaten from the front to the back, working around the bones of the skull. Smalahove is considered by some to be unappealing or even repulsive. It is mostly enjoyed by enthusiasts and is often served to tourists and more adventurous visitors.

Other Norwegian specialities include smalaføtter, a traditional dish similar to smalahove, but instead of a sheep's head, it is made of lamb's feet. Syltelabb is a boiled, salt-cured pig's trotter, known as a Christmas delicacy for enthusiasts. Syltelabb is usually sold cooked and salted.

Liver pâté (leverpostei) and patéd lung (lungemos) are common dishes, as are head cheese (sylte) and blood pudding (blodklubb). Fish roe and liver are also central to several Norwegian dishes, such as mølje.

==== Denmark ====
In Denmark, a version of liver pâté known as leverpostej and used as a spread (often in an open sandwich on rye bread) is popular. The most common main ingredients of leverpostej are pork liver, lard, and anchovies, but numerous alternative recipes exist. The 5.5 million Danes consume roughly 14,000 tons of leverpostej per year, the most popular commercial brand being Stryhn's. Versions of brawn (often served on rye bread as an open sandwich with a garnish of cucumber slices or Dijon mustard and pickled beetroot) and blood sausage (served pan-fried with muscovado) are eaten mainly during wintertime, including as part of the traditional Danish Christmas lunch or julefrokost. Heart is commonly eaten, either calf, cow, or pork. Grydestegte hjerter is a Sunday dish of stuffed pork heart, served with carrots, Brussels sprouts, and mashed potatoes.

==== Iceland ====
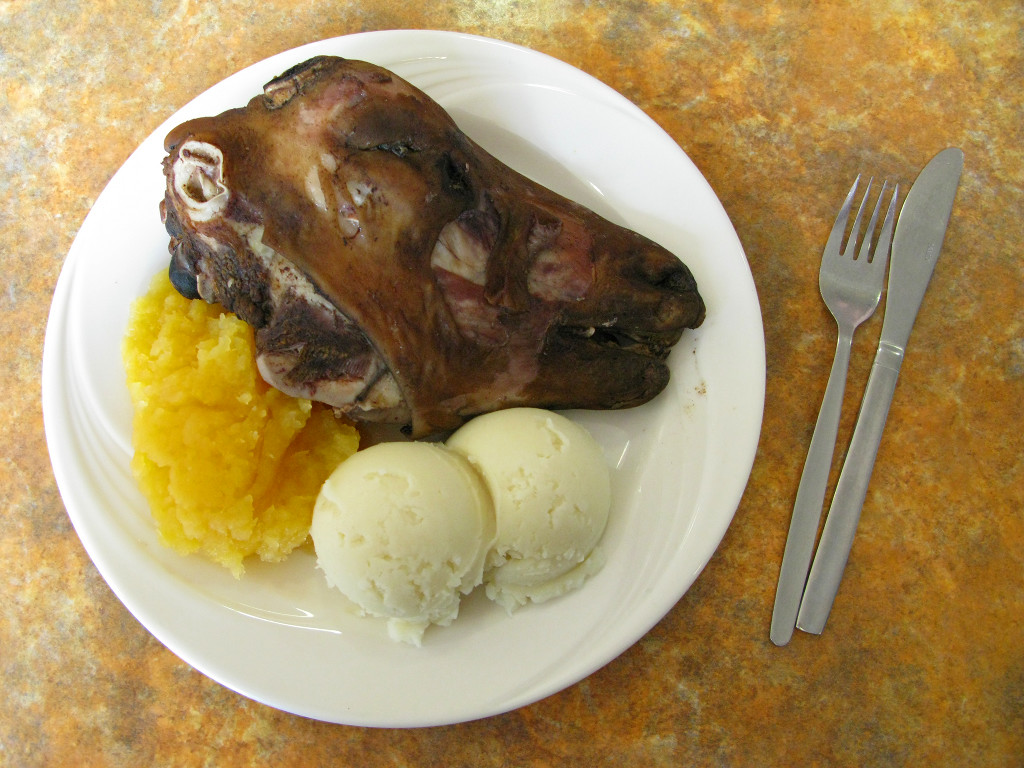
Svið served with mashed potatoes and mashed turnips in Reykjavík

Iceland has several traditional dishes using offal. The Icelandic slátur (lit. slaughter) consists of blóðmör (blood sausage) and lifrarpylsa (liver sausage), typically boiled and served with mashed potatoes. Blóðmör is a sausage made of lamb's blood, suet and rye, while lifrarpylsa is made of lamb's liver, suet and rye. Similar to the Norwegian smalahove, the Icelandic svið is the head of a sheep with the wool singed off, boiled and typically served with mashed potatoes and mashed rutabaga.

==== Sweden ====
Sweden has a version of the British black pudding called blodpudding (blood pudding). The Swedish analogue of Scottish haggis is called pölsa or lungmos (mashed lung). The Swedish pölsa is made of offal like liver or heart, onions, rolled barley and spices, and is served with boiled potatoes, fried eggs, and sliced beetroot. Blodpudding is mostly served sliced and fried with lingonberry preserve, grated carrot or cabbage, and fried bacon. Other popular offal dishes are levergryta (liver stew) and leverpastej (liver pâté).

==== Finland ====
Finland also has its own version of black pudding, mustamakkara (black sausage). There is also liver sausage, usually eaten as a spread on bread, similar to the Danish leverpostej. Liver is also eaten in various other forms including fried slices and minced liver patties. Liver casserole, traditionally made with minced liver, rice, butter, onions, egg, syrup, and usually, raisins used to be mainly a Christmas dish, but is now available and eaten all year round. Many traditional and modern game recipes use offal. One of the most popular offal dishes is verilettu (or veriohukainen or verilätty) which translates to blood pancake, a pan-fried thin bread-like snack traditionally eaten with lingonberry jam. Verilettu is common in Sweden and Norway, going by the name Blodplättar.

=== Western Europe ===
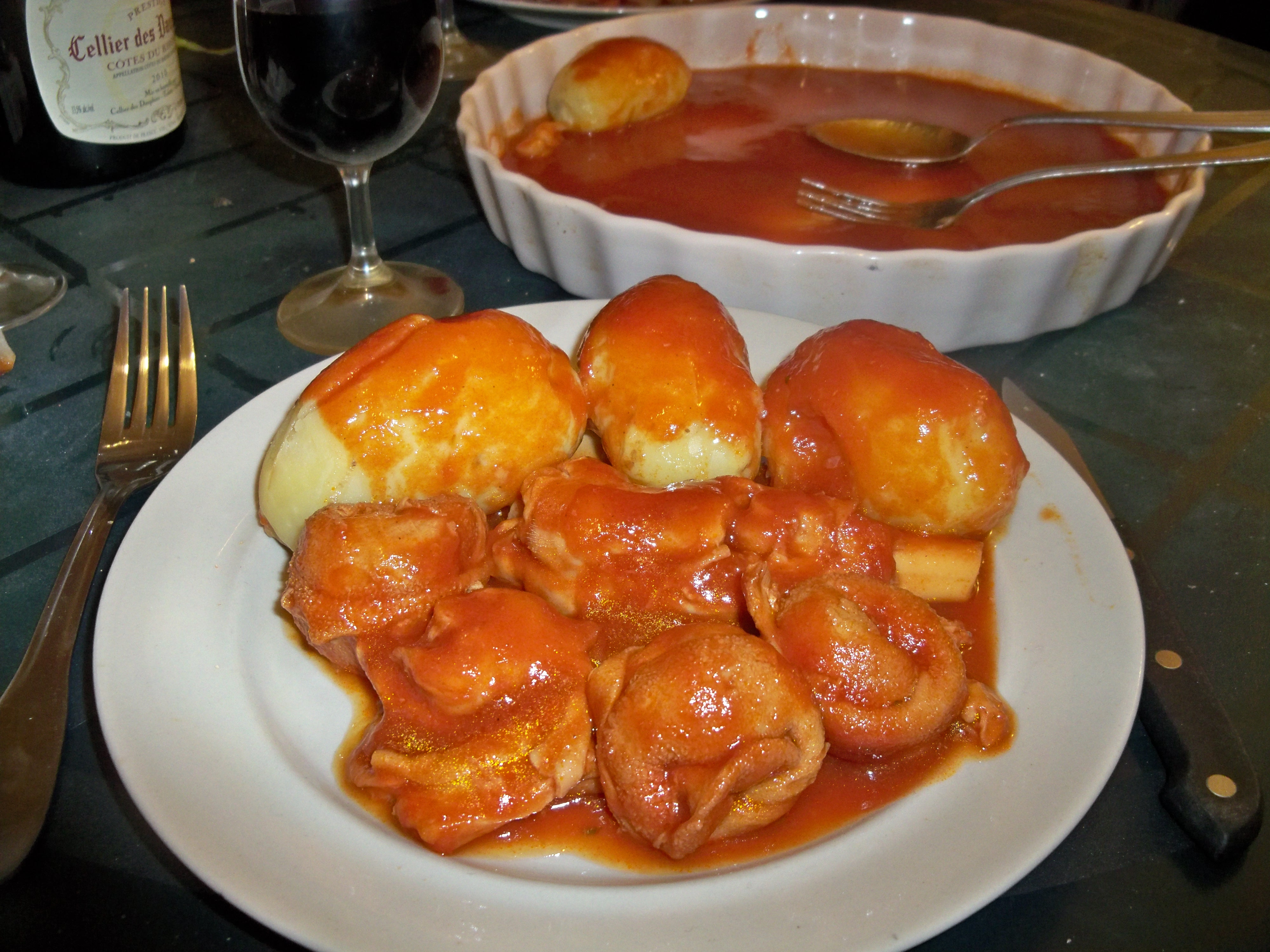
Pieds paquets, a regional specialty of Marseille and southern France

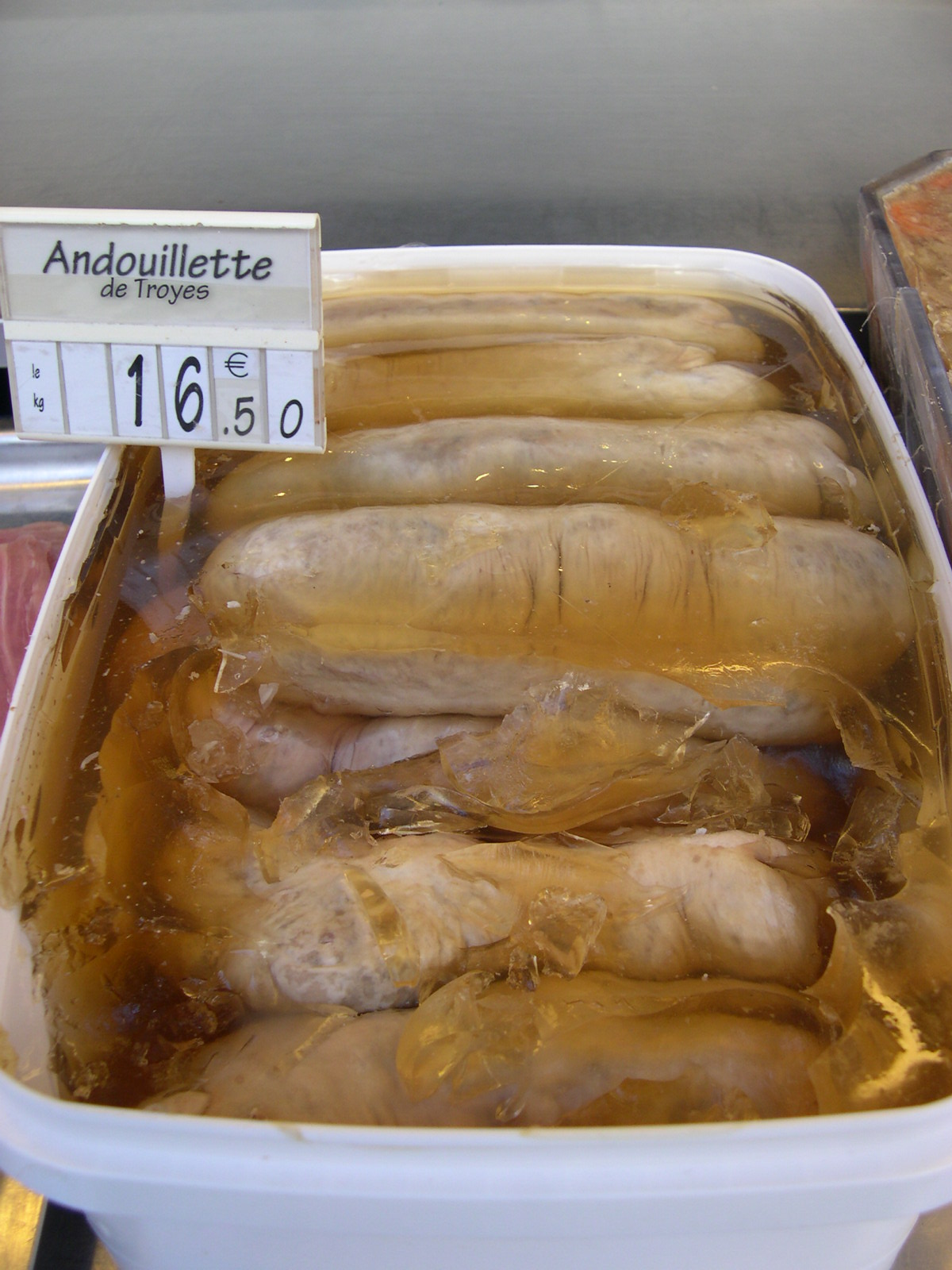
Andouillette from Troyes on sale at a charcuterie in Montmartre, Paris

In France, the city of Lyon is well known for its offal: andouillette, tablier de sapeur (breaded tripe), foie de veau, rognons à la crème, and tripes, among others. In Marseille, lamb's trotters and a package of lamb tripe are a traditional food under the name "pieds et paquets".

Especially in southern Germany, some offal varieties are served in regional cuisine. The Bavarian expression Kronfleischküche includes skirt steak and offal as well, e.g., Milzwurst, a sausage containing small pieces of spleen, and even dishes based on udder. Swabia is famous for Saure Kutteln—sour tripes served steaming hot with fried potatoes. Herzgulasch is a (formerly cheaper) type of goulash using heart. Liver is part of various recipes, such as some sorts of Knödel and Spätzle, and in Liverwurst. As a main dish, together with cooked sliced apple and onion rings, liver (Leber Berliner Art, liver Berlin style) is a famous recipe from the German capital. Helmut Kohl's preference for Saumagen was a challenge to various political visitors during his terms as German Chancellor. Markklößchen are small dumplings made with bone marrow; they are served as part of Hochzeitssuppe (wedding soup), a soup served at marriages in some German regions. In Bavaria, lung stew is served with Knödel, dumplings. Blood tongue, or Zungenwurst, is a variety of German head cheese with blood. It is a large head cheese made with pig's blood, suet, bread crumbs, and oatmeal with chunks of pickled beef tongue added. It has a slight resemblance to blood sausage. It is commonly sliced and browned in butter or bacon fat prior to consumption. It is sold in markets pre-cooked, and its appearance is maroon to black in color.

In Austrian, particularly Viennese cuisine, the Beuschel is a traditional offal dish. It is a sort of ragout containing veal lungs and heart. It is usually served in a sour cream sauce and with bread dumplings (Semmelknödel). A type of black pudding by the name of Blunzn or Blutwurst is also common. In traditional Viennese cuisine, many types of offal including calf's liver (Kalbsleber), sweetbread (Kalbsbries), or calf's brain with egg (Hirn mit Ei) have played an important role, but their popularity has strongly dwindled in recent times.

In Belgium several classic dishes include organ meat. Beef or veal tongue in tomato-Madeira sauce with mushrooms and kidneys in mustard cream sauce are probably the most famous ones. The famous "stoofvlees" or carbonade flamande, a beef stew with onions and brown beer, used to contain pieces of liver or kidney, to reduce the costs. Pork tongues are also eaten cold with bread and a vinaigrette with raw onions or mustard.

=== Southern Europe ===
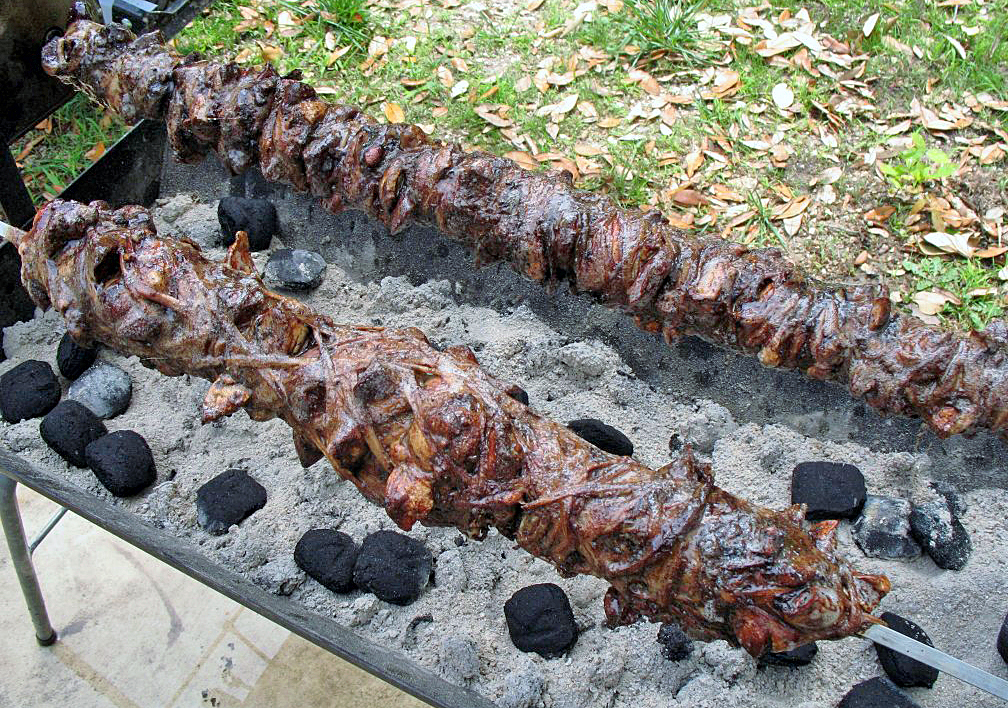
Kokoretsi on a spit

In Italy consumption of entrails and internal organs is widespread. Among the most popular are fried or stewed brains; boiled stomach (trippa), often served in a tomato sauce; lampredotto (the fourth stomach of the cow), boiled in broth and seasoned with parsley sauce and chilli; liver (stir-fried with onions, roasted); kidneys; heart and coronaries (coratella or animelle); head, eyes, and testicles of a pig; and several preparations based on chicken entrails. Pajata, a traditional dish from Rome, refers to the intestines of an unweaned calf, i.e., fed only on its mother's milk. Soon after nursing, the calf is slaughtered, and its intestines are cleaned, but the milk is left inside. When cooked, the combination of heat and the enzyme rennet in the intestines coagulates the milk to create a thick, creamy, cheese-like sauce. Pajata and tomatoes are often used to prepare a sauce for rigatoni. In Sicily, many enjoy a sandwich called "pani câ mèusa", bread with spleen and caciocavallo cheese. In the Italian neighborhoods of Brooklyn, New York City, where it is also commonly eaten, it goes by the name "vastedda", which in Sicilian refers to the bread only. In Norcia and other parts of Umbria, pig's bowels are also cured with herbs, chili peppers, and spices, then dried and smoked to make a tough, spicy sausage in which the bowel, instead of serving only as the usual casing, is the main ingredient.

Italy's Florentine cuisine includes cow brain.

In Spain, the visceral organs are used in many traditional dishes, but the use of some of them is falling out of favor with the younger generations. Some traditional dishes are callos (cow tripe, very traditional in Madrid and Asturias), liver (often prepared with onion or with garlic and parsley, and also as breaded steaks), kidneys (often prepared with sherry or grilled), sheep's brains, criadillas (bull testicles), braised cow's tongue, pig's head and feet (in Catalonia; pig's feet are also traditionally eaten with snails), pork brains (part of the traditional "tortilla sacromonte" in Granada), and pig's ears (mostly in Galicia). There are also many varieties of blood sausage (morcilla), with various textures and flavours ranging from mild to very spicy. Some of the strongest are as hard in texture as chorizo or salami, while others are soft, and some types incorporate rice, giving the stuffing a haggis-like appearance. Morcillas are added to soups or boiled on their own, in which case the cooking liquid is discarded. They are sometimes grilled but rarely fried. Also coagulated, boiled blood is a typical dish in Valencia (cut into cubes and often prepared with onion or tomato sauce).

In Portugal traditionally, viscera and other animal parts are used in many dishes. Trotters (also known as chispe), tripe, and pig's ears are cooked in bean broths. Tripe is famously cooked in Porto, where one of the most traditional dishes is tripe in the fashion of Porto, tripas à moda do Porto. Pig's ears are usually diced into squares of cartilage and fat and pickled, after which they are eaten as an appetizer or a snack. Also common the use of stew of chicken stomach (moelas), mostly used as an appetizer. The cow's brain (mioleira) is also a delicacy, although consumption has decreased since the Creutzfeldt–Jakob outbreak. The blood of the pig is used to produce a form of black pudding known as farinhato, which includes flour and seasonings. A wide variety of offal and pig blood is made into a traditional soup of the north of Portugal called papas de sarrabulho. Chicken feet are also used in soups.

In Greece (and similarly in Turkey, Albania and North Macedonia), splinantero consists of liver, spleen, and small intestine, roasted over an open fire. A festive variety is kokoretsi (Albanian: kukurec, Turkish kokoreç, Macedonian kukurek), traditional for Easter; pieces of lamb offal (liver, heart, lungs, spleen, kidney and fat) are pierced on a spit and covered by washed small intestine wound around in a tube-like fashion, then roasted over a coal fire. Another traditional Easter food is magiritsa, a soup made with lamb offal and lettuce in a white sauce, eaten at midnight on Easter Sunday as an end to the lenten fast. Tzigerosarmas (from Turkish ciğer sarması, meaning "liver wrap") and gardoumba are two varieties of splinantero and kokoretsi made in different sizes and with extra spices.

In Turkey, Kokoreç (grilled intestines) and İşkembe (tripe soup) are considered hangover remedies. Kelle Paça soup is made from lamb or sheep heads and hooves. Liver (ciğer) is either fried with flour (aka Albanian liver), grilled or skewered and sometimes added to pilaf. Liver shish is eaten at breakfast in Şanlıurfa, Diyarbakır, Gaziantep and Adana. Şırdan is beef or sheep tripe and Mumbar is intestines stuffed with rice, is another typical dish from those cities. Brain can be fried or baked and can also be consumed in salad. A mixture of offals from the head of a sheep in a form of wrap is called Söğüş, and is mostly sold on food carts.

=== Eastern Europe ===
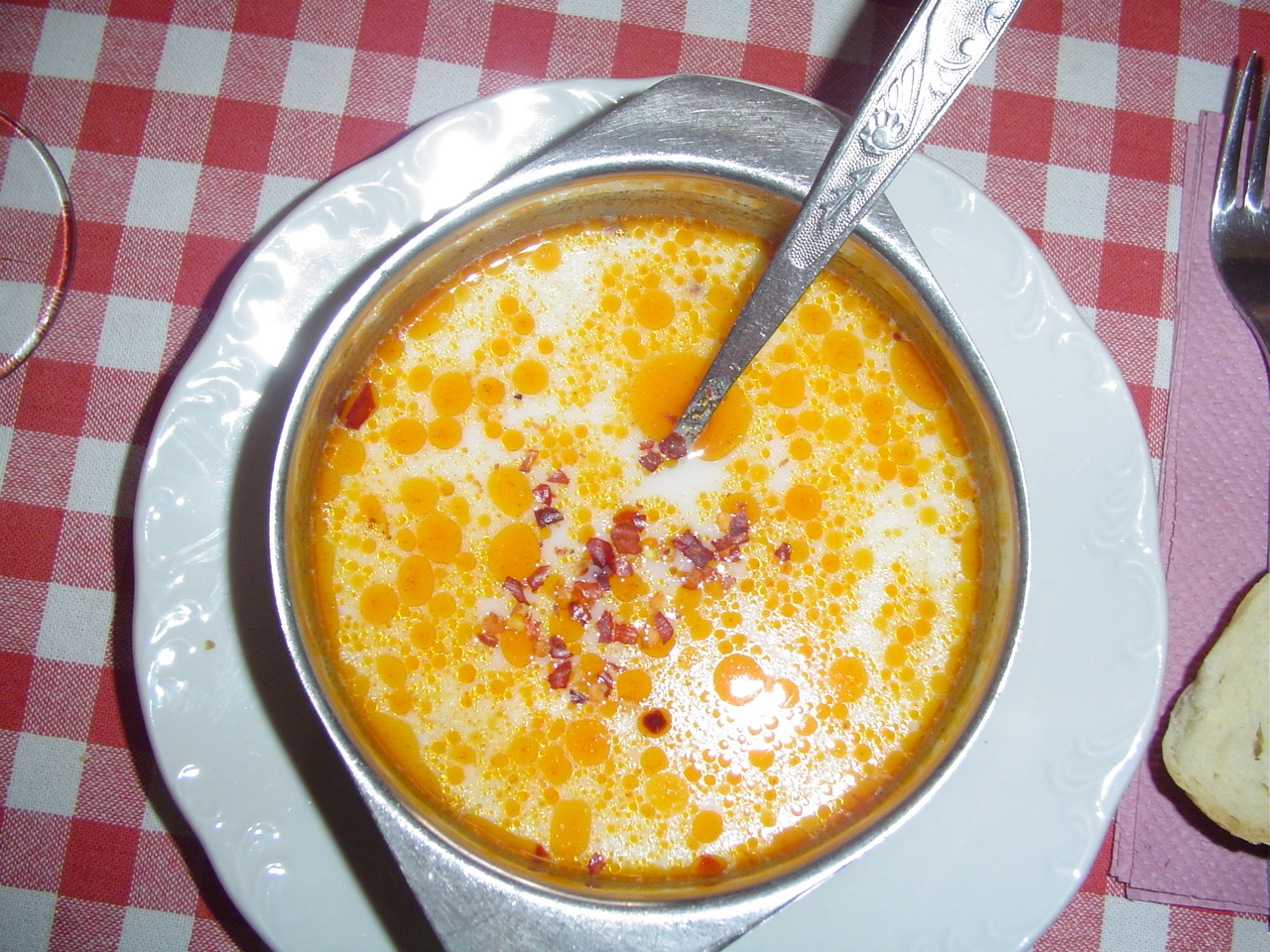
Shkembe chorba

In Romania, there is a dish similar to haggis called drob, which is served at Easter. Romanian families make a kind of traditional sausage from pork offal, called caltaboş, the main difference being that drob is enclosed in abdominal membranes (prapore) of the animal, while chitterlings is used for caltaboş. A popular dish of tripe soup called ciorbă de burtă is similar to shkembe chorba. Also in Bulgaria, North Macedonia and Turkey, shkembe chorba is a widespread soup variety.

There is also a twofold variation on the concept of head cheese: piftie which does contain gelatin, is served cold and is usually only made from pork or beef (traditionally only pork), but does not contain as much head material (usually only the lower legs and ears are used since they contain large amounts of gelatin) and pacele which is exclusively made of meat and tissue found on the head (save for the eyes and usually only made from lamb; addition of brain and tongue varies by local habit). Pacele is made by first boiling the head whole (to soften the meat and make it easier to peel off) and then peeling/scraping off all meat and tissue from it. A generous amount of garlic or garlic juice, the mujdei, is then added and the dish is served warm.

Finally, there are many dishes in Romania that are based on whole offal, such as grilled pig and cow kidney (served with boiled or steam cooked vegetables—usually peas and carrot slices); butcher's brain called creier pane (usually lamb's brains, rolled in batter and deep-fried); tongue and olives stew (mostly done with cow tongue) and many others.

The Armenian traditional dish known as khash is a traditional meal with inexpensive ingredients, originating in the Shirak region. The main ingredient in khash is pig's or cow's feet, although other animal parts, such as the ears and tripe, may also be used. Formerly a nutritious winter food for the poor, it is now considered a delicacy, and is enjoyed as a festive winter meal.

In Hungary, a variety of traditional dishes are based on offal. Pacal or pacalpörkölt (tripe stew), a popular spicy stew, considered a national dish, is made from beef tripe. Ground or chopped pork offal is usually made into a hearty sausage known as "disznósajt" (lit. "pig cheese") somewhat resembling haggis. Puddings and sausages made with blood (véres hurka) and liver (májas hurka) are also quite common, especially as part of the "disznótoros", a dish of different sausages produced from pork. Heart, liver and gizzards of chicken are a traditional part of chicken soup. Gizzards can also be made into a stew ("zúzapörkölt"). While decreasing in popularity, stews made from poultry testicles (kakashere pörkölt) are still considered a delicacy and a dish of high prestige in the countryside. Another dish which became less common is "vese-velő" (pig kidneys with brain). Szalontüdő is made out of the heart and lungs of pork.

Offal is not an uncommon ingredient in Polish cuisine. Kaszanka, a traditional sausage similar to black pudding, is made with a mixture of pig's blood, pig offal and buckwheat or barley usually served fried with onions or grilled. Beef tripe is used to cook a popular soup simply called flaki (pl. guts). Chicken gizzards or hearts can be a base for various stews or soups, such as krupnik, a pearl barley soup (not to be confused with a vodka brand of the same name). Other offal-based soups, less popular today, are Polish blood soup (czernina) and tail soup (zupa ogonowa), based on a cooked beef tail. Pork or beef liver is often consumed sautéed or grilled with onions; liver is also used as one of the ingredients for stuffing baked whole duck or other poultry, or a piglet. Pâtés containing liver are popular. Pork, beef or veal kidneys, known in Polish as cynadry, are typically braised and eaten as a main dish. Pork tongues can be served hot, in a sauce, or cold, set into aspic. Cold pork trotters in aspic are very popular, especially as a companion to vodka. In the past, braised pork or veal brain was a popular snack, but today it is rare.

In Russia, beef liver and tongue are considered valuable delicacies, which may be cooked and served on their own. Kidneys and brains are sometimes used in cooking. The heart is often eaten on its own or used as an additive to the ground meat, as do lungs which give a lighter, airier texture to it. Pig's or sheep's stomach is sometimes used for nyanya, a dish similar to haggis. Head and collagen-rich extremities are used to make kholodets—a version of aspic, whereby these body parts are slowly boiled for several hours with meat and spices, removed and discarded, and the remaining broth is cooled until it congeals.

== South America ==
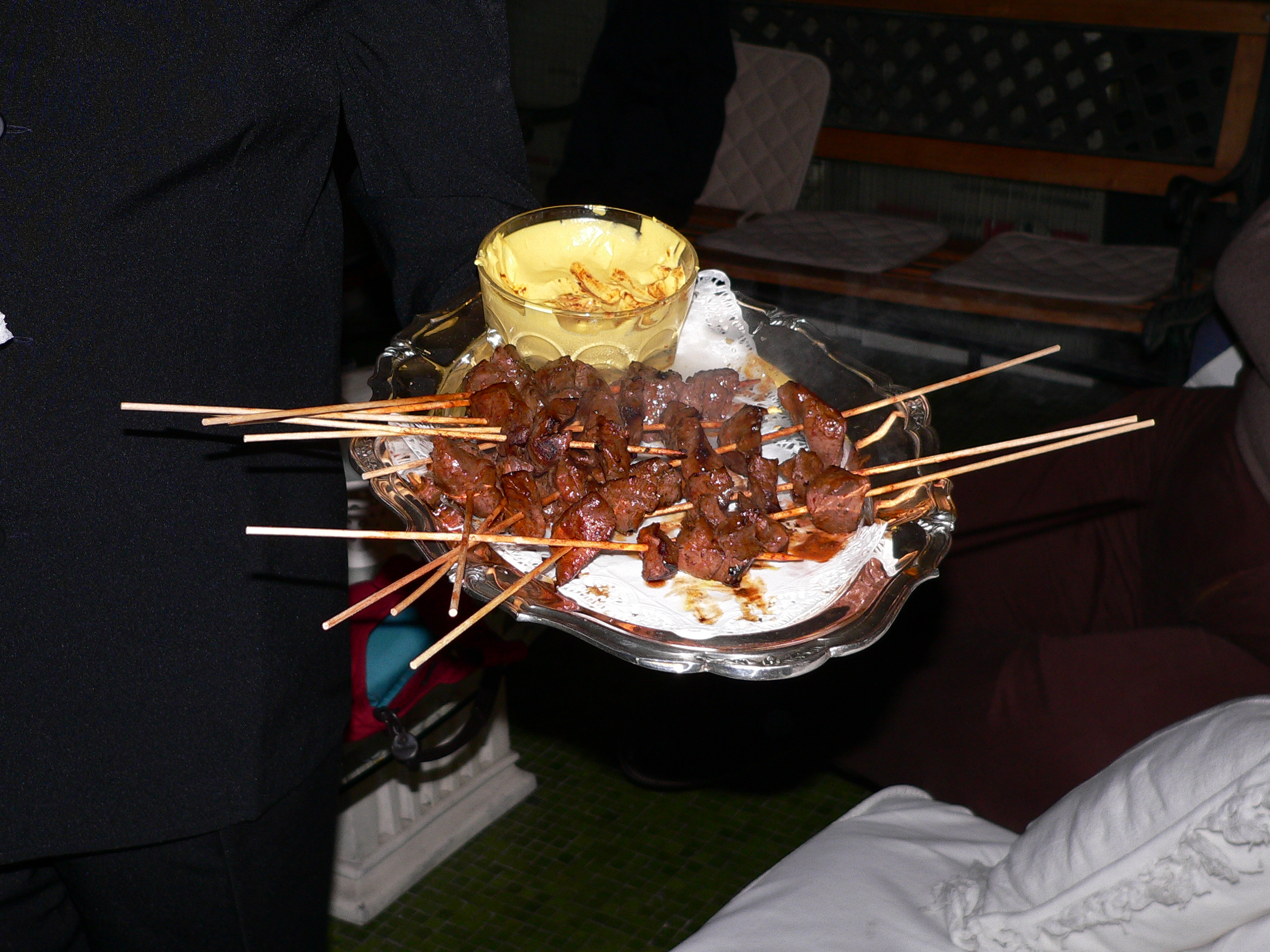
Peruvian anticuchos

In Brazil, churrasco (barbecue) often includes chicken hearts, roasted on a big skewer. The typical feijoada sometimes contains pork trimmings (ears, feet and tail). Gizzard stews, fried beef liver and beef stomach stews used to be more popular dishes in the past, but are nonetheless still consumed. Buchada, a popular dish from the northeast of the country, consists of the diced organs of a goat, which are seasoned and then sewn inside the goat's stomach ("bucho") and boiled. Dobradinha is a dish made with tripe, a variation of the northern Portuguese dish. In the Northeast of Brazil the sarapatel is a very common dish, usually prepared with pork organs (heart, liver, intestine, and kidneys) boiled along with coagulated pork blood in a spiced stew.

In Argentina and Uruguay, the traditional asado is often made along with several offal types (called "achuras"), like chinchulines and tripa gorda (chitterlings), mollejas (sweetbreads) and riñón (cow's kidney). Sesos (brains) are used to make ravioli stuffing. The tongue is usually boiled, sliced and marinated with a mixture of oil, vinegar, salt, chopped peppers and garlic.

In Colombia, menudencias is the name given to the chicken leftovers or offal such as the head, neck, gizzard, and feet. A popular cheap dish containing all this and more is called sopa de menudencias. Head cheese is also common. Just like in Argentina, and depending on the region, Colombian asado and picada involve many offal types, including chunchullo (chitterlings), chicken hearts, and bofe (beef lung). Pelanga is a dish from the departments of Cundinamarca and Boyaca that contains beef or pork snout (jeta), trachea, tongue, and ears. Pepitoria is a dish in the department of Santander that involves offal from billy goats (kidney, liver, heart).

In Peru and Bolivia, beef heart is used for anticuchos—a sort of brochette. In Chile, the tongue is boiled, sliced and served in a walnut-based sauce in New year and Christmas festivities ("lengua nogada") while the soup is used later to cook a wheat, milk and spice ball mix called "albóndigas de sémola". There is also a blood drink called "Ñachi", made from spiced, fresh blood from a recently slaughtered animal. Criadillas or huevos de toro ("bull's eggs", testicles) are eaten mostly in cattle-raising regions, while cow udder ("ubres") is served fried or boiled.

Sopa de mondongo is a soup made from diced tripe (the stomach of a cow or pig) slow-cooked with vegetables such as bell peppers, onions, carrots, cabbage, celery, tomatoes, cilantro (coriander), garlic or root vegetables. Variations can also be found in Nicaragua, Brazil, Colombia, Dominican Republic, Honduras, El Salvador, Panama, Puerto Rico, Venezuela.

== Sub-Saharan Africa ==
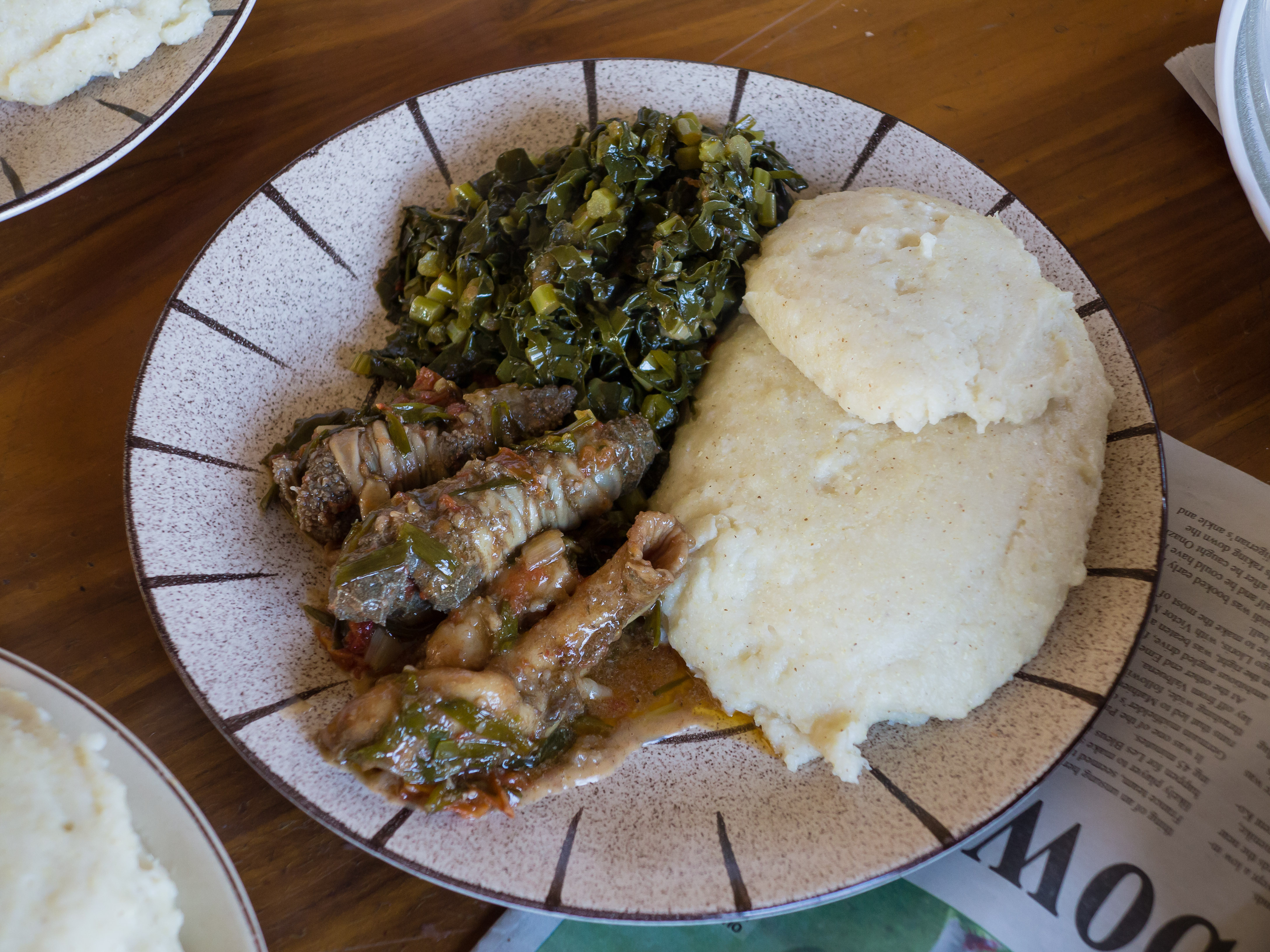
Typical Zimbabwean meal, with sadza, greens, and goat offal 'Zvinyenze' in Shona. The goat intestines are wrapped around the stomach before cooking.

Sausage is made from the small intestine of a goat, cow or sheep, stuffed with chilli and small chunks of meat, fatty meat, and blood (although some people prefer the bloodless kind). In Kenya, it is commonly referred to as 'mutura', which is the Kikuyu name for it. Sheep's or goat's stomach is also stuffed in a similar way.

In the Kikuyu traditions, grilled goat/sheep kidneys are a delicacy usually reserved for young ladies, although today, anybody can consume it. Similarly, the tongue was reserved for men and the ears were to be eaten by little girls. The testicles were for the young men. The livers are also consumed. The heads, lungs, and hooves of animals are boiled to make soup and sometimes mixed with herbs for medicinal purposes.

In South Africa offal, locally known as tripe, is enjoyed by South Africans of diverse backgrounds. Due to the popularity of this dish, it is one of the few customs that white (especially Afrikaners) and black South Africans share.

Offal dishes in South Africa do not usually consist of any organs and are mostly limited to stomach skin, sheep's head, shin, and very rarely brains. Sheep's head has gained many nicknames over the years such as 'skopo' (township colloquial term meaning head) and 'smiley' (referring to the expression of the head when cooked).

There are numerous recipes to cook the above-mentioned items available on many South African websites. One of the more popular way to cook offal in South Africa is to cook it with small potatoes in a curry sauce served on rice. Alternatively, it can be served with samp or maize rice.

In Zimbabwe, as in most of sub-Saharan Africa, little of a slaughtered animal goes to waste. Offal is a common relish enjoyed by people of all cultures. Beef and goat offal dishes include the stomach, hooves (trotters), shin, intestines, liver, head, tongue, pancreas, lungs, kidneys, udders, and, very rarely in certain communities, testicles. Beef or goat blood, sometimes mixed with other offal pieces, is often cooked to make a dish known in Ndebele as "ububende" and Shona as "musiya". Chicken dishes include feet, liver, intestines, and gizzards. A popular preparation of goat or sheep offal involves wrapping pieces of the stomach with the intestines before cooking.

In Nigeria offal is consumed by all the people in Nigeria, in delicacies such as Abula, Edika ikong and white soup. It is called 'Inu eran' in Yoruba literally meaning the insides of an animal. They have names for some parts which include roundabout, shaki (tripes), Edo (liver).

== East Asia ==
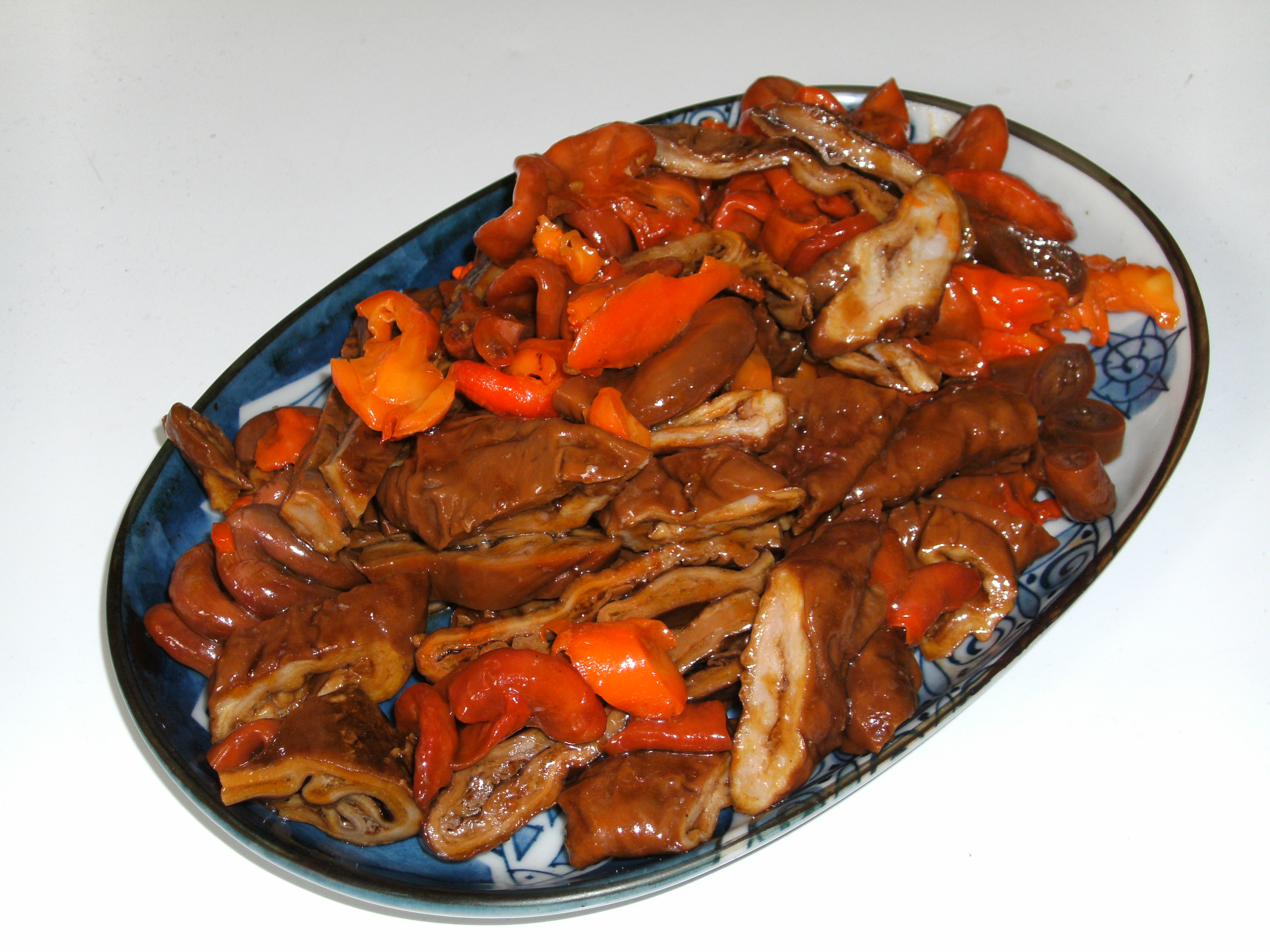
Chinese lou mei, made with pork offal

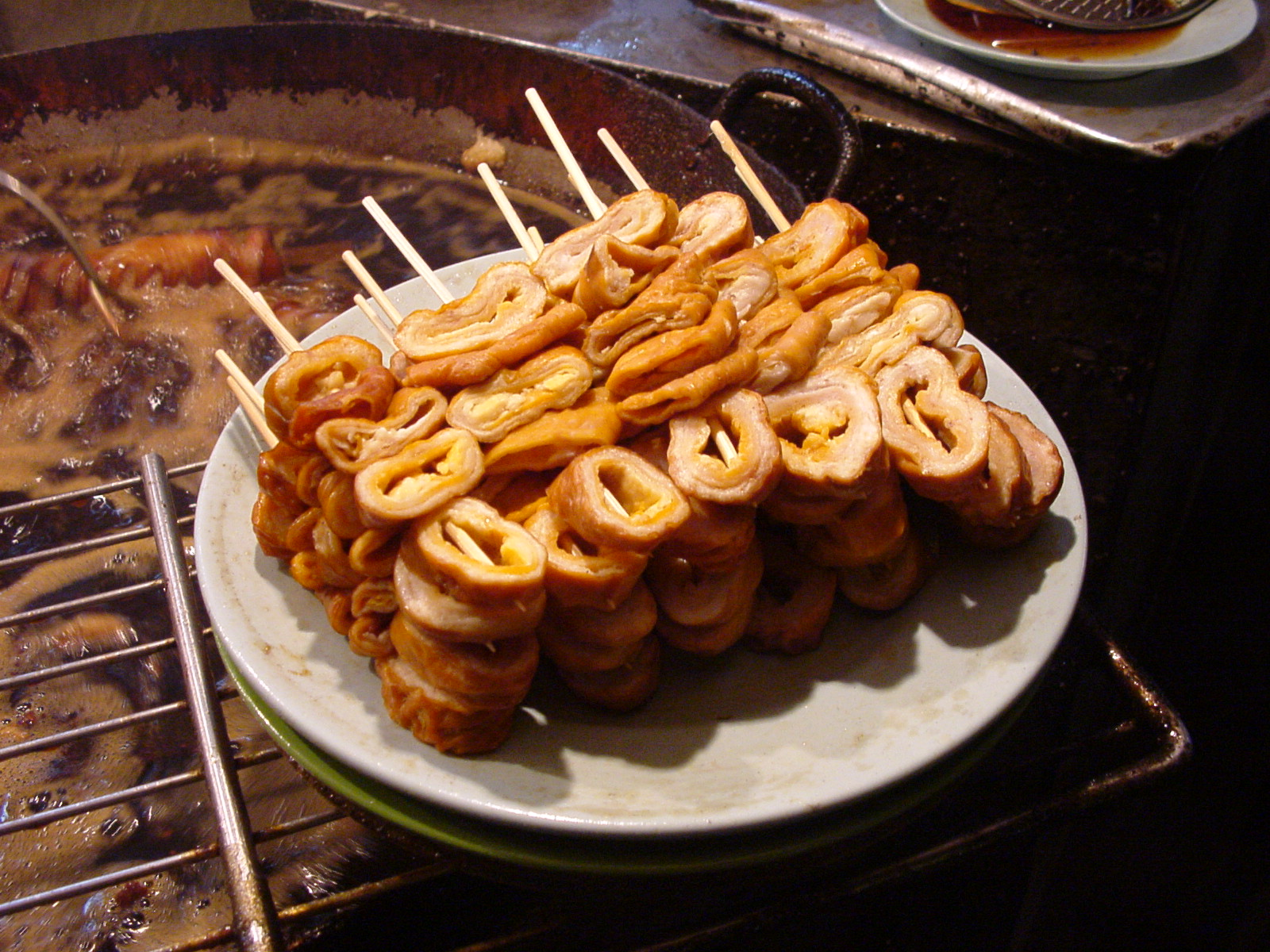
Deep fried pork intestines from China

=== China ===
In China, many organs and animal-parts are used for food or traditional Chinese medicine. Since pork is the most consumed non-seafood meat in China, popular pork offal dishes include stir-fried pork kidneys with oyster sauce, ginger and scallions, "五更肠旺—Wu Geng Chang Wang", a spicy stew with preserved mustard, tofu, pork intestine slices and congealed pork blood cubes. "炸肥肠—Zha Fei Chang", deep fried pork intestine slices and dipped in a sweet bean sauce, is commonly offered by street hawkers. Pork tongue slices with salt and sesame oil is also a popular dish, especially in Sichuan province. Braised pork ear strips in soy sauce, five-spice powder and sugar is a common "cold plate" appetizer available as hawker food or in major local supermarkets. Stir-fried pork kidneys or liver slices with oyster sauce, ginger and scallions or in soups is a regular dish in southern provinces. Pork blood soup is at least 1,000 years old since the Northern Song dynasty, when the quintessential Chinese restaurant and eateries became popular. Pork blood soup and dumplings, jiaozi, were recorded as food for night labourers in Kaifeng. In Shanghai cuisine, the soup has evolved into the well-known "酸辣湯—Suan La Tang", Hot and Sour Soup, with various additional ingredients. As well as pork, the offal of other animals is used in traditional Chinese cooking, most commonly cattle, duck, and chicken.

Offal dishes are particularly popular in the southern region of Guangdong and in Hong Kong. For example, Cantonese "燒味—Siu mei", (Barbecued/Roasted Delicacies) shops, have achieved their foundation of influence here. Besides the popular cha siu barbecued pork, "siu yuk" crispy skin pork, along with assorted types of poultry, there are also the roasted chicken liver with honey, and the very traditional, and very expensive now, "金錢雞—Gum Chin Gai", another honey-roasted dim sum that is a sandwich of a piece each of pork fat, pork/chicken liver, ginger and cha siu.

The use of offal in dim sum does not stop there. In dim sum restaurants, the feet of chicken, ducks and pork are offered in various cooking styles. For example, "豬腳薑—Jui Kerk Gieng" (pork feet in sweet vinegar stew) is a popular bowl now besides its traditional function as a supplement for postpartum mother care. Young ginger stems, boiled eggs, and blanched pork feet are stew in sweet black rice vinegar for a few hours to make this. "鴨腳紮—Ap Kerk Jat" (literally Duck leg Wrap) is a piece each of ham, shiitake mushroom and deep-fried fish maw wrapped with duck feet in a dried bean curd sheet in and steamed. The use of fish offal in Cantonese cuisine is not limited to the maw. For example, there is the folksy dish of "東江魚雲煲—Tung Gong Yu Wan Bo", a casserole with the lips of freshwater large head fish; and shark fin soup.

In the more pragmatic folksy eateries, however, maximum utilization of the food resource is the traditional wisdom. The fish is used in its entirety and nothing is wasted. Deep-fried fish skin is a popular side dish at fish ball noodle shops. The intestines are steamed with egg and other ingredients in Hakka cuisine. Finally, the bones are wrapped in a cotton bag to boil in the soup for noodles.

Teochew cuisine shows its best manifestation also in Hong Kong. The goose meat, liver, blood, intestine, feet, neck and tongue are all major ingredients to various dishes. There is also the must-try soup, pork stomach with whole peppercorns and pickled mustard.

The use of beef organs is classically represented in noodle shops here. Each respectable operation has its own recipe for preparing the stews of brisket, intestine, lung, and varieties of tripe. The big pots are often placed facing the street and next to the entrance such that the mouth-watering aroma is the best draw for the shop's business.

Contrary to a common Westerners' disgust for these dishes due to cultural unfamiliarity and sanitary concerns, these offal items are very well cleaned. The pork intestines' tough inner skin (which is exposed to bolus and pre-fecal materials) is completely removed. Then, the intestine is exhaustively soaked, cleaned and rinsed. The nephrons of pork kidneys are skillfully excised, and the kidneys are soaked for several hours and cleaned.

The use of the pancreas, liver, kidney, gall bladder, lung and even bronchus of various farm animals together with herbs in Chinese medicine have strong empirical theories and studies are being conducted to try to understand their nature in modern scientific terms. However, there are other strange offal usages in folk practice. Taoist and rural folk beliefs have their influence. The idea of essences and energy, heat and cold, is key. Snake wine with a live snake gallbladder is thought to promote stamina due to the "essences of energy and heat", which is derived from a snake's attributes, such as aggressive behavior (fiery) and venom (energy). When bears were more common in the Chinese northeast, bears claw and dried bear offal were used as medicines, seen as a source of vitality. Dry deer antlers are still a common medicine, thought to provide "yang energy" to complement the male sex and the tail, "yin energy" for the female sex. Extractions of animal penises and testes are still believed to contribute to better male performance and those of the embryo and uterus to the eternal youth of the female. However, these are being marginalized as synthetic hormones get more popular and affordable.

=== Japan ===
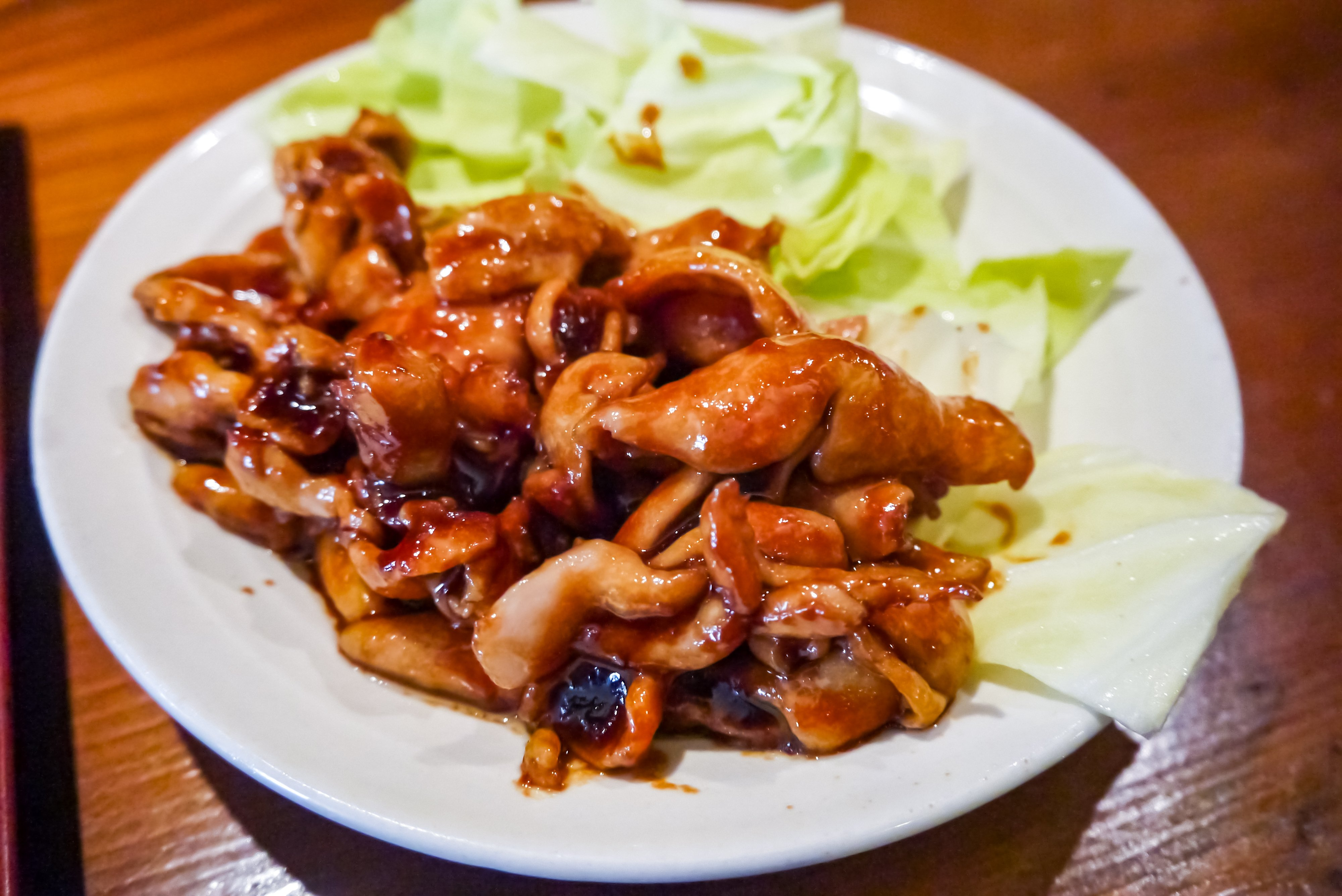
Japanese horumonyaki

Japan has a long history of eating offal, and the Man'yoshu, an anthology compiled around the 7th to 8th century, mentions eating deer liver as a household dish and stomach as salted fish. There is a popular belief in Japan that people did not eat offal, and that Japan was a Buddhist country and did not eat meat before the Meiji period. In fact, meat was well eaten in Japan even before the Meiji period, and there are many records in written sources, and there is a long history of eating offal in Japan. A dish of horse offal cooked in a pot has been a common dish since the Edo period, and the Ryukyu Kingdom, which was located in present-day Okinawa, has been in existence since the 15th century and has a custom of eating pork in its entirety, including the offal. Although there was an official ban on eating meat in Japan during the Edo period, the culture of eating meat actually continued, and many meat dishes from various animals are recorded in literature. In addition, there are still meat specialty restaurants in Japan that have been in business for 300 years.

Some types of offal, like the liver and chicken gizzards (砂肝, sunagimo) served as yakitori, are considered desirable and are referred to be by name. Less desirable parts, including but not limited to the intestines, are collectively referred to as motsu (もつ) or horumon (ホルモン). The origin of the term horumon is disputed: while folk etymology claims it comes from Osaka dialect hōrumon (放る物), "things to throw away", it more likely originates from marketing offal as a nutritious and thus hormone-producing food.

Offal can be fried and sold on skewers or kushi (串) in kushikatsu (串カツ) or kushiage (串揚げ) restaurants and street vendor pushcarts. When grilled, it is usually called horumonyaki. It is also served as a soup called motsuni (もつ煮) with miso, ginger, and finely chopped green onions to cut the smell, as well as other ingredients and internal organs such as the stomach, depending on the preparer. In Okinawa, the soup is called nakamijiru (中身汁) and served without miso as the chitterlings are put through a long cleaning process to get rid of the smell so the miso is not needed. In Nagoya it is called doteyaki (どて焼き) and is served with red miso and without the soup. In Fukuoka, it is called motsunabe (もつ鍋) and is served as a nabe stew along with cabbage, chives, mungbean sprout, and tofu.

=== Korea ===
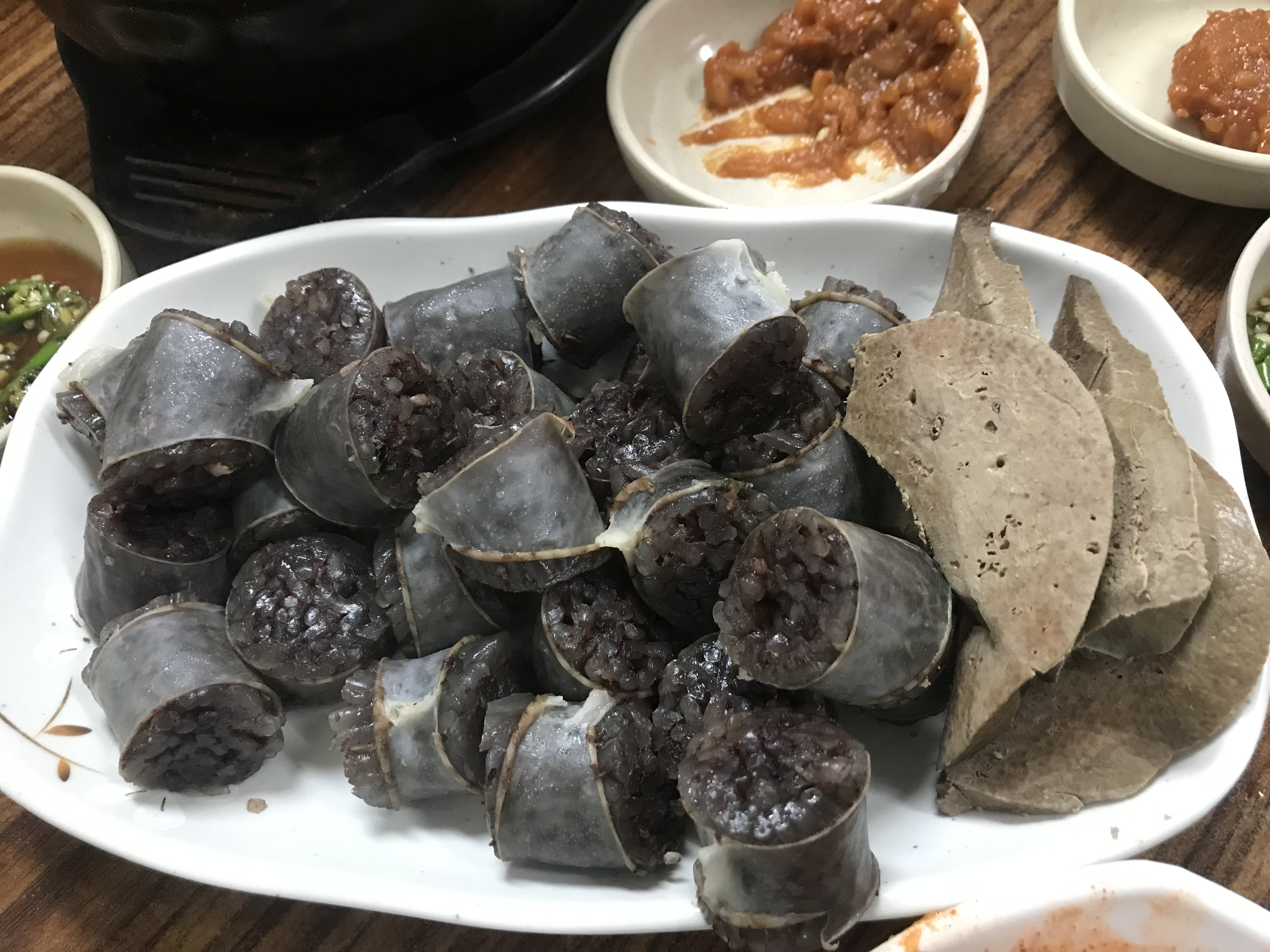
Korean sundae (blood sausage) with liver

In Korea, offal usage is very similar to mainland China but less frequent. Grilled intestine slices and pork blood are both consumed. Headcheese prepared with pork head meat was quite popular in the past. Steamed pork intestines are easy to be found in traditional markets. The popular traditional Korean sausage called sundae is steamed pork small intestines filled with pork blood, seasoned noodles, and vegetables. Pork feet steamed in a special stock are considered a delicacy in Korea. Beef stomach and intestines are still quite popular for cooking. It is not difficult to find grilled chicken hearts, gizzards, and feet in traditional street bars. Medicinal usages are also similar to mainland China and less common with offal uses.

== Southeast Asia ==
=== Indonesia ===
In Indonesia cow and goat internal organs are popular delicacies, it can be fried, made into soto soups or grilled as satay and almost all of the parts of the animal are eaten. Soto Betawi is known as the type of soto that uses various kinds of offal, while soto babat only uses tripes. Within Indonesian cuisine traditions, the Minangkabau cuisine (popularly known as "Padang food") are known for their fondness of offal, mostly are made into gulai (a type of curry) such as gulai otak (brain), gulai babat (tripes), gulai usus (intestine), gulai sumsum (bone marrow), also fried hati (liver) and limpa (spleen). The cartilage, skin and tendon parts of cow legs are also used in dishes called tunjang, kaki sapi or kikil also can be made as gulai or soto. Cow's stomach (babat) and intestine (iso) are popular, fried or in soup, in Javanese cuisine. Cow's lung called paru, coated with spices (turmeric and coriander) and fried is often eaten as a snack or side dish. The liver is also sometimes made into a spicy dish called rendang. Cow or goat tongue is sliced and fried, sometimes in a spicy sauce, or more often beef tongue are cooked as semur stew. Brain is sometimes consumed as soto or gulai. The eye is also consumed as soto, while bone marrow is consumed as soup or soto. Cows and goat testicles popularly called torpedo are also consumed as satay or soto. Due to their rarity, the testicles are among the most expensive offal in Indonesia.

A non-halal offal dish is popular among Chinese Indonesian community. Sekba is a Chinese Indonesian pork offal stewed in mild soy sauce-based soup. The stew tastes mildly sweet and salty, made from soy sauce, garlic, and Chinese herbs. It is a popular fare street food in Indonesian Chinatowns, such as Gloria alley, Glodok Chinatown in Jakarta. The types of pork offal being offered as sekba are pig's ears, tongue, intestines and lungs. Meanwhile, a variation of pork offal soup called "Song Sui" is also popular and is ethnic to Chinese Indonesian communities in Bangka Belitung Islands.

Avian offal are commonly consumed too. Giblets, liver and intestines of chicken, duck and burung ayam-ayaman (watercock) are consumed as delicacies, commonly skewered as satay and being deep-fried. Deep-fried crispy chicken intestine in particular is a popular snack.

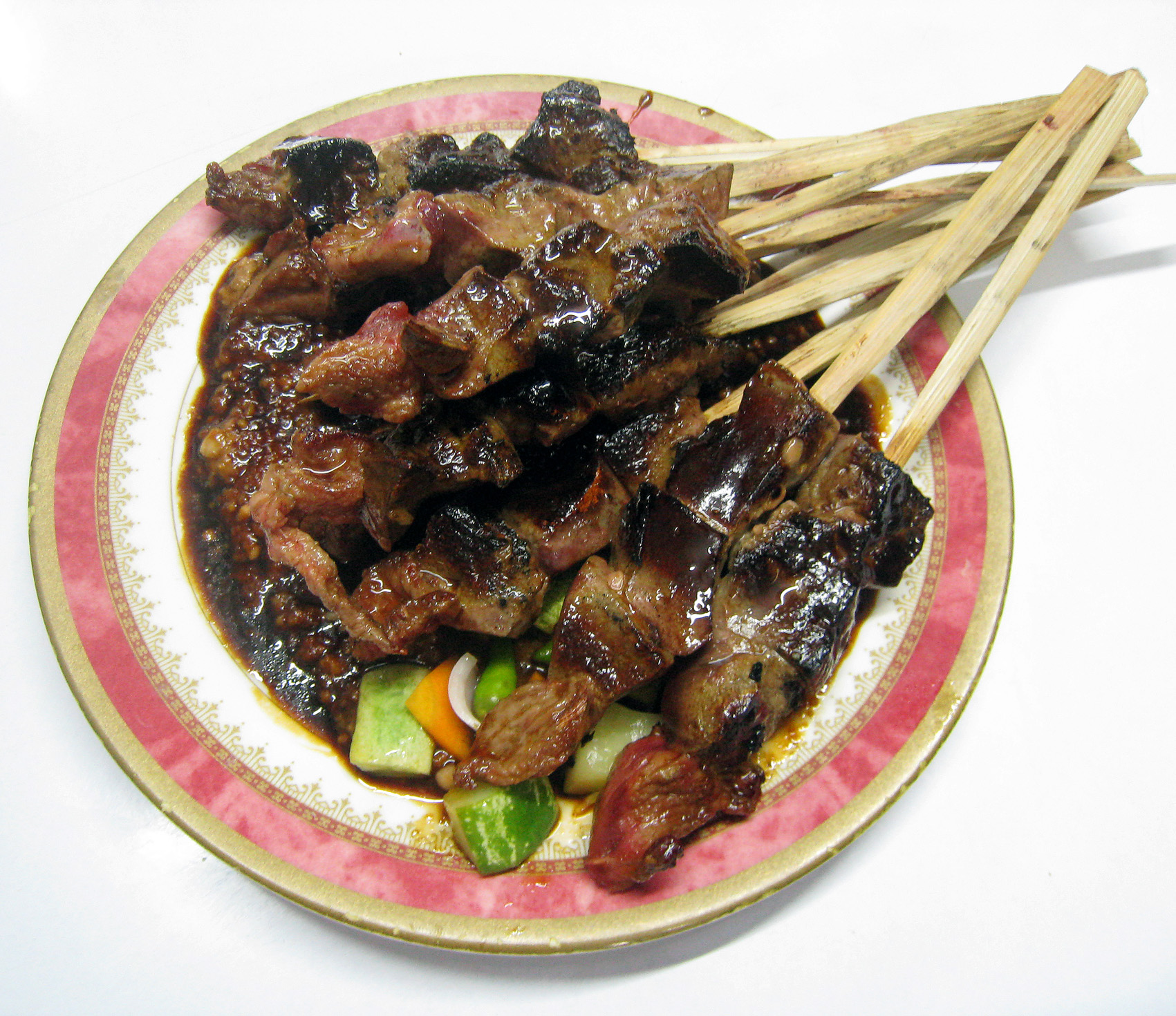
Goat liver satay

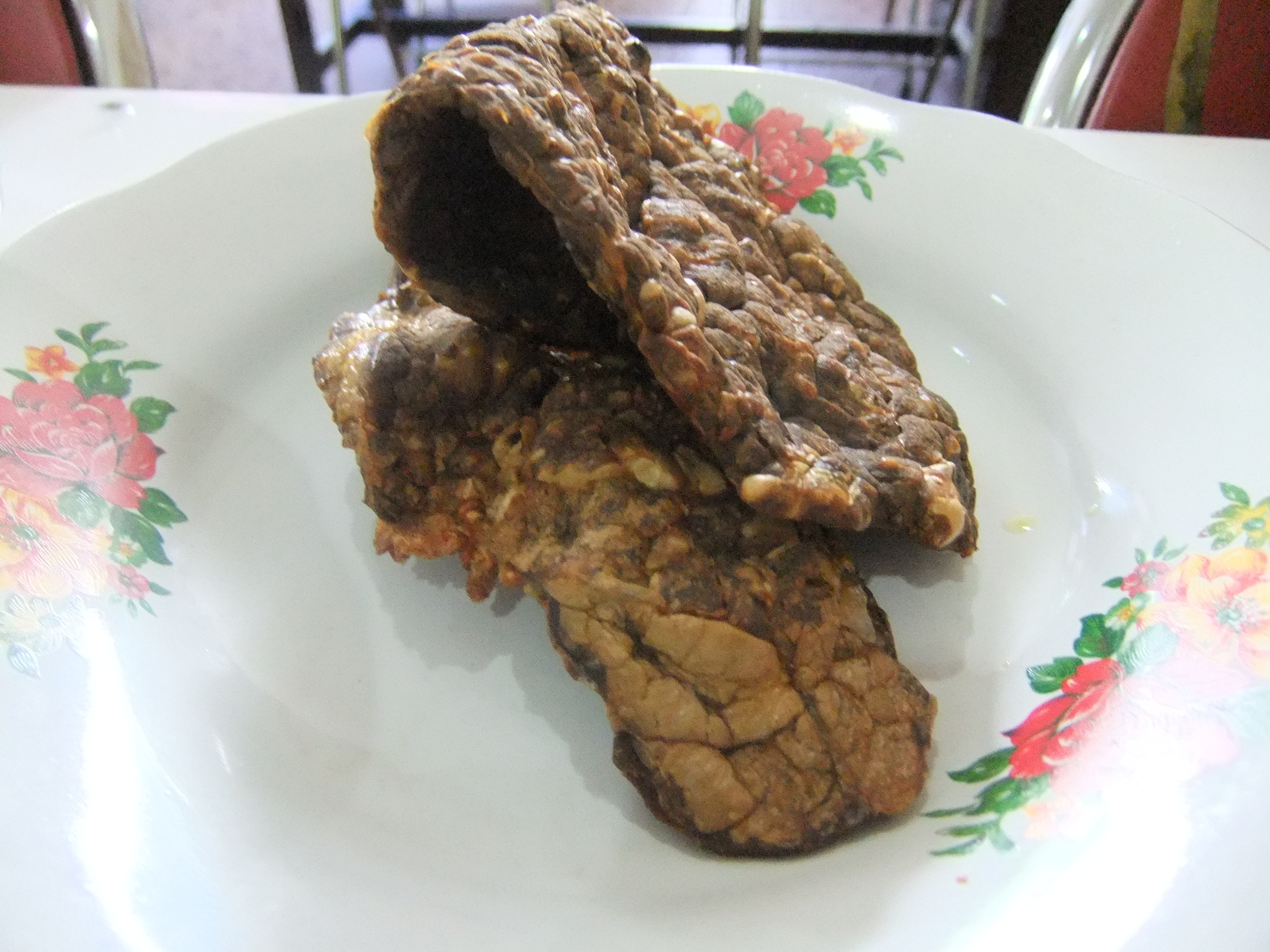
Padang-style fried cow lung from West Sumatra

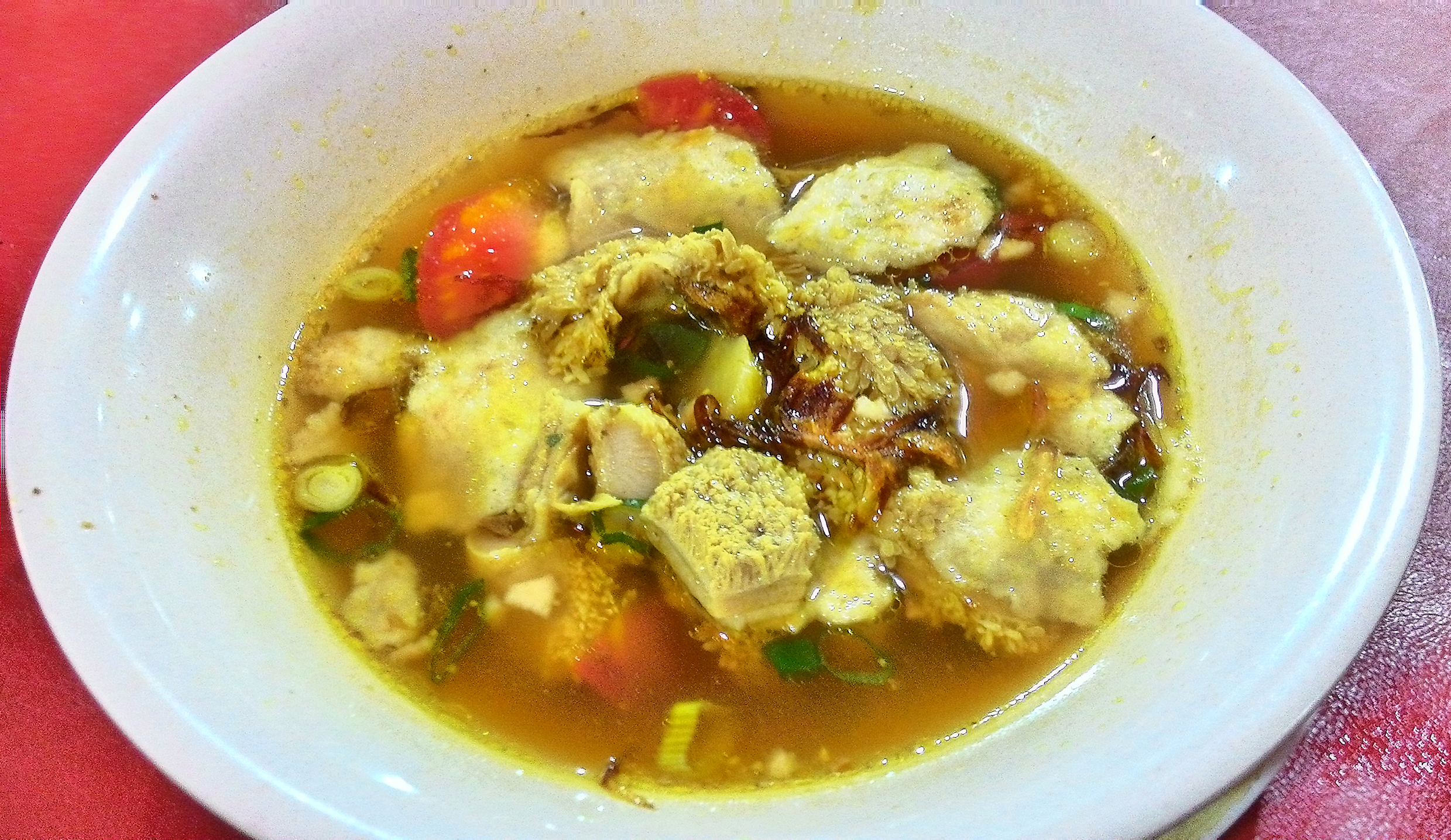
Soto babat, spicy tripe soup

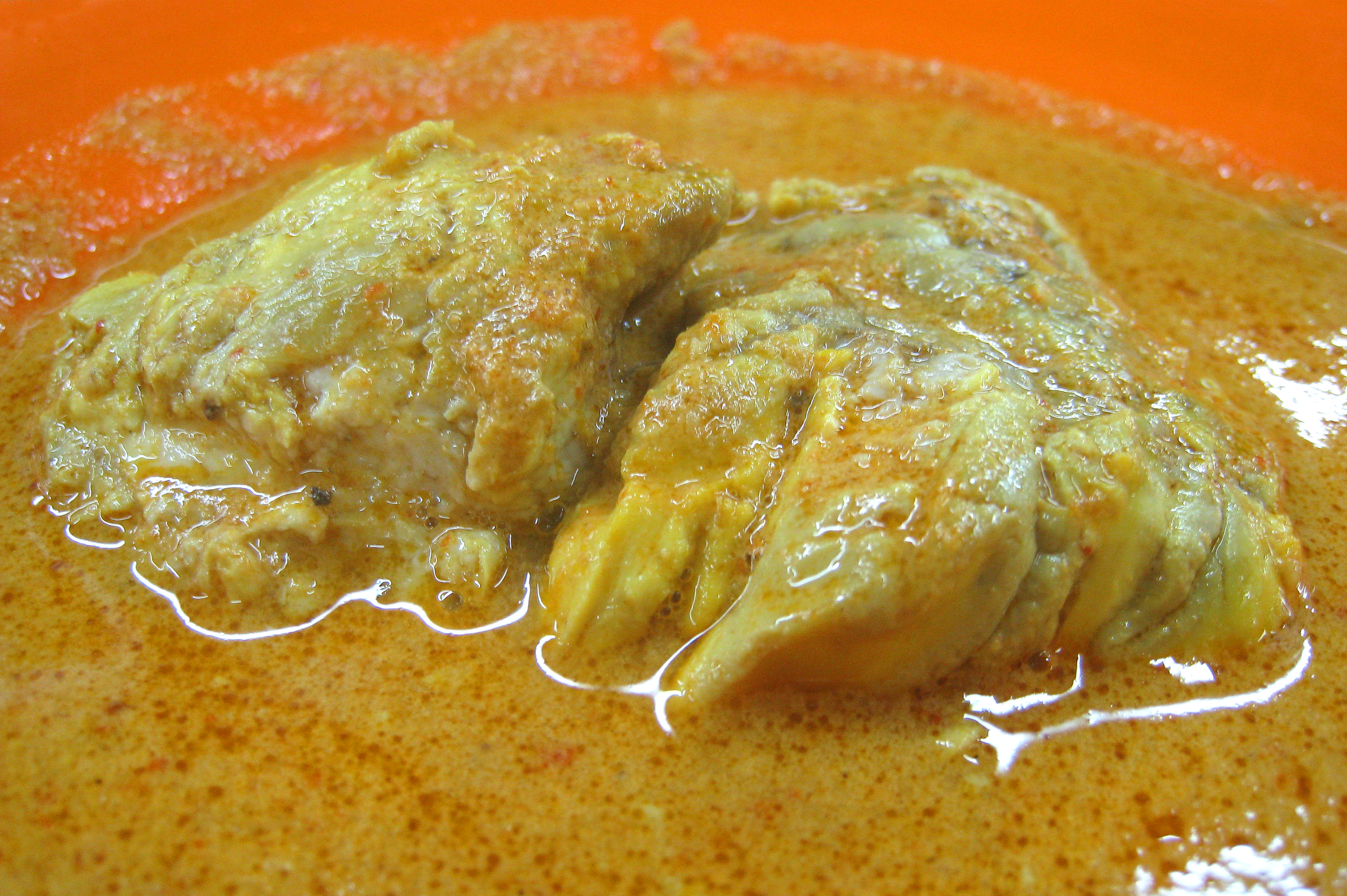
Gulai otak, Indonesian cattle's brain curry

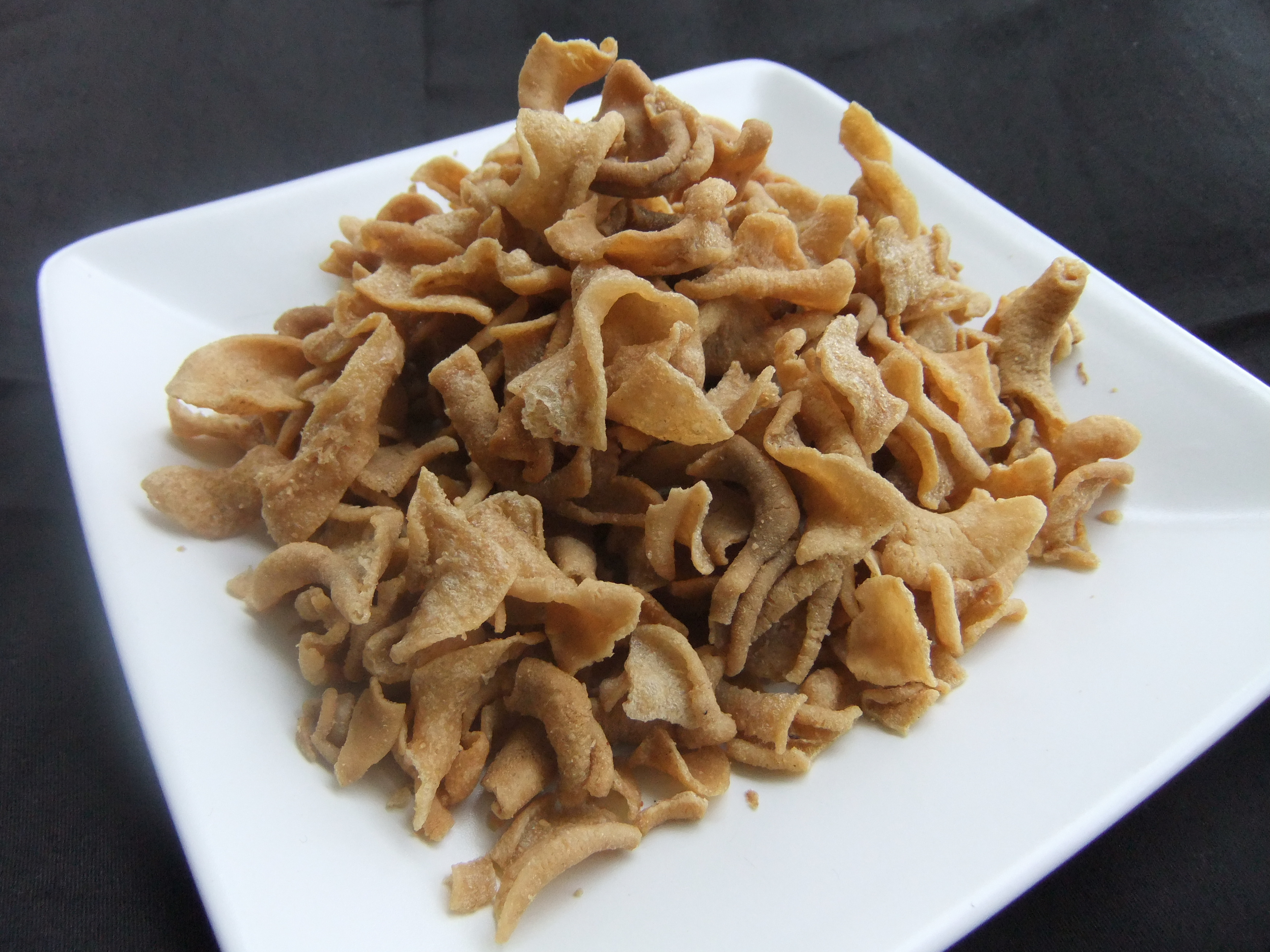
Deep fried crispy chicken intestines as snack

Chitterlings and liver satay

=== Malaysia and Singapore ===
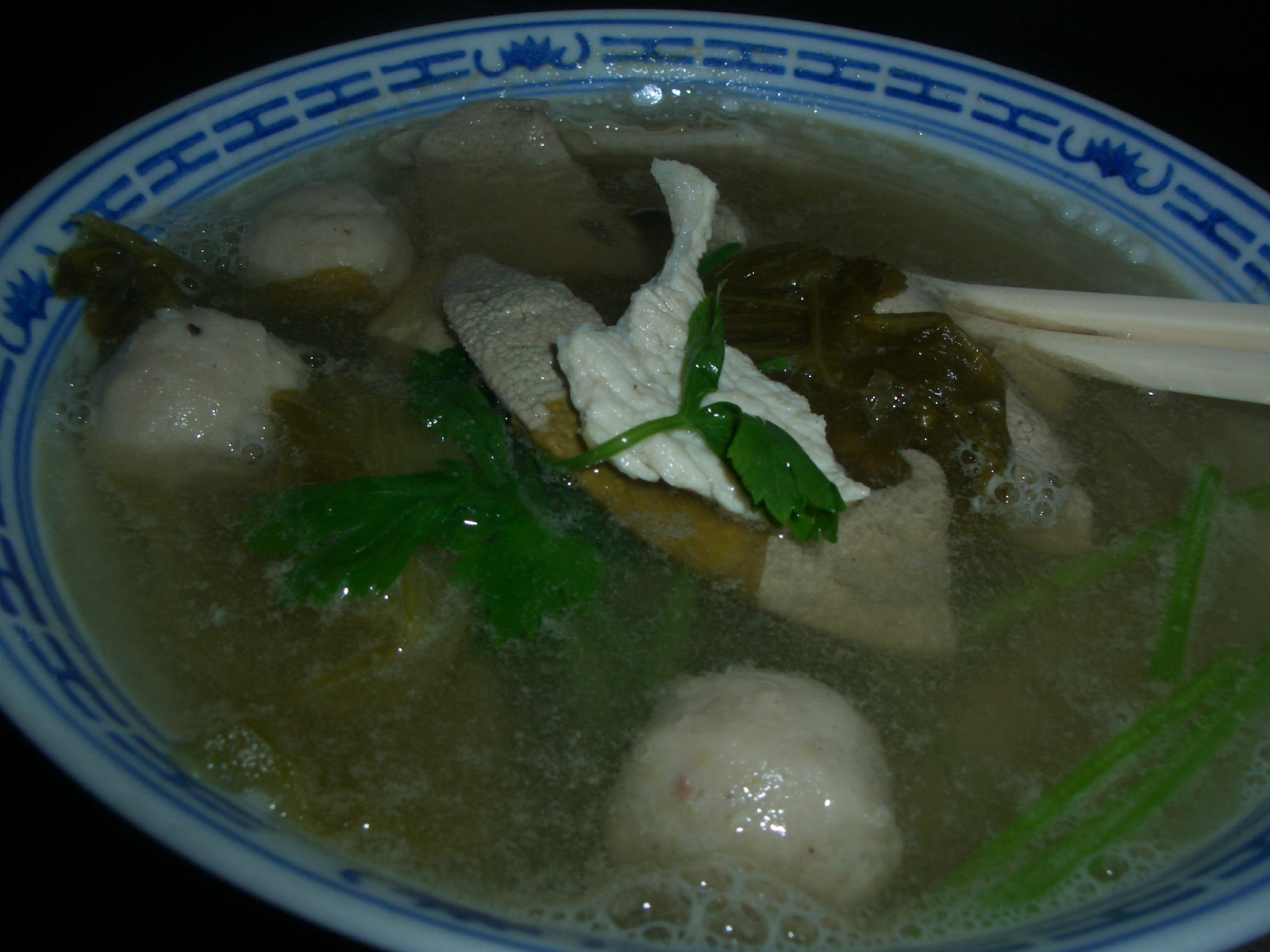
Pig's organ soup from Singapore

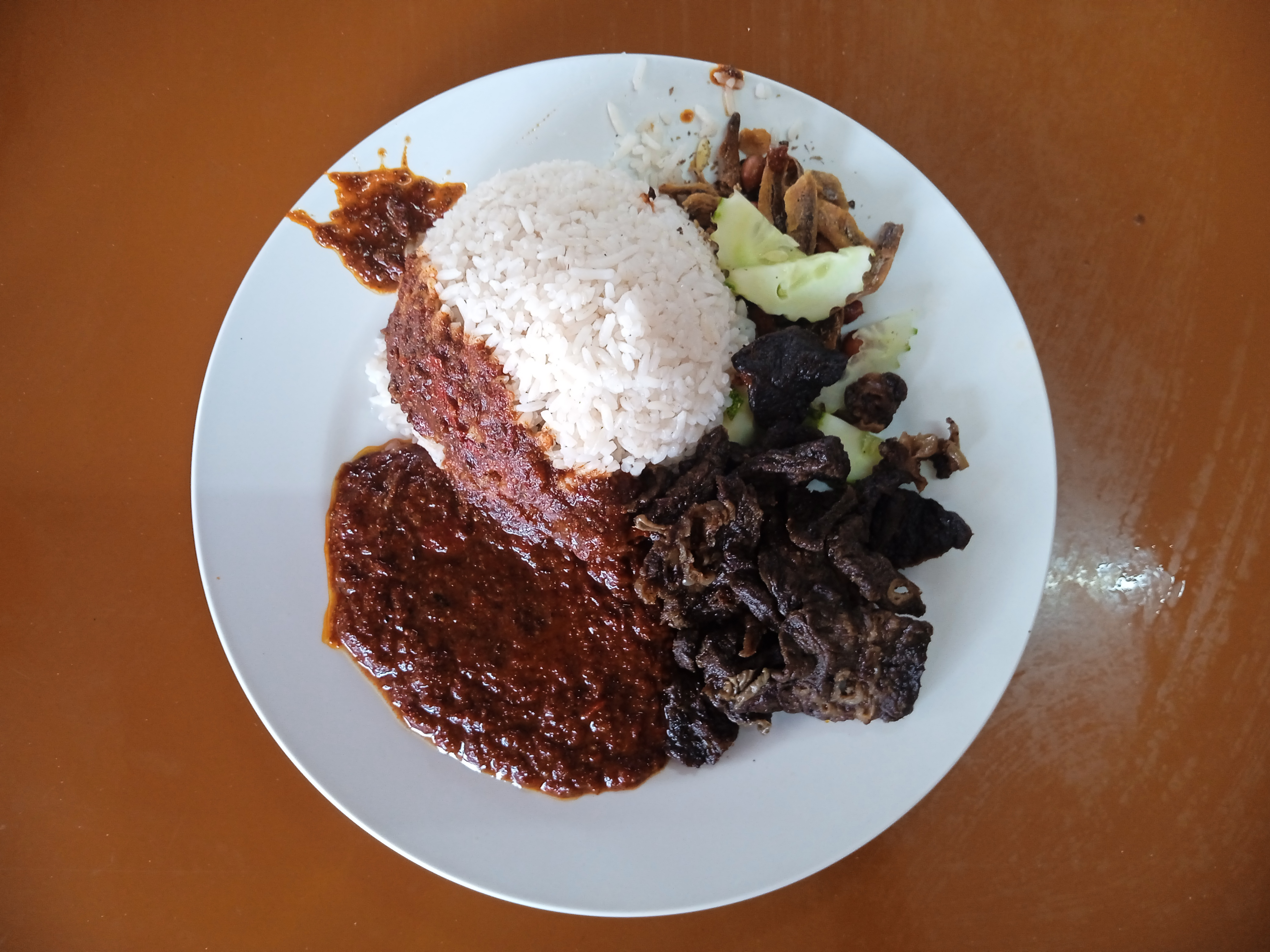
Nasi lemak served with paru goreng (fried cow lung)

In Malaysia, cow or goat lung, called paru, coated in turmeric and fried is often served as a side dish to rice, especially in the ever-popular nasi lemak. Tripe is used in a few dishes either stir-fried or in a gravy. Tripe is also consumed as satay. The liver is deep-fried or stir-fried in some vegetable dishes.

In Malaysia and Singapore, pig's organ soup is a common feature of hawker centres. Due to Singapore's proximity and ethnic makeup, many of the items listed for Indonesia and Malaysia above are also found in Singapore.

=== Philippines ===
In the Philippines, people eat practically every part of the pig, including snout, intestines, ears, and innards. The dish sisig from Pampanga is traditionally made from the skin on a pig's head, and it also includes the ears and brain. The dish dinakdakan from the Ilocos Region also includes the same pig parts, while warek-warek, also from the same region, uses pig innards. Dinuguan is a particular type of blood-stew (depending on region) made using pig intestines, pork meat and sometimes ears and cheeks usually with a vinegar base, and green chilli peppers. Pig's blood is also the main ingredient of pinuneg, a blood sausage made in the Cordilleras. Bopis (bópiz in Spanish) is a spicy Filipino dish made out of pork lungs and heart sautéed in tomatoes, chilies and onions. Pieces of pigs' lungs (baga) along with the tendons (litid) are also skewered and deep-fried and are served as street food in Metro Manila. Another treat is chicharong bulaklak which is made by frying a pig's bowel mesentery until crispy.

Isaw is a street food popular in the Philippines made with pig and chicken intestine pieces which are skewered, barbecued, and dipped in vinegar before eating. Other street food that are prepared in a similar way are pig ears, skin, liver and coagulated blood cut into cubes, and chicken heads, necks, feet, and gizzards. On the other hand, chicken gizzard and liver are also cooked together adobo style and are served as a viand eaten with rice.

Papaitan, or sinanglaw, in the Ilocos Region, is an offal stew whose signature ingredient is its broth made from animal bile. The original stew was made from goat offal or goat tripe, however, offal from cattle or carabao are also used. Papaitan means "bitterness", from the taste of the bile. In the province of Cagayan, a version of the dish without the bile is called menudencia. The dish kare-kare is made with beef tripe and tail stewed in peanut sauce. Beef tripe is also a main ingredient in a rice porridge dish called goto. Although, goto in the province of Batangas refers to a soup dish with the same tripe ingredient, instead of rice porridge. Beef tongue, on the other hand, is stewed in a creamy dish called lengua (Spanish for "tongue"). Beef liver, as well as pig liver, are also main ingredients in meat stews such as menudo, and the Ilocano igado (from "hígado" or Spanish for "liver").

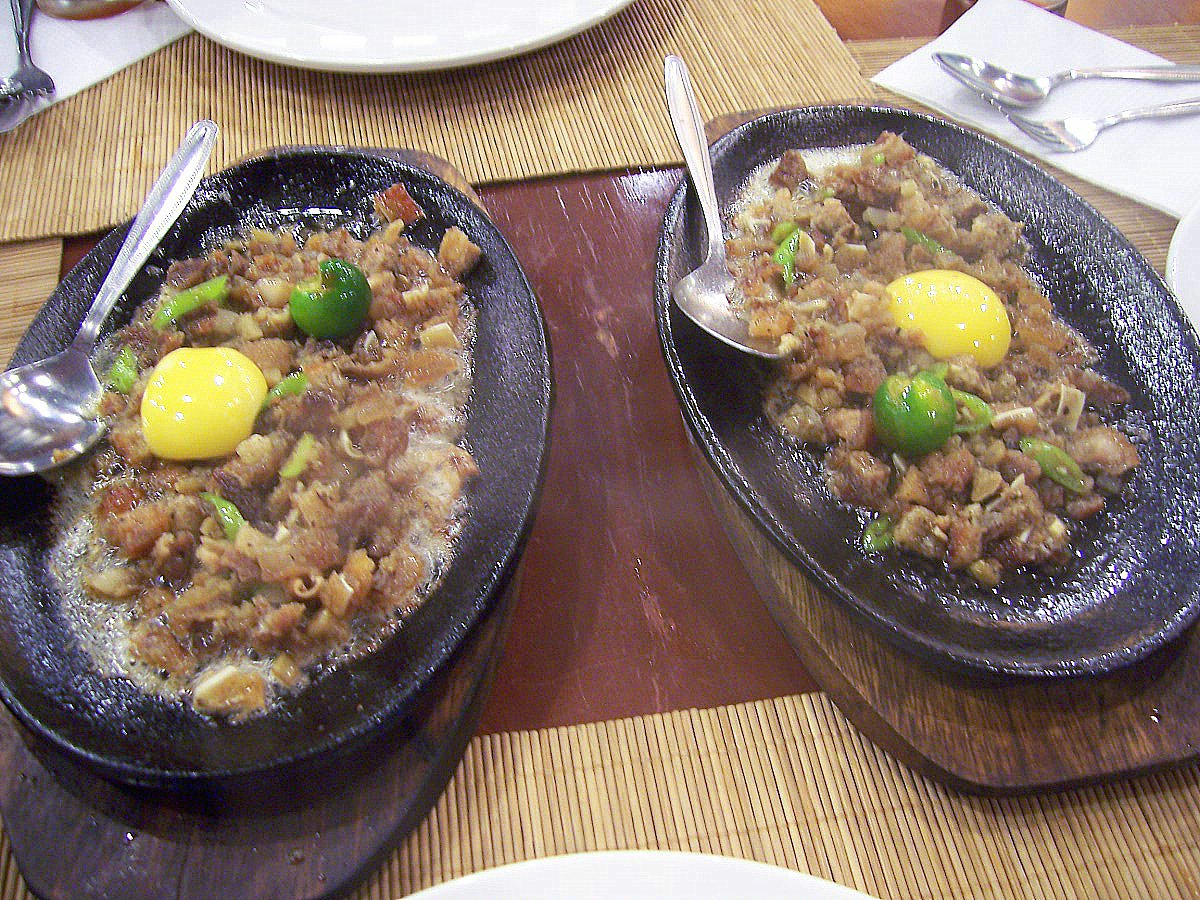
Sisig is made from pig snout, ears and brain.

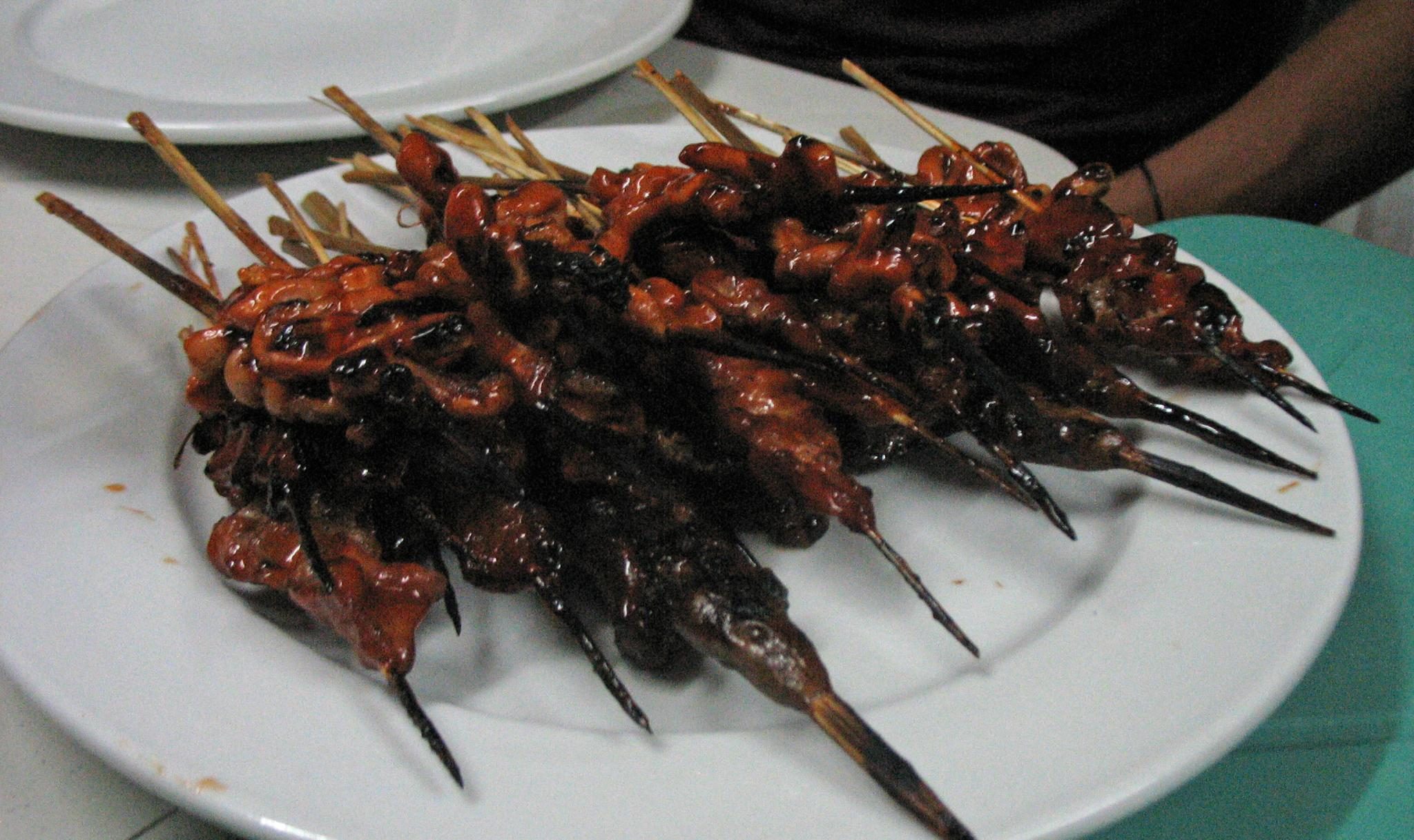
Isaw is a popular street food that is made from skewered chicken or pig intestines.

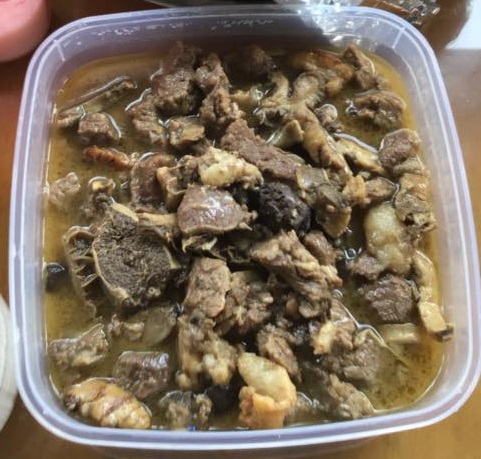
Pinapaitan is made from goat offals flavored with bile.

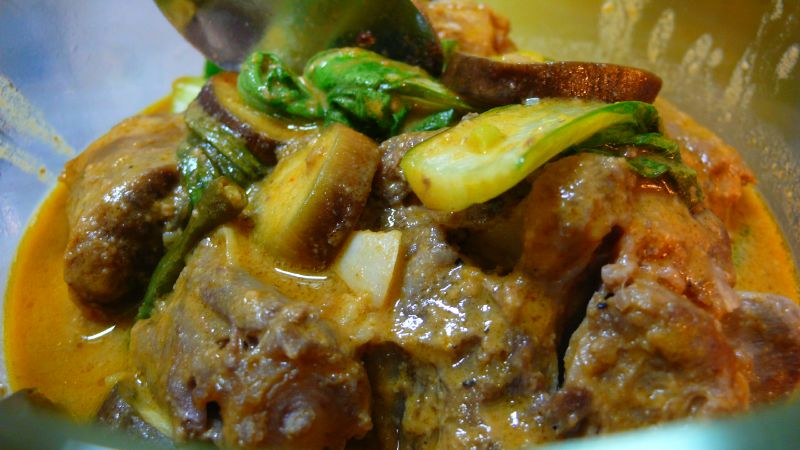
Kare-kare is a stew made from oxtail and tripe.

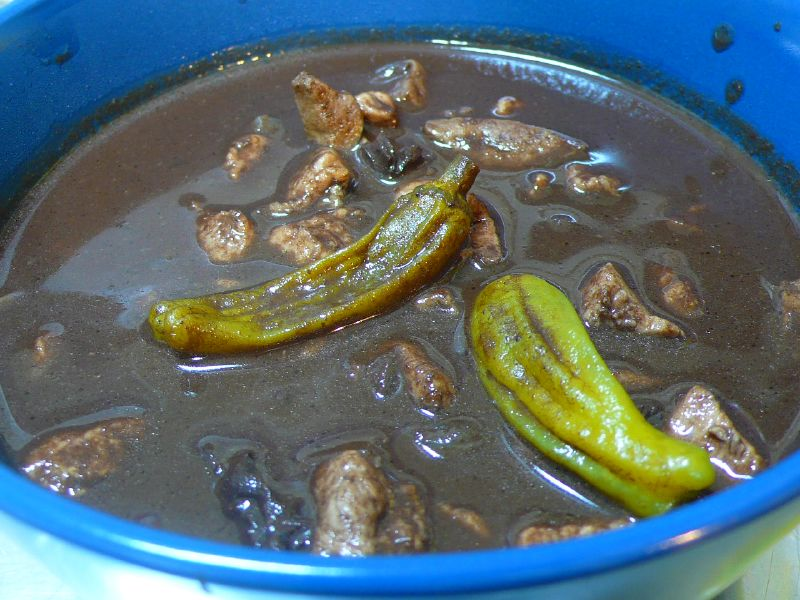
Dinuguan, a stew made from pig's blood, varies per region.

=== Thailand ===
In Thai cuisine, offal is used in many dishes. The well-known lap made with minced pork, which often features on menus in the West, will in Thailand often also contain some liver or intestines. Deep-fried intestines, known as sai mu thot, are eaten with a spicy dipping sauce. Other dishes containing offal are the Thai-Chinese soup called kuaichap (intestines, liver) and the northern Thai aep ong-o (pig brains). Tai pla is a salty sauce of southern Thai cuisine made from the fermented innards of the short-bodied mackerel. It is used in dishes such as kaeng tai pla and nam phrik tai pla.

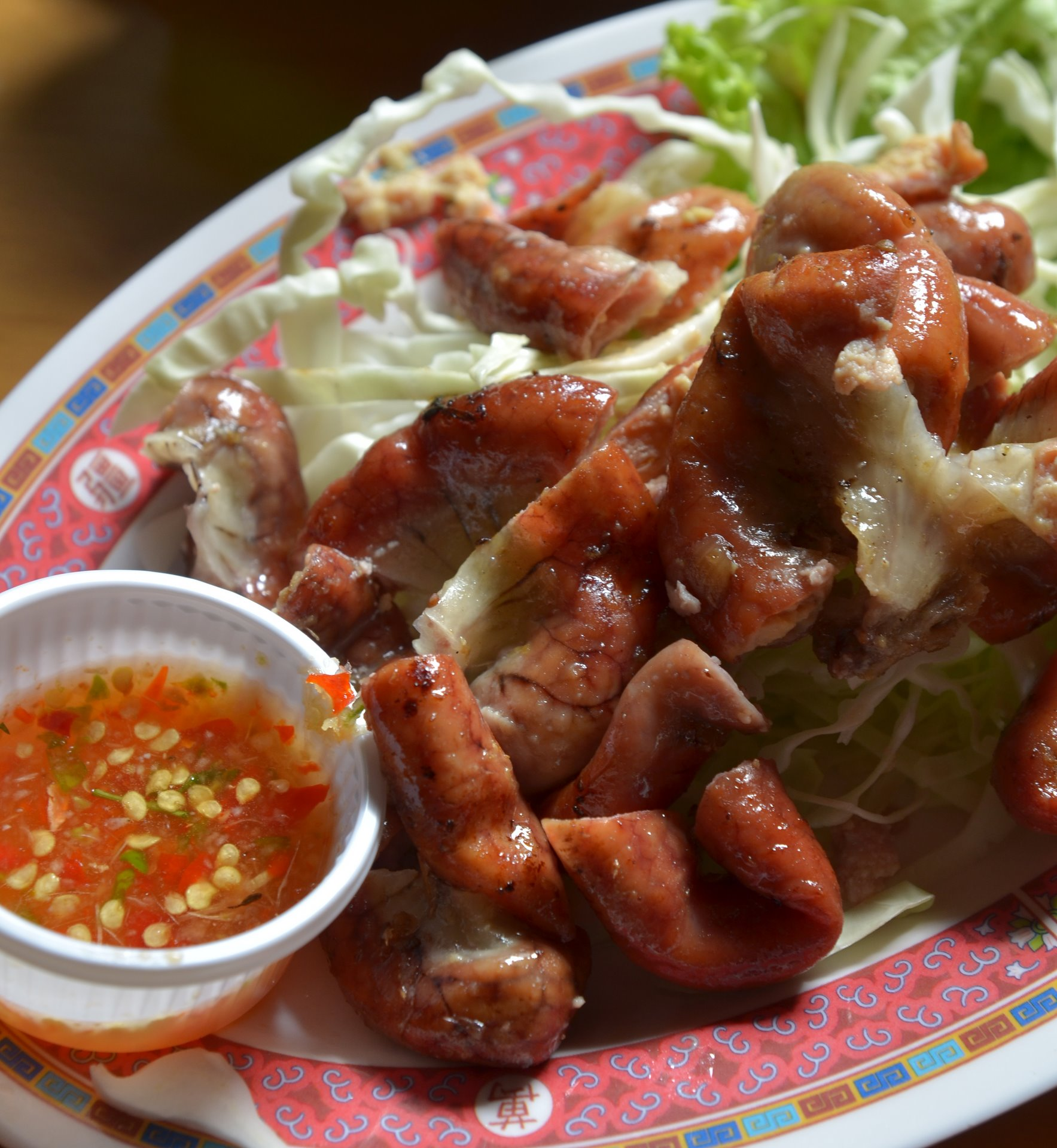
Sai mu thot, deep-fried pork intestines, here served with spicy nam chim (Thai dipping sauce)

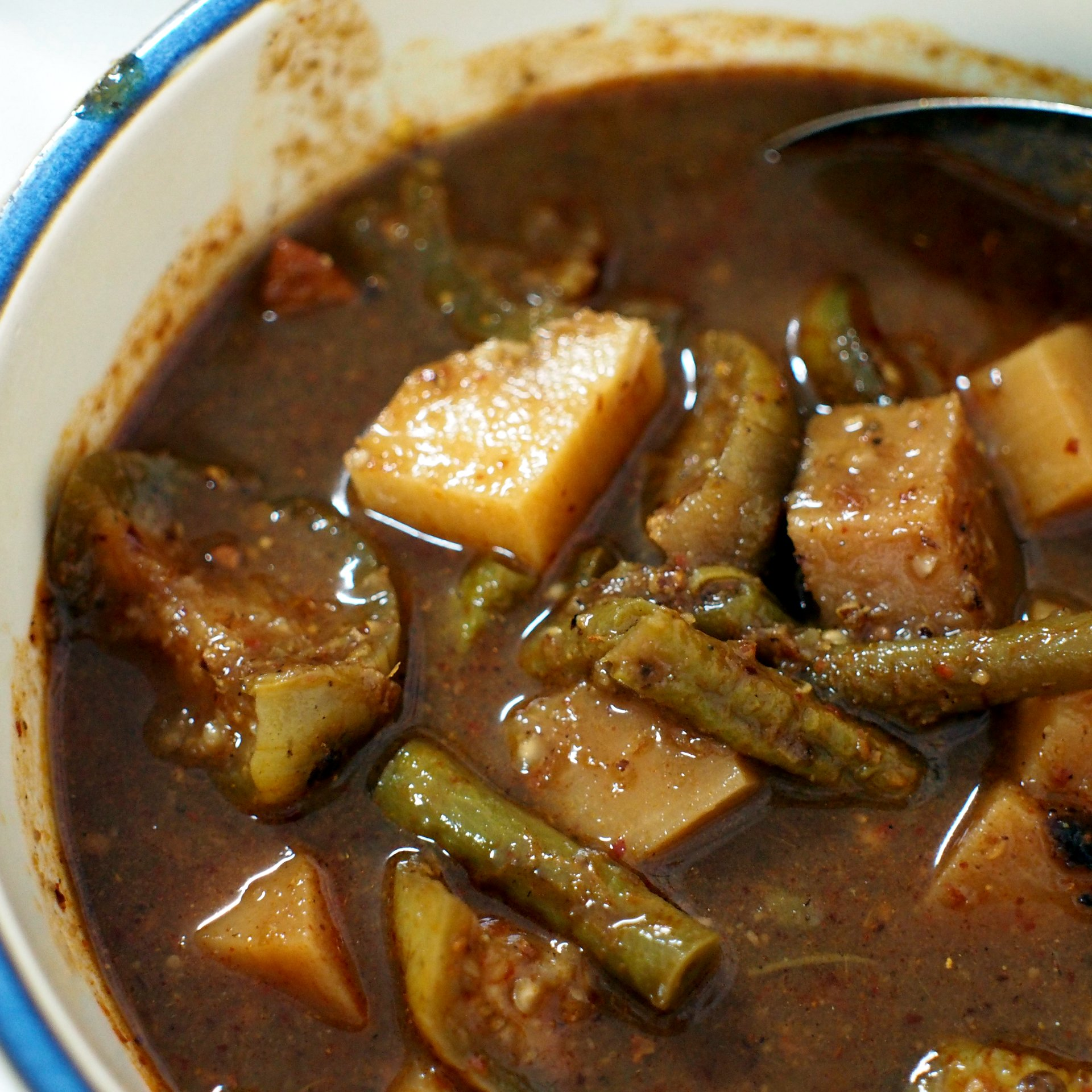
The sauce of kaeng tai pla is made from fish innards.

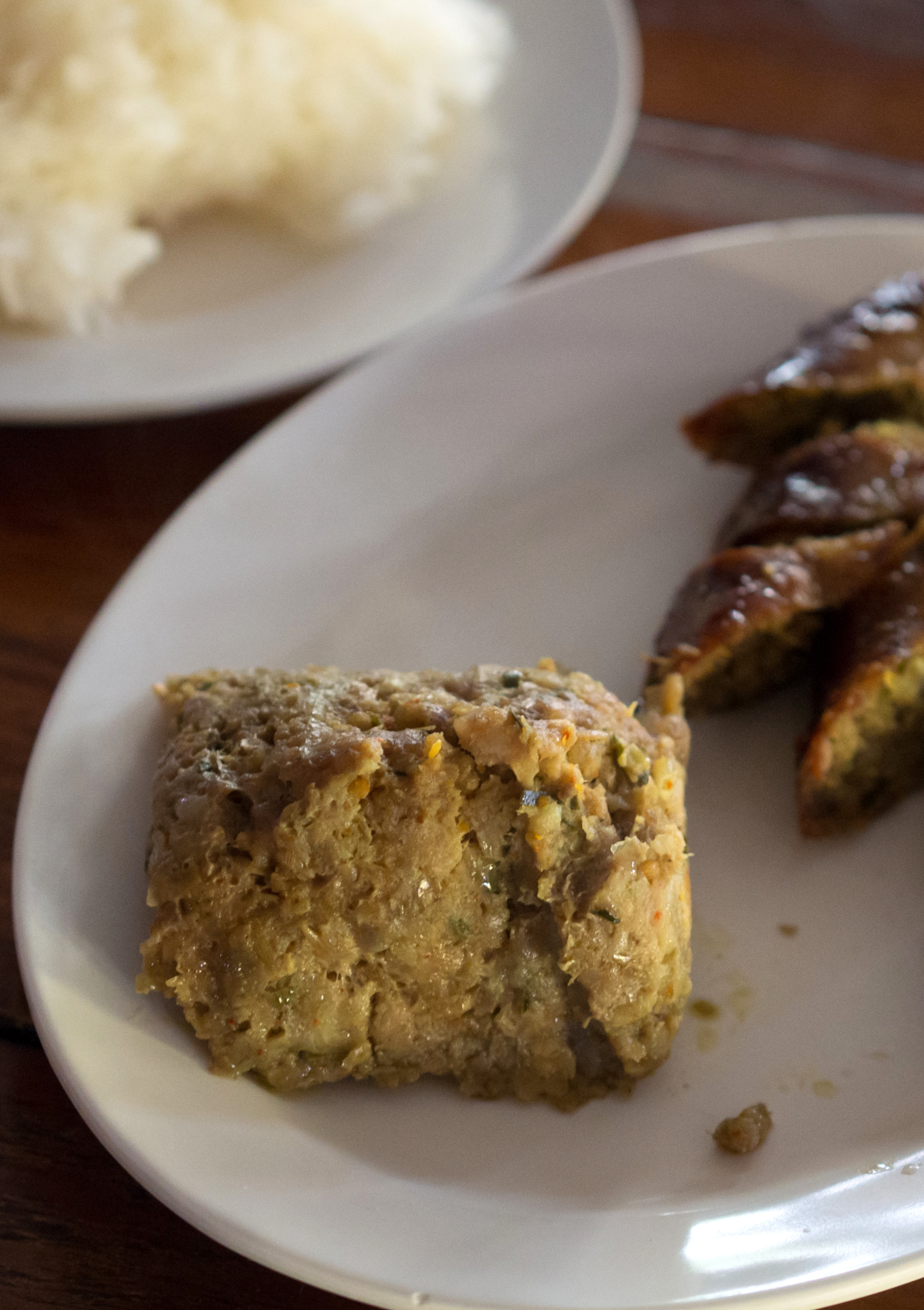
Aep ong-o, a northern Thai dish of chopped pig's brain mixed with egg and a Thai curry paste. It is wrapped in banana leaves and grilled.

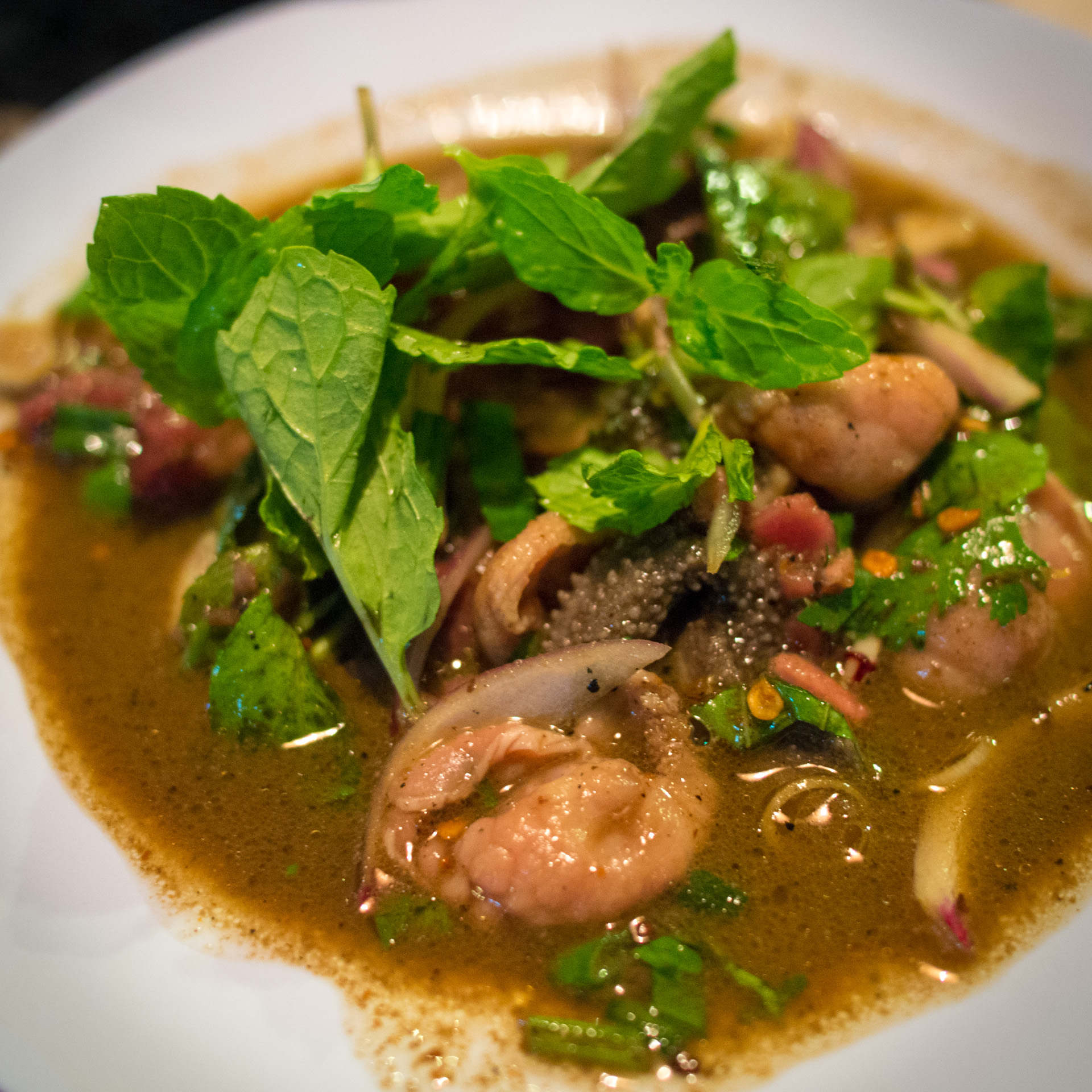
Sa nuea sadung is a northern Thai "salad" of semi-raw beef cuts, including sliced stomach. This particular version also contains nam phia, which are the contents of the first stomach of a cow.

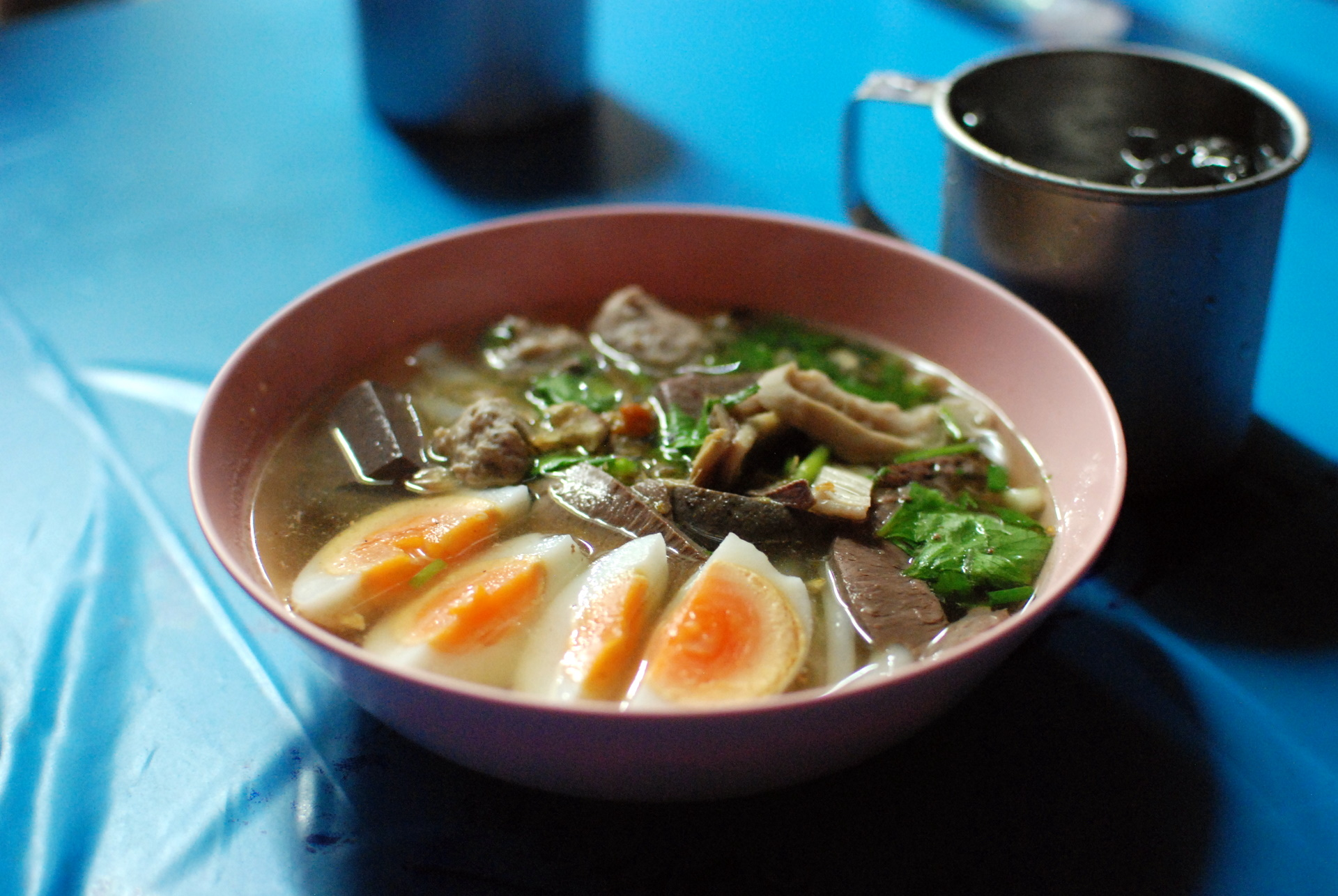
Kuaichap is a Thai Chinese noodle soup containing intestines and liver.

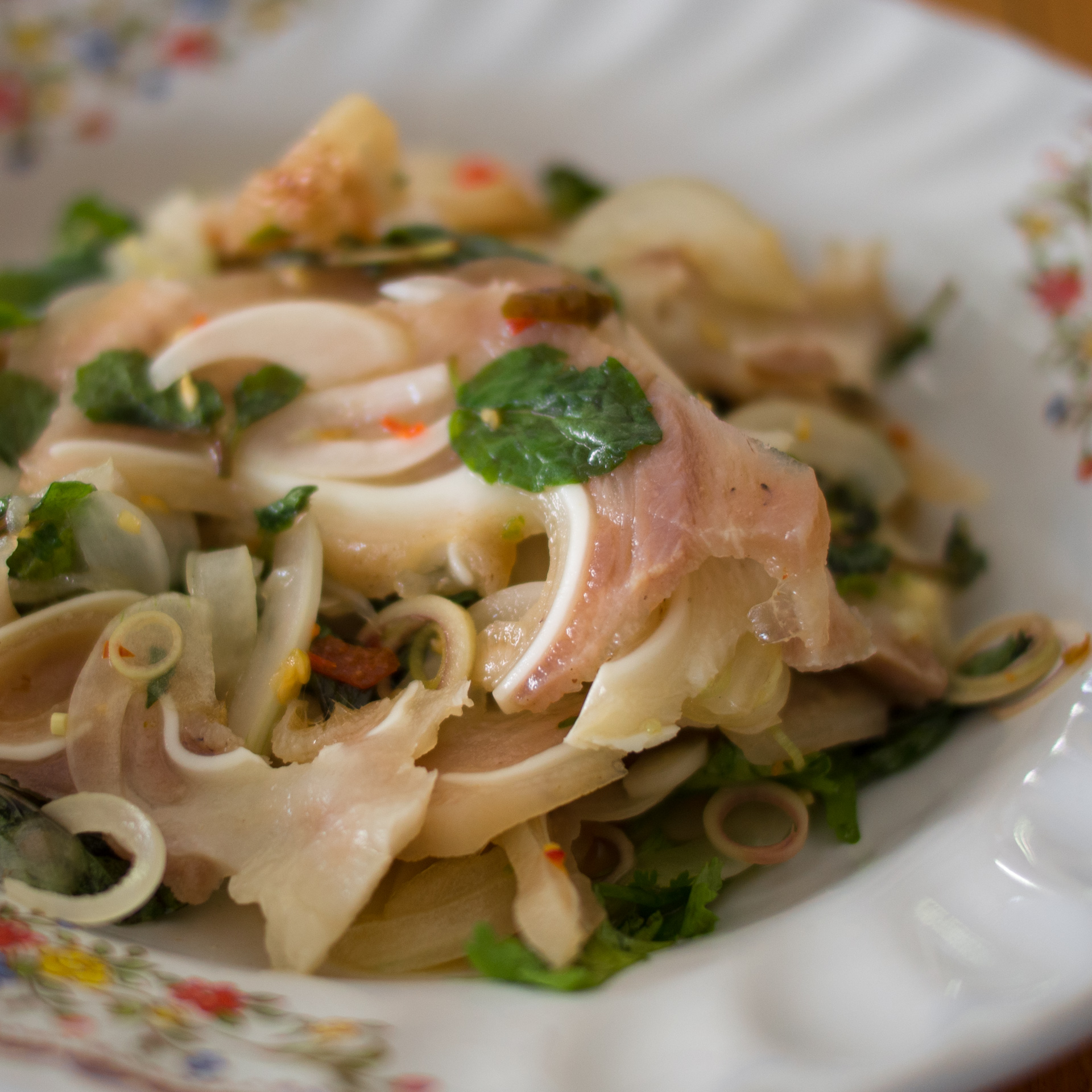
Yam hu mu is a spicy Thai salad made with slices of boiled pig's ears.

=== Vietnam ===
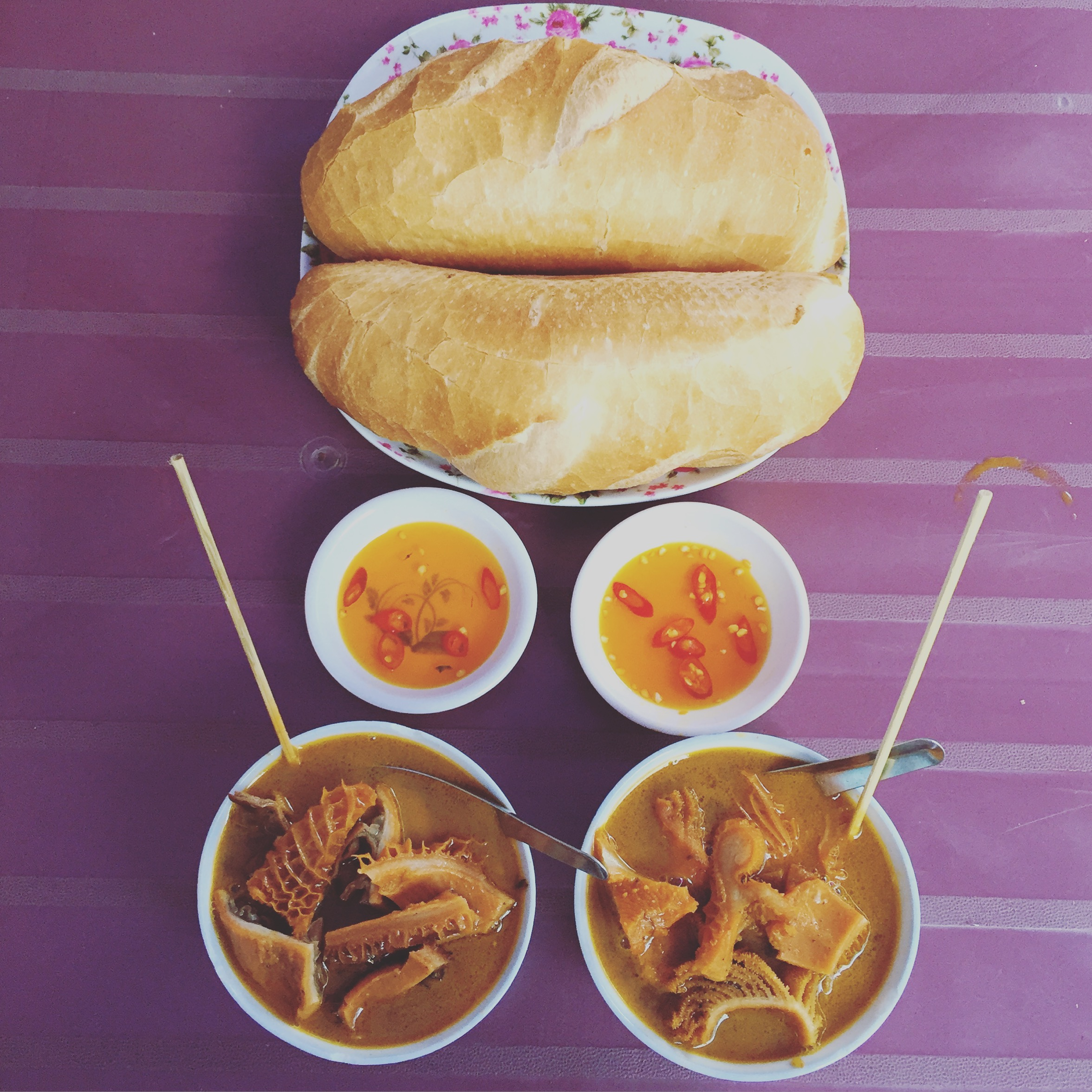
Phá lấu as served in Vietnam

In Vietnam, food made of internal organs is popular. Some dishes like Cháo lòng, Tiết canh use pig's internal organs as main ingredients. Cỗ lòng, a suite of boiled internal of pigs is a delicacy. Bún bò Huế is a noodle soup made with oxtail and pigs' knuckles, often made including cubes of congealed pigs' blood. Beef tendon and beef tripe is used in southern Vietnamese versions of Pho.

Phá lấu, or beef offal stew, is a popular snack in southern Vietnam. The dish contains all sorts of organ meat and is often accompanied by Vietnamese bánh mì and sweet-and-sour dipping sauce.

== South Asia ==
=== India and Pakistan ===
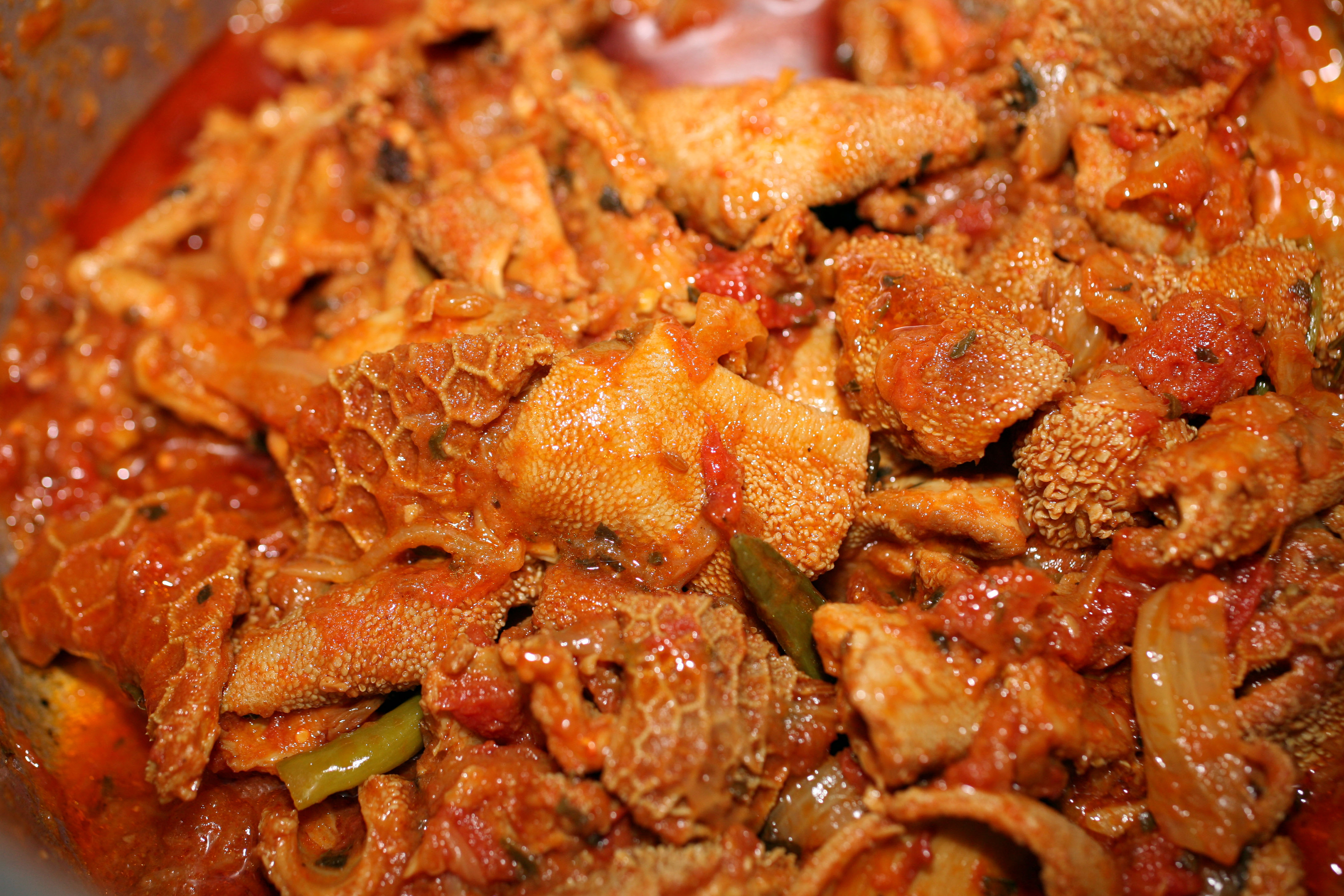
Pakistani Ojhari lamb stomach curry

In India and Pakistan, the goat's brain (maghaz), feet (paey), head (siri), stomach (ojhari or but), tongue (zabaan), liver (kaleji), kidney (gurda), udder (kheeri) and testicles (kapooray) as well as chickens' heart and liver are staple. Kata-Kat, a popular dish, is a combination of spices, brains, liver, kidneys, and other organs. In northern hilly regions of India, goat's intestines are cleaned and fried with spices to make a delicacy called bhutwa. Barbecued chicken tail (dumchi) can be found on the menu of many street food sellers in Lahore, Pakistan.

==== South India ====
In Hyderabad, lamb and goat brain sautéed and stir-fried with spices (often called bheja fry) is a delicacy and often conflated with the city. In the city of Mangalore, a spicy dish called raghti, made of heavily spiced porcine offal and cartilaginous tissue, is considered a homely indulgence by the local Christian community.

In Tamil Nadu, goat spleen is called "suvarotti". Suvarotti is also known as 'manneeral', even though some say that both are little different. Suvarotti means it sticks to the wall. It is believed because of this nature, the nutrients from the suvarotti sticks to our body.

Goat spleen/Suvarotti/Manneral is cleaned and in a whole piece. Goat spleen is highly rich in Iron, it drastically increases haemoglobin levels in blood and kicks out anemia. Goat spleen has both iron and vitamin C and so the iron in it is easily absorbed by the body.

==== West India ====
Sorpatel is a popular pork gravy consumed by Christians in Goa and Mumbai. The name comes from the word sarapatel meaning ‘confusion’ as the thick gravy is heady with spice, vinegar, and contains the heart, liver, ears, tongue and sometimes the blood of a pig. Less commonly, pig tails, noses and lungs are also added.

Among Goan Christians, roasted beef tongue is also a staple at any meal laid out for a party. Chicken dishes frequently include the gizzard, heart and liver of the bird, and Goan sausage choris or chouriço contains spicy, tangy pork pickled in vinegar and the local liquor feni before being cased in pig intestines. It is a popular Goan food regularly consumed during the monsoons when fish is scarce.

==== Northeast India ====
In the state of Meghalaya, a number of offal dishes, primarily porcine, are prepared by the Khasi community. Jadoh (blood rice) is red rice dish that uses pig blood and is consumed as breakfast by the Khasi tribe during festival days. Dohjem or Doh Neiiong (black sesame pork) has pork intestines and belly cooked in a spicy dark sauce. Doh Khleik is a traditional pork salad consisting of pig brains and meat. Doh Pheret is a pot of stew with various organs slow cooked for hours, Doh Snier are sausages in the form of spiced and molten fat in intestine casing, and Doh Snam are intestine-cased blood sausages.

=== Bangladesh ===
In Bangladesh, a bull's or goat's brain (mogoj), feet (paya), head (matha), stomach skin (bhuri), tongue (jib-ba), liver (kolija), lungs (fepsha), kidney and heart (gurda) are delicacies. Chickens' heart, gizzard (gi-la) and liver are also enjoyed.

=== Nepal ===
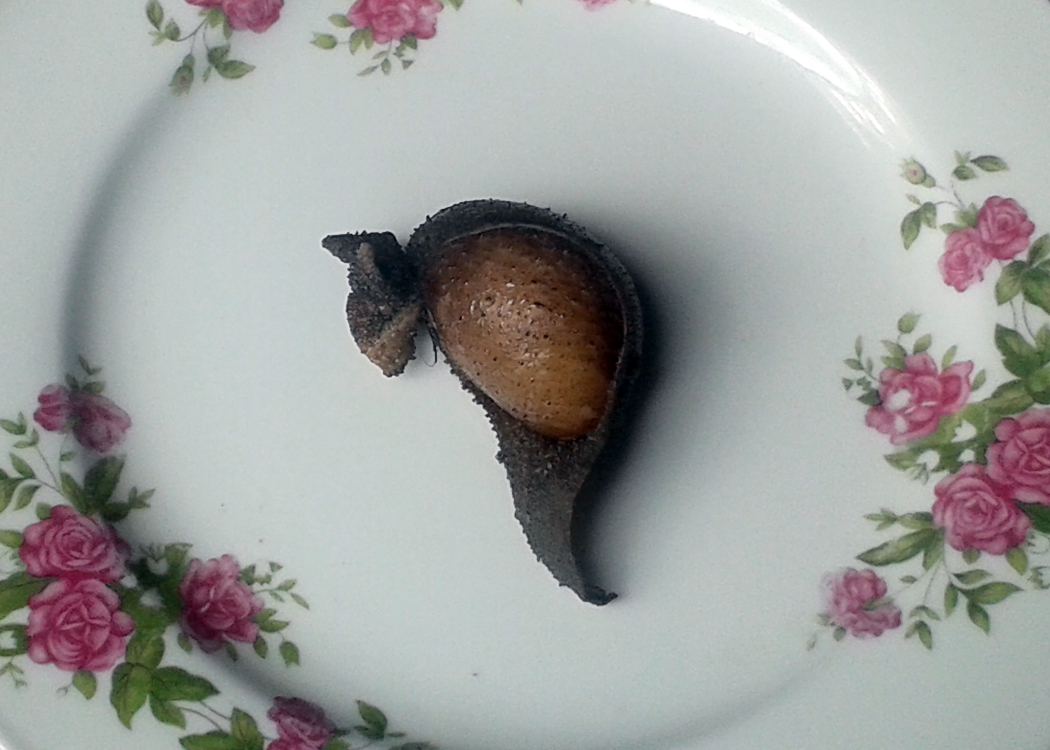
Tripe bag stuffed with bone marrow from Nepal

In Nepal, various types of offal are valued parts of traditional cuisine, particularly during the Dashain festival, when families gather for feasts. Goat offal such as brain (gidi), feet (khutta), bone marrow (masi), stomach (bhudi), tongue (jibro), liver (kalejo), kidneys, lungs (fakso), intestines (aandra), and some communities also prepare blood-based dishes. Some preparations include fried intestines and stomach, grilled ears and tails, and dishes made from stuffed or cooked organ meats. Chicken offal, especially hearts, livers, and gizzards, is also appreciated. In the Kathmandu Valley, Newar cuisine includes specialties such as sapu mhichā (leaf tripe stuffed with bone marrow), swan pukā (stuffed goat lung), and pukālā (fried varieties of organ meats). These dishes are often enjoyed during celebrations and family gatherings.

== Middle East ==
The dish is known in Kuwait, Bahrain, and other Persian Gulf countries as Pacha (پاچة), too. A variation of that is found in other Arab countries, such as in Egypt, and is known as Kawari' (Arabic: كوارع). It is still eaten by Iraqi Jews.

=== The Levant ===
Jerusalem mixed grill (Hebrew: מעורב ירושלמי, romanized: meorav yerushalmi) is a popular dish and local specialty originating in the Mahane Yehuda Market that consists of chicken hearts, spleens, and liver mixed with bits of lamb cooked on a flat grill, seasoned with onion, garlic, black pepper, cumin, turmeric, and coriander.

In Syria, lamb brain is used in nikhaat dishes and sometimes as a sandwich filling. A tradition practised less often today would be to eat fish eyes either raw, boiled, or fried. Another popular dish in the region surrounding is korouch, which is rice-stuffed sheep intestine. Raw mutton liver known as qasbeh nayyeh (sometimes lungs) is also occasionally consumed (when the animal's origin and processing is trusted). The meelaq is a traditional dish based on liver, kidney and (sometimes) the heart (which is strictly speaking muscle).

In Palestinian cuisine, an offal dish called mʻlāq (معلاق) is made for Eid al-Adha using the intestines of the sacrificed lamb. It typically contains kidney, liver, lung, and hearts, which are fried or grilled with tomatoes, onions, garlic, and spices. It's also eaten as a breakfast dish in Hebron, where its made with cow or lamb intestines and parsely.

=== Iran ===
It is also eaten in Iran, where it is known as Kaleh Pacheh.

In Iran, tongue (zabaan), feet (paa) or Kaleh Pacheh, sheep liver (jigar), heart (del), lungs (shosh), testicles (donbalan) and kidneys are used as certain types of kebab and have a high popularity among people, as well as sheep intestines and stomach, though the latter is boiled. Sheep skull and tongue, alongside knee joints, as a formal breakfast dish called kale pache (lit. "head and leg"), are boiled in water with beans and eaten with traditional bread.

=== Iraq ===
Sheep brain is eaten in Iraq. Pacha (Persian term), is a traditional Iraqi dish made from sheep's head, trotters, and stomach; all boiled slowly and served with bread sunken in the broth. The cheeks and tongues are considered the best parts. Many people prefer not to eat the eyeballs, which could be removed before cooking. The stomach lining would be filled with rice and lamb and stitched with a sewing thread (Arabic: كيبايات).

=== Egypt ===
Egyptian kibda

In Egypt, fried beef and lamb liver (kibda) with a cumin-based coating is a popular dish, most often served in sandwiches with a bit of onion from small shops in most major cities. Thin-sliced fried liver with slices of mild peppers, garlic, and lemon is considered a speciality of Alexandria (as كبدة سكندراني Kibda Skandarani, "Alexandrian liver"), and is often served as a separate plate, sandwich, or topping for kushari.

Cow brain is eaten in Egypt, as are sheep brains.

== North America ==
=== United States ===
One way to horrify at least eight out of ten Anglo-Saxons is to suggest their eating anything but the actual red fibrous meat of a beast.

— M.F.K. Fisher, How to Cook a Wolf (1942)

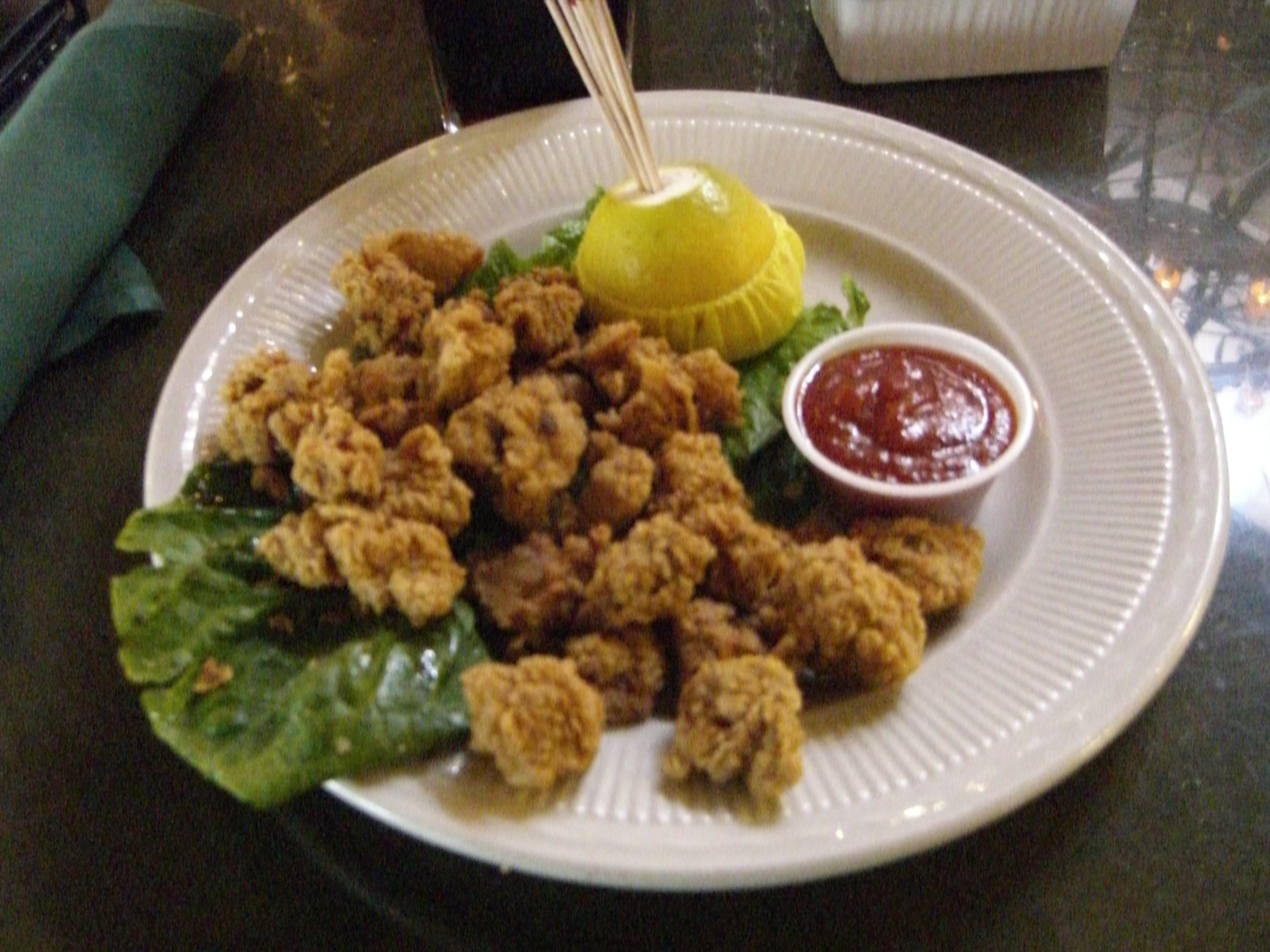
Rocky Mountain oysters

Although the term offal is used in the United Kingdom and Canada, in the United States the terms variety meats or organ meats are usually used instead. In the United States, some regional cuisines make extensive use of certain organs of specific animals. The derisive term "mystery meat" is often used to describe offal which have been ground or otherwise heavily processed in order to obscure its origin.

In the United States, the giblets of chickens, turkeys, and ducks are much more commonly consumed than the mammal offal. Traditional recipes for turkey gravy and stuffing typically include the bird's giblets (the traditional Thanksgiving meal in the US). Use of organs of mammals is not common, except for the liver, which is common to a certain degree. Examples include liver sausage (braunschweiger) and pâté. Liver and onions is a traditional, "classic" menu item in diners throughout the country, often as a "blue plate special".

Mammal offal is somewhat more popular in certain areas. In the American South, some recipes include chitterlings, livers, brain, and hog maw. Scrapple, sometimes made from pork offal, is somewhat common in the Mid-Atlantic region, particularly in Philadelphia and areas with Amish communities. Pepper Pot soup (frequently served in Philadelphia) is made from beef tripe. Fried-brain sandwiches are a speciality in the Ohio River Valley. Rocky Mountain oysters, "prairie oysters", or "turkey fries" (beef testicles) are a delicacy eaten in some cattle-raising parts of the western US and Canada. In South Carolina, pork liver and other organ meats are often cooked into "hash", a kind of stew.

Offal dishes from many other cultures exist but the appeal is usually limited to the immigrant communities that introduced the dish. For example, chopped liver, lungen stew, and beef tongue (especially as used by Kosher delis) in American Jewish culture, or menudo in Mexican-American culture.

Ironically, given its provenance and history, offal has started to be reintroduced as an item of haute cuisine, with stylish restaurants offering roasted bone marrow, fried pork rind, tongue or heart as part of their menus.

African-American slaves were often given throw-away parts of meat during slavery. Black slaves would consume chitterlings during the winter. Undesirable parts of an animal such as neck bones, hog maws, pig ears and pig feet, were given to the African American slaves to eat.

=== Mexico ===
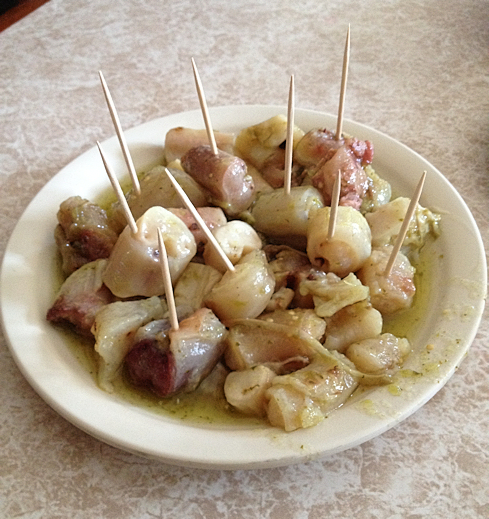
Sautéed bull penis served as an appetizer in Oaxaca, Mexico

In some Latin American countries, such as Mexico, almost all internal parts and organs are consumed regularly. Chicken hearts, gizzards and livers are usually eaten fried or boiled, either alone, or in broth.

Several types of offal are commonly used in tacos, including:

- tacos de lengua: boiled beef tongue
- tacos de sesos: beef brain
- tacos de cabeza: every part of the cow's head, including lips, cheeks, eyes, etc.
- tacos de ojo: cow's eyes
- tacos de chicharrón: fried pork rinds (chicharrón), a common snack food item
- tacos de tripas: beef tripe (tripas)

In many of the regional cuisines of Mexico there are dishes made of offal. Menudo is a typical dish made of tripe that is native of the border region with the United States. While Menudo is cooked with hominy, in Central Mexico the tripe does not have hominy. This dish is called "pancita". Cow offal such as kidneys and liver are popular in the entire country, in dishes such as "higado encebollado" or "riñones a la Mexicana". The bone marrow from the cow forms the basis of various soups such as the typical dish of Mexico City, such as "sopa de medula". The northern region is cattle country and is famous for its tacos de "tripa de leche", made of cow intestines and the south consumes pig intestines ("tripita"). The whole pig, from snout to tail including genitals (such as the boiled, then fried penis are named "machitos"). Head cheese is common. The skin can be fried ("cueritos") or pickled ("cueritos en vinagre") and are found in stores and restaurants all over Mexico. Pig brains ("sesos"), cheeks and eyes and other parts are eaten throughout the country with many variations. These parts have curious names such as "nana", "bofe", "pajarilla" "nenepil". Pig throat tacos ["buche"] are very popular in the border region. Fried lamb offal, is popular in Central Mexico, especially the stomach ("panza"), which is somewhat similar to haggis. Mexico City has taquerias that offer the whole pig in their menu. Chicken innards are ubiquitous in Mexico such as sweetbreads ("sopa de molleja" or innards ("sopa de dentros de pollo").

=== Caribbean Islands ===
Sheep's or goat's head are eaten as part of the barbacoa, a dish originating with the Taino people. Cow cod soup is a traditional Jamaican dish made with bull penis. Morcilla (blood sausage), Chicharrón (fried pork rinds), and other pork offal are commonly served in a Puerto Rican Cuchifrito. Sopa de mondongo, made with tripe, is common in the Caribbean and throughout Latin America. Gandinga is a hearty stew, well known in Cuba and Puerto Rico, prepared from the heart, liver, kidneys, and oesophagal tissue of either pork (gandinga de cerdo) or beef (gandinga de res).

== Australia ==
In Australia offal is used in a few dishes inherited from British cuisine; liver may be used in liver and onions, and kidney in steak and kidney pie, as well as in some recipes for rissoles. Lamb brains are occasionally crumbed and fried. Other forms of offal are consumed in some ethnic dishes. Australian food standards require that products containing offal be labelled as such. The presence of brain, heart, kidney, liver, tongue or tripe must be declared either by specific type or more generally as offal. Other offal, such as blood, pancreas, spleen and thymus must be declared by name.

== Health and food safety ==
The offal of certain animals is unsafe to consume:

- The internal organs of the fugu pufferfish are highly toxic—in Japan, fugu can only be prepared by trained master chefs, working under extremely strict regulations, sanitary conditions, and licensing. Even a residual portion of fugu toxin can be fatal.
- The liver of the polar bear is unsafe to eat because it is very high in vitamin A and can cause hypervitaminosis A, a dangerous disorder. This has been recognized since at least 1597 when Gerrit de Veer wrote in his diary that, while taking refuge in the winter in Novaya Zemlya, he and his men became gravely ill after eating polar-bear liver. Seal liver is similarly toxic, as is dog liver.
- Some animal intestines are very high in coliform bacteria and need to be washed and cooked thoroughly to be safe for eating.
- Nervous system tissue can be contaminated with TSE prions, which cause bovine spongiform encephalopathy (BSE, "mad cow disease"); in some jurisdictions these offal are classified as specified risk materials and are subject to special regulations.
- Offal very high in purines can precipitate an acute attack of gout in someone with the condition.
- Certain types of offal, including kidneys, stomach, intestines, heart, tongue, and liver, can be very high in saturated fats.
- The practice of feeding raw offal to dogs on farms and ranches can spread echinococcosis, a potentially fatal parasitic disease of animals, including humans.
- The United Kingdom banned the sale of animal brains in order to curtail the spread of mad cow disease in the 1980s and 1990s.
- A similar ban is imposed by the Food and Drug Administration on animal lungs in the United States due to concerns such as fungal spores or cross-contamination with other organs, although these concerns have been criticized as unfounded.

== See also ==
- Faggot (food)
- Pig bladder
- Peasant foods
- Maggot farming
- Mystery meat

Chefs noted for their work with offal

- Fergus Henderson, St John (London, England)
  - The Whole Beast: Nose to Tail Eating, Henderson's highly regarded book on the subject
- Chris Cosentino, Incanto (San Francisco, California, United States)

== Bibliography ==
- Edwards, Nina (2013). Offal: A Global History. London: Reaktion Books. ISBN 9781780230979. OCLC 809911205.
- Helou, Anissa (2011). Offal: The Fifth Quarter (revised ed.). Bath, England: Absolute Press. ISBN 9781906650551. OCLC 751861350.
  - First edition: Helou, Anissa (2004). The Fifth Quarter: An Offal Cookbook. Bath, England: Absolute Press. ISBN 9781904573210. OCLC 56650909.
- McLagan, Jennifer (2011). Odd Bits: How to Cook the Rest of the Animal. Berkeley, Calif.: Ten Speed Press. ISBN 9781580083348. OCLC 694832866.
