= Menudo (Mexican soup) =

Mexican soup

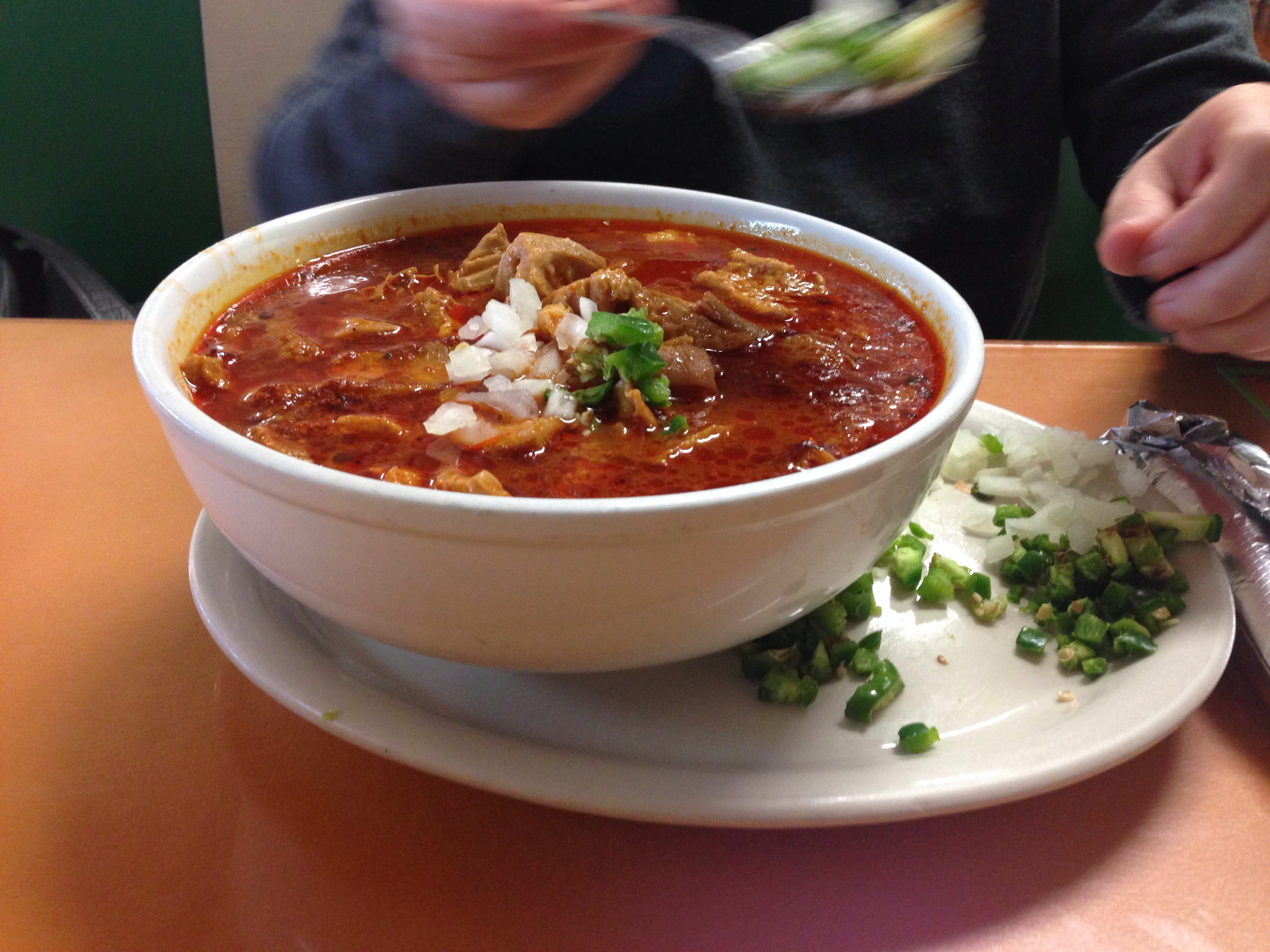
- Alternative names: Mondongo
- Place of origin: Mexico
- Main ingredients: Beef tripe (cow stomach), broth, hominy, lime, onions, cilantro, oregano, red chili peppers
- Variations: Menudo colorado (made with chili added to the broth): menudo blanco (made without red chili peppers)

Menudo, also known as Mondongo, pancita ([little] gut or [little] stomach) or mole de panza ("stomach sauce"), is a traditional Mexican soup, made with cow's stomach (tripe) in broth with a red chili pepper base. It is the Mexican variation of the Spanish callos or menudo. Similar dishes exist throughout Latin America and Europe including sopa de mondongo, guatitas, dobrada; trippa alla romana in Italy, or patsas in Greece.

Hominy (in Northern Mexico), lime, onions, and oregano are used to season the broth. It differs from the Filipino dish of the same name, in that the latter does not use tripe, hominy, or a chili sauce.

== History ==
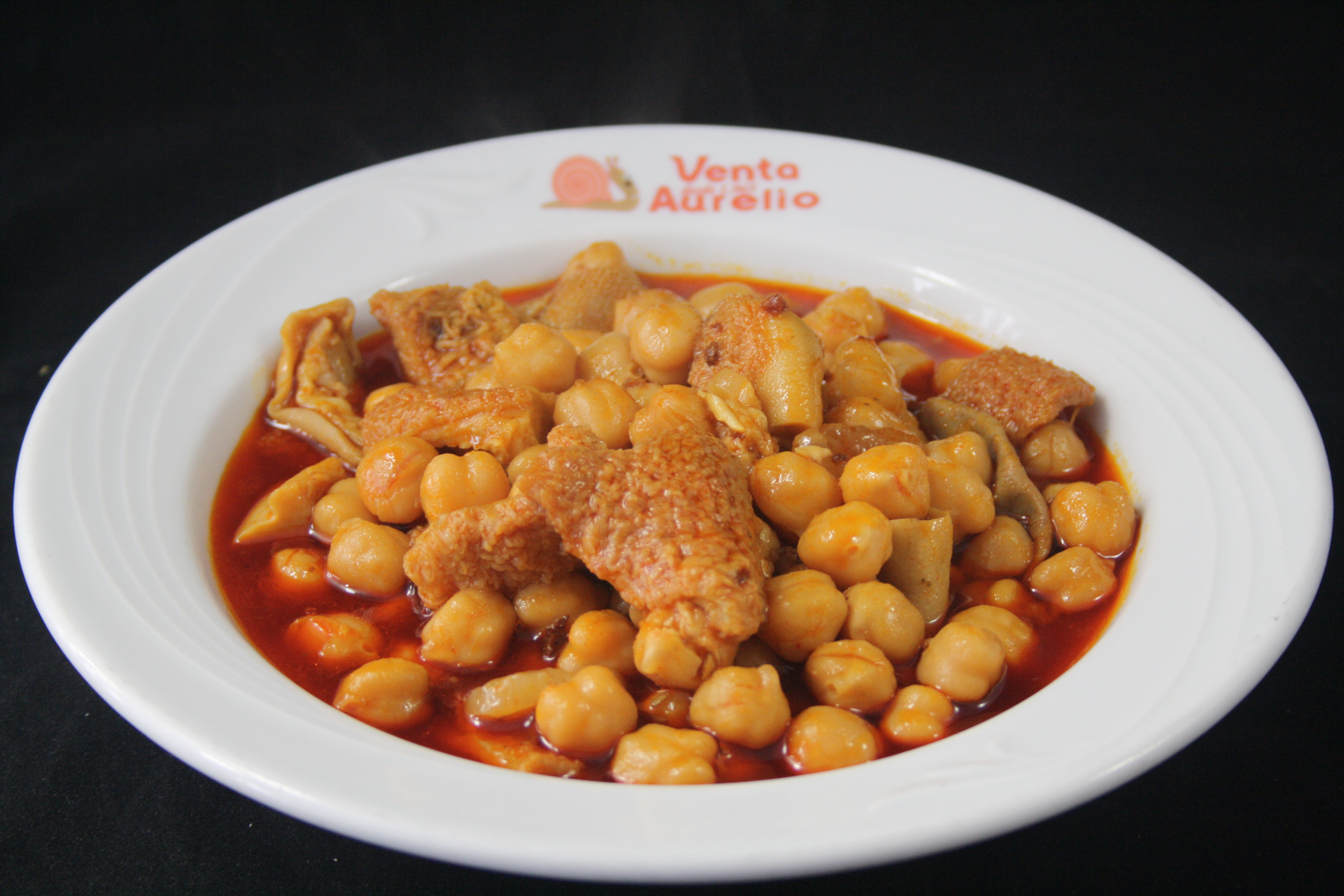
Spanish menudo from Cádiz. In certain areas of Spain, chickpeas or garbanzos are added.

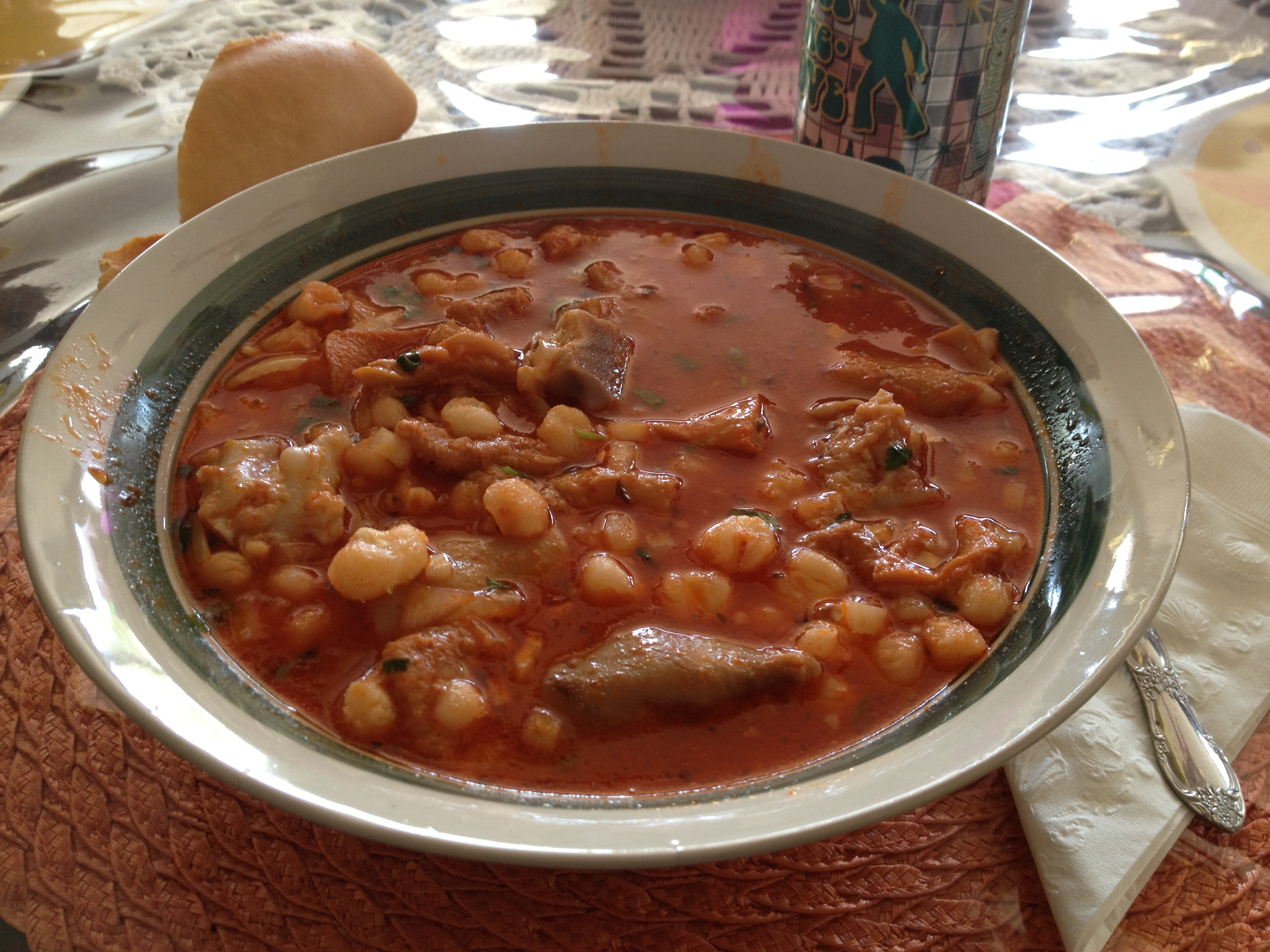
Mexican menudo. In certain areas of northern Mexico, hominy is added.

Tripe soups of both beef and mutton have been traditional in Spanish cuisine since at least the 14th century. Don Enrique de Villena refers to them disparagingly in his 1423 Arte Cisoria, saying:

"Some eat the tongue and the intestines and tripe and lungs, and are not, in taste or health, such that they should be given to good and fine people."

The first part of the novel Guzmán de Alfarache (1599) mentions the protagonist eating beef tripe callos.

With the Spanish colonization of the Americas, the Spanish introduced the tradition of menudo or tripe soups throughout the Americas, including Mexico. The specific Spanish predecessors of Mexican menudo are Southern Spanish menudos, which are red and may include garbanzo beans, just as corn in parts of Mexico: Menudo Gitano (Gypsy menudo), Menudo Andaluz, Menudo Sevillano, and Menudo Gaditano (Cádiz).

In the Mexican cookbook Nuevo y Sencillo Arte de Cocina, Reposteria y Refrescos (1836), Antonia Carrillo includes many menudo recipes, including a beef or mutton caldo de menudo (menudo soup), a veal menudo soup, and a menudo sopa (bread pudding).

In his cookbook Diccionario de Cocina o El Nuevo Cocinero Mexicano (1845), Manuel Galvan Rivera defined “menudo” in Mexico as:

MENUDO: Although this word includes the stomach, feet, blood and head of the cattle that are killed, in cuisine it is commonly understood as only the stomach or “pancita” and the tripe. For lambs, it also includes the liver and all the extremities, as stated below.

== Regional variations ==
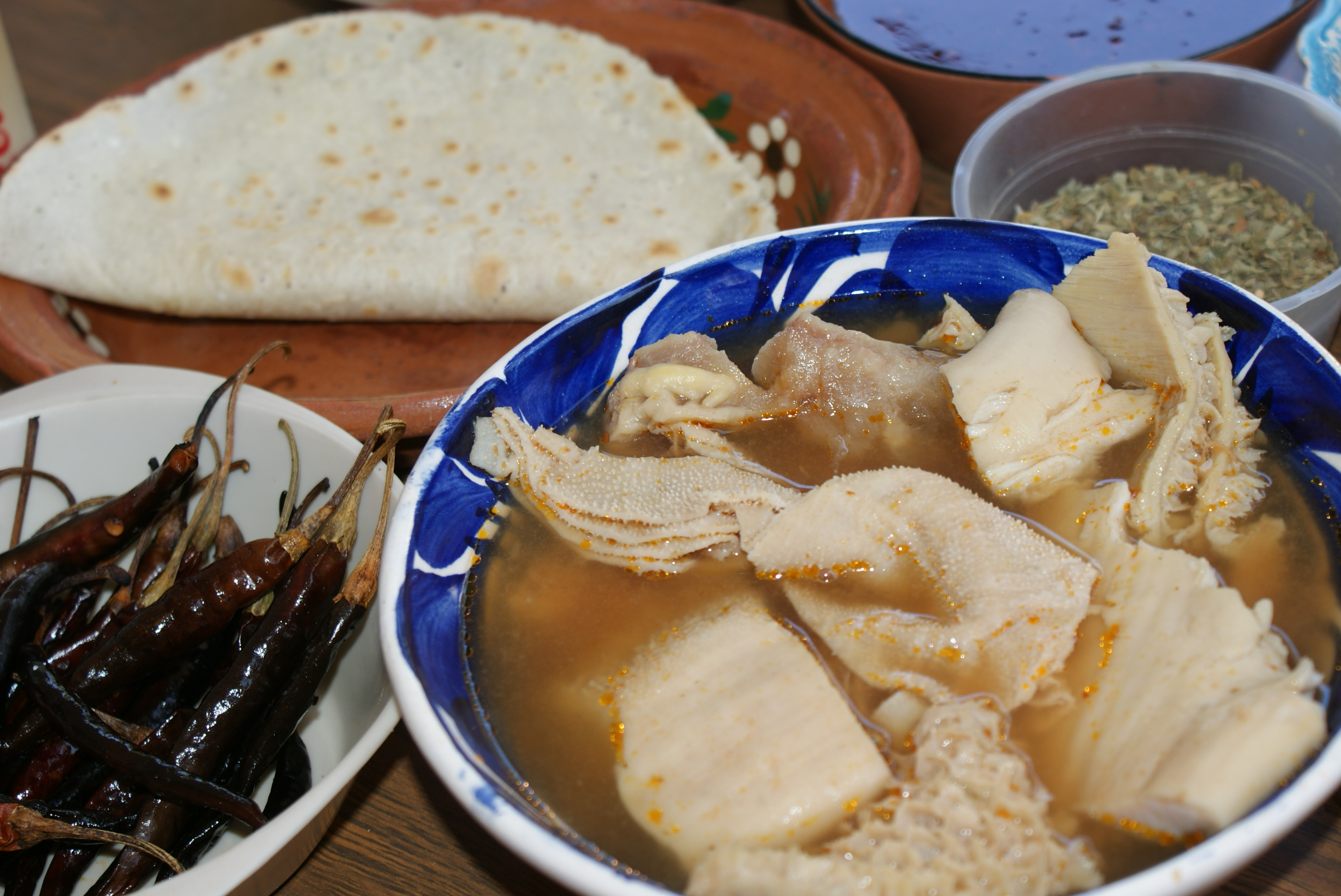
A bowl of menudo blanco

There are a number of regional variations on menudo. In northern Mexico, hominy is typically added. In northwest states such as Sinaloa and Sonora usually only the blanco, (white) variation is seen; menudo blanco is the same dish, but red pepper is not added (though jalapeño or chopped green chilies may be included to replace the spice in the red version), thus giving the broth a clear or white color. In some areas of central Mexico, "menudo" refers to a stew of sheep stomach, pancitas stew of beef tongue. In south-western Mexico (in and around the Distrito Federal, Morelos, and Guerrero) it is called panza or panza guisada. The red variation is usually seen in the northern state of Chihuahua and Nuevo León. Only yellow hominy is usually used in menudo in Texas. A similar stew made with more easily cooked meat is pozole. Some variations of menudo substitute garbanzo beans instead of hominy.

=== Menudo in the United States ===
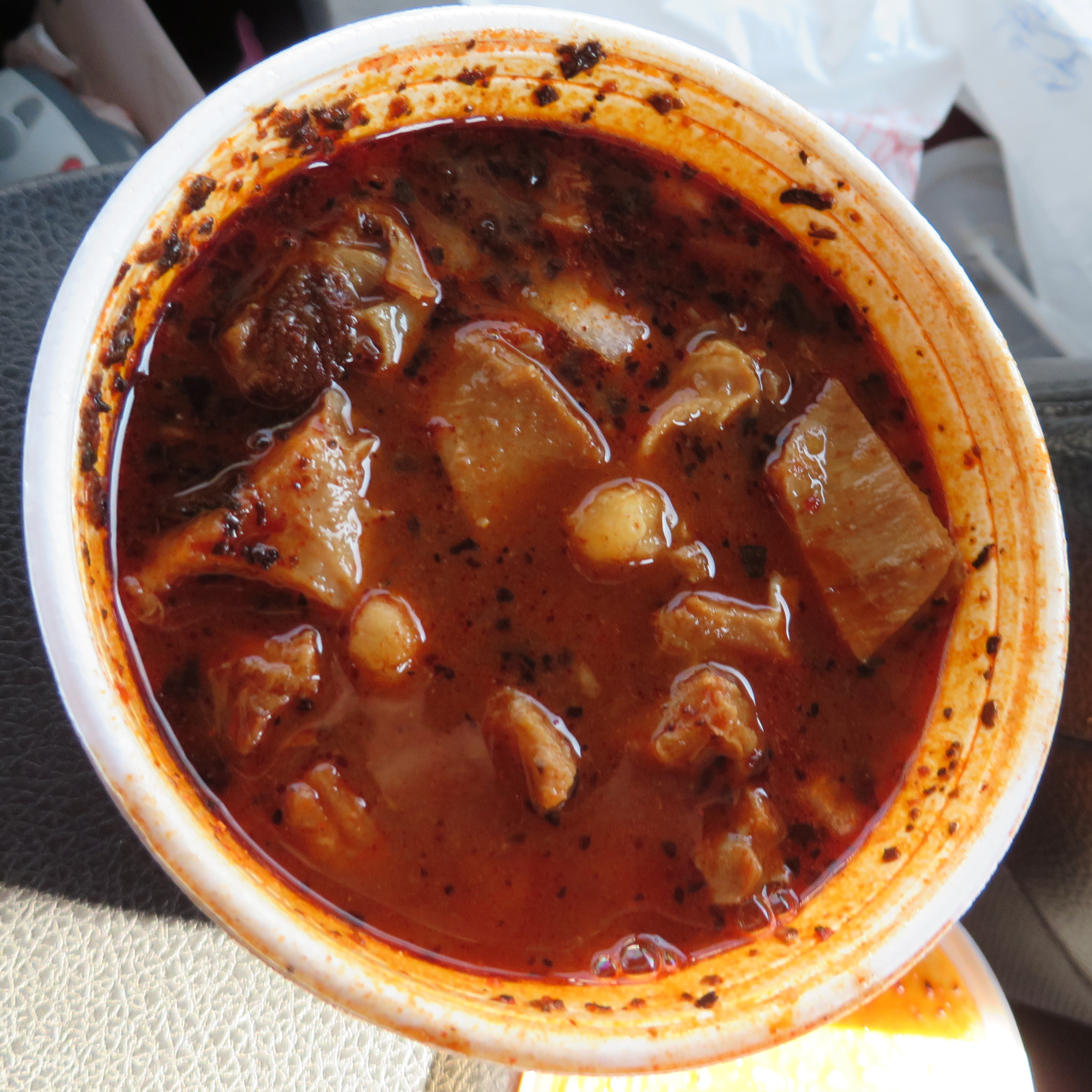
Menudo served in Houston

In Southern Arizona the typical adornments for menudo blanco are freshly chopped green onion and cilantro, lemon, and ground chiltepín. Adding patas (beef or pig's feet) to the stew is popular in the United States. In the United States, since the mid-20th century, prepared menudo has been common in food stores and restaurants in cosmopolitan areas and in other areas with a significant Mexican population. Restaurants often feature it as a special on Saturday and Sunday, and some believe menudo alleviates hangovers. Canned menudo is also available.

An annual Menudo Festival is held in Santa Maria, California. In 2009, more than 2,000 people attended and 13 restaurants competed for prizes in three categories. The festival is organized by the National Latino Peace Officers Association of Northern Santa Barbara County and the money raised goes toward scholarships for local students.

Since 1996, the Menudo Bowl is an annual event in Laredo, Texas. In 2019, over 30 teams participated to make the best menudo. The event is organized by Laredo Crime Stoppers, with teams conformed by public officials, law enforcement, media representatives, and members of the community. The event is attended by people from both sides of the US–Mexico border.

=== Cultural significance ===
In the United States, among Tejanos and Chicanos, menudo is traditionally prepared by the entire family, and often serves as an occasion for social interactions such as after wedding receptions where the families of the newlyweds go to one of their family's houses to enjoy a bowl of menudo before and after the ceremony. It is also believed to be a hangover cure.

Menudo takes a long time to prepare as the tripe takes hours to cook. It includes many ingredients and side dishes (such as salsa), and is garnished with chopped onions, chiles, cilantro, and often with lime juice; it is often prepared communally and eaten at a feast.

Documents from the American Works Progress Administration indicate that in the 1930s, among migrant workers in Arizona, menudo parties were held regularly to celebrate births, Christmas, and other occasions.

It is typically served with chopped raw onions, oregano, diced chiles (usually serrano), and lemon or lime segments along with corn or flour tortillas.

== Gallery ==
Menudo variations

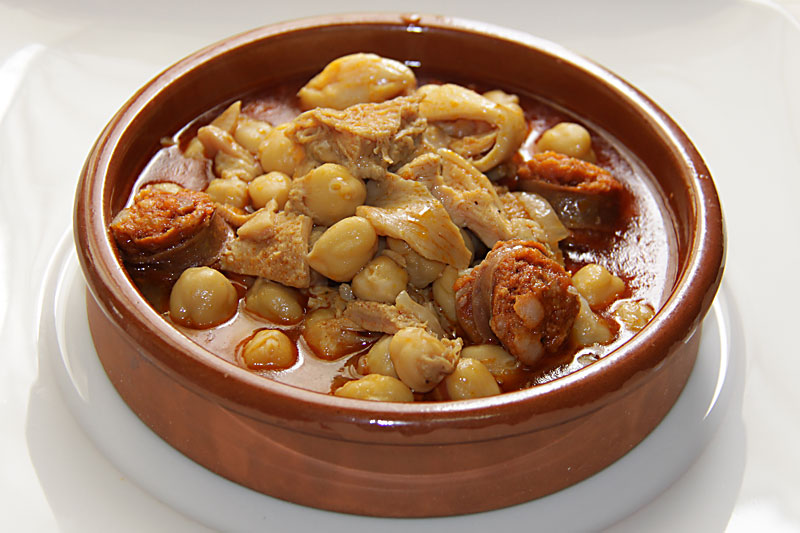
Spanish menudo with garbanzo beans and chorizo sausage

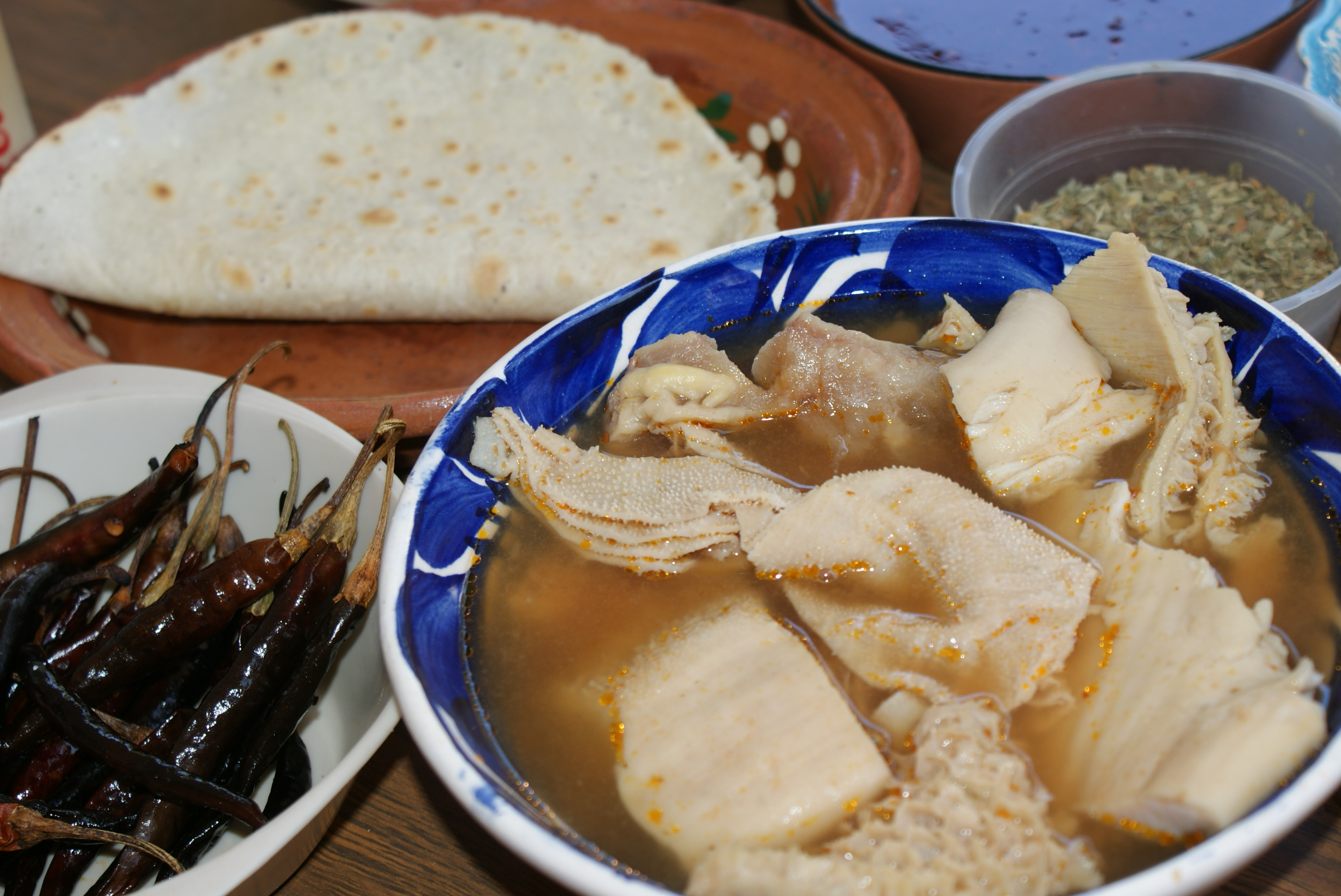
Mexican menudo blanco or white menudo

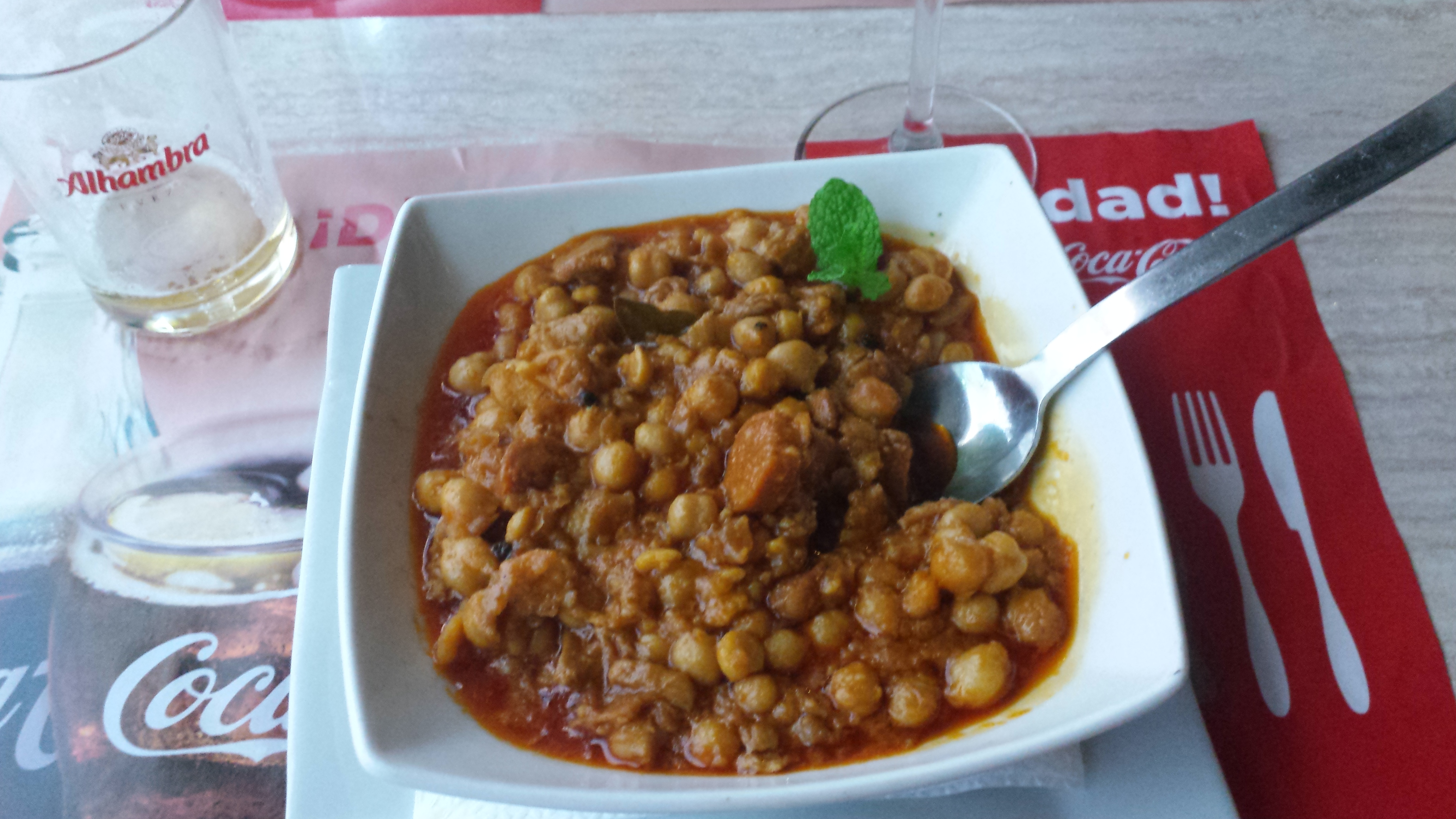
Spanish menudo from Cádiz

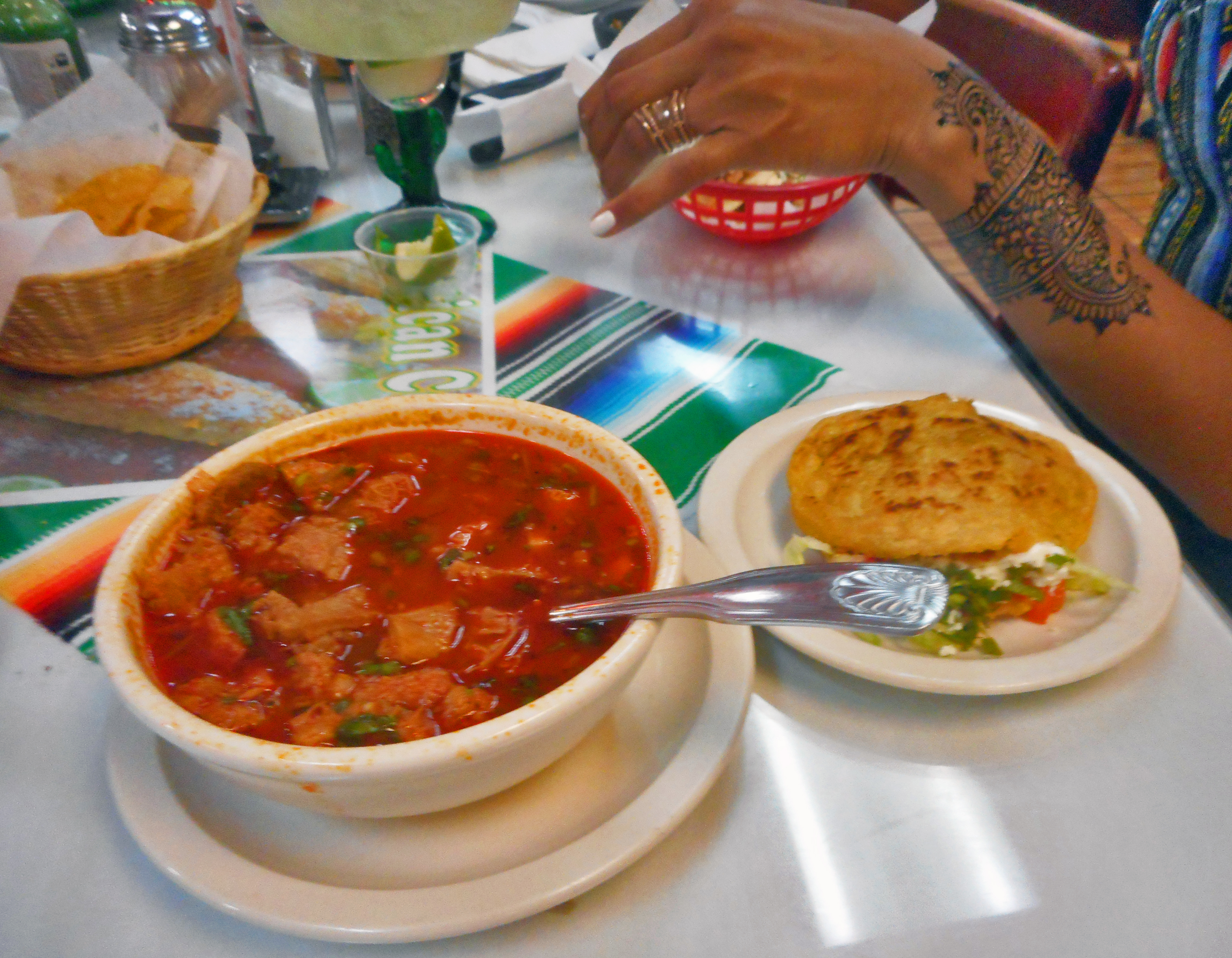
Mondongo (menudo) soup and gordita. In southern Mexico and Gulf Coast, menudo is known as mondongo

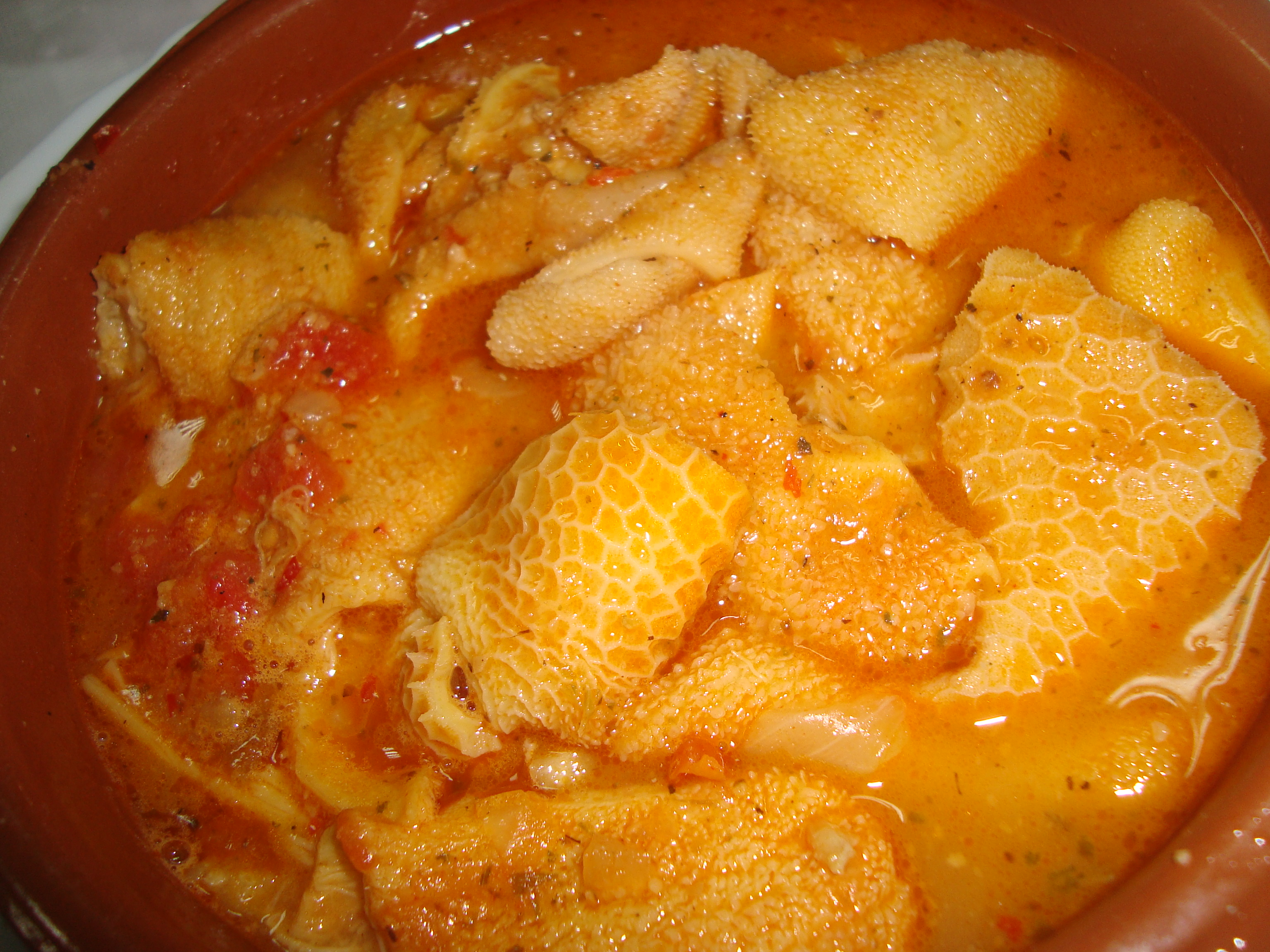
Spanish callos from Valencia, made with lamb tripe

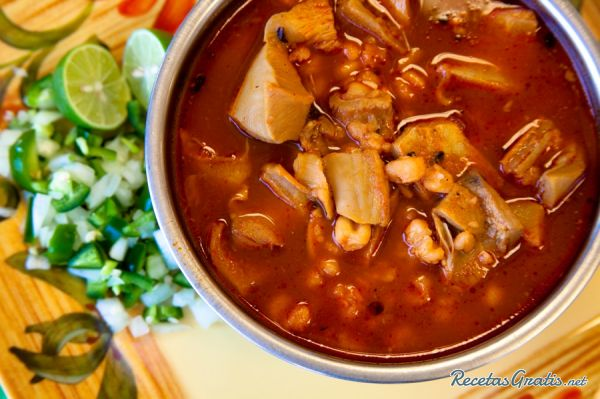
Mexican Menudo rojo (Red menudo)

== See also ==
- Callos a la Madrileña
- Tripes à la mode de Caen
- Flaki
- İşkembe çorbası
- List of Mexican dishes
- List of soups
- Californian cuisine
