= Gras-double =

French tripe dish

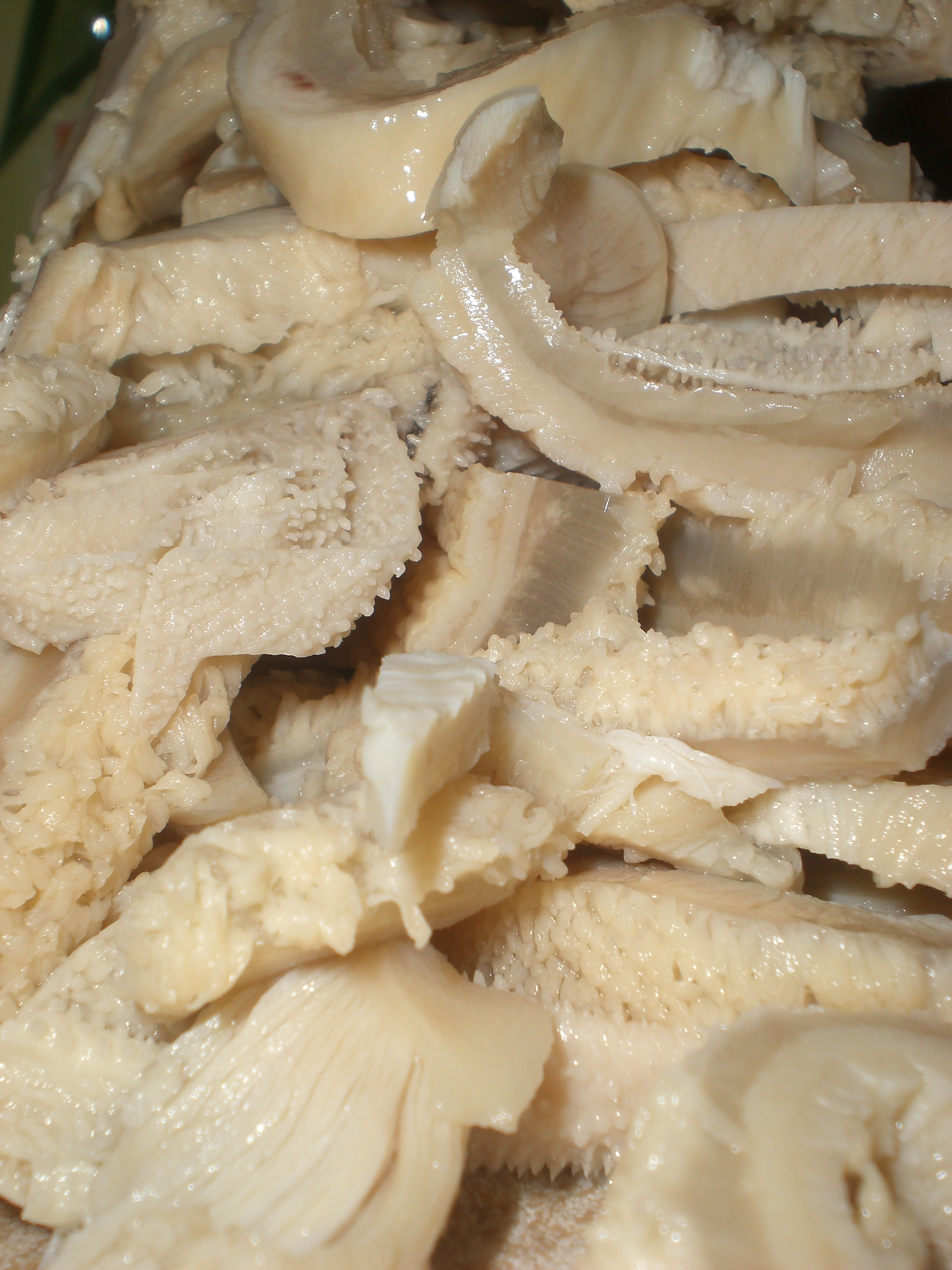
Gras-double: culinary preparation of tripes.

Gras-double (French pronunciation: [ɡʁa dublə]), in French cuisine, is the smooth part of beef tripe, the rumen, most favoured for cooking. It means 'double-fat', describing the thickness and color of the cut, not its fat content.

== Cooking ==
Gras-double is sold fresh or pickled, uncooked or cooked. According to Larousse Gastronomique, if uncooked it requires 3 to 3½ hours cooking in a salt water court-bouillon. Pickled gras-double requires 1 to 1½ hours of cooking in salted water.

Larousse lists ten variants of gras-double dishes:

| | Main ingredients and cooking method |
|---|---|
| Gras-double de bœuf en blanquette | Gently cooked in stock, butter and flour, with egg yolks, parsley and lemon juice added before serving |
| Gras-double de bœuf à la bourgeoise | Cooked, cut into squares, cooked with onions and carrots |
| Gras-double de bœuf à la fermière | Cooked, simmered with onion and carrots and mushrooms |
| Gras-double de bœuf, frite pané | Cooked, cut into squares, dipped in egg and breadcrumbs and fried. Served with a spicy sauce |
| Gras-double de bœuf à l'espagnole | Cooked, cut into squares, marinated in oil and lemon juice and grilled. Served with fried onions and fried tomatoes |
| Gras-double de bœuf à la lyonnaise | Cooked, cut into thin strips and fried in butter or lard with chopped onion |
| Gras-double de bœuf à la polonaise | Cooked, cut into thin strips and fried in butter, sprinkled with chopped hard-boiled egg yolks and parsley, drizzled with vinegar or lemon juice |
| Gras-double de bœuf à la portugaise | Cooked, cut into squares and simmered with tomatoes |
| Gras-double de bœuf à la poulette | Squares of cooked gras-double with allemande sauce or poulette sauce, with parsley, lemon juice and mushrooms |
| Gras-double de bœuf à la provençale | Gently cooked in stock, lard and flour, with egg yolks, basil and lemon juice added before serving |

Source: Larousse Gastronomique.

Other ways of preparing gras-double include dacquoise (boiled with ham and onions), albigeoise (slow-cooked with vinegar, cloves, garlic and saffron) and languedocienne (cooked, toasted and served with mayonnaise).

== See also ==
- Tripe

== Sources ==
- Delpuech, Urbain (1995). La Cuisinière toulousaine. Paris: Solar. ISBN 978-2-26-302214-2.
- Montagné, Prosper (1976). Larousse Gastronomique. London: Hamlyn. ISBN 978-0-600-02352-4. OCLC 1285641881.
