= Guatita =

Ecuadorian tripe stew

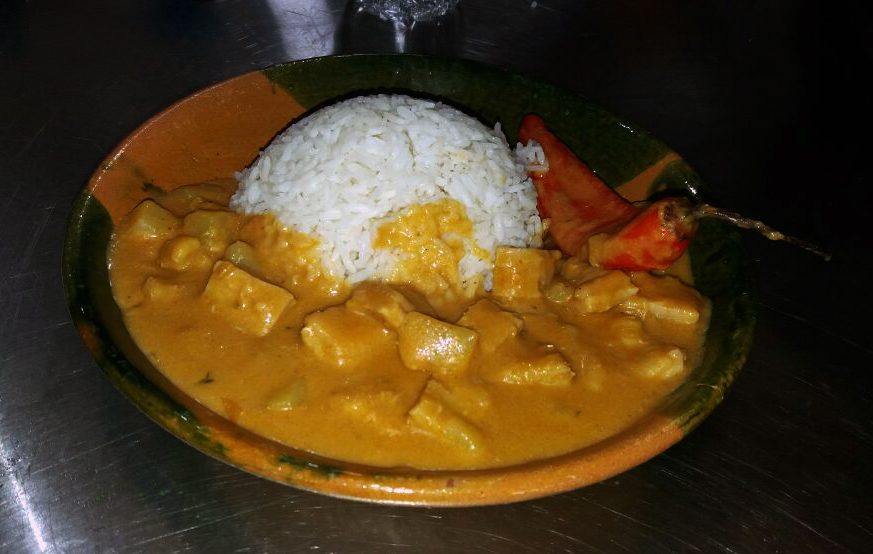
- Alternative names: Guatita criolla
- Type: Stew
- Main ingredients: Tripe

Guatita ([little] gut or [little] belly, from Spanish: Guata; "Gut/Belly"), or guatita criolla, is a popular dish in Ecuador, where it is considered a national dish, and in Chile. It is essentially a stew whose main ingredient is pieces of tripe (cow stomach), known locally as "guatitas". The tripe is cleaned several times in a lemon-juice brine, after which it is cooked for a long time until the meat is tender. Then it is allowed to cool and finely chopped. There are various vegetarian versions of the dish in which wheat gluten is substituted for tripe. Other variations use strong-tasting fish such as tuna. The traditional Ecuadorian recipe is served hot and accompanied by potatoes and a peanut sauce.

The dish is often considered an acquired taste. Because of its strong taste, it is sometimes served in small quantities.

In Ecuador, it is believed that guatita helps relieve hangover symptoms. For this reason, it is often served by restaurants early on Saturday and Sunday mornings.

== Related dishes ==
- Mexico: Pancita, mondongo
- Colombia: Mondongo antioqueño
- Peru: Cau Cau a la limeña
- Panama: Mondongo a la culona
- Chile: Chupe de guatitas, guatitas a la jardinera
- Argentina: Mondongo rioplatense
- Paraguay: Seco de mondongo
- Ecuador: Caldo de mondongo
- Spain: Callos
- Dominican Republic: Mondongo

== See also ==
- List of Ecuadorian dishes and foods
- List of stews
