= Flaki =

Traditional Polish tripe stew

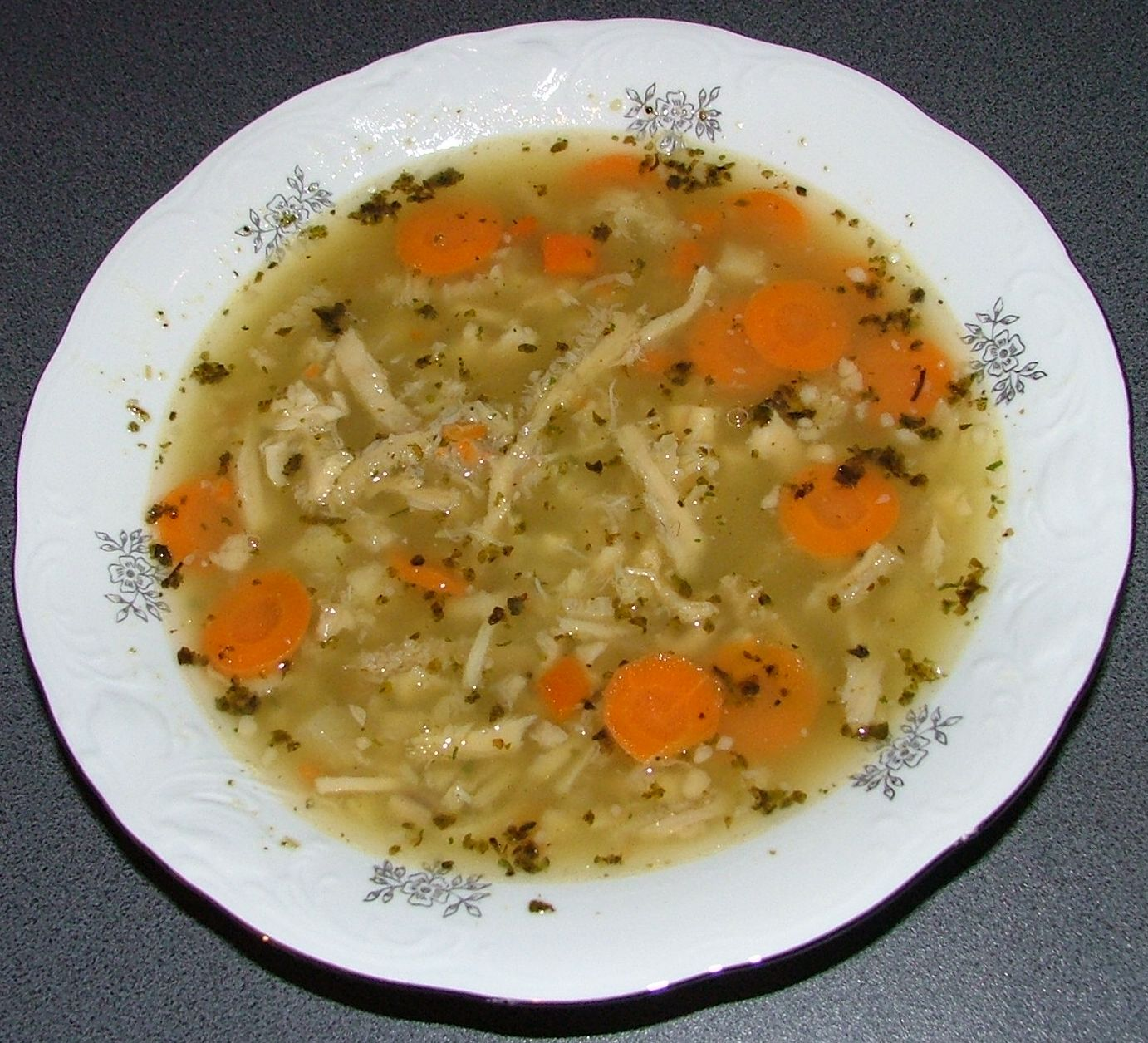
- Type: Tripe soup
- Place of origin: Poland
- Associated cuisine: Polish cuisine

Flaki (Polish: [ˈflaki]) or flaczki ([ˈflat͡ʂki]) is a traditional Polish tripe stew. It is one of the many Polish soups, which represent an important part of Polish cuisine. Along with bigos, żurek, and pierogi, it is one of the most notable specialities in Polish cuisine. Its name is derived from its main ingredient: thin, cleaned strips of beef tripe (in Polish: flaki - which can also be literally translated to "guts").

== Etymology ==
The Polish name flaki, literally meaning "guts" being the plural of flak ("guts"), came from German Fleck ("spot"), from Middle High German vlëc Old High German flec/flek, from Proto-Germanic *flekka- ("spot/mark"). Flaczki, the diminutive of flaki, is also used to refer to tripe soups in Poland. Croatian fileki is a cognate. German names for tripe soups include Kuttelsuppe and Flecksuppe ("tripe soup"), as well as Saure Kutteln and Saure Flecke ("sour tripes"), as the words Kuttel, Fleck, and Kuttelfleck can all mean "tripe".

== History ==
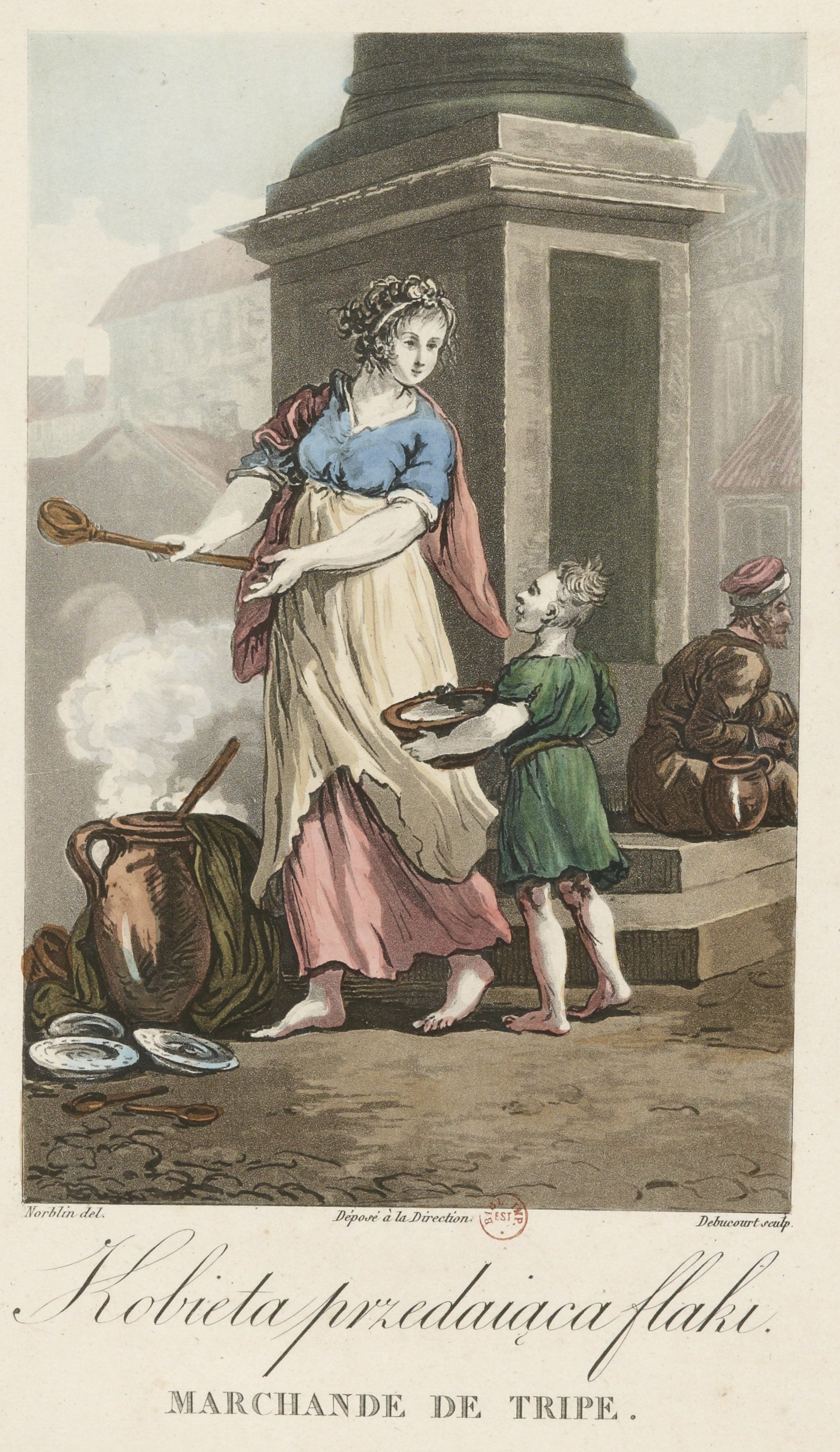
Flaki Merchant, an 18th-century painting by Jean-Pierre Norblin

Flaki has been consumed on Polish territory since at least the 14th century. It is known to have been one of the favorite dishes of King Władysław II Jagiełło.

== Preparation and serving ==
The method of preparation may vary slightly depending on the region. Some common ingredients include beef tripe, beef, bay leaf, allspice, parsley, carrot, beef broth, and spices to taste, including salt, black pepper, nutmeg, sweet paprika, and marjoram. Ready-made convenience-type equivalents of the labor-intensive flaczki are available. Sometimes pork tripe can be used instead of the beef tripe especially in the ready-made versions of the dish sold in Poland.

Tomato concentrate is sometimes added to flaki, and some may cook the tripe without a roux. A popular addition to improve the 'nobleness' is the addition of meatballs, which are often found in a regional variant known as 'flaki po warszawsku' (Warsaw-style flaki).

Ready-made flaki in cans or jars are widely available in grocery stores throughout Poland including the most popular "Flaki po Zamojsku" (Zamość-style Flaki) or "Flaki w Rosole" a version of dish in less spicy broth. Another variant of flaki, in which fowl stomach is used instead of cow's, is also known as ‘flaki drobiowe’ (poultry flaki). The soup is traditionally served during Polish weddings—as one of the "hot meals". Flaki is eaten with fresh bread, usually with bread roll. Many restaurants serve Flaki in a bowl made out of a carved loaf of fresh sourdough bread.

== See also ==
- İşkembe çorbası
- Menudo
- Sopa de mondongo
- Rosół
- Tripes à la mode de Caen
- Callos
- Khash (dish)
