= Callos a la Madrileña =

Spanish stewed tripe dish

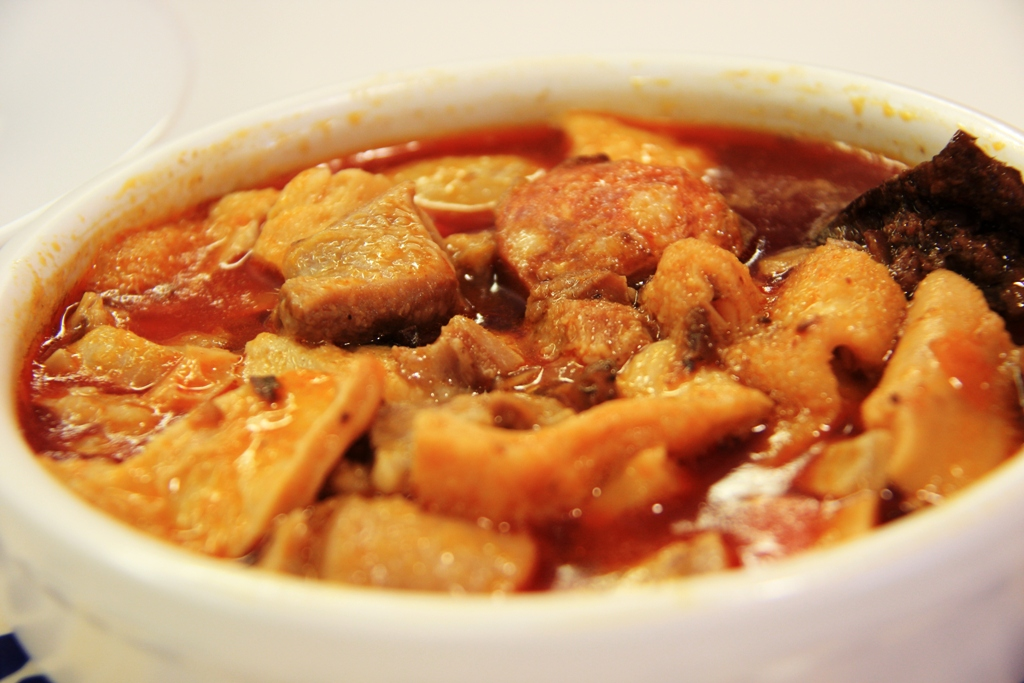
Callos a la Madrileña

Callos a la Madrileña is a stewed tripe dish, cooked slowly for hours over low heat, that is a speciality of Spanish cuisine associated with the city of Madrid. Traditionally, pig or cow tripe is used to make the dish, though modern recipes replace it with lamb or cod. When prepared correctly the broth is rich in gelatin and the tripe becomes very tender after the slow cooking process. The tripe can be browned before the cooking liquid is added, with trotters, oxtails, black pudding and other ingredients for the soup like ham, chorizo and smoked paprika. It is common to serve this stew with the morcilla blood sausage, a tapas dish typical of the region of Castile and León.

A version of the stew with chickpeas is made in the Philippines.

== See also ==
- Menudo (soup)
- Sopa de mondongo
- Tripes à la mode de Caen
- Flaki
- İşkembe çorbası
