= Food at the 1964 New York World's Fair =

Food at the New York World's Fair of 1964–1965 included dishes from American cuisine and varied international cuisines. When some Western European nations refused to attend the fair, due to a dispute between fair organizer Robert Moses and the World's Fair governing body, it created an opportunity for other countries to introduce affordable, ethnic cuisine to American fairgoers.

American cuisine was represented at 50 different restaurants representing the culinary traditions of various states. Smorgasbord could be found at the Minnesota Pavilion and recreations of colonial era dishes from the cuisine of New England were served at the New England States Pavilion. Many international cuisines were also represented including Chinese, Polish, Israeli, Korean, Indian, French, Norwegian and Swedish.

The World's Fair was an economic flop, but its cultural influence is still felt in today's culinary culture. Belgian waffles and sangria were introduced to the United States at the World's Fair. Among the other foods served were falafel, kimchi, hummus, tandoori chicken, and Turkish coffee.

== Background ==
A dispute between the organizer of the World's Fair, Robert Moses, and the governing body for the official World's Fairs resulted in Western nations like Italy, Germany, and France refusing to attend the World's Fair, which created an opportunity for Latin American, Asian, and African countries to introduce their affordable, ethnic cuisines to American fairgoers. The World's Fair has been described as "a coming-out party for all these other countries".

At the time of the World's Fair, New York City's selection of foods was more limited than it is in the present day—mostly pizza, corned beef sandwiches, and French haute cuisine. Other foods like Belgian waffles and falafel, which have since become ubiquitous street foods in the dining culture of New York City, were still largely unknown in the 1960s. The World's Fair has been called "the real introduction of the Belgian waffle to America", served topped with strawberries, whipped cream and powdered sugar at the "Belgian village", a recreation of an 18th-century Belgian town. The American-Israel pavilion, which served falafel at the fair, provided the following detailed explanation to introduce the dish to fairgoers: "spicy vegetable patty eaten between slices of a soft, round bread".

The World's Fair is viewed by most historians as more of a culturally significant event than an economic success, and its far-reaching impact on culinary culture is still felt today.

== American cuisine ==
The original plan was for a five-story "World of Food" pavilion, a tribute to American food culture, showcasing a model kitchen with exhibits from major American corporations, but some problems with the financing led to the unfinished pavilion being dismantled two weeks before its scheduled opening date. Some of the corporations that had originally planned to be at the pavilion, like Hershey's and Coca-Cola, found other spots throughout the fair, but American food was decentralized throughout the fair because of the dismantling of the pavilion, and some of the companies that had originally intended to participate at the "World of Food" pavilion did not attend at all.

There ended up being around 50 restaurants at various price points offering a selection of American dishes. The Missouri Snack Patio served barbecue ham and hot dogs. Smorgasbord was available at the Minnesota Pavilion, and recreations of colonial era dishes from the cuisine of New England at the New England States Pavilion. The Greyhound Post Houses offered a selection of classic dishes from American cuisine such as clam chowder, fried chicken, cornbread, and pecan pie.

== Pavilions ==
Bakers came from Europe to make Danish pastry for the fair's Denmark pavilion. Other Danish specialty foods included smorgasbord and fish that had been flown in from the Baltic and North Sea. The Japan pavilion served sukiyaki with shirataki noodles, with thinly sliced beef, vegetables, and bean curd, cooked at the table in a hot pot. Varieties of seafood and vegetable tempura were on the menu, and sushi with warm sake. The Indian pavilion, serving naan and tandoori chicken, was constructed to resemble an ancient temple. At the Korean teahouse costumed waitresses and entertainers performed folk dances for fairgoers who dined on kimchee and bulgogi. The Hong Kong Pavilion served hundreds of entrées, including "shark fin-stuffed dumplings". The venue recreated a Hong Kong dockside with reconstructions of ancient Chinese sailing boats and entertainment that included acrobats and Chinese opera singers. The restaurant at the Swiss pavilion served Swiss wines, cheese dishes like a hot cheese tart, cheese croquettes and cheese fondue and meat and sausage dishes. The desserts included chocolate mousse and chocolate cake, and a kirsch cake. Shish kebab were served at the Morocco pavilion, mezze platter and shwarama at the Lebanese pavilion, and nasi kuning at the Indonesian pavilion (the latter pavilion was seized and shut down during a political scuffle at the United Nations).

The Spanish Pavilion featured several restaurants offering traditional dishes from Spain. The Granada restaurant served Spanish ham, gazpacho, callos a la Madrileña and stuffed sweet peppers; paella was the most requested entrée. The Toledo restaurant had dishes like mushrooms with béchamel sauce, pâté with aspic, and sea bass en papillote. A New York Times article from 1964 wrote that they were "the most talked-about restaurants at the fair" and that getting a table could "at times seem a Herculean exercise". Sangria was introduced to the United States at the Spanish Pavilion.

The Seven-Up International Sandwich Garden offered fairgoers a buffet-style selection of 16 sandwiches influenced by international cuisines:

Sandwich Garden offerings
Region	Country	Bread	Filling
Northern Europe	England	Raisin bread	Cream cheese and currant jelly
Northern Europe	Germany	Pumpernickel	Wurst and spicy dressing
Northern Europe	Sweden	Limpa bread	Smoked salmon and chopped egg
Northern Europe	Scotland	Barley bread	Sliced lamb with mint dressing
The Pacific	The Philippines	Herb bread	Barbecued pork
The Pacific	Indonesia	Cinnamon swirl bread	Chicken-ginger-coconut
The Pacific	Hawaii	Coconut bread	Lomi-lomi salmon
The Pacific	Australia	Caraway rye bread	Sliced beef
Mediterranean	France	French bread	Liver pâté
Mediterranean	Morocco	Onion white bread	Sliced lamb with tart dressing
Mediterranean	Italy	Sesame bread	Provolone and prosciutto
Mediterranean	Spain	Poppyseed white bread	"Chicken Valencia"
Americas	Canada	Cheddar bread	Baked ham with pickle dressing
Americas	Argentina	Corn bread	Churrasco beef
Americas	United States	Whole wheat bread	Turkey and cranberry dressing
Americas	Alaska	Buttermilk bread	Salmon with lemon dressing

At $1.50 (around $12 in 2020) for a platter of four sandwiches, relish, cheese, and candy, and unlimited 7Up, the sandwich garden was one of the more economical dining options at the fair. The pavilion had a red and white clock tower with a visible 7Up logo, with covered open-air dining areas and live music. The menu advertised "the food specialties of 16 countries in elaborate sandwiches, plus all the Seven Up the customer can drink". Four sandwiches were offered from each of four regions: Northern Europe, the Pacific, the Mediterranean and the Americas. Each was served on a different oval-shaped bread described as "an innovation to the world of sandwich-making."

== Legacy ==
In 2019, the "World's Fare" was organized at Citi Field as an "homage to the great Fair of 1964". Over 100 food vendors participated at the event, which featured an international beer garden with over 65 craft brewers. The range of foods included dumplings, empanadas, burgers, fried ice cream, Belgian waffles and tacos.
