= Mala mogodu =

Southern African stew

Mala mogodu/Usu(in IsiZUlu)
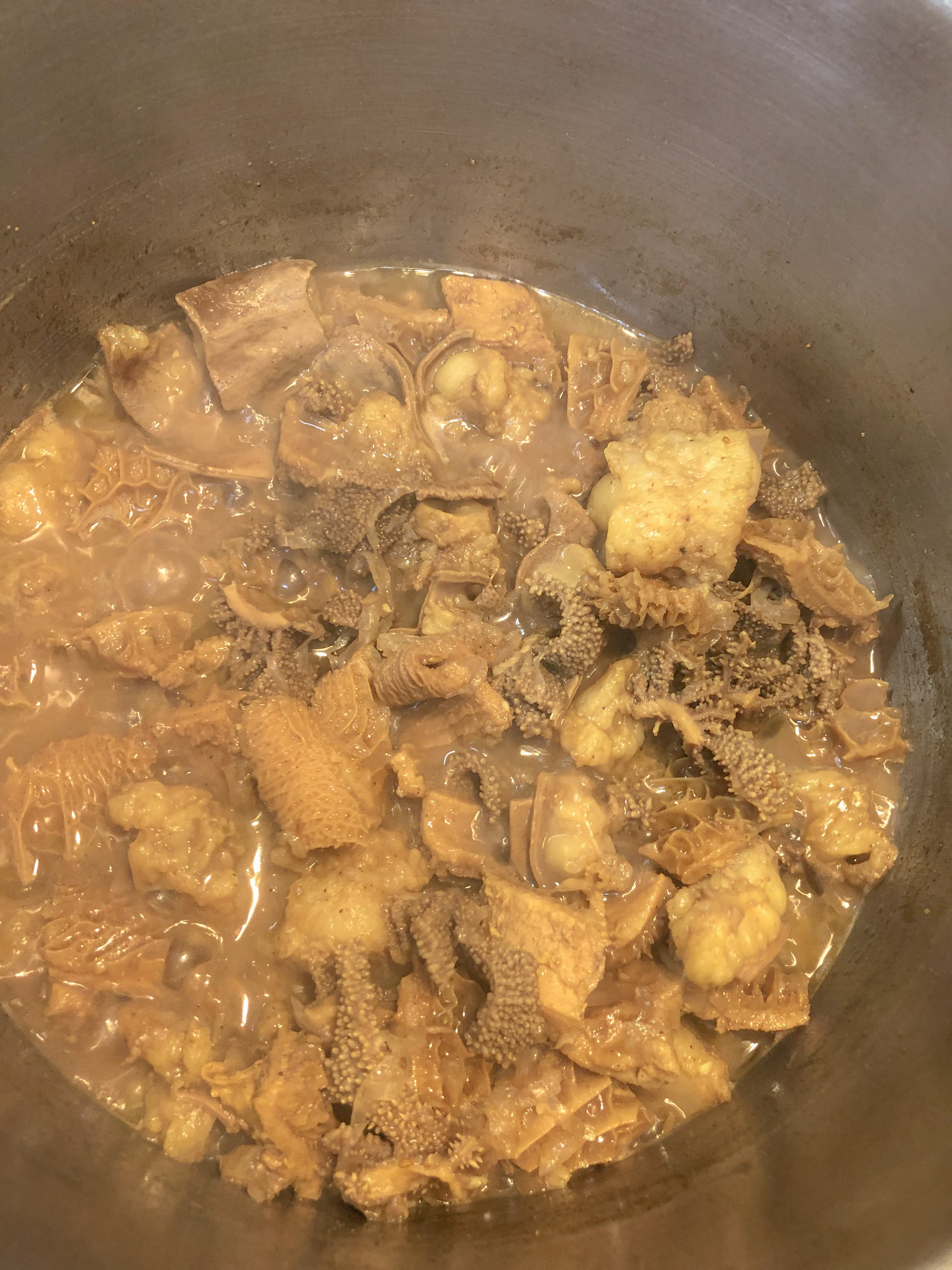
- Mala Mogodu/Usu
- Type: Stew
- Place of origin: Botswana, South Africa and Lesotho
- Main ingredients: tripe, intestines
- Food energy (per serving): 900 kcal (3,800 kJ)

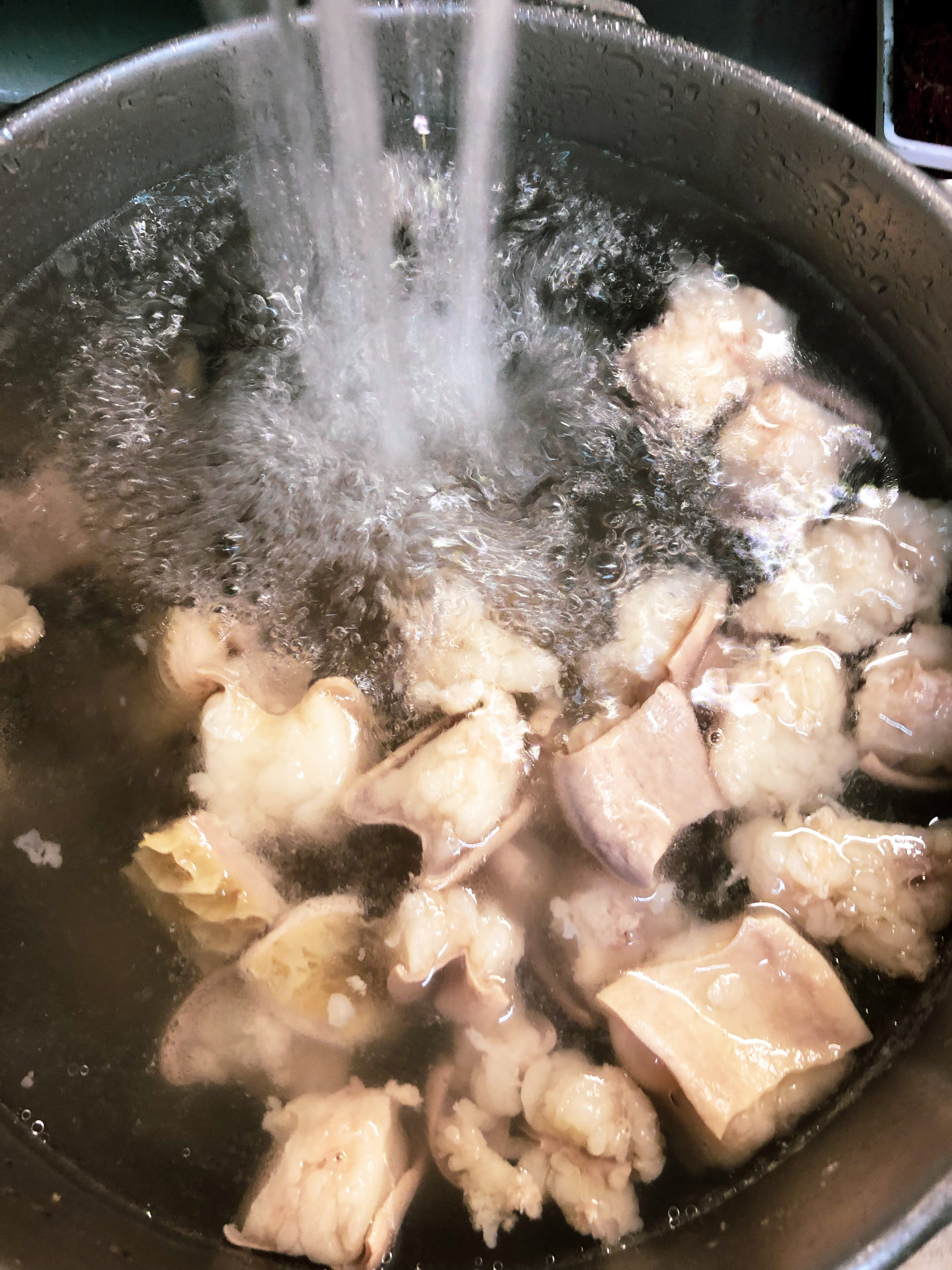
Washed and raw Mala Mogodu

Mala mogodu is a Southern African food. Mogodu is a combination of chopped serobe (tripe) and mala (intestines) served as a stew often with hot pap or dumpling. Mala (in Setswana/Sotho) is the insides, usually of a mammal such as a cow or sheep.

== See also ==
- List of porridges
