= Caldume =

Italian stew

Caldume (Italian) or quarumi (Sicilian) is a Sicilian dish of veal tripe stewed with vegetables, served as a street food in Palermo and Catania.

All parts of the tripe (rumen, omasum, abomasum) as well as the duodenum are stewed with carrots, parsley, tomato, and onion. It is served hot, with salt, pepper, oil, and lemon.

Vendors of quarumi, called "quarumaru", are often found in the public markets. You can find it, from morning to night, both in the local markets and at some stalls scattered throughout the city. A seller of quarumi is called quarumaru. One of the few "quarumari" is Zù Carmelo in Via Oreto Nuova in Palermo, but he has only been open in the afternoon until evening, for 45 years now.
