= Saure Kutteln =

Swabian dish

Saure Kutteln is a Swabian specialty food, popular in the Swabian part of Baden-Württemberg as well as in the Province of Hohenzollern and Baden. It is often eaten with bread or with home fries. It was known as an extremely economical dish, since tripes were sold at a lower price than other meat. Nowadays it is rather seen as a culinary experience than a daily dish.

Saure Kutteln means sour tripes. The dish consists of washed and blanched rumen. The rumen gets chopped into slices and then gets cooked in roux for about an hour. Traditional spices are bay laurel, juniper and pepper. The sour taste is achieved by adding vinegar and/or wine.

In Austria a similar dish is known as Flecksuppe (tripe soup).
