= Kersha =

Egyptian stew made from beef tripe

Kersha كرشة
- Place of origin: Egypt
- Main ingredients: Beef tripe, onion, garlic, tomato and various spices

Kersha (Egyptian Arabic: كرشة) is an Egyptian stew made from beef tripe, specifically the stomach lining of cattle.

== Preparation ==
The preparation of kersha begins with thoroughly cleaning the beef tripe to remove any impurities. The tripe is soaked in a mixture of water, vinegar, and salt to eliminate odors and ensure cleanliness. After soaking, the tripe is rinsed and briefly boiled to tenderize it. In a separate pot, chopped onions and garlic are sautéed in oil until golden. The cleaned and cut tripe is then added to the pot and sautéed until it begins to brown. Spices such as black pepper, cumin, and coriander are incorporated to enhance the flavor. Chopped tomatoes or tomato paste is added, along with water or broth, to create a rich sauce. The stew is simmered until the tripe becomes tender and absorbs the flavors of the sauce. Kersha is traditionally served hot, accompanied by rice or bread.

Variations of this dish may include the addition of chickpeas, which are cooked alongside the tripe to enhance the stew's texture and nutritional value. The seasonings can also be adjusted to personal preference, with some recipes incorporating chili flakes for added heat. Serving kersha with eish baladi or over a bed of rice is customary.

== See also ==
- Egyptian cuisine
- List of Middle Eastern dishes
- List of African dishes
