= Fuqi feipian =

Spicy Sichuan beef dish

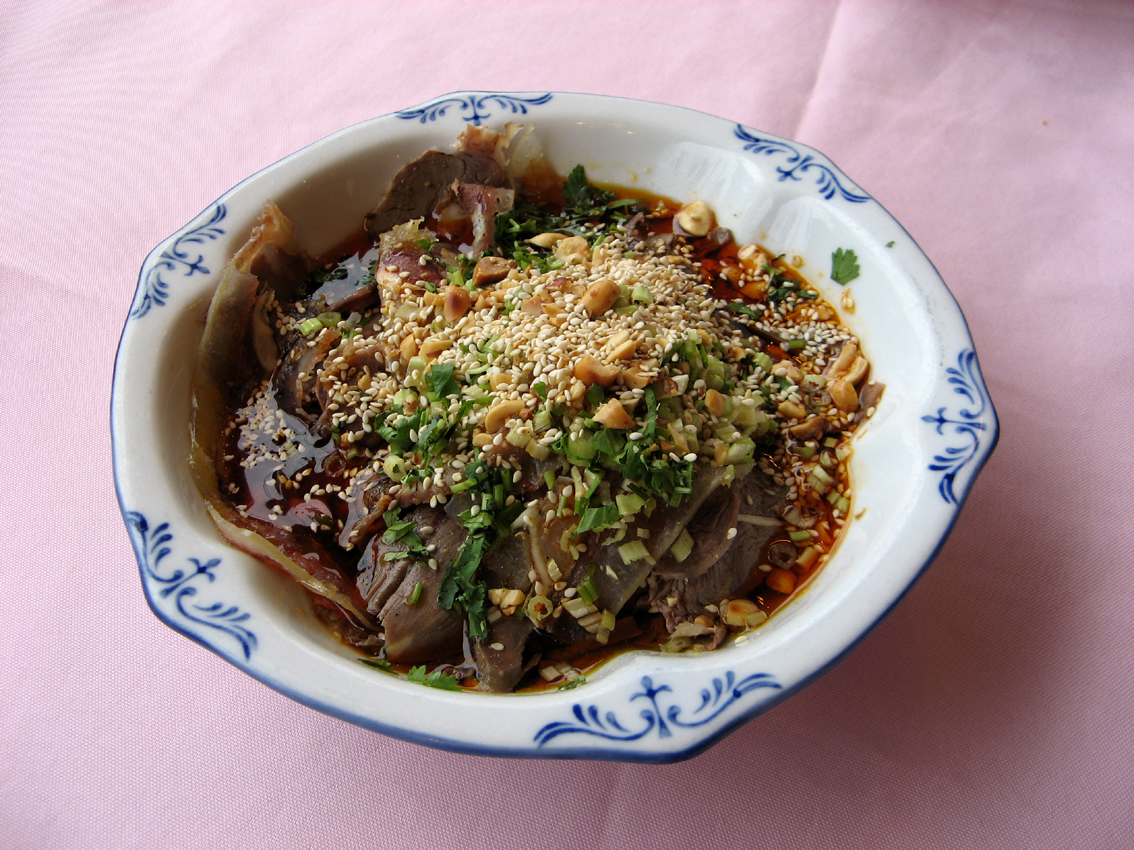
Fuqi feipian

Fuqi feipian (Chinese: 夫妻肺片; pinyin: fūqī fèipiàn; lit. 'husband and wife lung pieces') is a popular Sichuan dish, served cold or at room temperature, which is made of thinly sliced beef and beef offal. Common ingredients in the modern version include beef heart, tongue and tripe, and a generous amount of various spices, including Sichuan pepper. True to its Sichuan roots, the desired taste should be both spicy and mouth-numbing. Despite its name, actual lung is rarely used.

== History ==
As early as the late Qing dynasty, many vendors living in Chengdu were already selling beef slices served cold in the city's streets, using beef offal because they were relatively inexpensive. Because of its low cost, the dish was popular among rickshaw pullers and poor students.

In the 1930s, a married couple in Chengdu became famous for making beef slices. The husband, Guo Zhaohua (郭朝華), and wife, Zhang Tianzheng (張田政), were particular about the beef slices they made, and often experimented with new ingredients. As a result, their beef slices had a distinct taste from the other beef slice vendors, and their business boomed. Often though, mischievous children would pull a prank on the couple, and stick paper notes that read fuqi feipian ("husband and wife lung pieces") on their backs, and sometimes people would yell the words out. Later on, a merchant tried the fuqi feipian and was so satisfied, he gave them a gold-lettered plaque that read fuqi feipian, and the name has stuck ever since.

To suit their customers' tastes, the couple made many improvements on the dish, and offal slices were eventually replaced by various beef or lamb slices. Many people still preferred calling the dish fuqi feipian, thus the name is still used today.

The meaning of fei was originally waste parts or offal (廢) but later changed to lung (肺) so the dish sounded less repulsive. The lung could be a part of this offal, but fei is not lung by itself in this dish's meaning.
