= Poulette sauce =

Poulette sauce is a classic sauce of French cuisine. It is made with mushrooms and allemande sauce, then finished with Noilly Prat, lemon juice, butter and chopped parsley.

This sauce can be used for vegetables, but it is mainly served with sheep's feet.
