= Tripe =

Edible offal from the stomachs of various farm animals

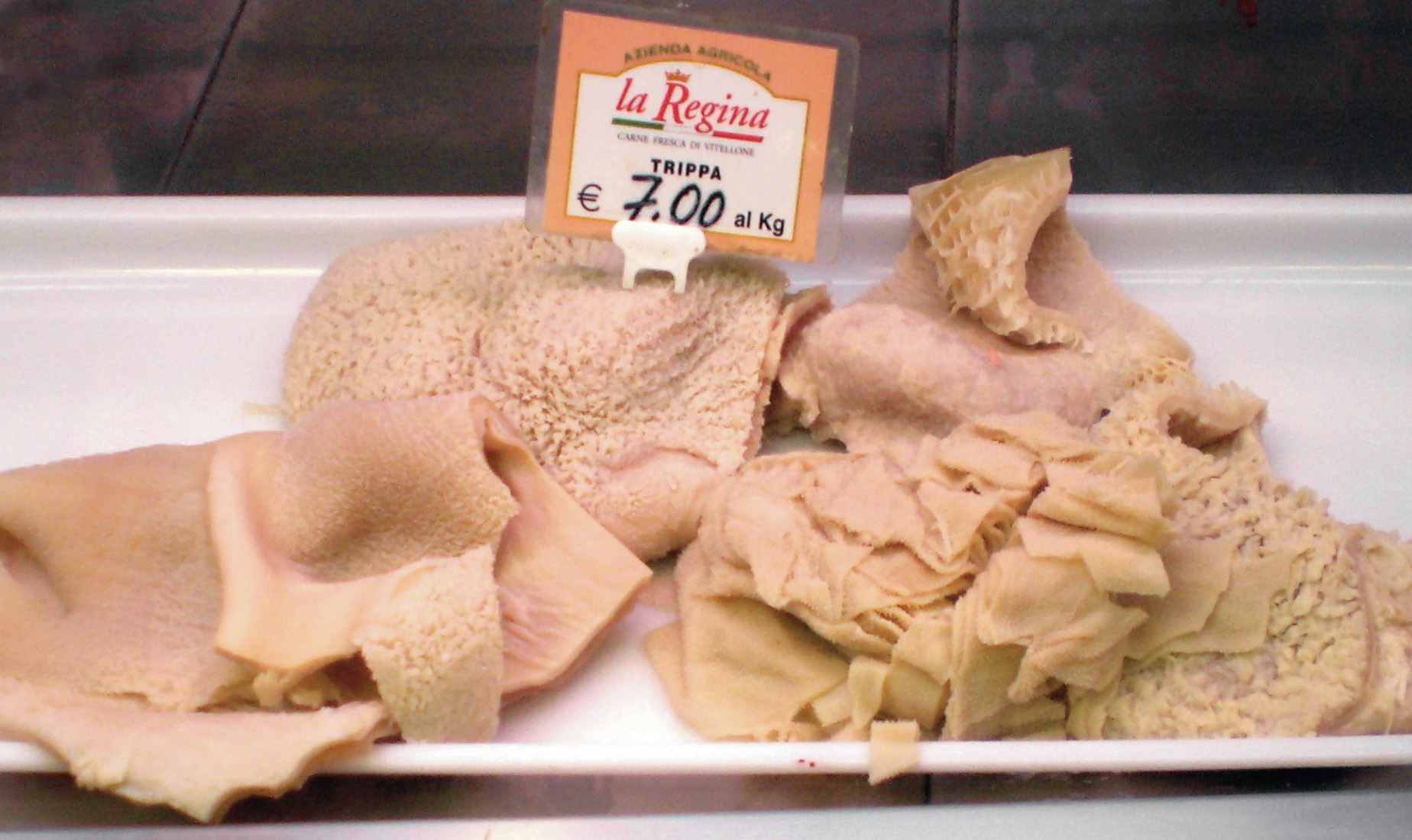
Tripe (trippa) in an Italian market

Tripe is the upper digestive system of ruminants prepared as edible offal. Most tripe is from cattle and sheep, but may come from other ruminants as well.

== Types ==
=== Beef ===
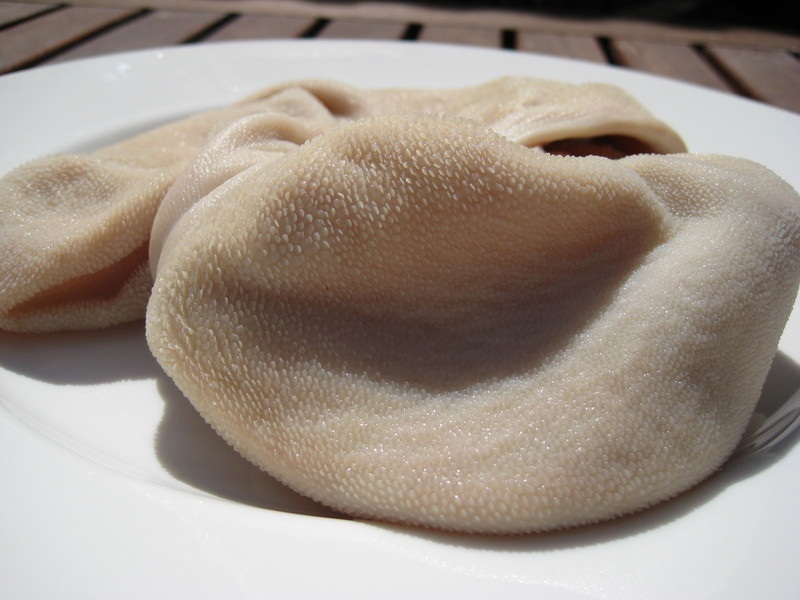
Rumen beef tripe, stomach chamber 1. Blanket/flat/smooth tripe.

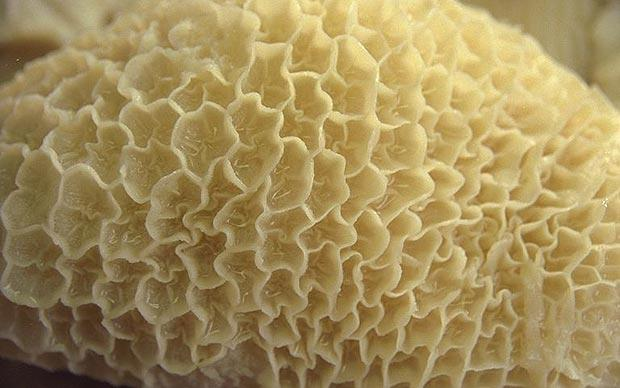
Reticulum beef tripe, stomach chamber 2. Honeycomb/pocket tripe.

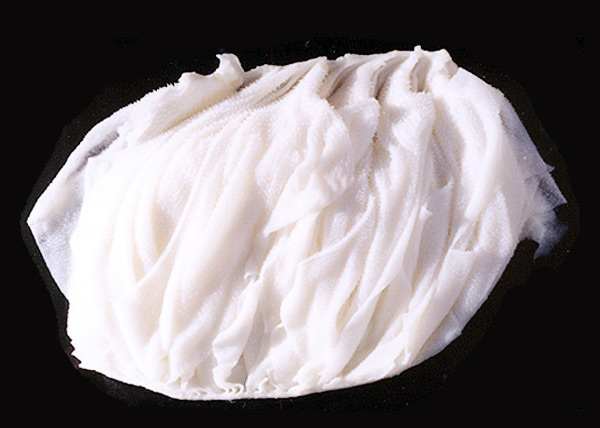
Omasum beef tripe, stomach chamber 3. Book/bible/leaf tripe.

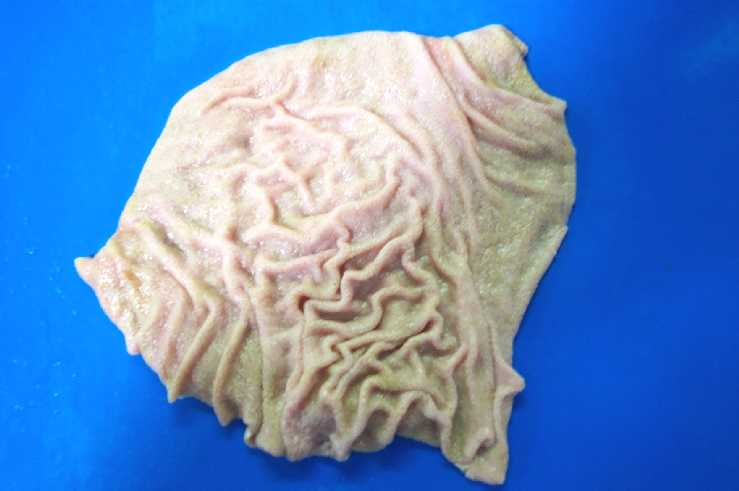
Abomasum beef tripe, stomach chamber 4. Reed tripe.

Beef tripe is made from the muscle wall (the interior mucosal lining is removed) of a cow's stomach chambers: the rumen (blanket/flat/smooth tripe), the reticulum (honeycomb/pocket tripe), and the omasum (book/bible/leaf tripe). Abomasum (reed tripe) is seen less frequently, owing to its glandular tissue content.

=== Other animals ===
Tripe refers to cow (beef) stomach, but includes stomach of any ruminant including cattle, sheep, deer, antelope, goat, ox, giraffes, and their relatives. Tripas, the related Spanish word, refers to culinary dishes produced from the small intestines of an animal. In some cases, other names have been applied to the tripe of other animals. For example, tripe from pigs may be referred to as paunch, pig bag, or hog maw.

=== Washed tripe ===
Tripe, raw
Nutritional value per 100 g (3.5 oz)
- Energy: 355 kJ (85 kcal)
- Carbohydrates: 0 g
- Sugars lactose: 0 g 0 g
- Dietary fibre: 0 g
- Fat: 3.69 g
- Saturated: 1.291 g
- Monounsaturated: 1.533 g
- Polyunsaturated: 0.180 g
- Protein: 12.07 g
Vitamins and minerals
Vitamins	Quantity %DV^{†}
Vitamin A equiv.	0% 0 μg
Thiamine (B1)	0% 0 mg
Riboflavin (B2)	5% 0.064 mg
Niacin (B3)	6% 0.881 mg
Pantothenic acid (B5)	2% 0.1 mg
Vitamin B6	1% 0.014 mg
Folate (B9)	1% 5 μg
Vitamin B12	58% 1.39 μg
Vitamin C	0% 0 mg
Vitamin D	0% 0 μg
Vitamin E	1% 0.09 mg
Vitamin K	0% 0 μg
Minerals	Quantity %DV^{†}
Calcium	5% 69 mg
Iron	3% 0.59 mg
Magnesium	3% 13 mg
Manganese	4% 0.085 mg
Phosphorus	5% 64 mg
Potassium	2% 67 mg
Sodium	4% 97 mg
Zinc	13% 1.42 mg
- Other constituents: Quantity
- Water: 84.16 g
- ^{†}Percentages estimated using US recommendations for adults, except for potassium, which is estimated based on expert recommendation from the National Academies.

Washed tripe is more typically known as dressed tripe. To dress the tripe, the stomachs are cleaned and the fat trimmed off. It is then boiled and bleached, giving it the white color more commonly associated with tripe as seen on market stalls and in butchers' shops. The task of dressing the tripe is usually carried out by a professional tripe dresser.

Dressed tripe was a popular, nutritious and cheap dish for the British working classes from Victorian times until the latter half of the 20th century. While it is still popular in many parts of the world today, the number of tripe eaters, and consequently the number of tripe dressers, in the UK has rapidly declined. Tripe has come to be regarded as a pet food, as the increased affluence of postwar Britain has reduced the appeal of this once staple food.

It remains a popular dish in many parts of continental Europe such as Portugal, Spain, France and Italy. In France, a very popular dish, sold in most supermarkets, is tripes à la mode de Caen. In Spain callos a la madrileña are served as tapas in many restaurants as well as in supermarkets. The most beloved and celebrated dish in the city of Porto and surrounding areas, in Portugal, is tripas à moda do Porto, a tripe stew made with white butter beans, carrots, paprika and chouriço. It is so loved that locals are called 'Tripeiros', in an homage to the 'tripa' (tripe).

== Dishes ==
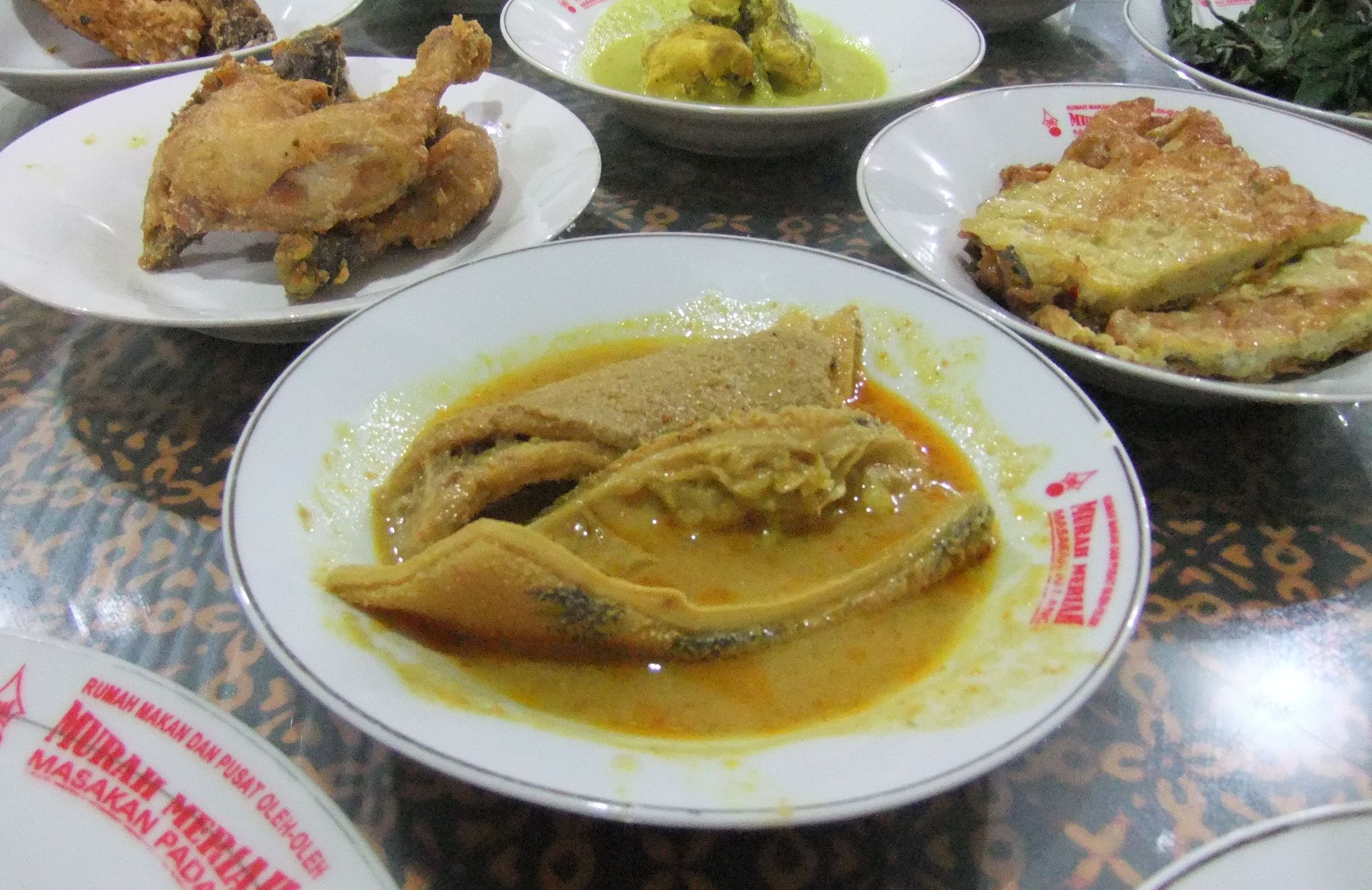
Gulai babat, tripe prepared in a type of curry

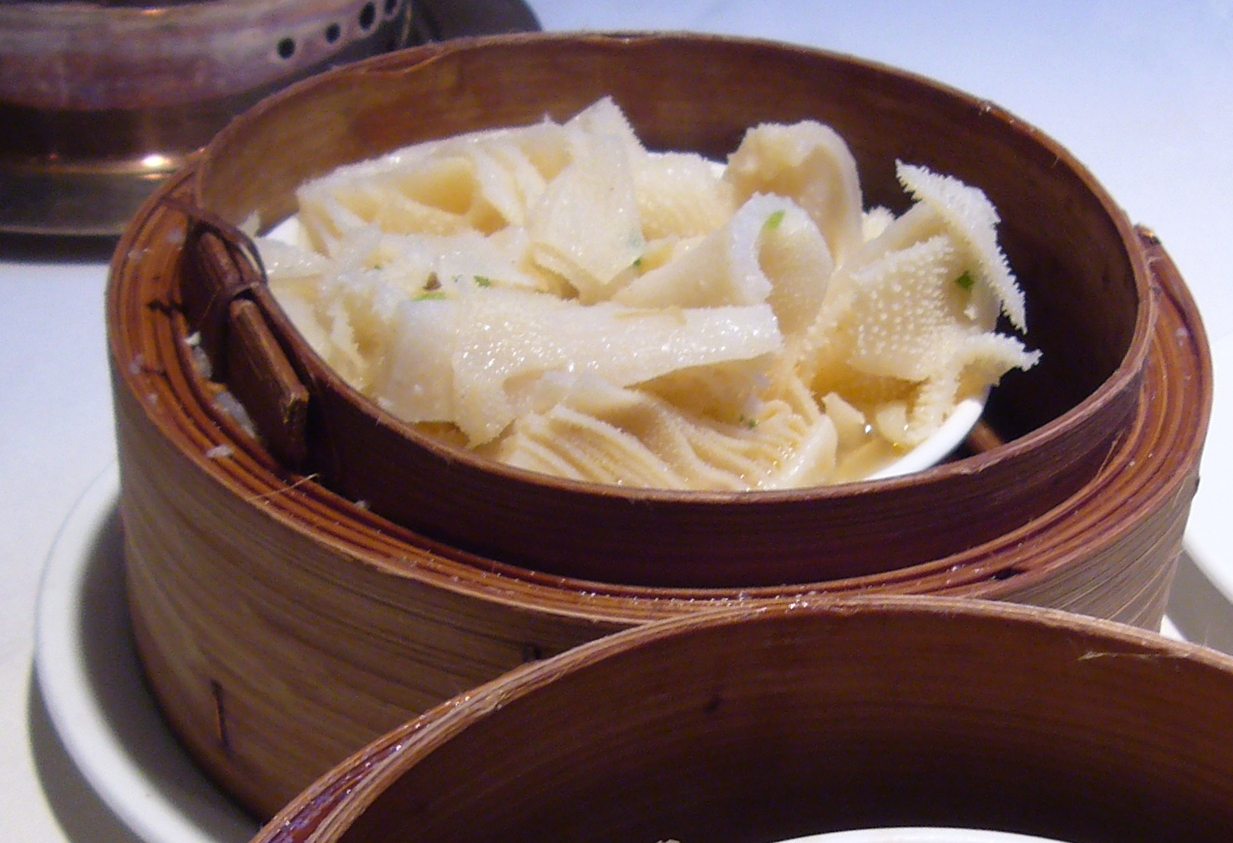
Steamed tripe prepared as dim sum

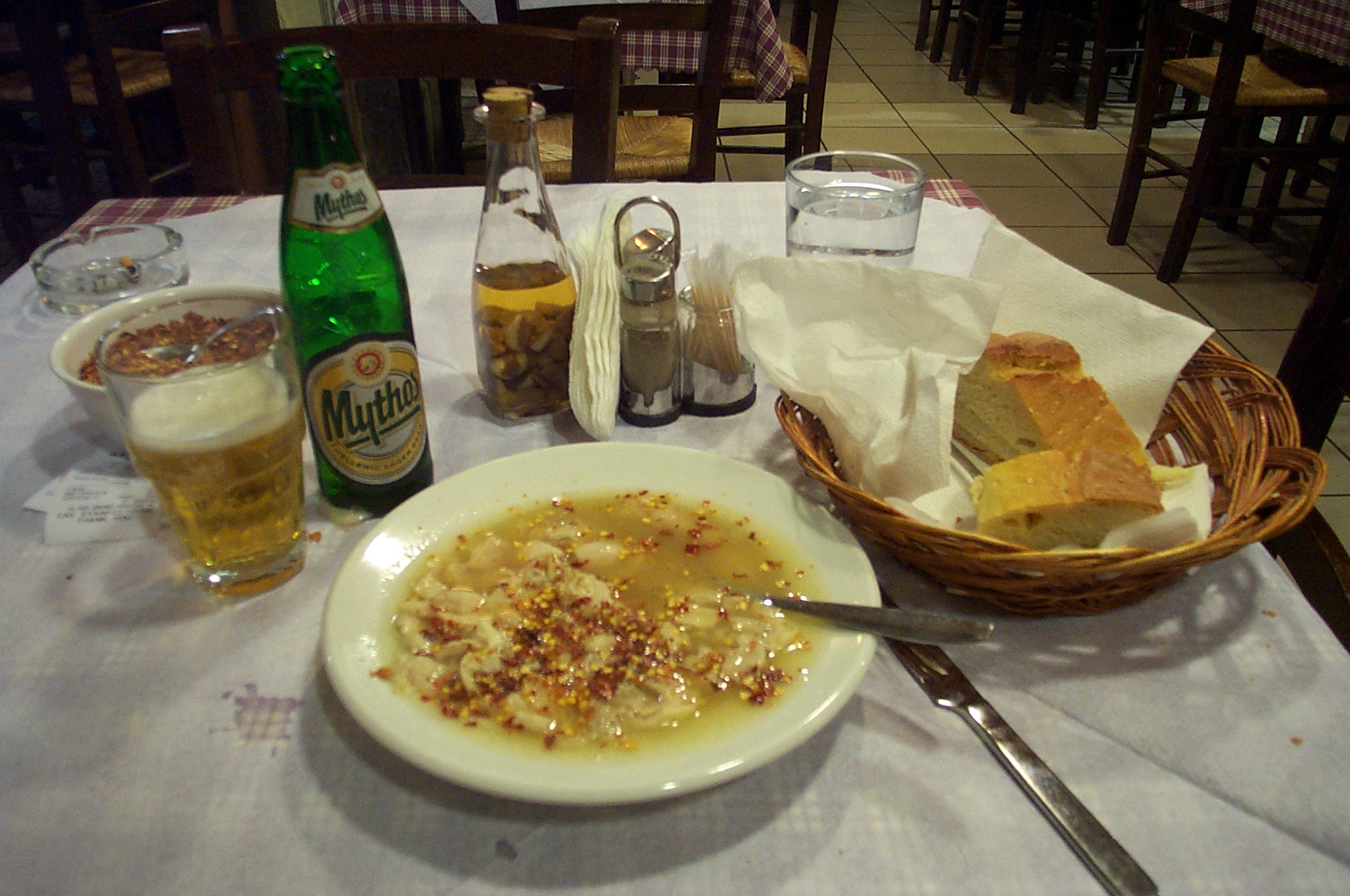
Patsás

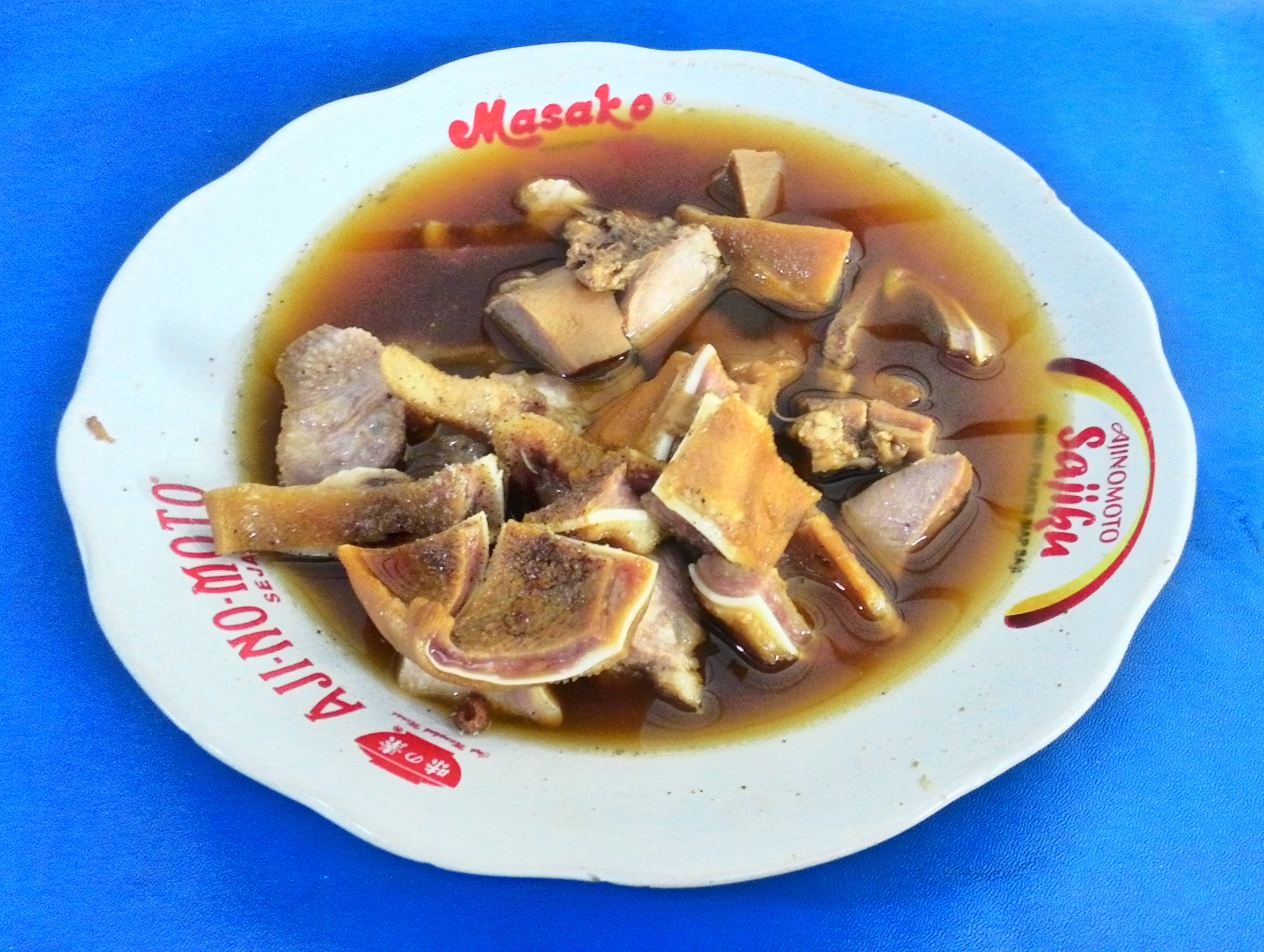
Sekba, pig offal in soy sauce stew

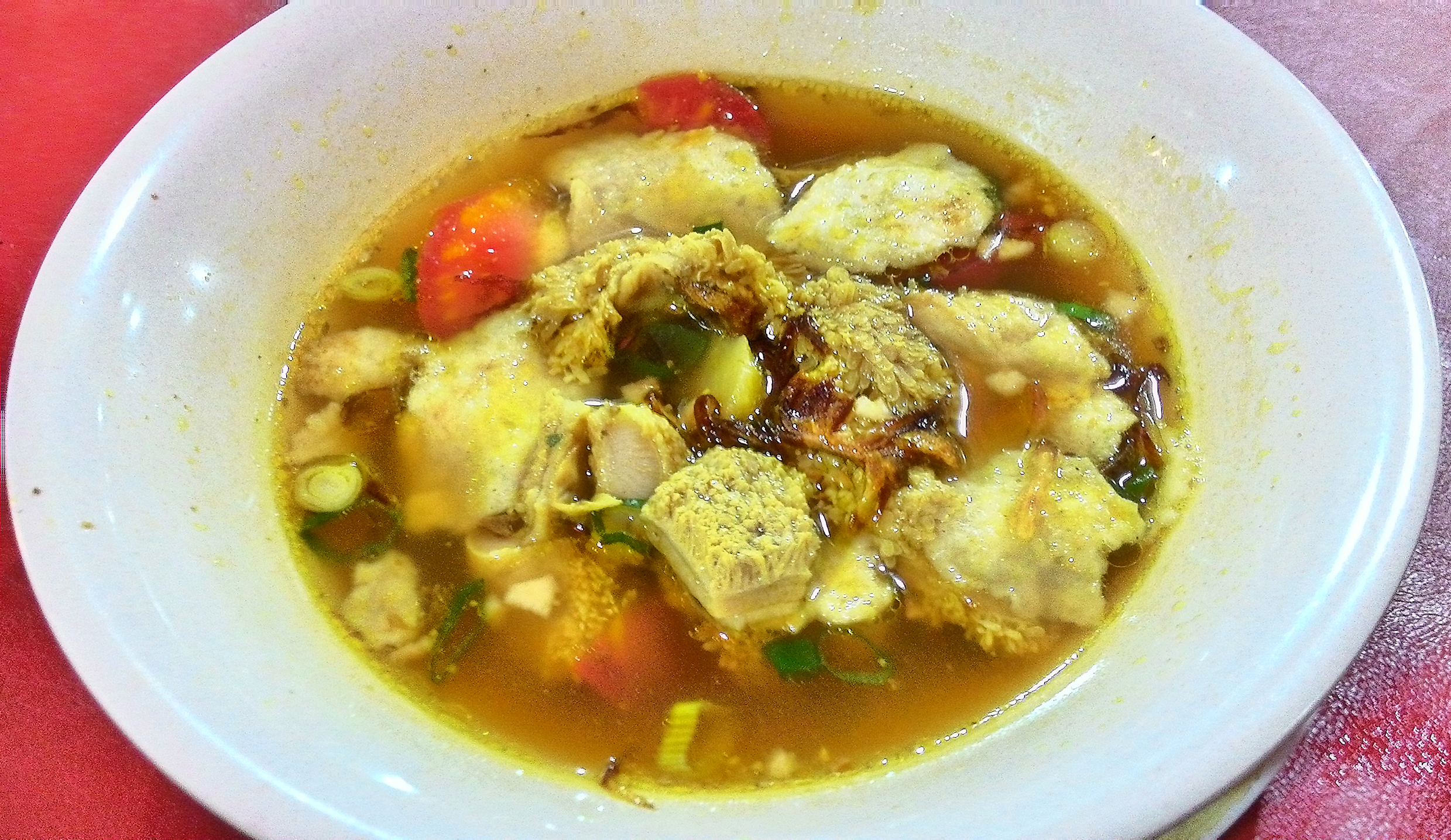
Soto babat, spicy tripe soup

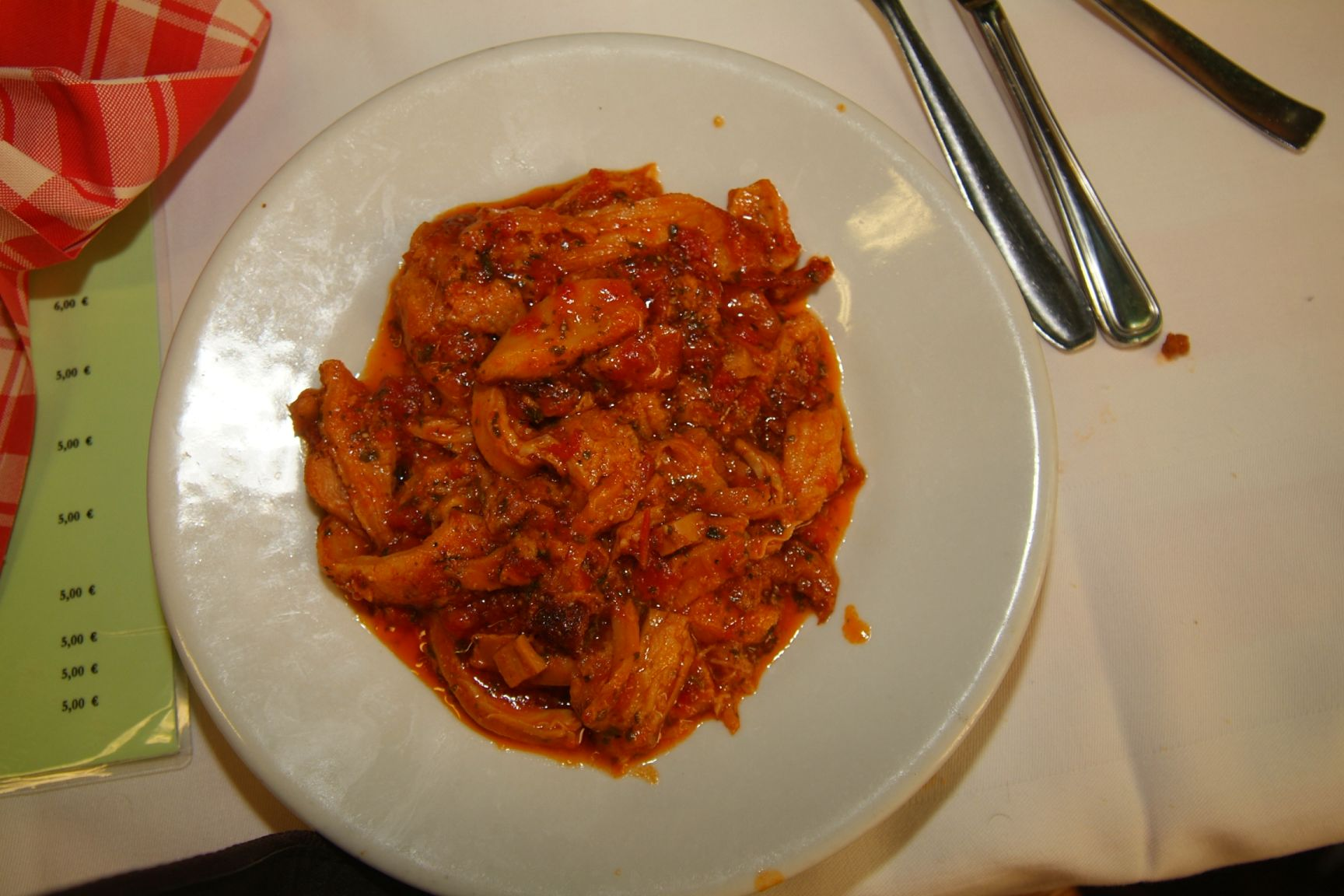
Trippa alla livornese

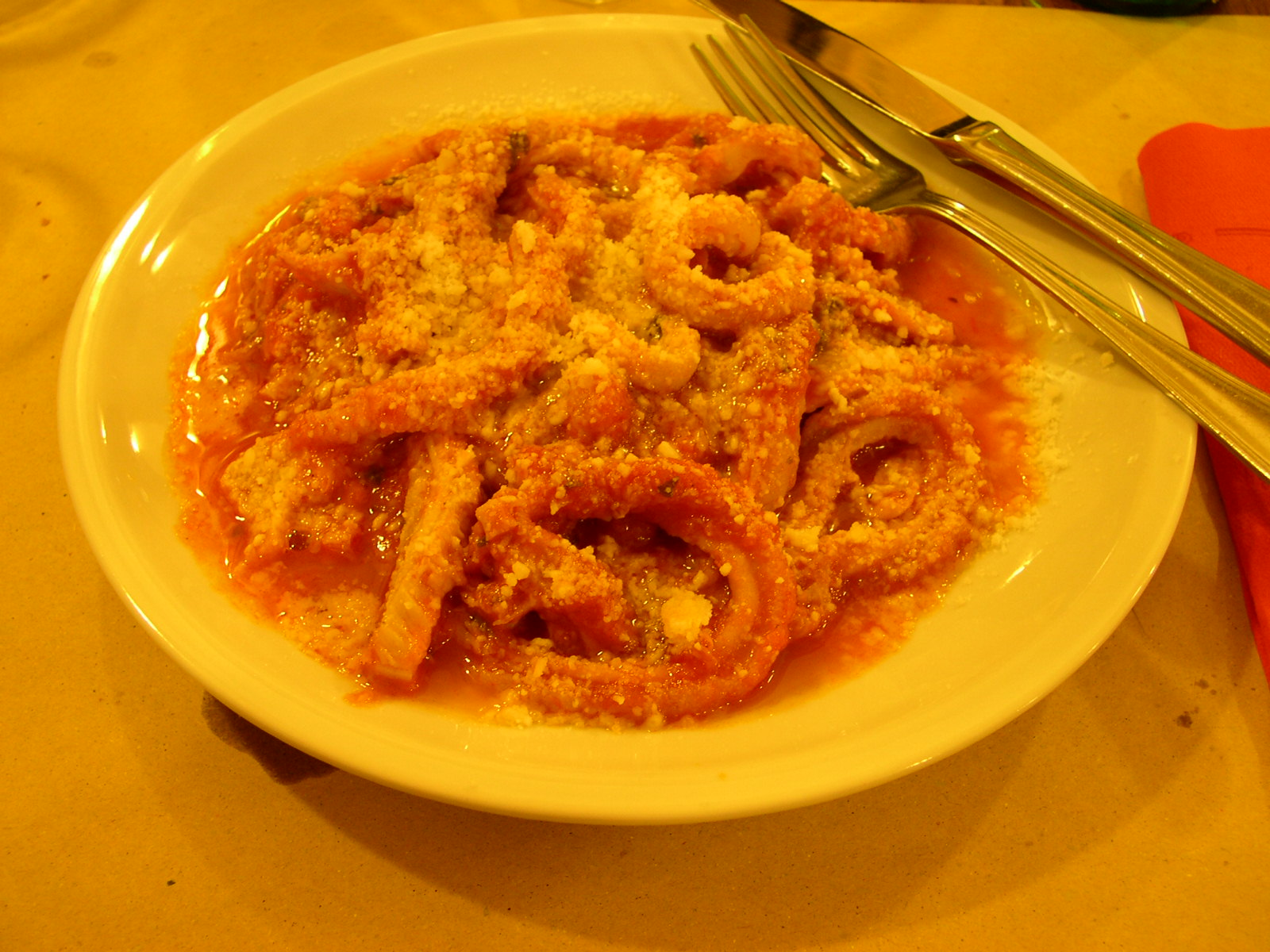
Trippa alla Romana

Tripe is eaten in many parts of the world. Tripe soup is made in many varieties in the Eastern European cuisine. Tripe dishes include:

- Andouille—French poached, boiled, and smoked cold tripe sausage.
- Andouillette—French grilling sausage, including beef tripe and pork.
- Babat—Indonesian spicy beef tripe dish; can be fried with spices or served as soup as soto babat (tripe soto).
- Bak kut teh—A Chinese herbal soup popularly served in Malaysia and Singapore with pork tripe, meat, and ribs.
- Bao du—Chinese quick-boiled beef or lamb tripe.
- Bhutan—Nepalese spicy stir fried dish of mixed tripe, intestines, and offal, often eaten as an appetizer or snack.
- Botifarra—Catalan sausage.
- Bumbar—Bosnian dish where the tripe is stuffed with other beef parts.
- Busecca/trippa alla milanese, in France, called gras-double a l'italienne A thick tripe soup with broth, pancetta, vegetables and beans; a well-known dish in Milanese cuisine.
- Caldume—A Sicilian stew or soup.
- Callos a la Madrileña—Spanish tripe dish cooked with chorizo and paprika.
- Callos con garbanzos—Spanish tripe dish cooked with chickpea, chorizo, and paprika.
- Calooley—tripe dish eaten in Somalia and Djibouti; it is a stew made with different sauces.
- Cap i pota—Catalan tripe dish.
- Cau-cau—Peruvian stew of cow tripe, potatoes, mint, and other spices and vegetables.
- Chakna—Indian spicy stew of goat tripe and other animal parts.
- Ciorbă de burtă—Romanian special soup with cream and garlic.
- Cow foot soup—Belizean dish of seasoned, tenderly cooked cow tripe and foot, plus aromatic and ground vegetables with macaroni in a rich glutinous soup.
- Cuajito—Puerto Rican dish made from pig stomach; eaten with boiled plantains.
- Dobrada—Portuguese tripe dish usually made with white butterbeans, carrots, and chouriço; served with white rice.
- Dršťkovka (dršťková polévka)—Czech goulash-like tripe soup.
- Fasulia bil karsha—Libyan kidney bean soup with tripe.
- Držková—Slovak tripe soup (držková polievka).
- Dulot or dulet—Eritrean and Ethiopian tripe and entrail stir-fry, containing finely chopped tripe, liver, and ground beef, lamb, or goat fried in clarified and spiced butter with garlic, parsley, and berbere.
- Ebyenda or byenda—Word for tripe in some Bantu languages of Uganda; tripe may be stewed, but is especially popular when cooked with matooke as a breakfast dish.
- Fileki or špek-fileki—Croatian tripe soup.
- Flaczki or flaki—Polish soup, with marjoram.
- Fuqi feipian or 夫妻肺片—Spicy and "numbing" (麻) Chinese cold dish made from various types of beef offal, nowadays mainly thinly sliced tendon, tripe, and sometimes tongue.
- Gopchang jeongol—A spicy Korean stew or casserole made by boiling beef tripe, vegetables, and seasonings in beef broth.
- Goto—Filipino gruel with tripe.
- Gras-double, the smooth tripe from the rumen, is cooked in multiple ways in French cuisine
- Guatitas—Ecuadorian and Chilean tripe stew, often served with peanut sauce in Ecuador.
- Guiso de panza—Bolivian tomato-based stewed tripe.
- Gulai babat—Indonesian Minang tripe curry.
- Guru—Zimbabwean name for tripe, normally eaten as relish with sadza.
- Haggis—Scottish traditional dish made of a sheep's stomach stuffed with oatmeal and the minced heart, liver, and lungs of a sheep. The stomach is used only as a vessel for the stuffing and is not eaten.
- İşkembe çorbası—Turkish tripe soup with garlic, lemon, and spices.
- Kare-kare—Filipino oxtail-peanut stew which may include tripe.
- Kersha (Egyptian Arabic: كرشة)—Egyptian tripe stew with chickpea and tomato sauce.
- Khash—In Armenia, this popular winter soup is made of boiled beef tendon and honeycomb tripe, and served with garlic and lavash bread.
- Kirxa—Popular traditional Maltese dish stewed in curry.
- Kista—Assyrian dish cooked traditionally in a stew and stuffed with soft rice; part of a major dish known as pacha in Assyrian.
- Lampredotto—Florentine abomasum-tripe dish, often eaten in sandwiches with green sauce and hot sauce.
- Laray—Curried tripe dish popular in Afghanistan and in the northern region of Pakistan; eaten with naan/roti.
- Laray—A Pakistani (Pushto) dish from the Northern Area, consisting of fried cow tripe with traditional spices. Da laray pikaorae is made of small square pieces of tripe mixed with chickpea flour (baisin) with traditional spices and deep-fried.
- Mala Mogodu—Popular South African tripe dish, often eaten at dinner time as a stew with hot pap.
- Matumbo—Kenyan tripe dish, often eaten as a stew with various accompaniments.
- Menudo—Mexican tripe and hominy stew.
- Mogodu—South African and Botswanan stewed tripe with fatty broth.
- Methmaaz—Kashmiri Kashmiri dry cooked tripe dish, heavily spiced with “meth”(dried fenugreek leaves). Usually cooked and served on special occasions as part of the famous “wazwan”.
- Mondongo—Latin American and Caribbean tripe, vegetable, and herb soup.
- Mondonguito a la italiana—An Italian-influenced Peruvian stew.
- Motsu—Japanese tripe served either simmered or in nabemono, such as motsunabe.
- Mumbar—Beef or sheep tripe stuffed with rice; typical dish in Adana in southern Turkey.
- Mutura—Kenyan tripe sausage; stuffed with blood, organ and other meat, and then roasted.
- Niubie (Chinese: 牛瘪)—A kind of Chinese huoguo, popular in Qiandongnan prefecture of Guizhou province, southwest China, and traditionally eaten by the Dong and Miao peoples; it includes the stomach and small intestine of cattle. Bile from the gall bladder and the half-digested contents of the stomach give the dish a unique, slightly bitter flavour. It can also be made with the offal of a goat, which is called yangbie (Chinese: 羊瘪).
- 牛肚 / 金錢肚 (Mandarin: niudu/jinqiandu; Cantonese, ngautou/gumtsintou)—Chinese tripe with the inner lining resembling an ancient Chinese coin with square hole (hence the name 'coin stomach'); usually served steamed with spring onion and garlic sauce, or boiled in water served with sweet soya sauce with chilli and spring onions as a dipping sauce.
- Obe ata pelu Shaaki—Nigerian stew made with large chunk of beef and goat tripe.
- Ojri—Pakistani traditional dish made of goat, cow, or sheep tripe. It is considered an offal delicacy and is often enjoyed by those who appreciate organ meats. Ojri is known for its deeply spiced flavor, labor-intensive preparation, cultural significance during Eid, and its status as both a homemade and street food favorite.
- Osben—Tunisian cow or sheep tripe filled with meat and vegetables, and generally cooked with couscous.
- Pacal—Hungarian spicy meal made of tripe, similar to pörkölt.
- Pacha —Iraqi cuisine; tripe and intestines stuffed with garlic, rice, and meat.
- Pachownie/Ojharie—Trinidad and Tobago cuisine; Guyanese Cuisine; Suriname cuisine; goat tripe cooked with curry and other ingredients.
- Packet and tripe—Irish meal with tripe boiled in water, then strained off and then simmered in a pot with milk, onions, salt, and pepper. It is served hot with cottage bread or bread rolls, and is popular in County Limerick.
- Pancita—Peruvian spicy barbecued fried food made with beef tripe marinated with peppers and other ingredients.
- Pancitas—Mexican stew similar to menudo.
- Pani câ meusa—A tripe sandwich popular in the Cuisine of Sicily.
- Papaitan—Filipino goat or beef tripe and offal soup flavored with bile.
- Patsás (Greek: πατσάς)—Greek tripe stew seasoned with red wine vinegar and garlic (skordostoubi) or thickened with avgolemono; widely believed to be a hangover remedy.
- Pens en Pootjies - The Afrikaaner version of Mogodu in South Africa.
- Pepper soup with tripe—Nigerian hot peppered liquid soup with bite-sized tripe.
- Philadelphia Pepper Pot soup—American (Pennsylvania) tripe soup with peppercorns.
- Phở—Vietnamese noodle soup with many regional variations, some of which include tripe.
- Pickled tripe—pickled white honeycomb tripe, once common in the Northeastern United States.
- Pieds paquets—Provençal dish, consisting of stuffed sheep's offal and sheep's feet stewed together.
- Potted meat
- Ṣakí or shaki—Word for tripe in the Yoruba language of Nigeria; ṣakí is often included in various stews, along with other meat.
- Sapu mhichā—leaf tripe bag stuffed with bone marrow then boiled and fried; from Kathmandu, Nepal.
- Satay babat—Marinated, skewered, and grilled tripe, eaten in the Malay world.
- Saure Kutteln—south German dish made with beef tripe and vinegar or wine.
- Sekba—Chinese Indonesian pork offals including tripes stewed in mild soy sauce-based soup.
- Serobe—A Botswanan delicacy, mixed with intestines and, on some occasions, with beef.
- Shkembe (shkembe chorba) (Шкембе чорба/Чкембе чорба in Bulgarian)—A kind of tripe soup prepared in Iran, Bulgaria, Romania, North Macedonia, Bosnia and Herzegovina, Serbia, and Turkey. Schkæm (Persian: شکم) is the Persian word for 'stomach'; sirabi (Persian: سیرابی) is the Iranian version of shkembe.
- Skembici—A Serbian dish and one of the oldest known dishes (dating from the 13th century). It is tripe in vegetable stew with herbs, served with boiled potato.
- Soto babat—Indonesian spicy tripe soup.
- Supu ya Utumbo—A popular traditional Tanzanian soup dish consisting of tripe and broth, often eaten with chillies and lime.
- Tablier de sapeur—A speciality of Lyon.
- Tkalia—A Moroccan spiced dish, simmered in sauce, and often accompanied with lung meat. Generally eaten with bread, especially during Eid al-Adha.
- Tripas à Moda do Porto—tripe with white beans in Portuguese cuisine; a dish typical of the city of Porto. It is called dobrada elsewhere in Portugal.
- Tripes à la mode de Caen—In Normandy, a traditional stew made with tripe. It has a very codified recipe, preserved by the brotherhood of La tripière d'or which organises a competition every year to elect the world's best maker of tripes à la mode de Caen.
- Tripe and beans—In Jamaica, a thick, spicy stew made with tripe and broad beans.
- Tripe and drisheen—In Cork, Ireland.
- Tripe and onions—In Northern England.
- Tripe in Nigerian tomato sauce—Tripe cooked until tender, and finished in spicy tomato sauce.
- Tripe soup—In Jordan, a stew made with tripe and tomato sauce.
- Tripe taco—Mexican sheep or calf tripe dish with tortillas.
- Tripice—A Croatian stew made from tripe boiled with potato, with bacon added for flavour.
- Tripoux—Occitan sheep tripe dish traditional in Rouergue.
- Trippa alla fiorentina—An Italian tripe dish fried with tomatoes and other vegetables.
- Trippa alla livornese
- Trippa alla pisana—A tripe dish from Pisa, Italy, containing onion, celery, carrot, garlic fried in oil, with tomatoes and pancetta or guanciale, and topped with Parmesan cheese.
- Trippa alla Ragusana—A traditional Sicilian tripe stew from town of Ragusa flavoured with almonds, nuts and cinnamon.
- Trippa alla romana—An Italian tripe dish made with white wine and tomatoes.
- Trippa alla savoiarda—A tripe dish from Piedmont, Italy, stewed with vegetables, white wine, and sauce from roasted beef; served covered with grated Parmigiano Reggiano/Grana Padano cheese.
- Trippe alla Veneta—A tripe dish from Veneto, Northeast Italy.
- Trippa di Moncalieri—A tripe dish from Moncalieri city, Piedmont, Italy, consisting of tripe sausage served in thin slices with a few drops of olive oil, minced parsley, garlic, and a pinch of black pepper, or used mainly for trippa alla Savoiarda.
- Tripe with potatoes—A tripe dish from Salento, Italy, consisting in tripe with tomatoes and potatoes
- Tsitsarong bulaklak—Filipino crunchy fried tripe (literally 'flower' crackling).
- Tuslama (Romanian)/Tuzlama (Turkish)—tripe stew specific to south-eastern Romania; a blend of Romanian and Turkish cuisines.
- Ulusu—A tripe dish from the Matebeleland region of Zimbabwe usually eaten with Isitshwala
- Vajri khudi—East Indian traditional variation of a vajri curry.
- Vampi—Slovenian tripe stew.
- Vette darmen—A traditional West Flemish dish, now on the verge of being obsolete; the tripe is seasoned and fried in a buttered pan.
- Yakiniku and horumonyaki—Japanese chargrilled, bite-sized tripe.
- Yem-adi—A Ghananian dish consisting of spiced and steamed tripe eaten with most stews (kontombire) and soups (light soup, peanut butter soup, palm kernel soup, ayoyo).

== Related dishes ==
In Spanish- and Portuguese-speaking countries, the close cognate tripas tends to denote small intestines rather than stomach lining. Dishes of this sort include:

- Tacos de tripa—Mesoamerican tacos filled with soft or crunchy fried small intestines

Another type of food made from the small intestines are chitterlings (chitlins).

Beef tripe is also a common meat in Kerala, India. Beef tripe and tapioca (kolliyum bottiyum) is a traditional wedding eve dinner for Christians in some parts of Kerala.

== Marketing ==
The Tripe Marketing Board promotes World Tripe Day on 24 October, because on that day in 1662, Samuel Pepys wrote, "So home and dined there with my wife upon a most excellent dish of tripes of my own directing."

== See also ==
- Chitterlings
- Gras-double—Another cut from beef or ox stomachs
