= Callos =

Spanish beef tripe and sausage stew

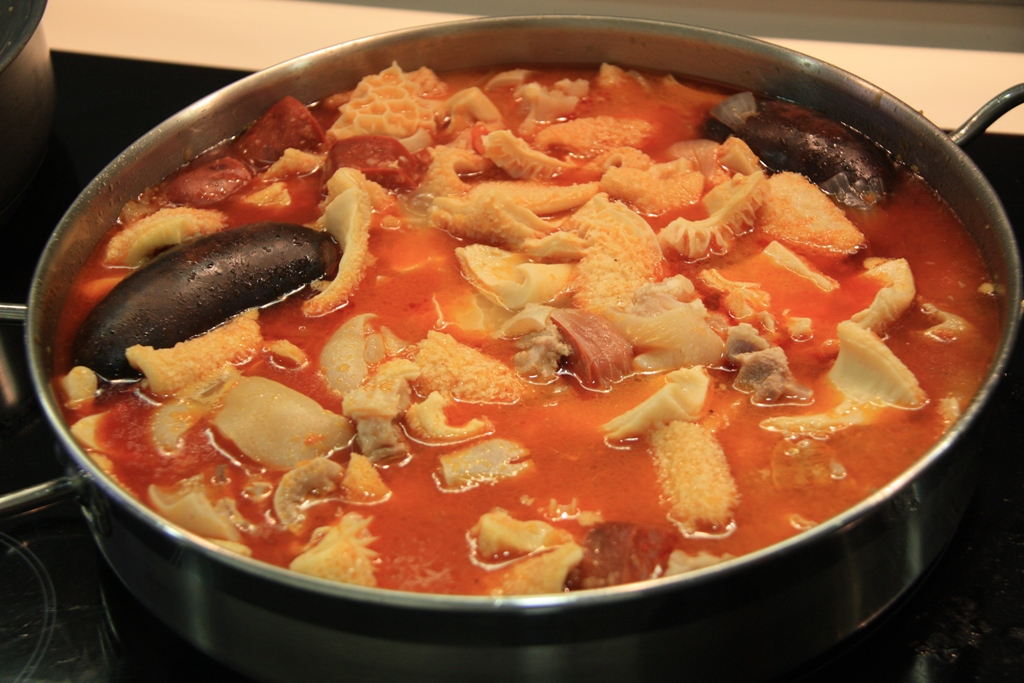
- Type: Stew
- Place of origin: Spain
- Main ingredients: Beef tripe, chickpeas, chorizo, peppers

Callos is a stew common across Spain, and is considered traditional to Madrid. It is also a traditional dish in the Philippines, usually cooked during special occasions, with a slight variations in ingredients such as adding potatoes, and carrots in the stew. In Madrid, it is referred to as callos a la madrileña.

It contains beef tripe and chickpeas, blood sausage and peppers. Chorizo sausage may also be used. Another simple recipe of callos is boiling the tripe until tender, slicing it into strips and cooking it in pork and beans with peppers. It is common to add cheese to it to enhance the flavour.

== See also ==
- Cocido
- List of legume dishes
- List of stews
