= Allemande sauce =

Sauce used in classic French cuisine

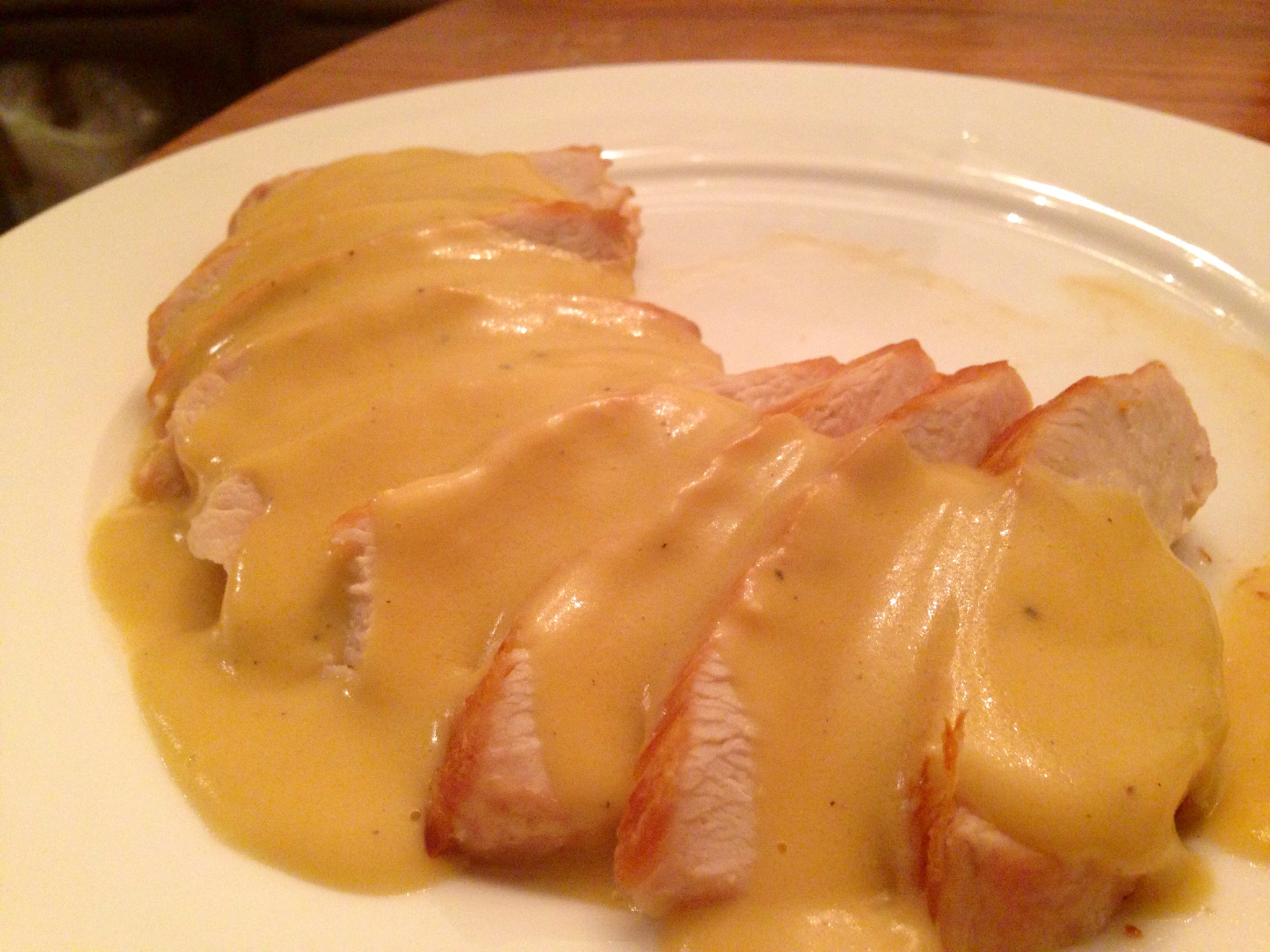
Chicken with allemande sauce

Allemande sauce or sauce parisienne is a sauce in French cuisine based on a light-colored velouté sauce (typically veal; chicken and shellfish veloutés can also be used), but thickened with egg yolks and heavy cream, and seasoned with lemon juice. Allemande was one of the four mother sauces of classic French cuisine as defined by Antoine Carême in The Art of French Cooking in the 19th Century.

Escoffier perfected the sauce allemande ('German sauce') in the early 20th century. At the outbreak of World War I, he renamed it sauce parisienne. Some American cookbooks define a completely different sauce parisienne consisting of cream cheese whipped together with oil and citrus juices, which they also call "cream cheese mayonnaise".
