= Tripes à la mode de Caen =

Traditional dish in Normandy cuisine

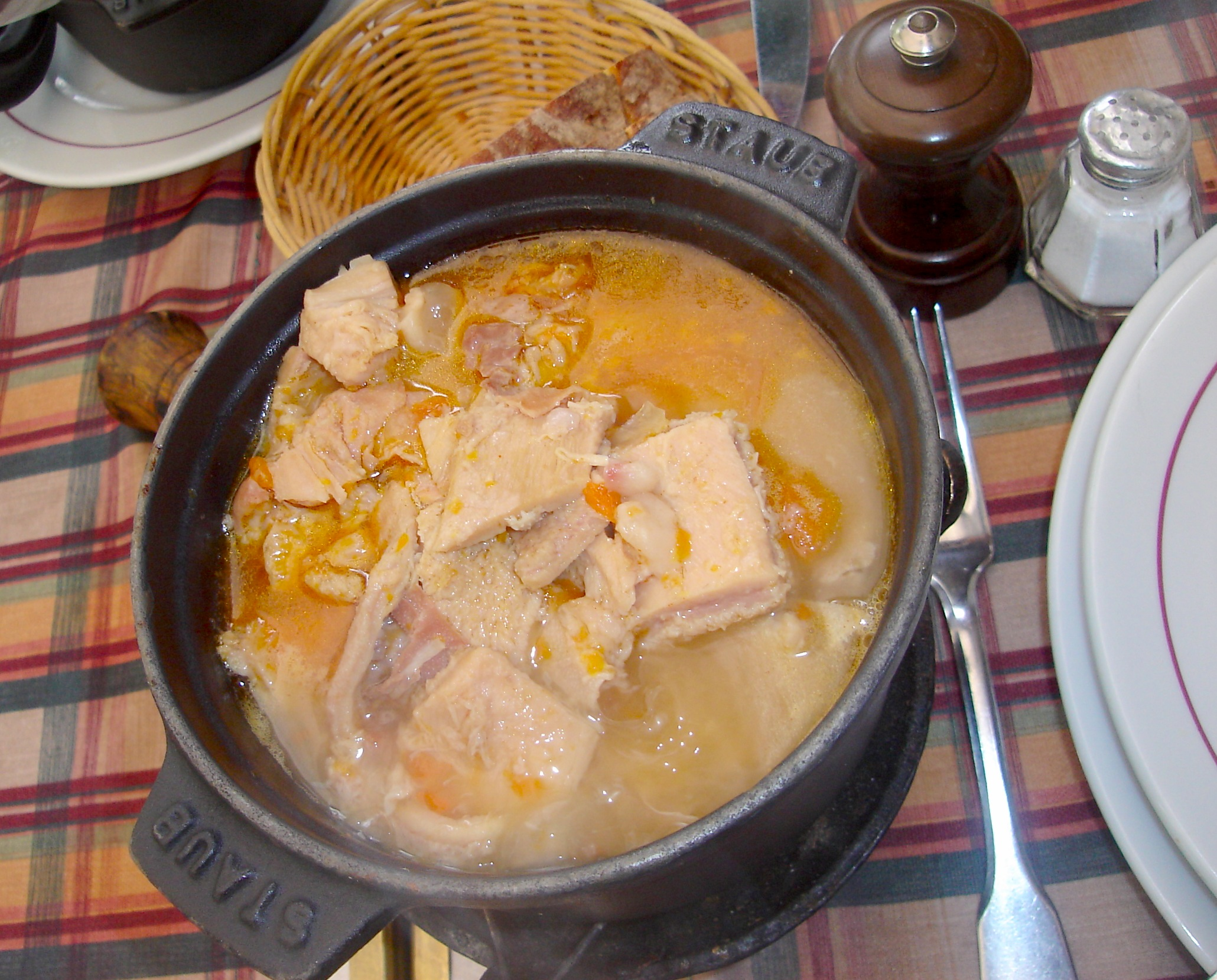
Tripes à la mode de Caen

Tripes à la mode de Caen is a traditional dish of the cuisine of Normandy, France.

In its original form this dish consisted of all four chambers of a beef cattle's stomach, part of the large intestine (this was outlawed in France in 1996), plus the hooves and bones, cut up and placed on a bed of carrots, onions, leeks, garlic, cloves, peppercorns, a bouquet garni, a bottle of cider and a glass of calvados in a tripière (a special earthenware pot for cooking tripe). Some sources include a large quantity of blanched beef fat. This was covered and hermetically sealed with dough and simmered in the oven for fifteen hours. The hooves, bones and bouquet garni are removed before serving with a sprinkling of some more cider.

Although this dish is prepared in Normandy throughout the year, locals believe that the dish is best in Autumn when the apple trees are bearing. Some of the fruit falls to the ground and is eaten by the cattle, along with the rich grasses of the season, imparting a distinctive flavour to the animal.

Sidoine Benoît was a Benedictine monk of the 14th Century at the Abbaye-aux-Hommes in Caen, in the Calvados département in the Normandy region of France. Local legend credits him with inventing the dish.

It was the use of cider and apple brandy in food that was Benoît's inspiration and contribution to French cuisine, making the insipid tripe dishes of the monks palatable.

Legend has it that William the Conqueror, Normandy's most famous notable, enjoyed a precursor of this dish, tripe sprinkled with apple juice.

The dish has a very codified recipe, preserved by the guild of "La tripière d'or" that organises a competition every year to elect the world's best tripes à la mode de Caen maker.

== See also ==
- Tripe soup
