= Sopa de mondongo =

Spanish-origin dish

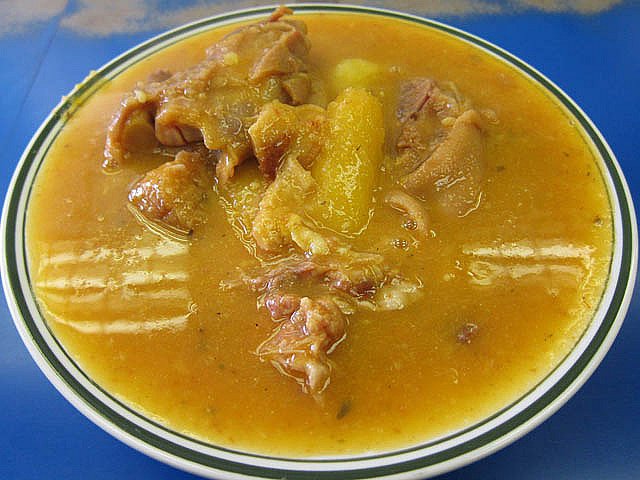
- Puerto Rican-style sopa de mondongo
- Type: Soup
- Region or state: Latin America, the Caribbean, Maritime Southeast Asia
- Main ingredients: Tripe, vegetables (bell peppers, onions, carrots, cabbage, celery, tomatoes) or root vegetables, cilantro (coriander), garlic

Sopa de mondongo is a soup that originally came from Latin America. It is made from diced tripe (the stomach of a cow or pig) slow-cooked with vegetables such as bell peppers, onions, carrots, cabbage, celery, tomatoes, cilantro, garlic or root vegetables. The dish is generally prepared in former Spanish colonies in Latin America, Caribbean and in the Philippines.

== Variations ==
Many variations of sopa de mondongo exist in Latin America, the Philippines and the Caribbean. Some add rice or maize late in the process. Bone marrow or hoof jelly may be used. The tripe may be soaked in citrus juice or a paste of sodium bicarbonate before cooking. The vegetables and spices used vary with availability.

In Argentina, it is also referred to as mondongo.

In the Dominican Republic, sopa de mondongo is popular and easy to come by in restaurants as one of its most popular dishes on the island. Beef tripe is typically washed in lime or lemon. Onions, garlic, bell peppers, tomatoes, carrots and celery are cooked in vegetable oil before boiling. Tripe is then added with potatoes and seasoned with salt, pepper, and lippia micromera (locally known as Dominican orégano). Another version is mondongo guisado. This is a thicker version that uses tomato paste instead of fresh tomatoes and also adding plantains, squash, olives, capers, green bananas, and replacing potatoes with cassava. Both soups are served with chopped cilantro, avocado, rice and hot sauce made with garlic, Dominican orégano, and chilies fermented in bitter orange juice called agrio de naranja.
