= Slovak cuisine =

Culinary traditions of Slovakia

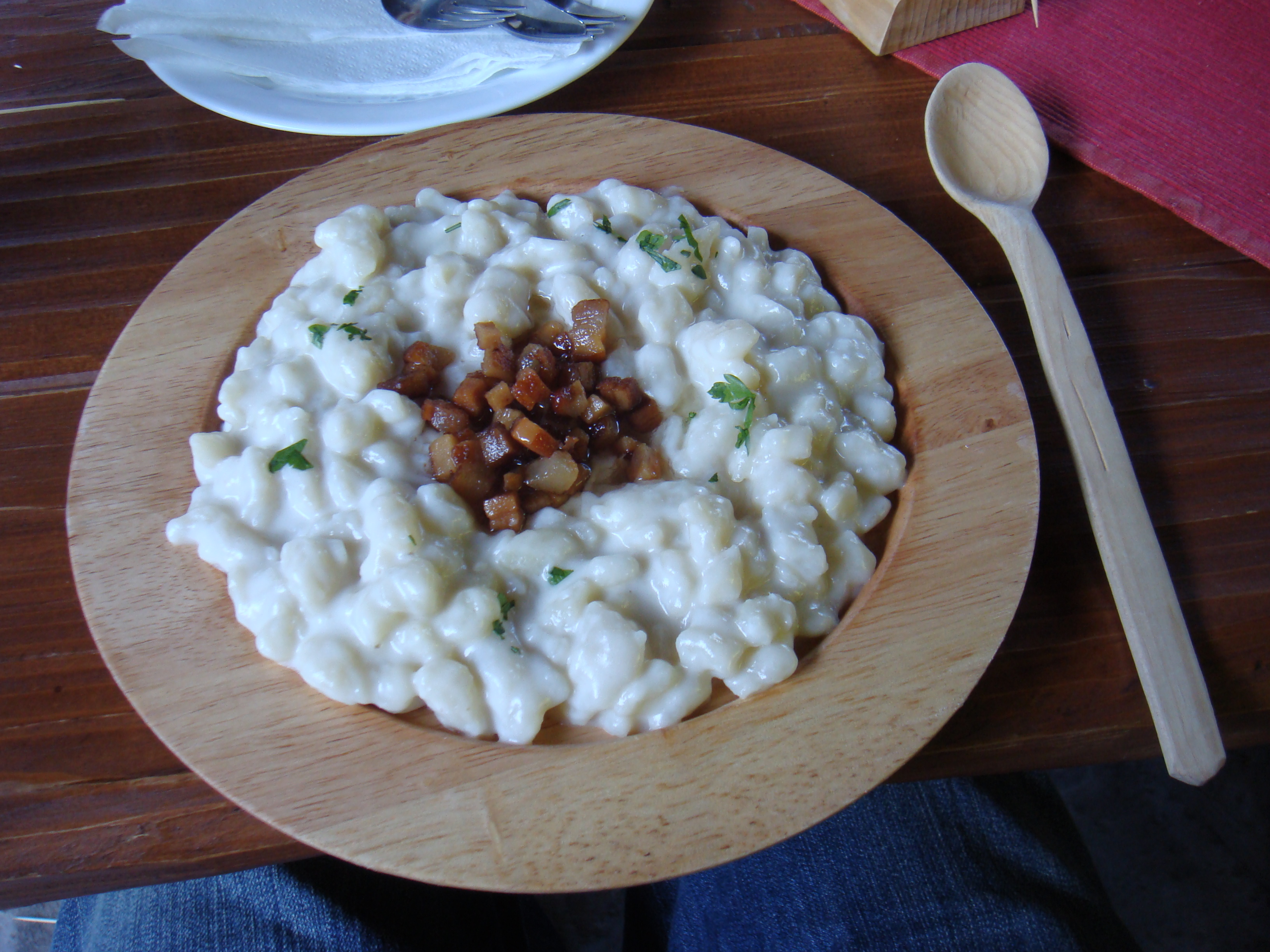
Bryndzové halušky (potato dumplings with sheep's-milk cheese)

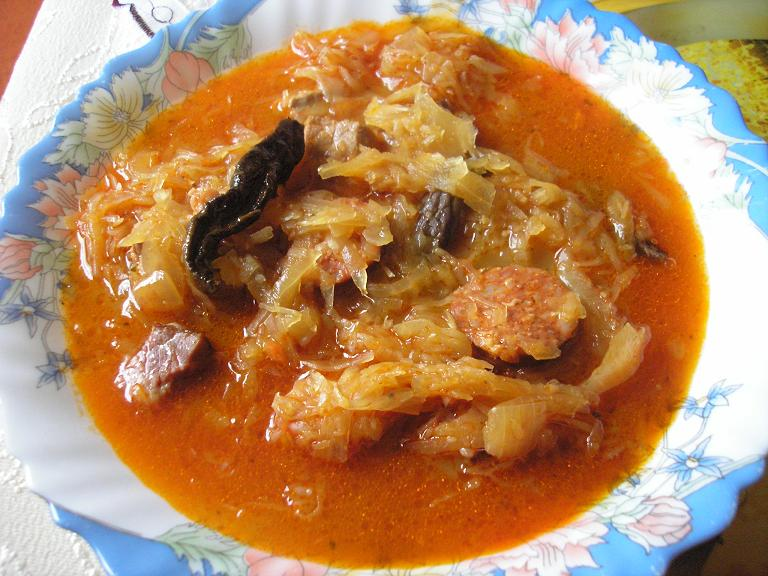
Kapustnica (soup made from sauerkraut and sausage)

Slovak cuisine varies slightly from region to region across Slovakia. It was influenced by the traditional cuisine of its neighbours and it influenced them as well. The origins of traditional Slovak cuisine can be traced to times when the majority of the population lived self-sufficiently in villages, with very limited food imports and exports and with no modern means of food preservation or processing.

This gave rise to a cuisine heavily dependent on a number of staple foods that could stand the hot summers and cold winters. These included wheat, potatoes, milk and milk products, pork, sauerkraut and onion. To a lesser degree beef, poultry, lamb and goat, eggs, a few other local vegetables, fruit and wild mushrooms were traditionally eaten.

All these were usually produced and processed by families themselves with some local trade at the country markets. Wheat was ground, and bread, dumplings and noodles were made from it. Potatoes were mostly boiled or processed into potato dough. Milk was processed into a wide range of products such as butter, cream, sour cream, buttermilk, and various types of cheese etc.

Typical pork products include sausages, smoked bacon, and lard. Spices were not widely used, and animal fats and butter were used instead of cooking oils. Main beverages included fresh and sour milk, and beer. Contemporary Slovak cuisine is widely influenced by various world cuisines and uses many different ingredients, spices and industrially processed foods.

== Slovak dishes ==
- Halušky
  - Bryndzové halušky: potato dumplings with bryndza (a sheep's milk cheese)
  - Strapačky: potato dumplings with sauerkraut
- Goose or duck feast (husacie or kačacie hody): festive menu consisting of roasted goose (husacina or husacie mäso) or duck meat (kačacie mäso), goose liver (husacia pečienka), greasy lokše, stewed red cabbage, and sour cherry and poppy seed strudel (štrúdľa), traditional food of Slovenský Grob.
  - Lokše: pancakes made of potato dough baked directly on the stove
- Bryndzové pirohy: Pierogi with bryndza filling
- Široké rezance s tvarohom a slaninou or simply tvarohové rezance: tagliatelle with quark (farmer's cheese) and fried bacon
- Zemiakové placky: potato pancakes fried in oil, also called haruľa in the Horehronie, Pohronie, and Kysuce regions and baba or babka in the Orava region
- Granadírsky pochod or granadír, also known as granadírmarš, grenadírmarš or grenadiersky pochod
- Kuracie prsia s broskyňou: chicken breast slices with ham and peach baked with cheese on the top
- Džatky: small balls made of mashed potatoes and flour, often served with bacon, typical Spiš dish
- Segedínsky guláš (Szeged goulash): pork stew with sauerkraut and cream or sour cream, usually served with steamed dumpling slices (knedľa)
- Rezeň: schnitzel, usually breaded
- Vyprážaný syr: fried cheese
- Držková polievka
- Vianočný kapor: christmas carp
- Sekaná: meatloaf
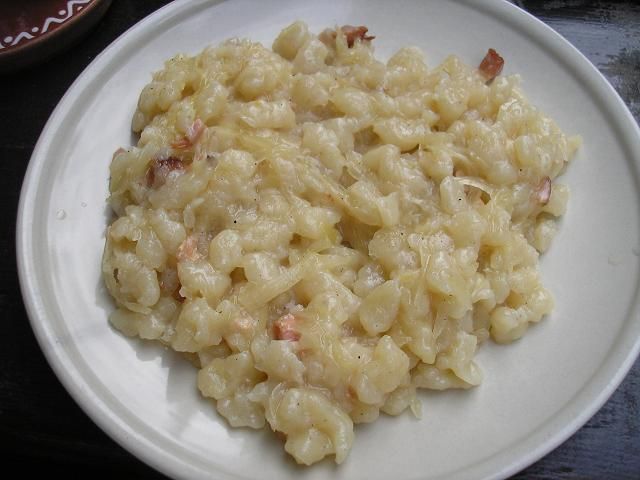
Strapačky (potato dumplings with sauerkraut)

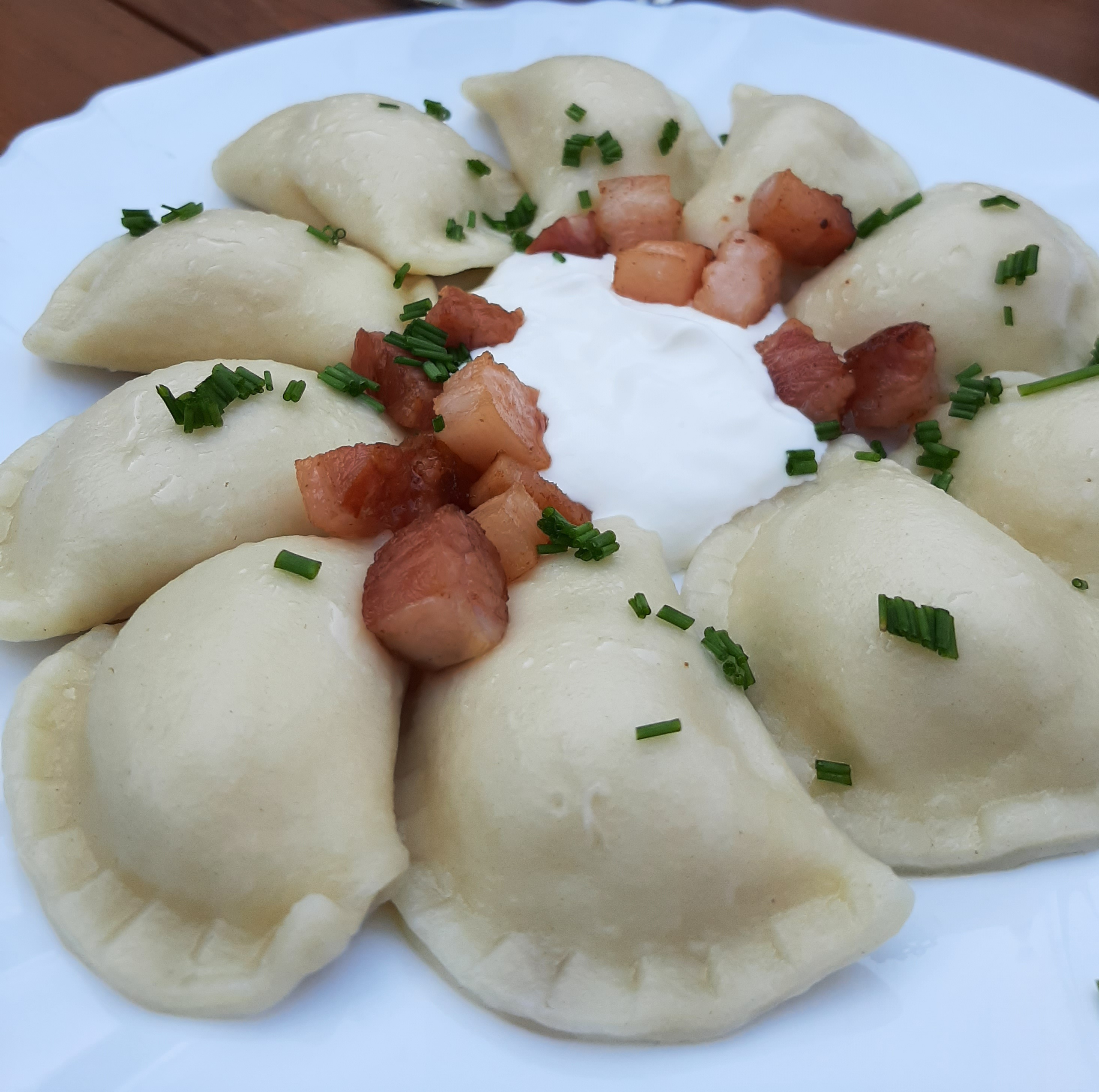
Bryndzové pirohy (bryndza-filled pierogi)

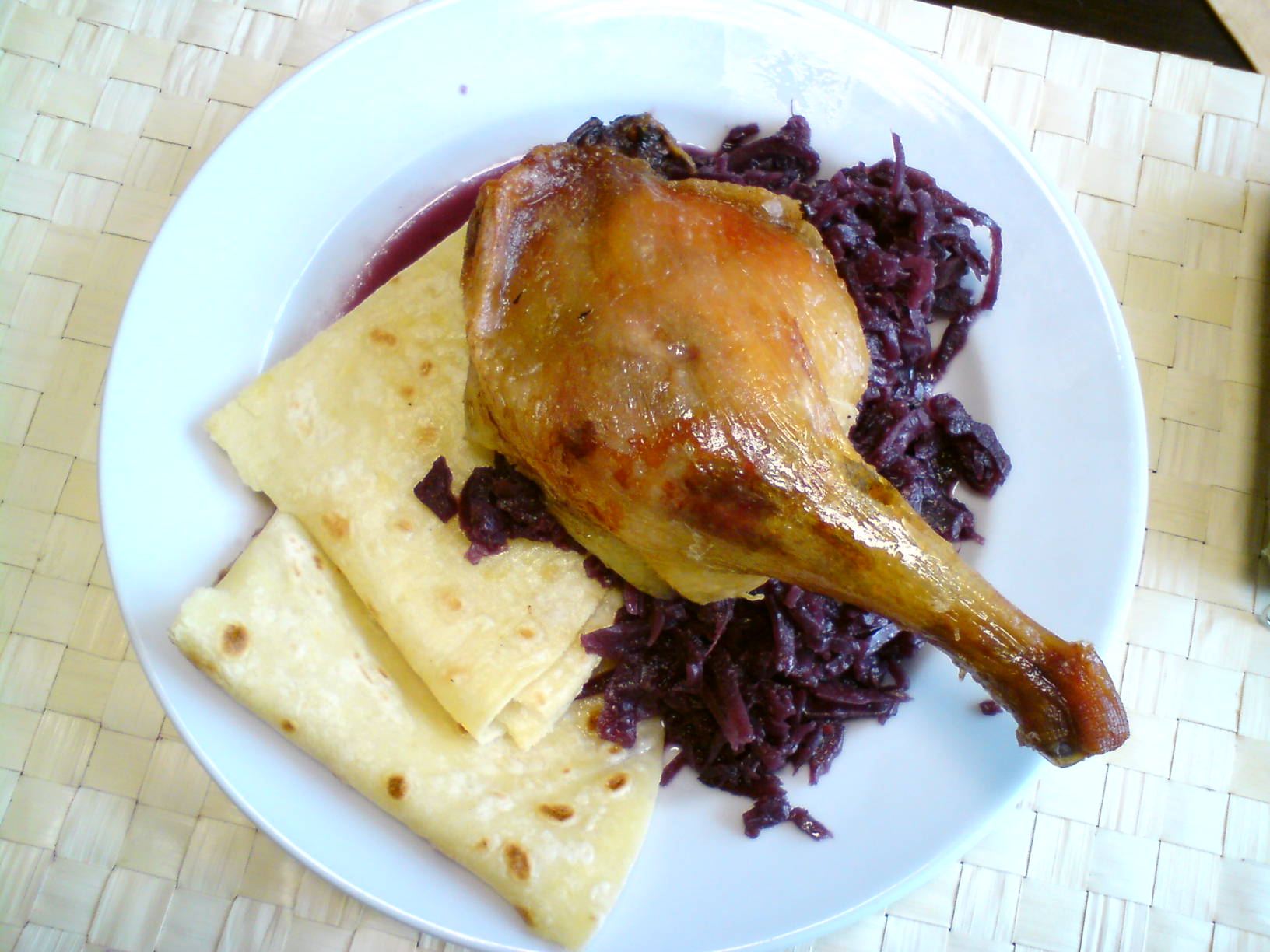
Roasted duck leg with greasy lokše and stewed red cabbage

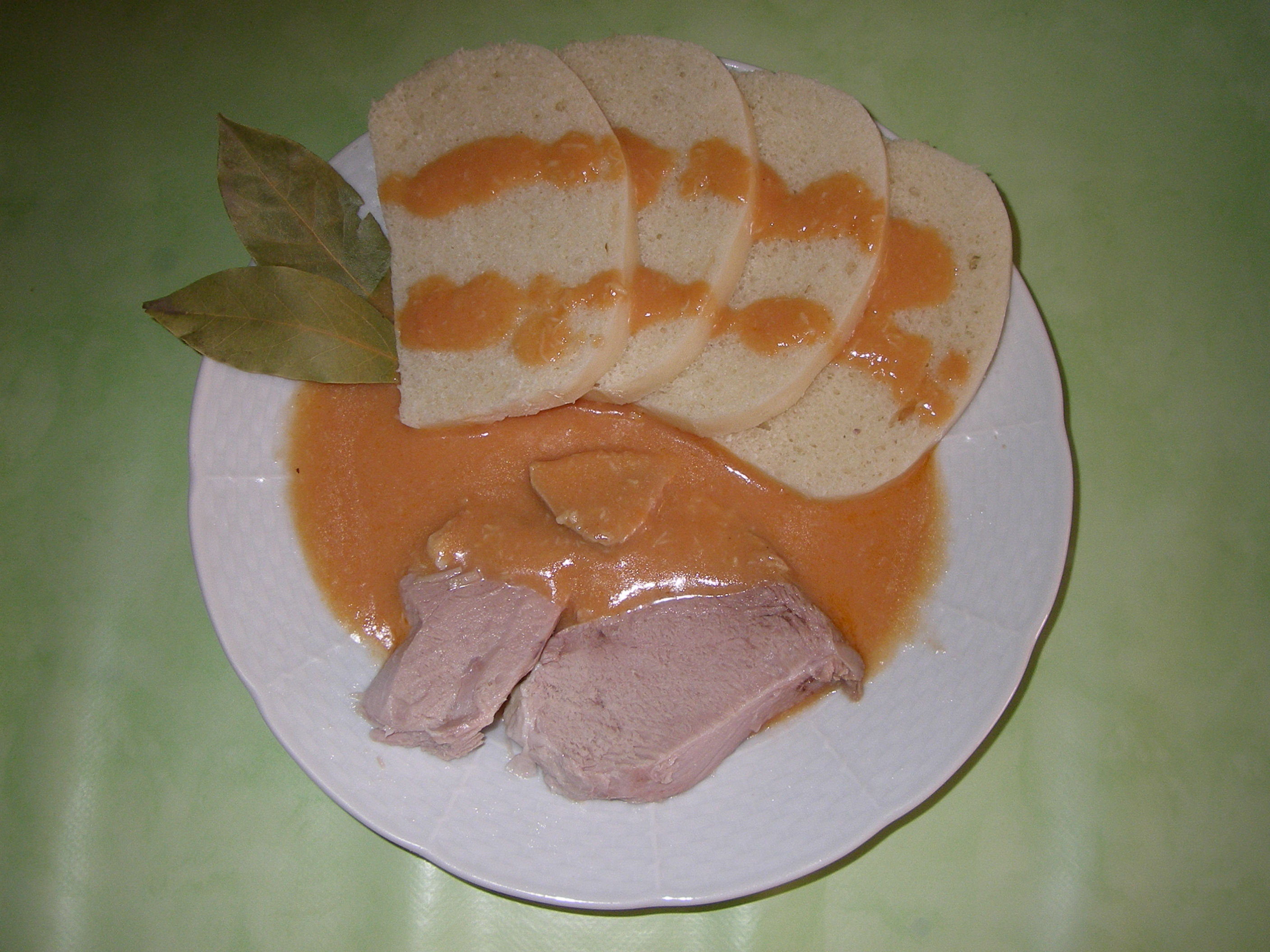
Pork with Milanese sauce and yeast dumplings

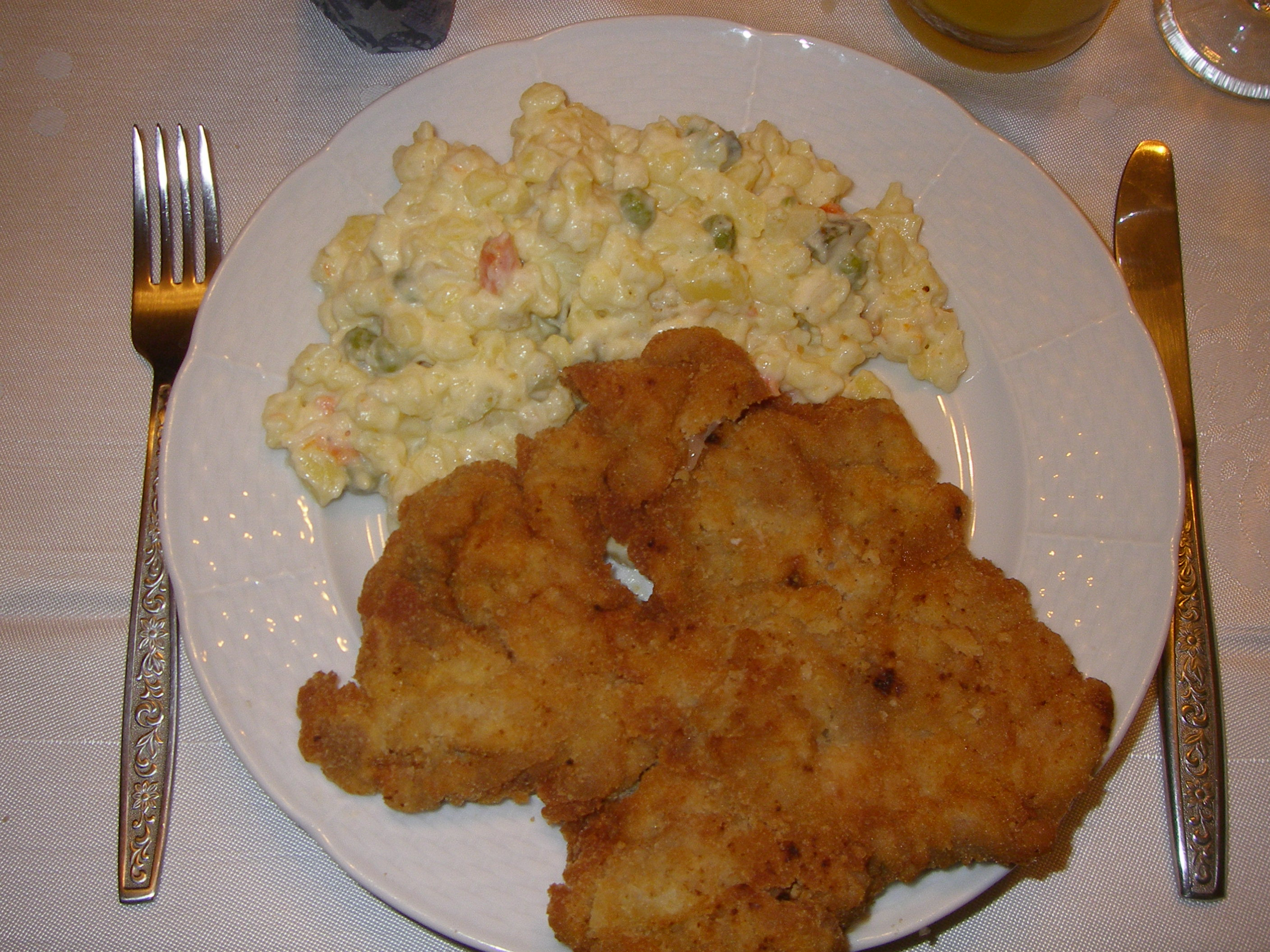
Wiener Schnitzel and potato salad

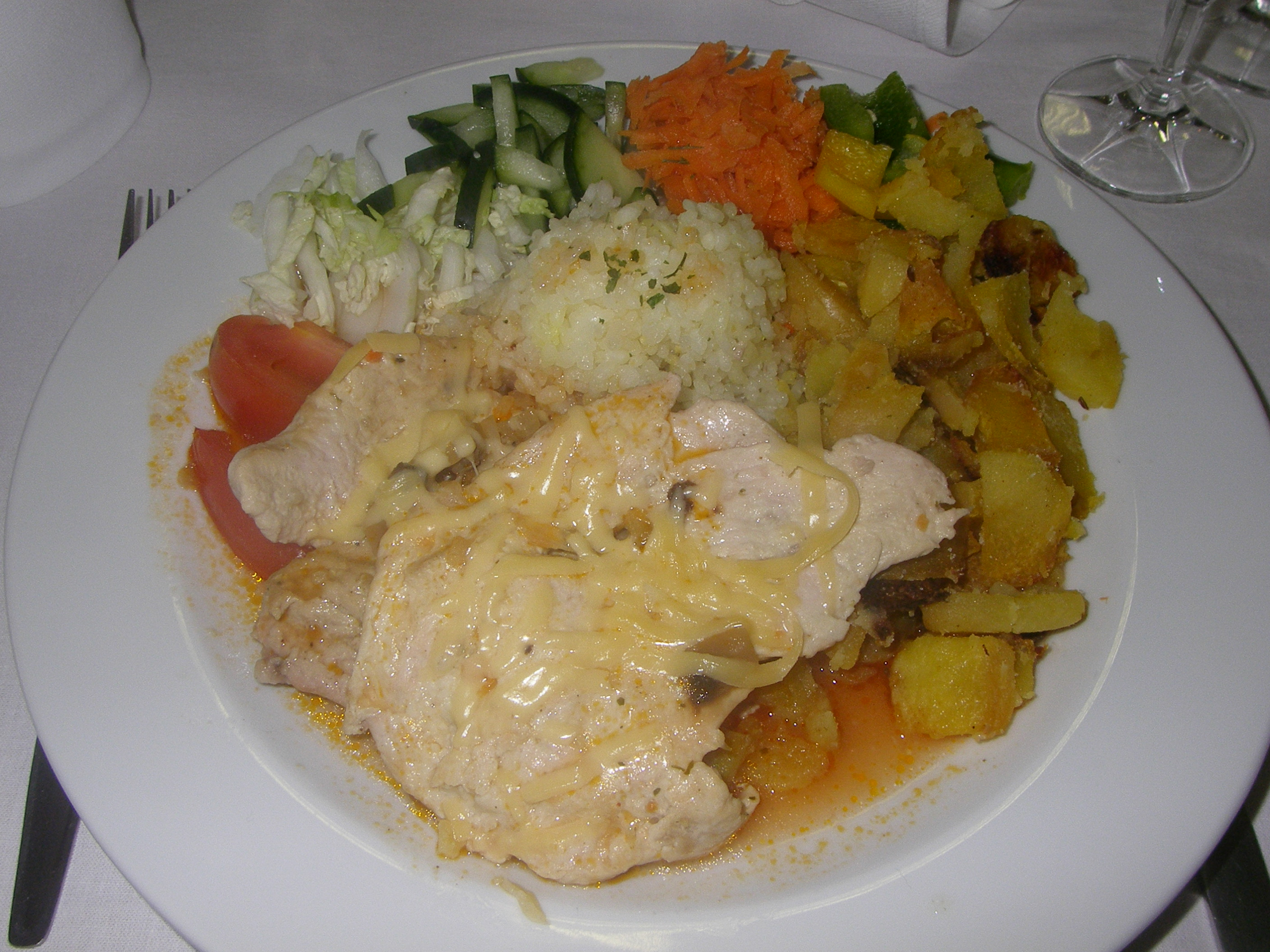
"Natural-style" (unbreaded) chicken schnitzel

== Soups and sauces ==
- Fazuľová polievka (soup made of beans, usually with pork meat and/or sausages)
- Kapustnica (soup made of sauerkraut), often also mushrooms, meat and sausage, and sometimes served in a bread bowl
- Rezancová polievka or vývar (chicken soup with noodles)
- Demikát or bryndzová polievka (bryndza-based soup)
- Tripe soup
- Gulášová polievka, traditional goulash soup
- Kotlíkový guláš, simple goulash soup made of different vegetables, potato and meat (usually beef) cooked together for hours
- Venison goulash, traditionally from deer, often served in a bread cup
- Cesnaková polievka or cesnačka: garlic soup, often served in a bread cup

== Meat ==
Pork, beef and poultry are the main meats consumed in Slovakia, with pork being the most popular by a substantial margin. Among poultry, chicken is most common, although duck, goose, and turkey are also well established. Game meats, especially boar, rabbit, and venison, are also widely available throughout the year. Lamb and goat are also available, but for the most part are not very popular. The consumption of horse meat is generally frowned upon. One poultry dish, chicken breast steak with peach, originated in the 1990s and is the target of some ridicule.

Grilled meat is not common in Slovakia. Instead, meat is either breaded and fried in oil (schnitzel), or cooked and served in sauce. Hungarian influences in Slovak cuisine can be seen in popular stews and goulashes. However, these have been given Slovak touches. Chicken paprikash is typically served with halušky and Hungarian goulash (spicy beef stew) is served with slices of a large bread-like steamed dumpling.

Local sausage types include krvavničky, a blood sausage, and jaternice (traditionally called hurky), a sausage with buckwheat containing any and all parts of a butchered pig.

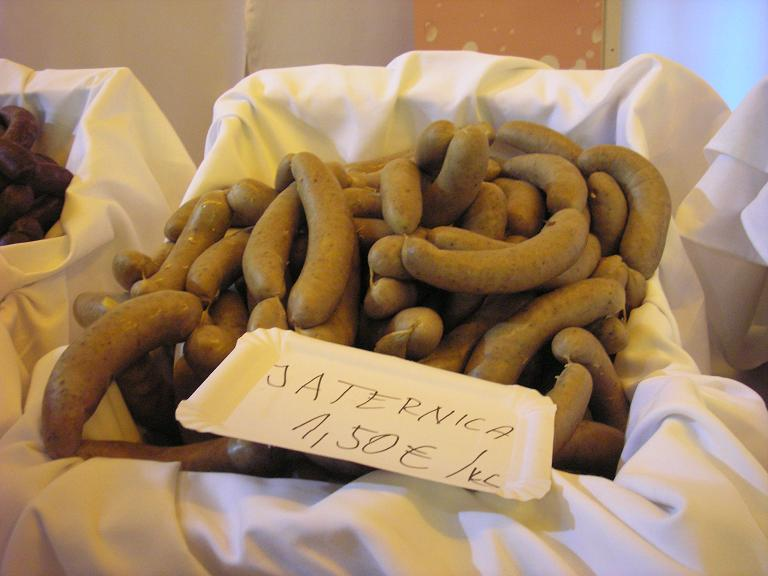
Jaternice

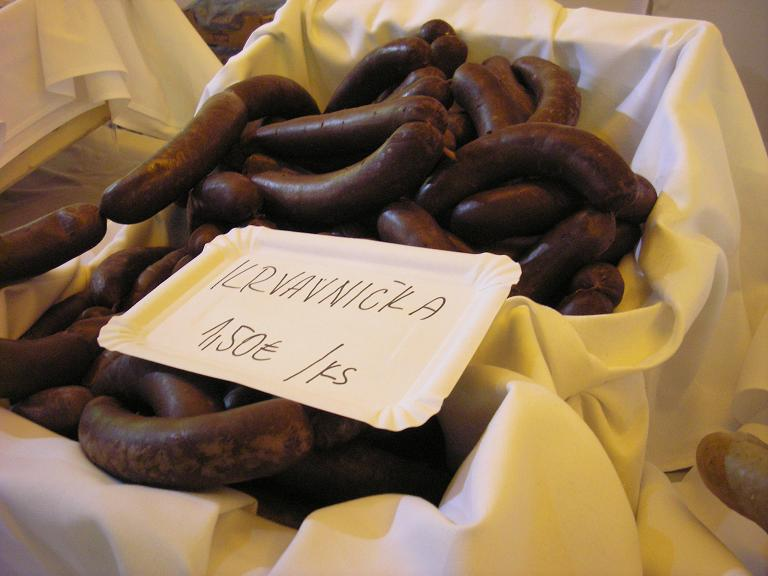
Krvavnička

== Traditional sweets and cookies ==
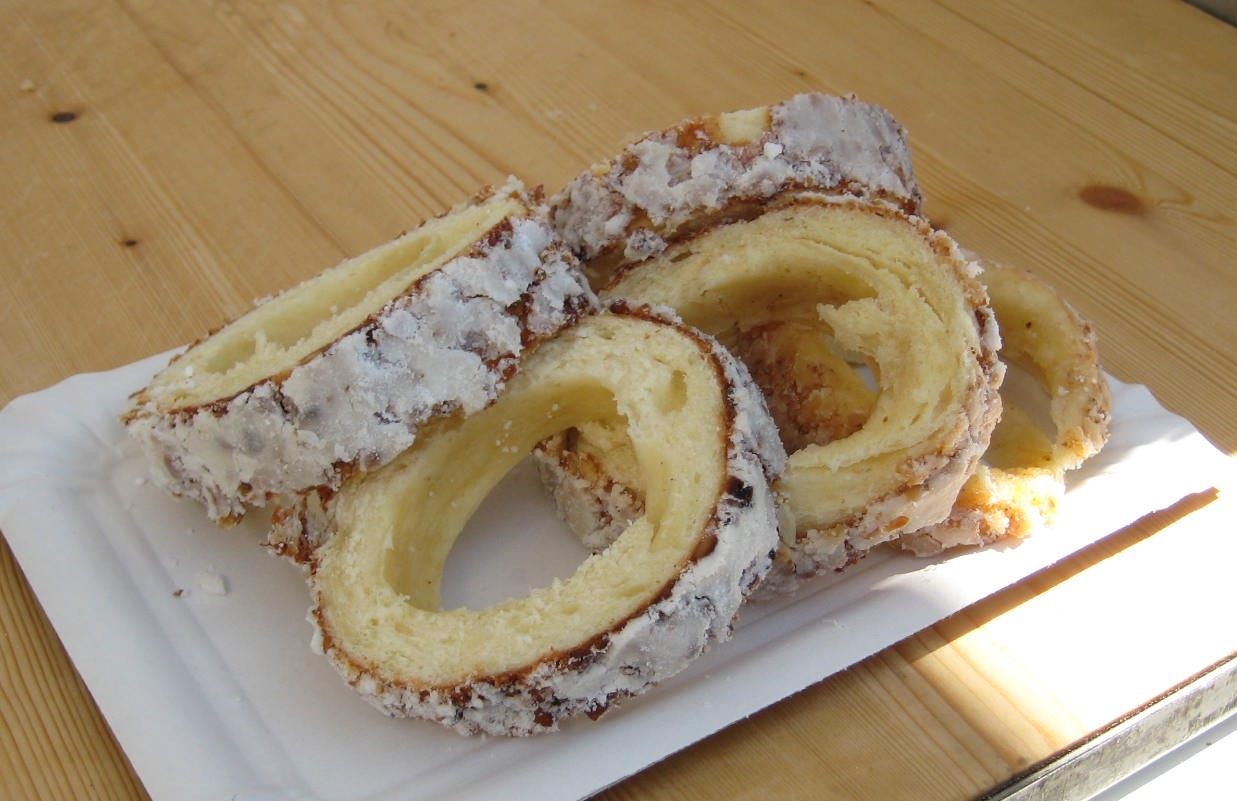
Slices of Skalický trdelník, a traditional cake and sweet pastry, from the Slovak town of Skalica, ready for serving: note the hollow interior created by baking on a cylindrical spit.

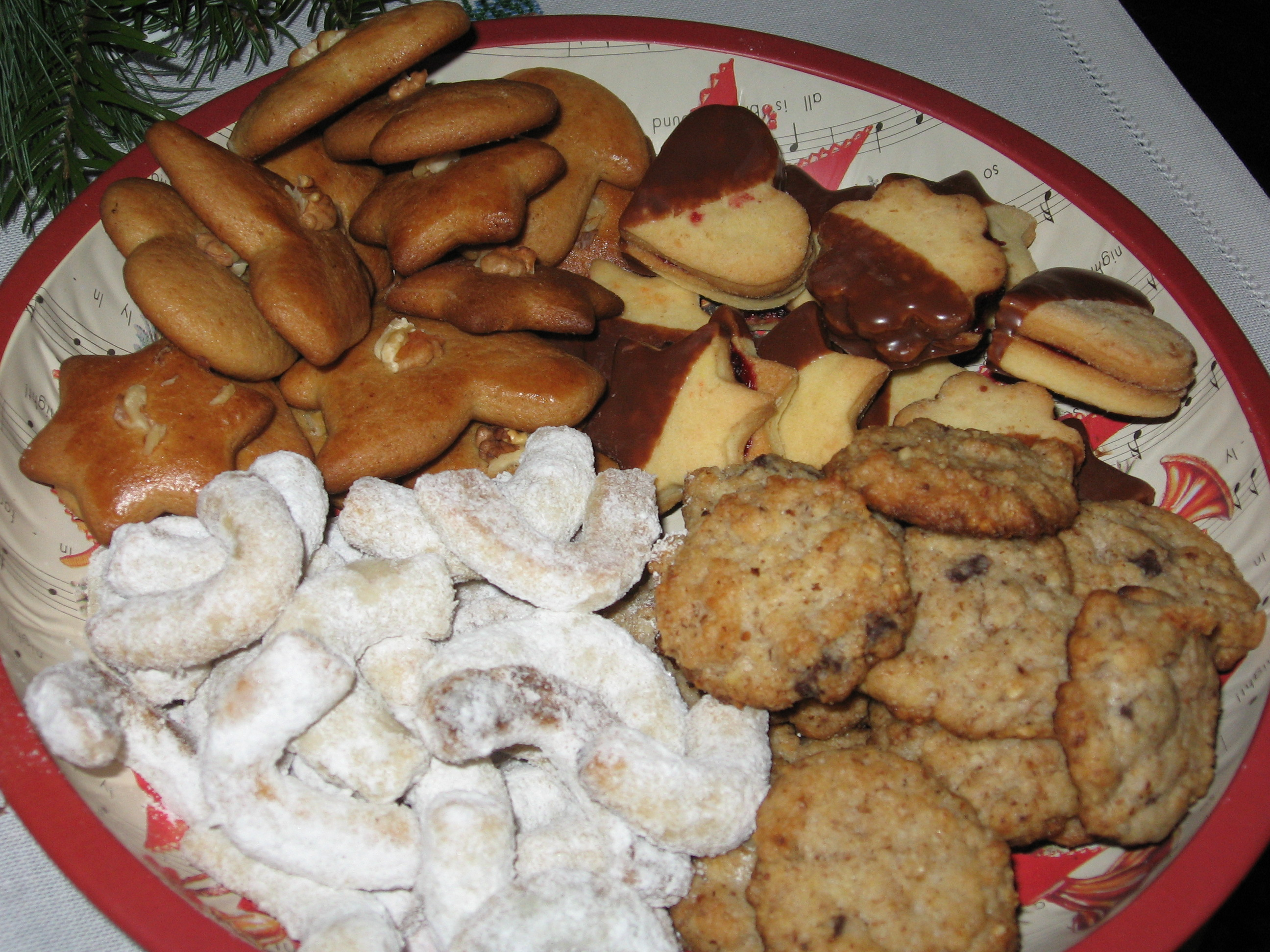
Traditional Slovak cookies

Usually baked at Christmas time, but also all year long, Slovak traditional sweets are usually home baked and harder to find in stores.

- Buchty (Buchteln)
  - Parené buchty (steamed dumplings with various fillings (jam, plum, curd, poppy) topped with poppy seeds, sugar, butter, sour cream, breadcrumbs or nuts, similar to Austrian Germknödel, and Chinese Baozi buns)
  - Pečené buchty
- Dukátové buchtičky (a sweet dish consisting of mini-Buchteln covered in warm vanilla custard)
- Jablkové pité (traditional and shortcrust pastry cake filled with grated apples, cinnamon and sugar)
- Kapustník (sweet yeast dough with cabbage-caramel filling)
- Korytnačka or Šarlota (dome-shaped cake made of roll cake and cream, inspired by the Soviet cherepakha cake and popular in the 1980s)
- Krupicová kaša (semolina pudding topped with butter, cocoa and cinnamon powder)
- Laskonky (coconut meringue cookies with walnuts and creamy filling)
- Žemľovka (bread pudding)
- Mačacie oči (two layers of cookie-like round tarts "glued" with marmalade and poured with powdered sugar)
- Ryžový nákyp (rice pudding cake)
- Orechovník (sweet walnut roll)
- Makovník (poppy seed roll)
- Bratislavské rožky (rolls of leavened dough filled with ground poppy seed or walnut, filling determines the shape)
- Trotle (two layers of cookie-like round tarts filled with chocolate cream and half-dipped in dark chocolate)
- Opekance (small leavened buns baked in a baking tray so that they are gently pressed against each other)
- Perníky (colloquially medovníky; honey based cookies, similar to gingerbread)
- Zázvorníky/ďumbierniky (ginger flavoured biscuits)
- Medvedie labky ("bear paws" – walnut/cocoa based cookies)
- Rezy (longer square (ie not round) form of cakes)
  - Bratislavské rezy ("Bratislava cuts" – sponge cake with steamed whipped custard, chocolate and sweet rum-flavored syrup)
  - Domino rezy ("domino cuts" – festive cake with three preparation methods)
  - Grilážky (wafers glued with "griláž" – burnt sugar with butter, nuts and condensed milk)
  - Krémeš (cremeschnitte)
  - Metrový koláč (meter cake)
  - Novozámocké rezy (Nové Zámky cuts – pineapple creme cake)
  - Oblíž prst ("lick the finger" – American cremeschnitte)
  - Opitý Izidor, ("drunken Izidor" – walnut and rum cake)
  - Pudingový koláč so smotanou ("pudding cake with cream")
  - Punčové rezy ("punch cuts" – sponge cake with jam layer and sugar icing with punch flavoring on top)
  - Sedmohradské rezy ("Transylvanian cuts" – Easter cake made from flour, margarine, powdered sugar, egg yolks, and a pinch of salt, which is filled with a filling of eggs, powdered sugar, chopped walnuts, breadcrumbs, and fruit jam)
  - Slovan rezy ("Slovan cuts" – cocoa sponge cake with pudding cream and caramel whipped cream)
  - Šumienkový zákusok (effervescent powder dessert)
  - Štolverkové rezy ("Stollwerck cuts")
  - Trenčanky (sponge cake with cocoa and vanilla flavor filled with jam and walnuts, often baked during Easter)
  - Žerbó rezy ("Gerbaud cuts" – walnut, jam and chocolate cake)
  - Žiarske rezy ("Žiar (nad Hronom) cuts" – cocoa sponge cake with walnut filling)
  - Žĺtkové rezy (walnut cake with egg yolk glaze)
- Salónka (szaloncukor)
- Sandokanove oči ("Sandokan's eyes" – unbaked Slovak festive dessert consisting of brown (margarine, cocoa powder, BB puding, powdered sugar) and white (margarine, coconut, powdered milk, powdered sugar) layer, filled with a mixture of chopped nuts, sugar, fat and rum and decorated with lentils. It is encased in a plastic egg carton.)
- Slivkové gule ("plum balls" – potato dumplings filled with plums, typical especially in Myjava)
- Šamrola (puff pastry tube filled with meringue or whipped cream and sprinkled with powdered sugar)
- Šiška (jam doughnut)
- Štedrák (festive Christmas cake made from layers of sweet yeast dough alternately covered with walnuts, poppy seeds, jam, and tvaroh)
- Šuhajdy (festive no-bake dessert, with chocolate on top and bottom and a middle layer of rum-flavored nuts)
- Šúľance (rolled potato dumplings with sugar or poppy seeds)
- Trdelník or Skalický trdelník (traditional cake baked on a rotating spit over open fire)
- Vanilkové rožteky (vanilla rolls)
- Veterník (choux pastry)
- Vtáčie mlieko ("bird milk" – soft meringue dumplings blanched briefly in boiling water and then placed "floating" on a base of vanilla custard)
- Zlaté halušky ("golden halušky" – tvaroh-semolina dumplings topped with sweet breadcrumbs)
- Trhanec – sliced pancakes with jam

== Main daily meal ==
Traditionally the main meal of the day is lunch, eaten around noon. However, changing work routine has altered this in the recent decades; today, many Slovaks have their main meal in the evening. Lunch in Slovakia usually consists of soup and a main course. It is customary in Slovakia to bring a bottle of wine or other alcohol as a gift if one is invited to visit someone's home.

== Books on Slovak cuisine ==
- Ján Babilon: Prvá kuchárska kniha, 1870
- Vojtech Španko a kolektív: Slovenská kuchárka, vydavat. Osveta, Martin, 1977, 4.vydanie 1982
- František Kotrba: Slovenská kuchařka, Dona, ISBN 80-7322-025-3
- Anna Demrovská: Dobrá slovenská kuchyňa, Knižné centrum, 2007, ISBN 80-85684-59-4
- Ľudmila Dullová: Veľká slovenská kuchárka, Ikar, 2007, ISBN 80-7118-783-6
- Jana Horecká: Najlepšia slovenská kuchyňa, 2007, ISBN 80-8064-300-8
- Daša Racková: Nová slovenská kuchárka, Ikar, 2007, ISBN 978-80-551-1563-4
- Zora Mintalová - Zubercová: Všetko okolo stola I., Vydavateľstvo Matice slovenskej, 2009, ISBN 978-80-89208-94-4
- Zora Mintalová - Zubercová: Všetko okolo stola II., Vydavateľstvo Matice slovenskej, 2010, ISBN 978-80-81150-13-5

== See also ==
- Czech cuisine
- Polish cuisine
