= Buchteln =

Enriched yeast bread

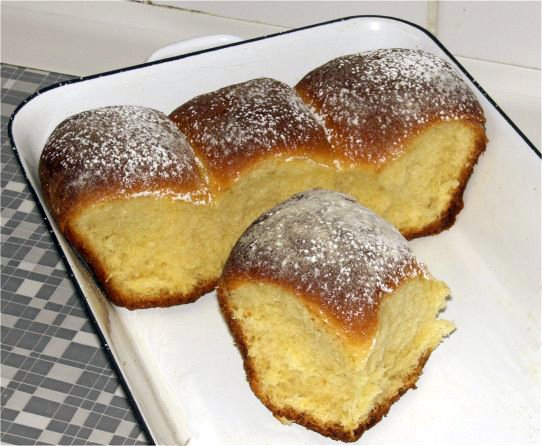
- Buchteln in a pan
- Type: Yeast dough
- Region or state: Bohemia
- Serving temperature: Tepid
- Main ingredients: Enriched yeast dough (with egg, milk and butter); jam, ground poppy seeds or curd

Buchteln (from Czech buchta, pl. buchty, also in German: pl., sing. Buchtel; also Wuchtel(n), Ofennudel(n), Rohrnudel(n)) are sweet rolls made of enriched yeast dough, filled with powidl, jam, ground poppy seeds or quark, brushed with butter and baked in a large pan so that they stick together and can be pulled apart. The traditional buchtel is filled with powidl. Buchteln may be topped with vanilla sauce, powdered sugar or eaten plain and warm. Buchteln are served tepid, mostly as a breakfast pastry or with tea. In the 19th century, they could be boiled similar to dumplings.

The origin of the buchteln is the region of Bohemia, but they also play a major part in Austrian, Slovak, Slovenian, and Hungarian cuisines. In Bavaria Buchteln are called Rohrnudeln, in Slovenian buhteljni, in Serbian бухтле/buhtle or бухтла/buhtla, in Hungarian bukta, in Kajkavian buhtli, in Croatian buhtle, in Polish buchta, and in Czech buchta or buchtička, in Lombard Buten. In Romania, in the Banat region, are called bucte.

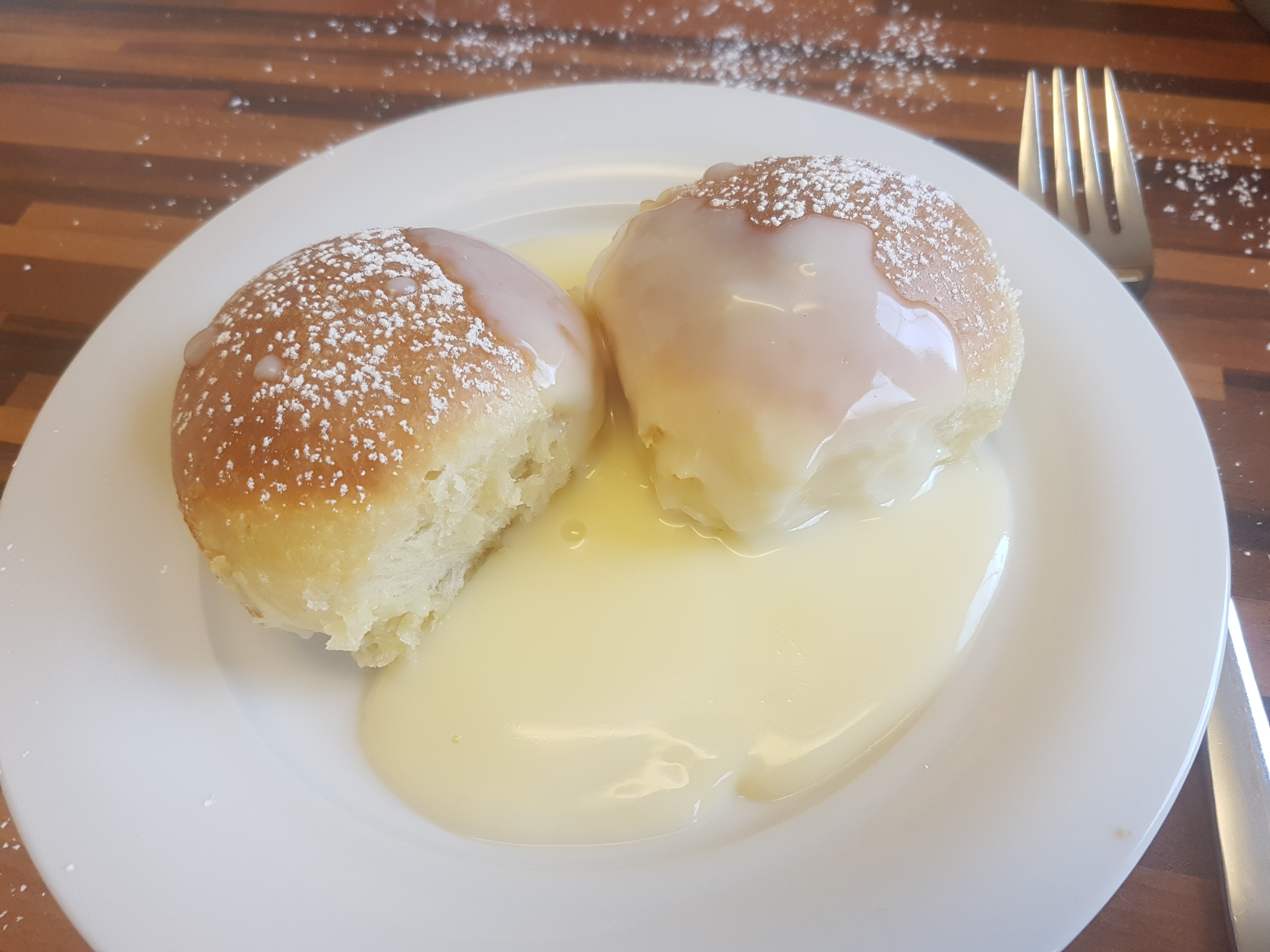
Homemade buchteln served with vanilla sauce

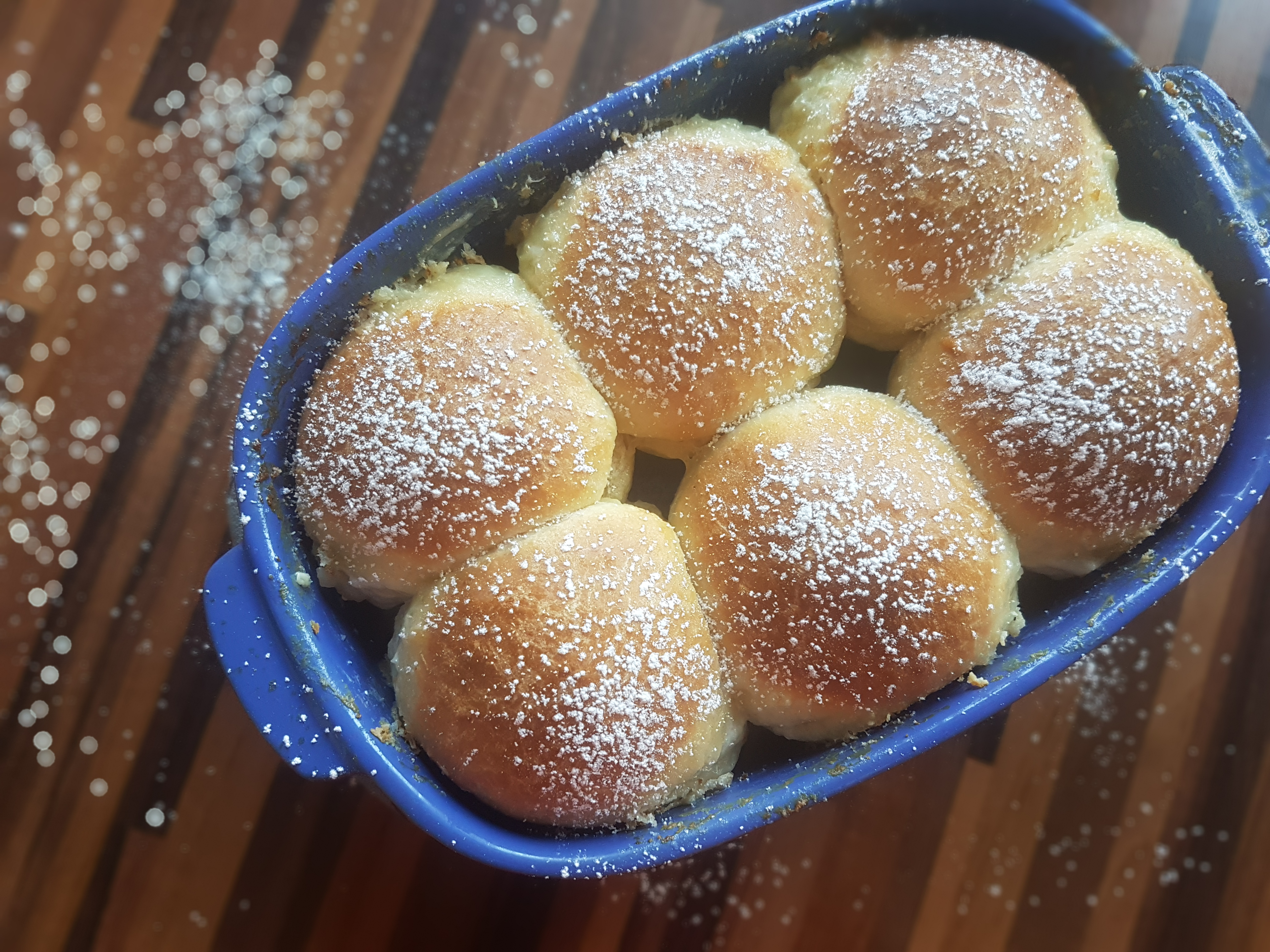
Freshly baked, homemade buchteln

== See also ==
- Gibanica
- Milk-cream strudel
- Palatschinke
