= Chicken breast steak with peach =

Slovakian food

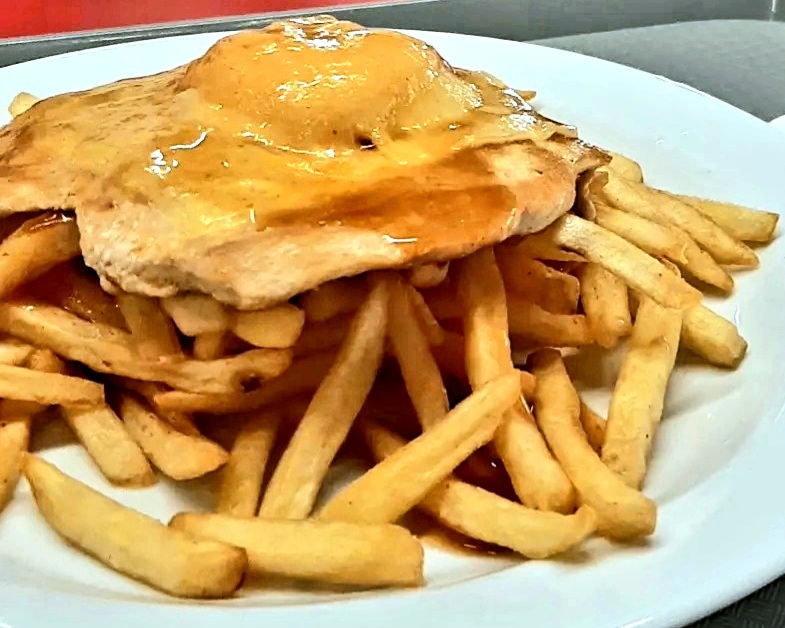
- Grilled chicken breast steak with peach and cheese, and french fries
- Alternative names: zapekané kuracie prsia s broskyňou a syrom; zapekané kuracie prsia s broskyňou; kuracie prsia s broskyňou a syrom; kuracie prsia s broskyňou; kurací plátok s broskyňou a syrom; kuřecí plátek s broskví; "Melba"; "Diana"; "Florida"
- Type: roasted meat
- Course: main
- Place of origin: unknown
- Region or state: Slovakia; Czech Republic
- Associated cuisine: Slovak cuisine; Czech cuisine
- Serving temperature: warm
- Main ingredients: chicken breast, peach, cheese, ham
- Variations: with rice or french fries, with cheese sauce or gravy
- Food energy (per serving): 150 kcal (630 kJ)

Chicken breast steak with peach (and cheese) (Slovak: (Zapekané) kuracie prsia (or kurací plátok) s broskyňou (a syrom), Czech: kuřecí plátek s broskví), colloquially "Melba", "Diana" or "Florida", is a typical 1990s dish in Slovakia with unknown origin. Nowadays, it is a frequent target of ridicule.

The dish consists of chicken breast slices with peach, usually also ham, which are baked with sliced hard cheese on top, for example eidam. Rice and french fries (half and half) with a vegetable garnish are served as a side dish, possibly with a cheese sauce.
