= Pudingový koláč =

Slovak dessert

Pudingový koláč (so smotanou)
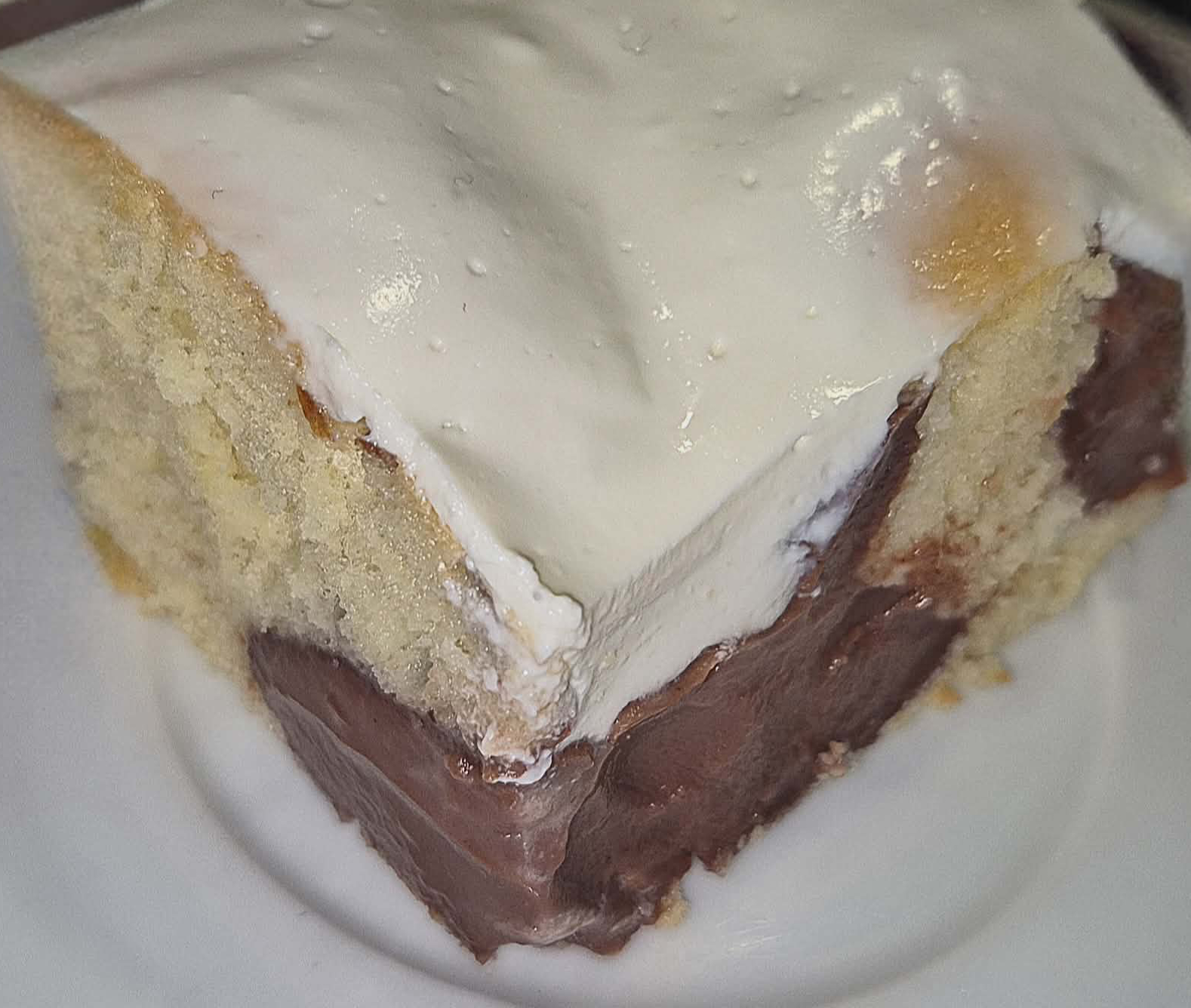
- Alternative names: pudingáč (colloquially in Slovak), pudding cake or pudding cake with cream (literally)
- Course: dessert
- Place of origin: Slovakia
- Main ingredients: Eggs, sugar, flour, baking powder, water, vegetable oil, sour cream

In Slovak cuisine, pudingový koláč (so smotanou) (Slovak pronunciation: ['pudinkɔʋiː kɔlaːts 'zɔ smɔtanɔu], literally pudding cake (with cream), colloquially pudingáč) is a cake base of sponge cake, pudding and sweetened sour cream.

== Recipe ==
The sponge cake is prepared with eggs, sugar, flour, baking powder, water and vegetable oil. Heaps of cooked pudding are placed on top of the dough and everything is baked for 40 minutes at 180 °C. After baking, a mixture of sour cream, possibly even whipped cream, and vanilla sugar is spread on the cake and can be placed in the refrigerator. It can be decorated with cocoa powder.
