= Tripe soup =

Soup made with cow or sheep stomach

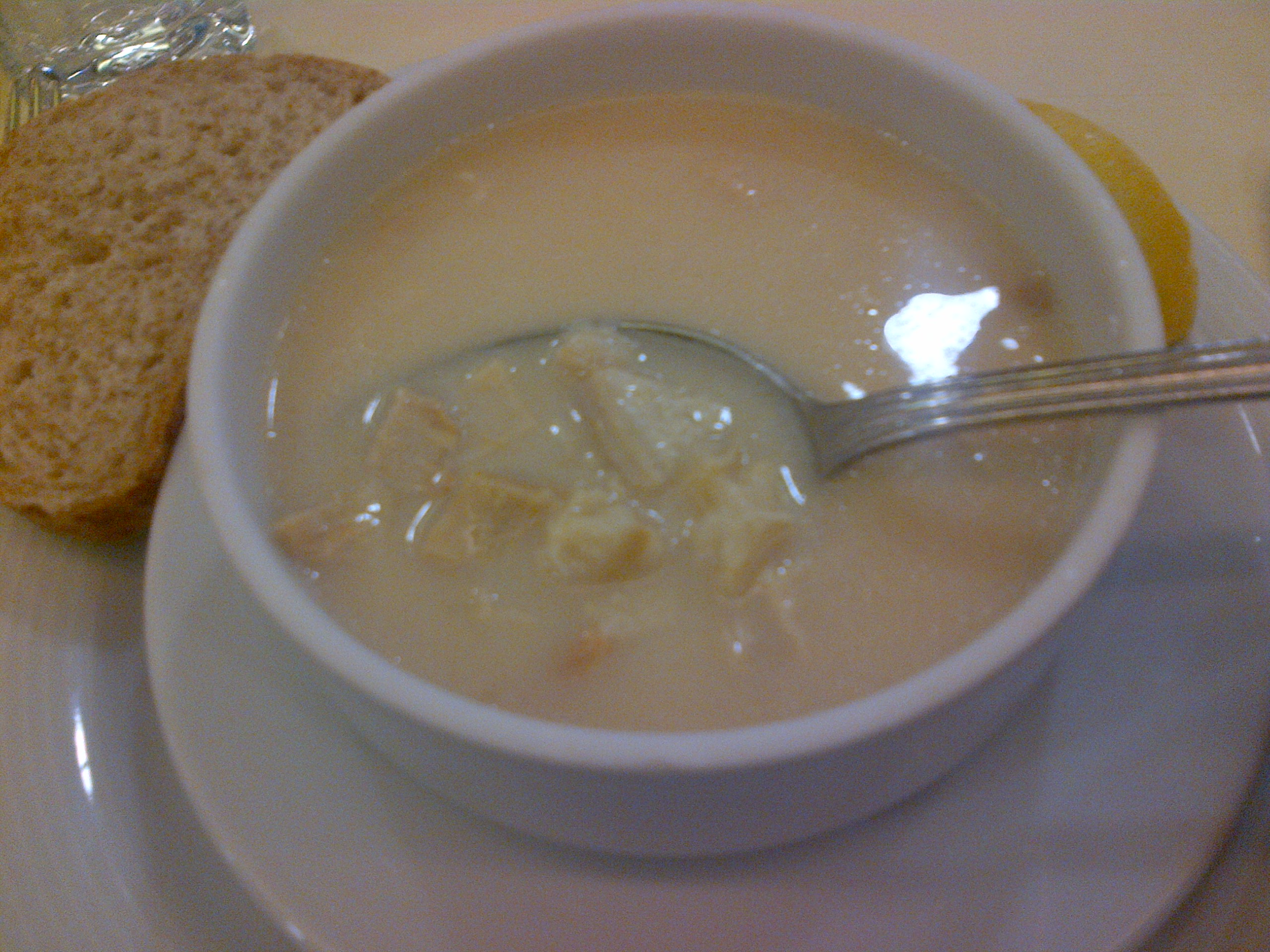
- Tripe soup (işkembe çorbası) from Turkey
- Course: Soup
- Main ingredients: Offal (Tripe)

Tripe soup or tripe stew is a soup or stew made with tripe (cow or lamb/mutton stomach). It is widely considered to be a hangover remedy.

== Etymology ==
The Turkish name is işkembe çorbası 'tripe soup', from Persian shekambe (شکمبه, "rumen") and shurba (شوربا, "soup"). Some South Slavic languages borrowed the dish name from Turkish: as škembe čorba (шкембе чорба) in Bulgarian and čkembe čorba (чкембе чорба) in Macedonian, as škembić (шкембић) in Serbian and Bosnian, and Çorbë in Albanian.

== Southeastern and Central Europe ==
Tripe chorba (Turkish: işkembe çorbası, Romanian: ciorbă de burtă, Bulgarian: шкембе чорба, romanized: škembe čorba, Macedonian: чкембе чорба, romanized: čkembe čorba) is a common dish in Southeastern and Central Europe. It is frequently considered to be a hangover remedy.

=== Turkey ===
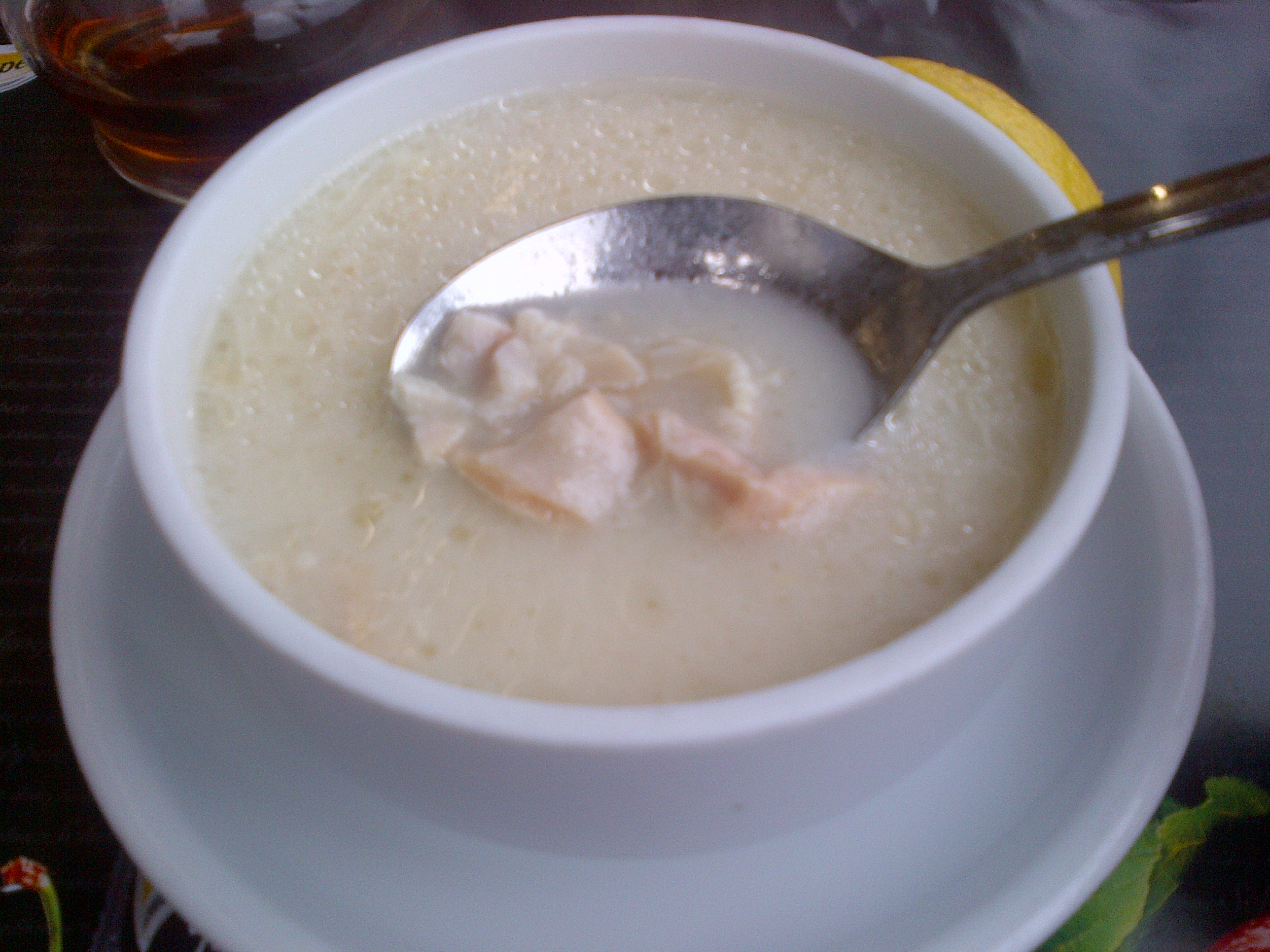
İşkembe çorbası

In Turkish cuisine, tripe çorba (işkembe çorbası) is generally made of cow's stomach and eaten usually with a vinegar-garlic sauce added on the table or with the addition of an egg yolk-lemon juice (called terbiye) in the kitchen, after cooking and before service. Although the general name işkembe çorbası is very common, especially at the traditional restaurants dedicated to this soup, offal of cow and sheep and kelle (sheep head meat, especially cheeks, baked) are also offered. A dish can be ordered and made from the various parts of the stomach: "Tuzlama, işkembe, şırdan and damar". As in several other countries, it is seen as a "hangover remedy" and finds itself a place in almost all New Year's Eve menus, served right after midnight. This has been the case since the 1800s, when it was first reported as a popular soup among Ottomans to consume immediately after a session of heavy social drinking, usually of rakı.

=== Bulgaria ===
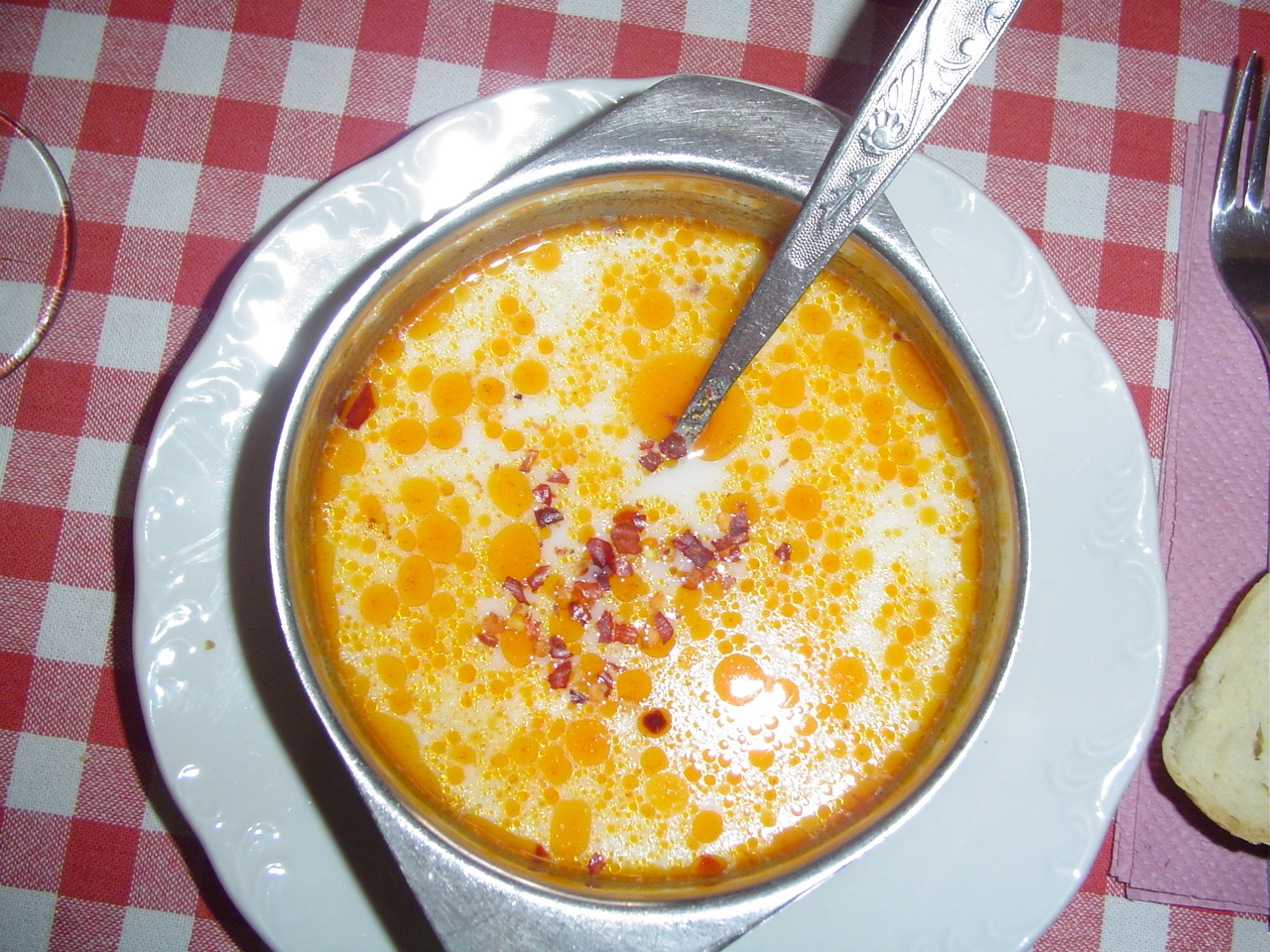
Shkembe chorba

In Bulgaria, škembe čorba (шкембе чорба) is made with whole pork, beef or lamb tripe, boiled for a few hours, chopped in small pieces, and returned to the broth. The soup is spiced with ground red paprika which is briefly fried (запръжка), and often a small quantity of milk is added. Traditionally, the soup is served with mashed garlic in vinegar and hot red pepper. There is a variant of the soup with intestines instead of tripe.

The soup was very popular with the working class until the late 1980s, and there were many restaurants serving only shkembe chorba (шкембеджийница, "shkembe restaurant"). Later they were replaced by fast food restaurants but the soup is still highly regarded, and is part of the menu in any cheap to moderately-priced restaurant.

=== Greece ===
In Greek cuisine, tripe soup is known as patsas (πατσάς), although the name is borrowed from Turkish paça çorbası, a trotter soup.

=== Romania ===
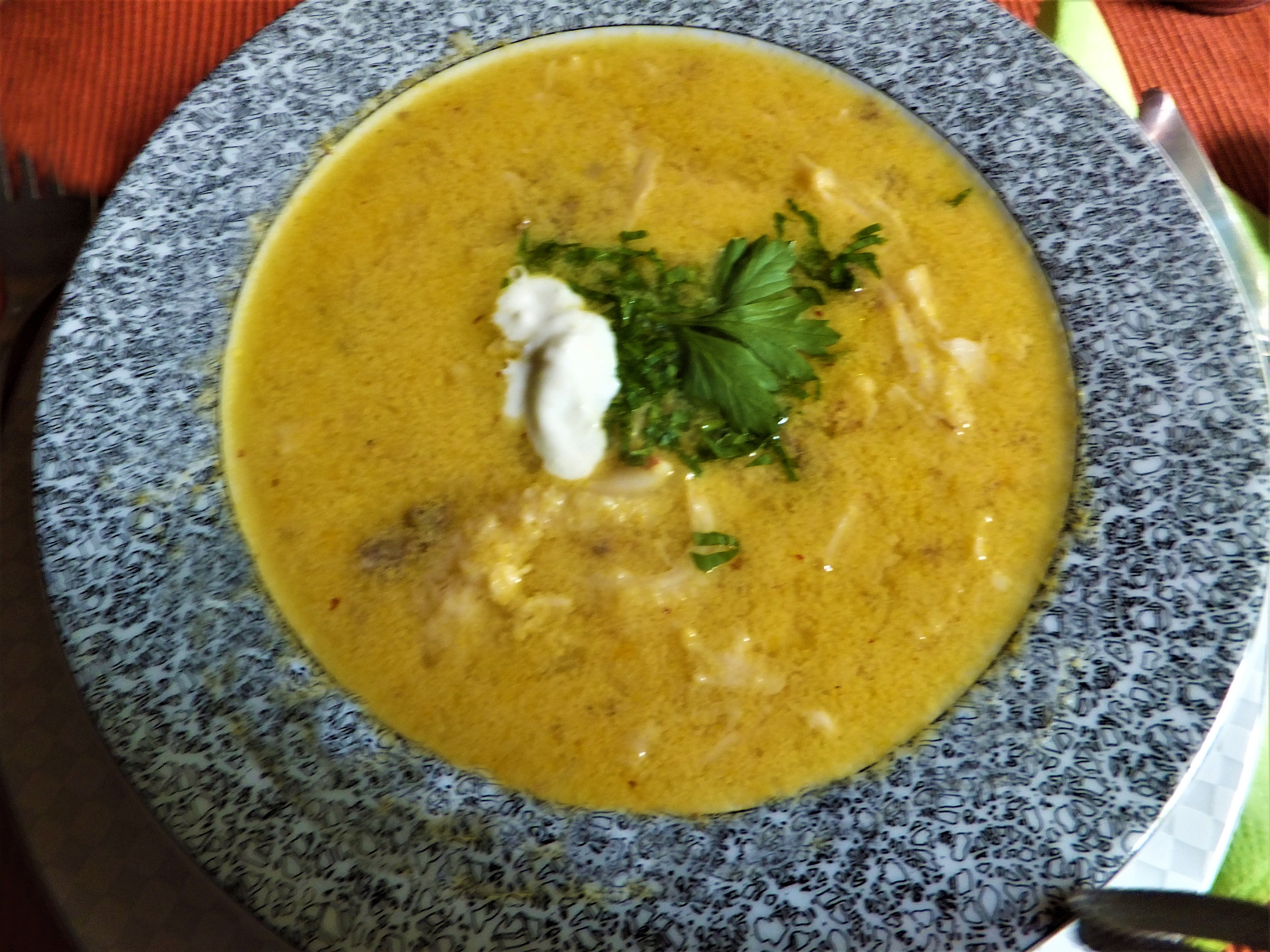
Ciorbă de burtă

The Romanian name for sour tripe soup is ciorbă de burtă (from ciorbă 'sour soup' < Turkish çorba + burtă 'tripe'). The Romanian ciorbă de burtă is similar to ciorbă de ciocănele (soup from pork legs). Ciorbă de burtă is often thickened with flour, high-fat sour cream/creme fraiche and egg yolks, colored with fried grated carrots or peppers, and seasoned with vinegar, high-fat sour cream (smântână) and garlic dip (crushed garlic mixed with oil), called mujdei. The Romanian journalist Radu Anton Roman said that ciorbă de burtă "looks like it is made for drunk coachmen but it has the most sophisticated and pretentious mode of preparation in all Romanian cuisine. It's sour and sweet, hot and velvety, fatty but delicate, eclectic and simple at the same time."

If sour base made of fermented wheat bran called borş is used in sour tripe soup, the sour soup is called a borş, not a ciorbă.

=== Serbia ===
In Serbia, this soup is made of fresh tripe cooked with onions, garlic and paprika. It is usually seasoned with fried bacon and more garlic, sometimes thickened with flour (запршка). Some versions of shkembe chorba are made with milk; garlic, vinegar, and chili peppers are often added as seasoning.

=== Croatia ===
In Croatian cuisine, it is known as fileki, tripice or vampi.

=== Hungary ===
In Hungarian cuisine, tripe soup is called pacalleves or simply pacal. Pacalpörkölt is a tripe stew heavily spiced with paprika.

=== Slovakia ===
In Slovak cuisine, it is known as držková polievka, usually shortened to držková. It is a stew based on pieces of pre-cooked tripe, lard, and onion, spiced with paprika, garlic, caraway seeds, and marjoram. It may contain potatoes and rarely also carrots.

=== Poland ===
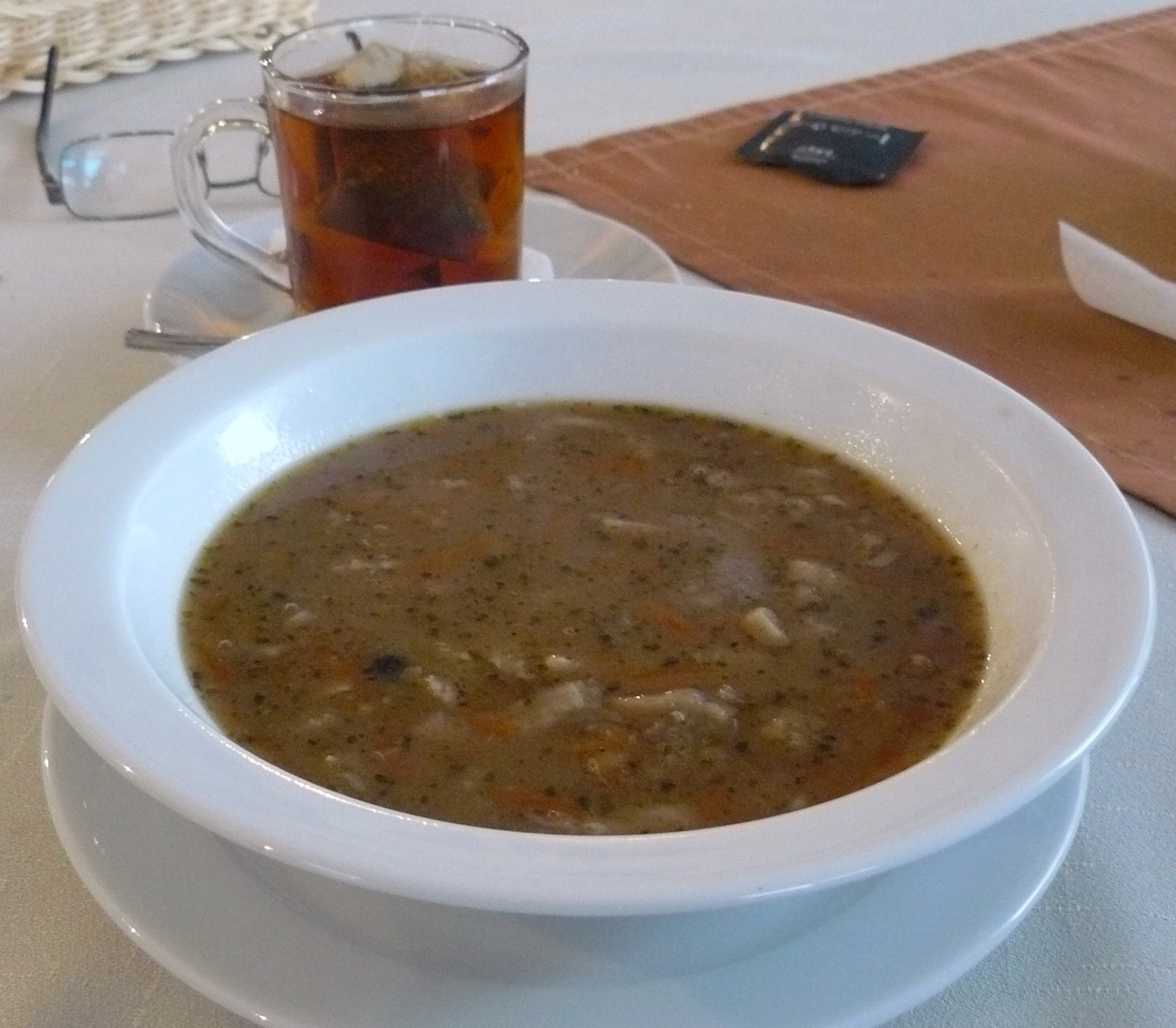
Polish flaczki or flaki

In Polish cuisine, tripe soup is known as flaki or flaczki.

=== Czech Republic ===
In Czech cuisine, tripe soup is heavily spiced with paprika, onions and garlic, resulting in a very distinct spicy goulash-like flavour. The Czech name is dršťková polévka, often shortened to dršťkovka.

=== Germany ===
In German cuisine, there are a number of different versions of sour tripe soup from southern parts of the country, including Bavaria, Saxony and Swabia. Seasonings include lard, onions, garlic, meat broth, wine vinegar, bay leaf, salt, and pepper. In the nineteenth century in parts of the German Empire that are now Poland (like Silesia), flaki were a street food. The tripe was cooked with long bones, celery root, parsley root, onions, and bay leaf. The tripe was then sliced, breaded and fried, and returned to the broth with some vinegar, marjoram, mustard, salt, and pepper.

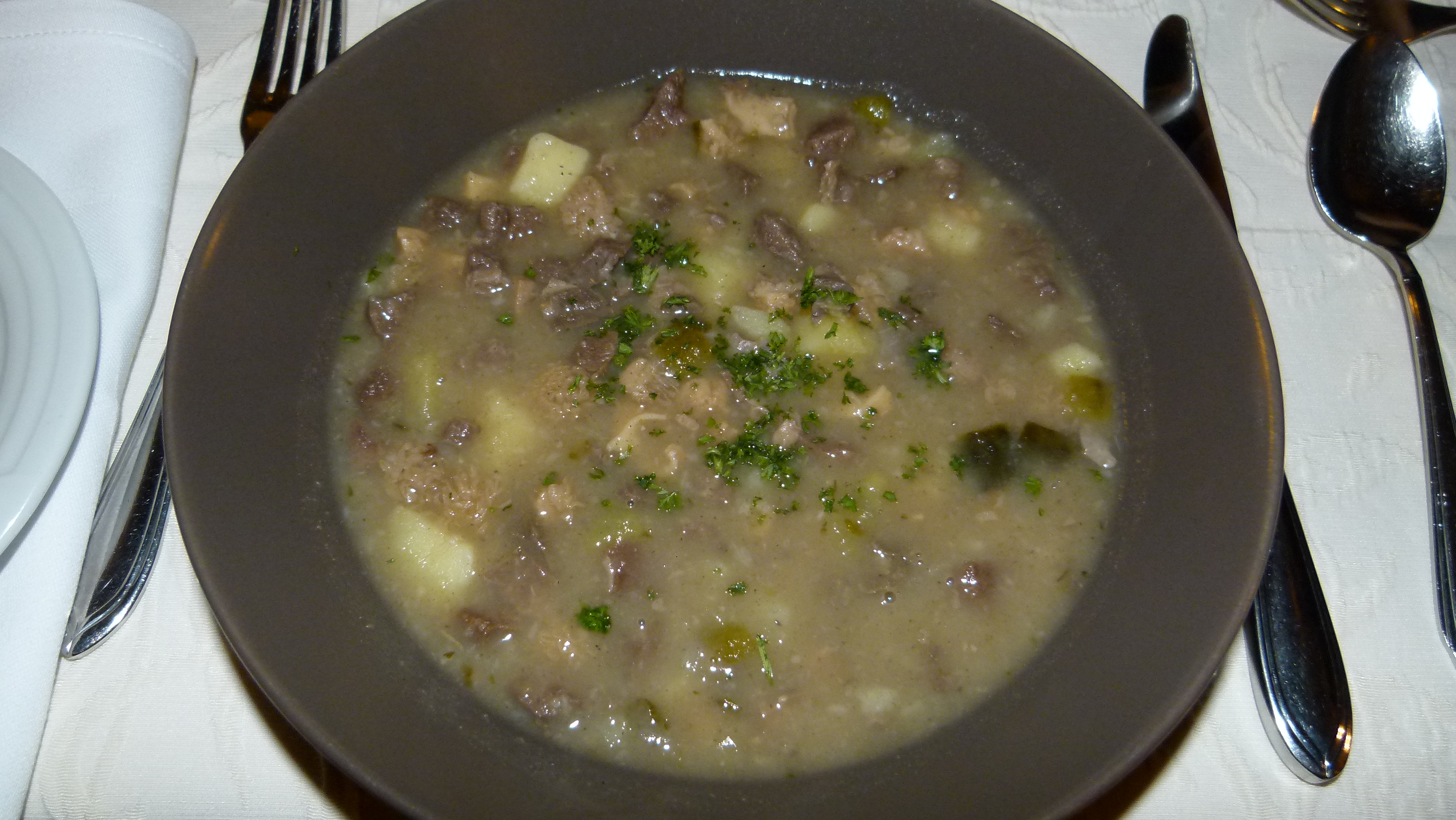
Saxon Flecke

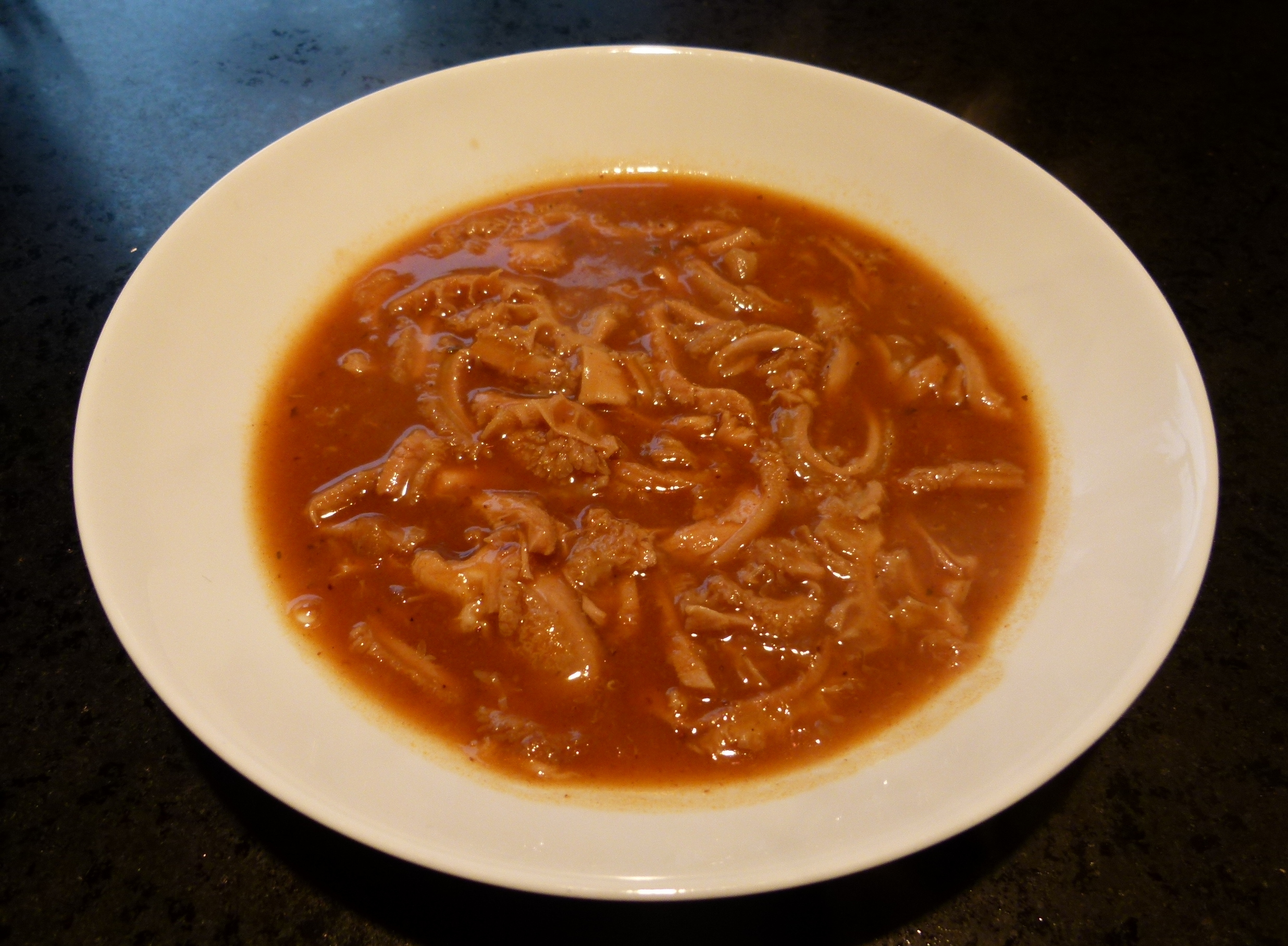
Swabian Saure Kutteln

== Western and Southern Europe ==
In French cuisine, tripes à la mode de Caen is a traditional dish of the cuisine of Normandy and tripes à la provençale from the Provence area is among others which are famous.

In Italian cuisine, trippa alla fiorentina is a traditional dish of the Florence and trippa alla milanese or busecca is a traditional dish of Milan. Caldume (Italian) or quarumi (Sicilian) is a Sicilian dish of veal tripe stewed with vegetables, served as a street food in Palermo and Catania.

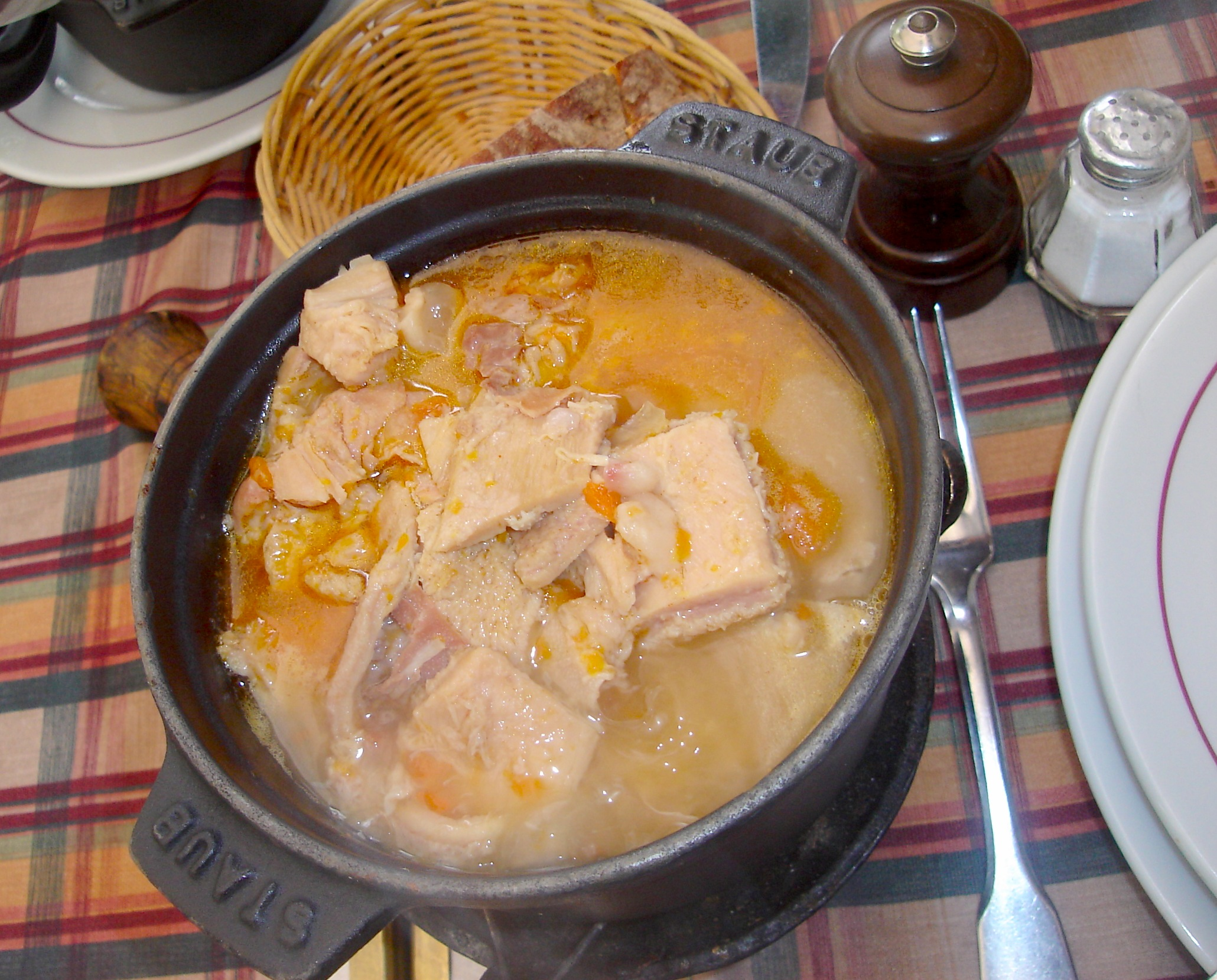
Tripes à la mode de Caen

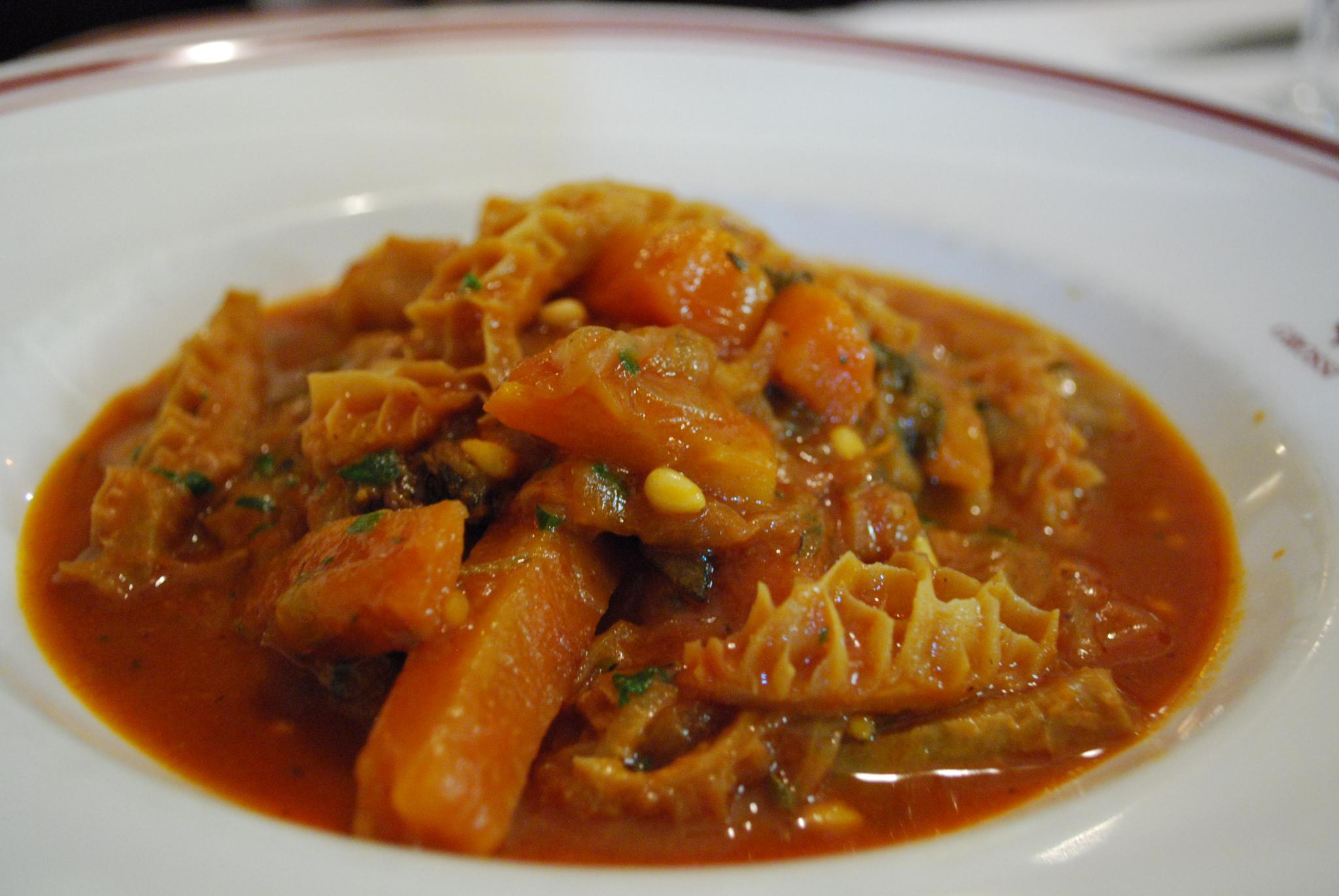
Trippa alla fiorentina

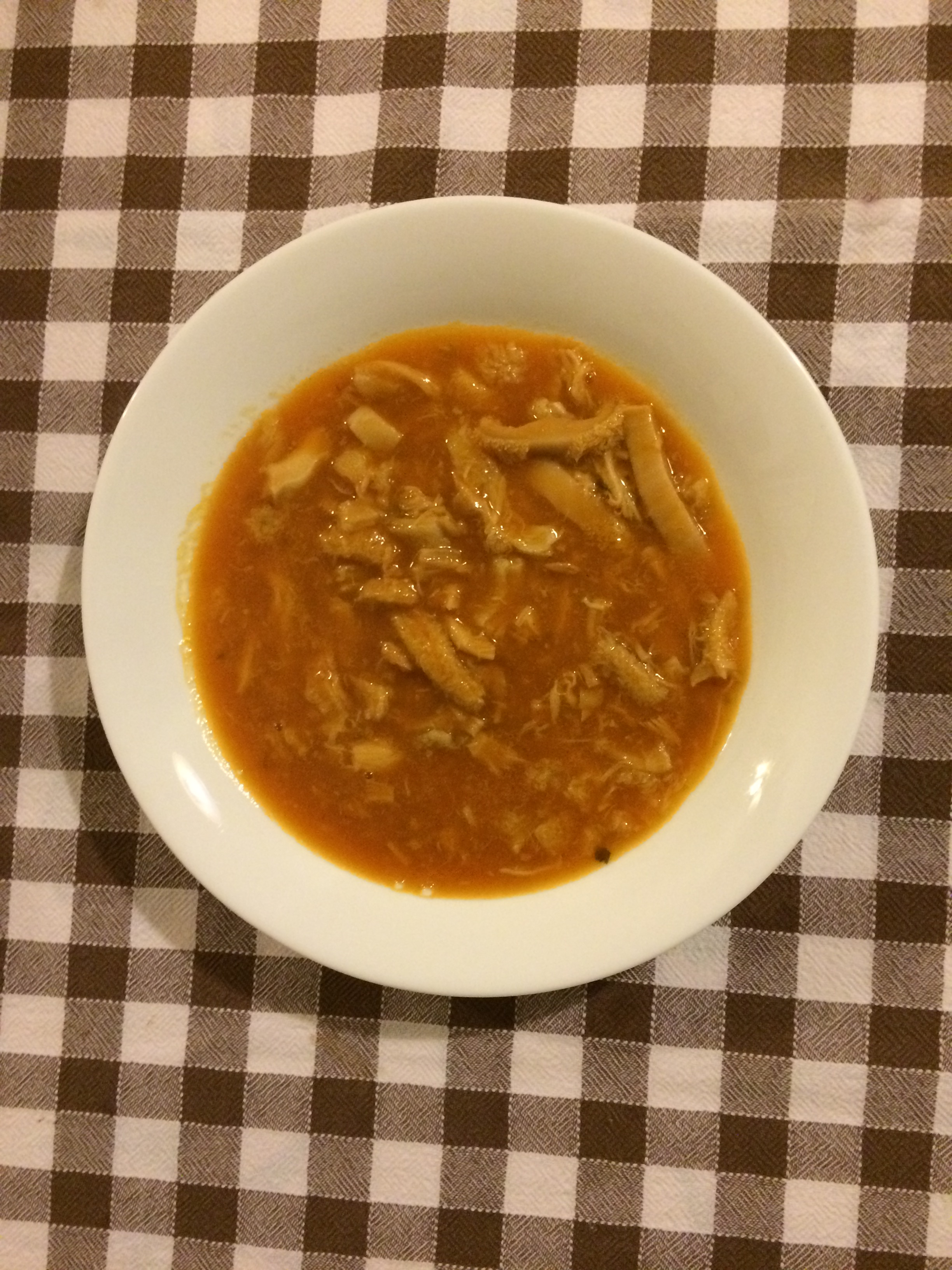
Trippa alla milanese

== Africa ==
Tripe soups/stews in Africa include Mala mogudu in South Africa, Matumbo wet fry in Kenya and Nigerian tripe stew. Other countries and regions have different tripe soups and stews.

== North and South America ==
In Caribbean and Latin American cuisines, tripe soup known as sopa de mondongo is eaten.

In Mexican cuisine, menudo, a tripe soup with red chili pepper based-broth, is eaten.

In Peruvian cuisine, Mondonguito a la italiana and Cau cau are eaten.

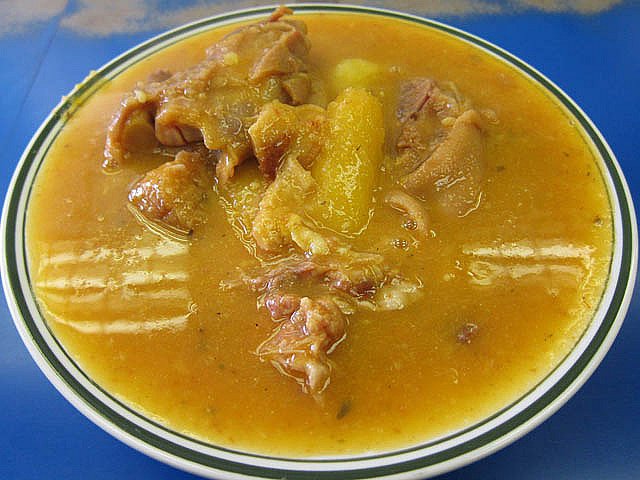
Sopa de mondongo

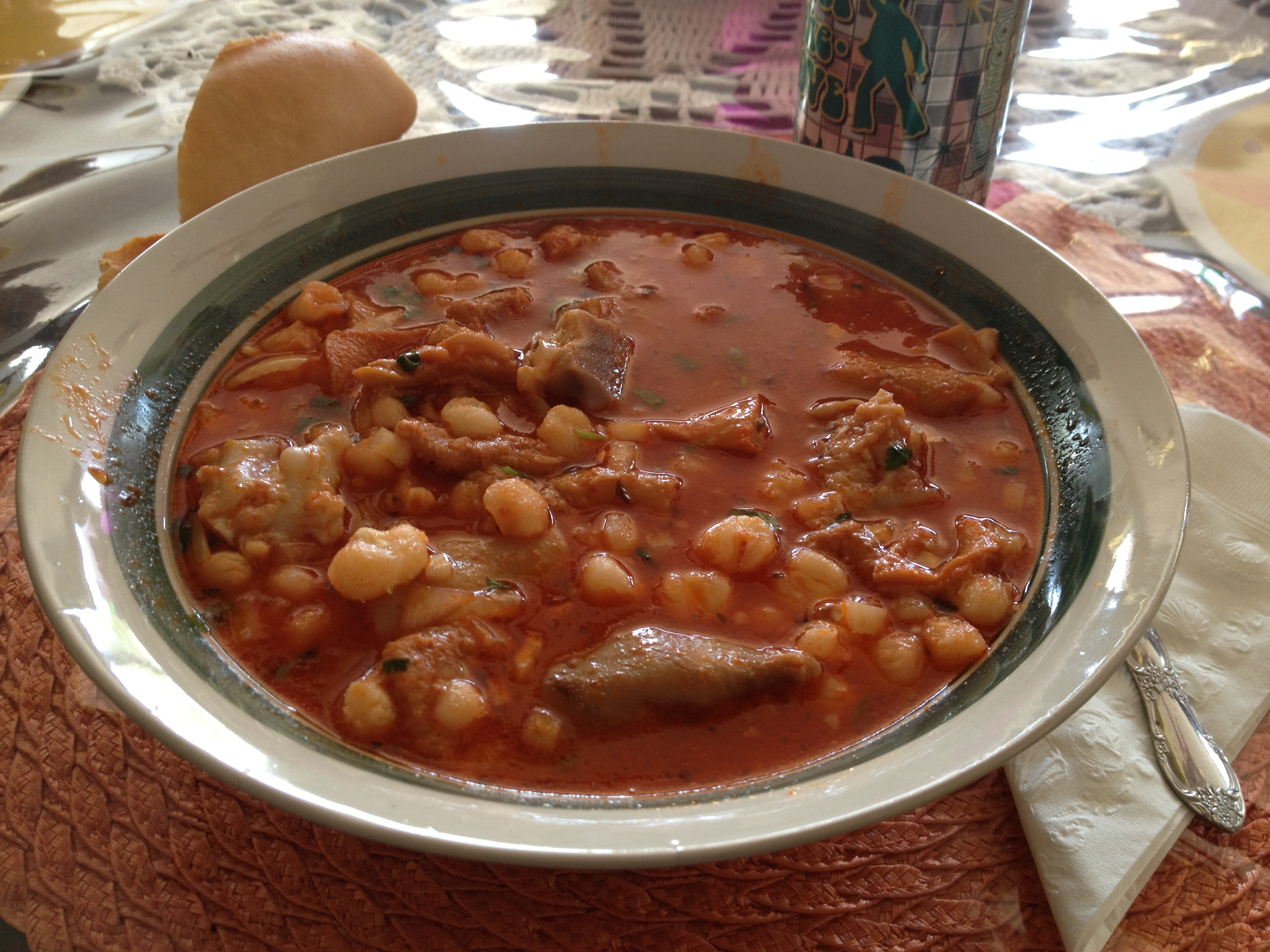
Menudo

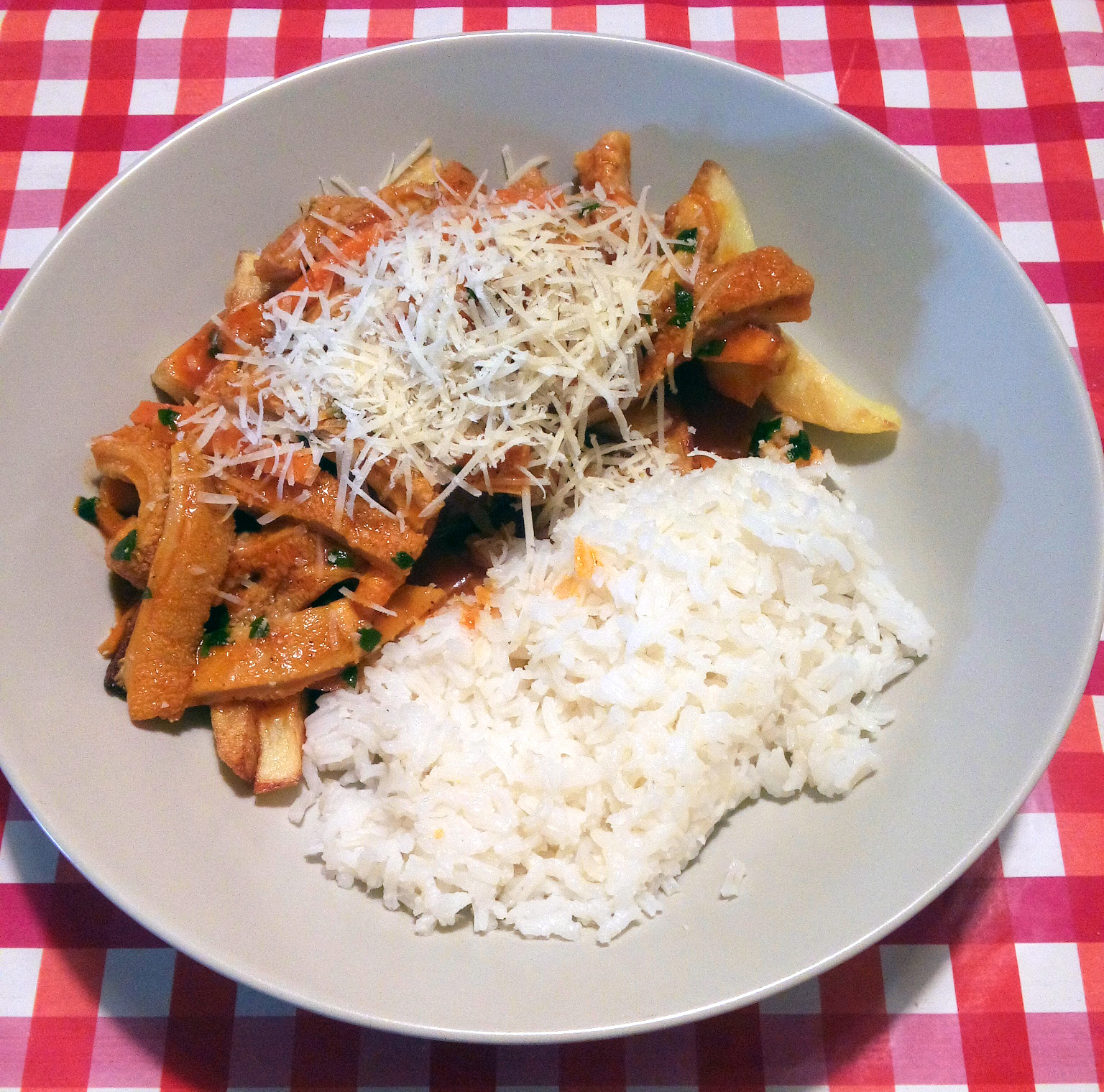
Mondonguito

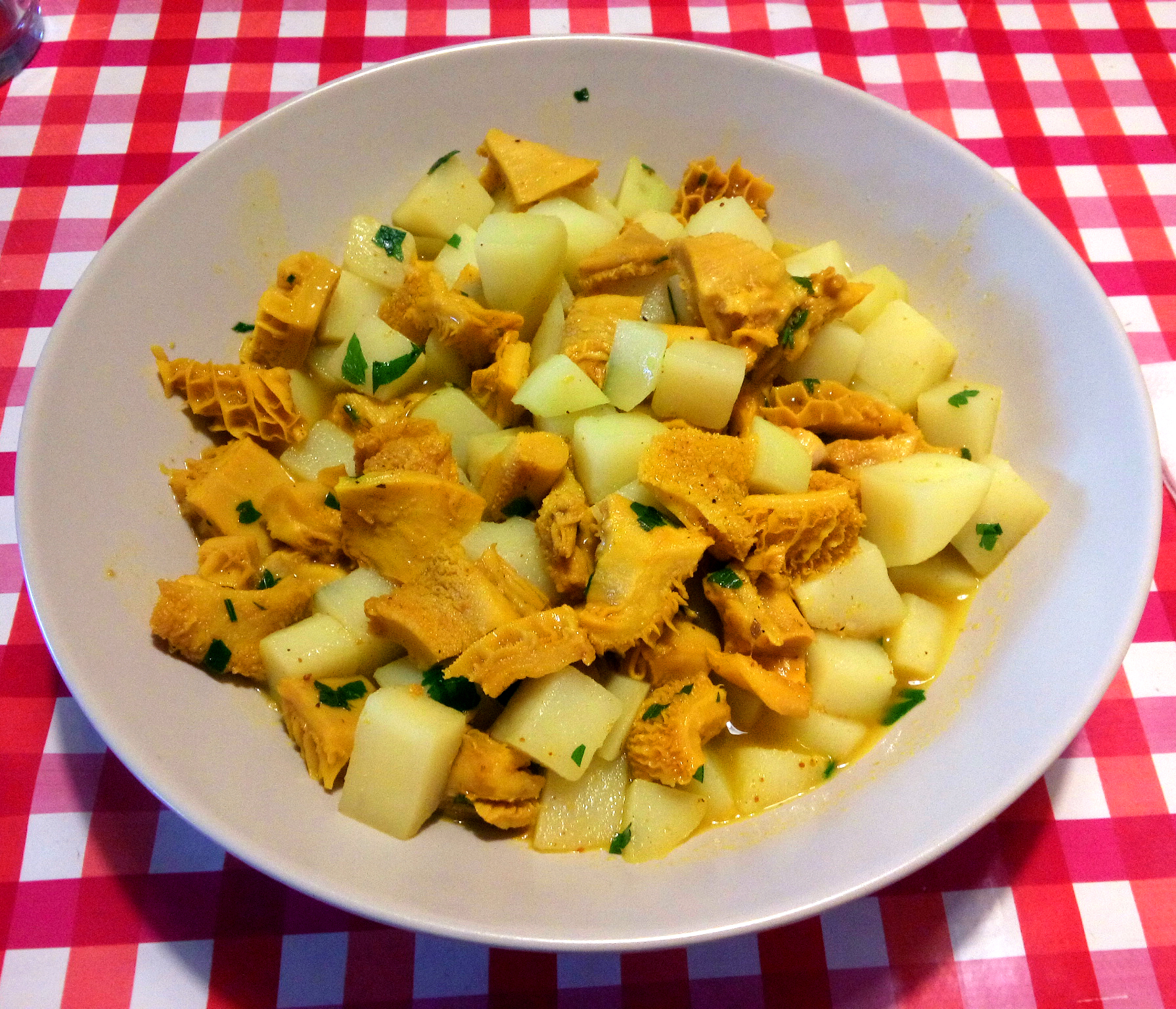
Cau cau

== East and Southeast Asia ==
In Chinese cuisine, Lanzhou-style lamian noodle soup is made with tripe.

In Indonesian cuisine, sekba or bektim is made using pork tripe and other offal. It is a Chinese-Indonesian dish.

In Filipino cuisine, sopa de mondongo is eaten.

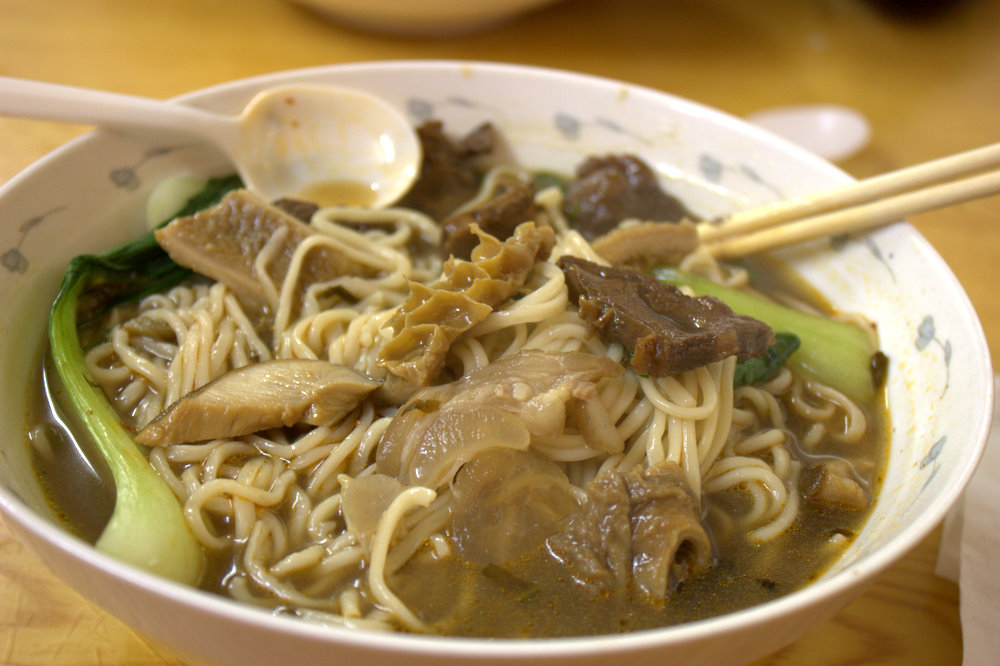
Lanzhou lamian featuring tripe

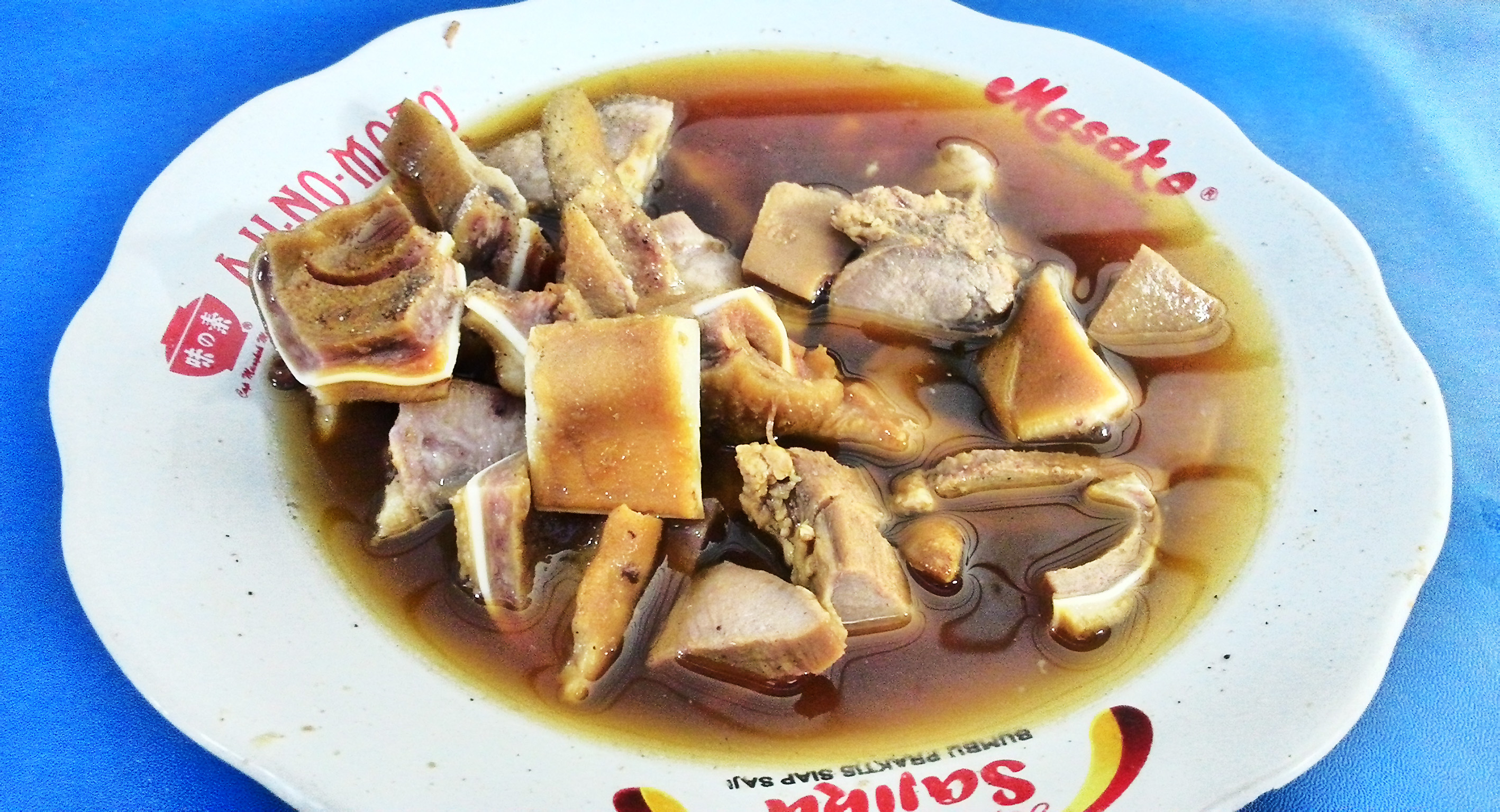
Sekba

== See also ==
- List of soups
