= Šumienkový zákusok =

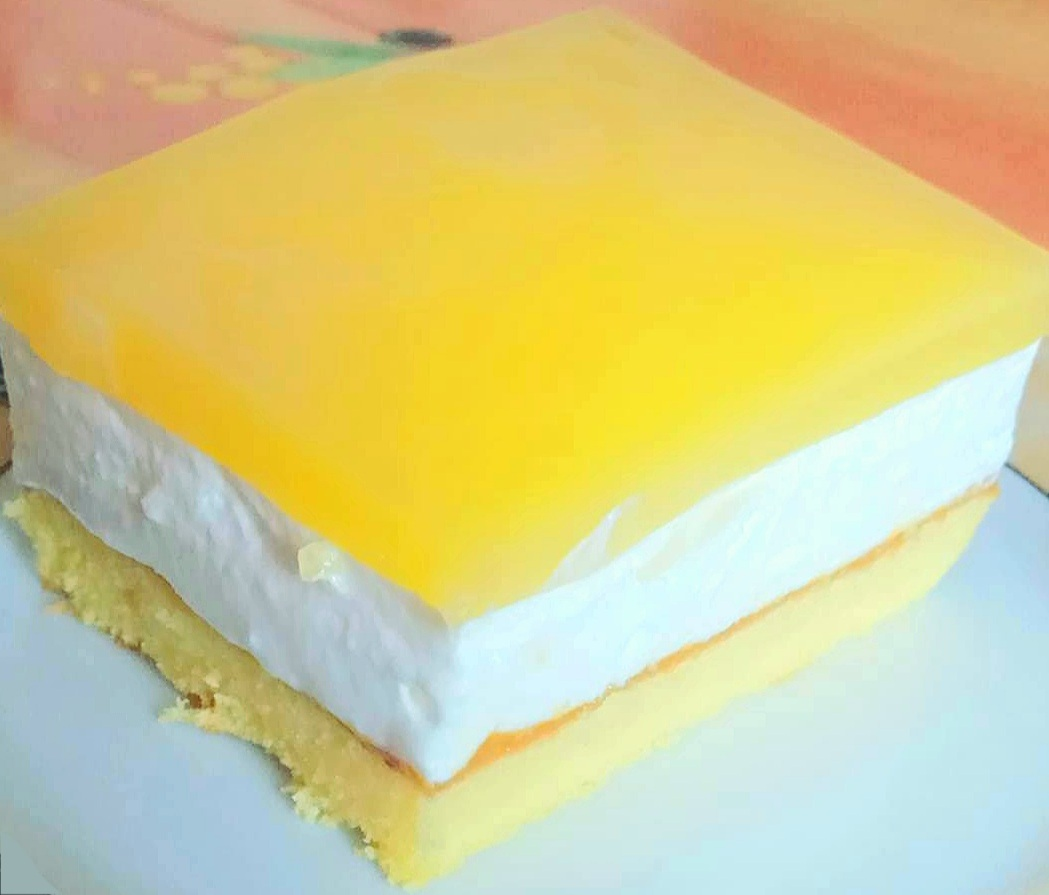
- Šumienkový zákusok with whipped cream
- Alternative names: šumienkový koláč, tvarohový koláč so želatínou, šumienkové rezy, šumienkové kocky (in Slovak) šumienkový zákusek, šumienkový koláč, šumienkové řezy, vitacitové řezy (in Czech)
- Course: dessert
- Place of origin: Slovakia; Czech Republic
- Main ingredients: sponge cake (eggs, oil, milk, powdered sugar, semi-coarse flour, baking powder), cream and citrus jelly
- Variations: with natural or cocoa sponge cake, with whipped cream or tvaroh cream, with of effervescent powder or instant drink jelly, with fruit compote

In Slovak and Czech cuisine, šumienkový zákusok (Slovak pronunciation: ['ʂumɪenkɔʋiː 'zaːkusɔk]) or zákusek (Czech pronunciation: ['ʃumɪɛnkoviː 'zaːkusɛk], English: 'effervescent powder dessert') (Note: Alternative names: šumienkový koláč ('effervescent powder cake'), tvarohový koláč so želatínou ('cheesecake with jelly'), šumienkové kocky ('effervescent powder cubes'), šumienkové rezy/řezy ('effervescent powder cuts'), vitacitové řezy ('Vitacit cuts')) is a summer dessert made from sponge cake (natural or cocoa), whipped cream o tvaroh cream and effervescent powder or instant drink jelly and cream in powder with vanilla flavor. Sometimes fruit compote is added.

== See also ==
- Fanta cake
