= Meter cake =

Long sponge cake

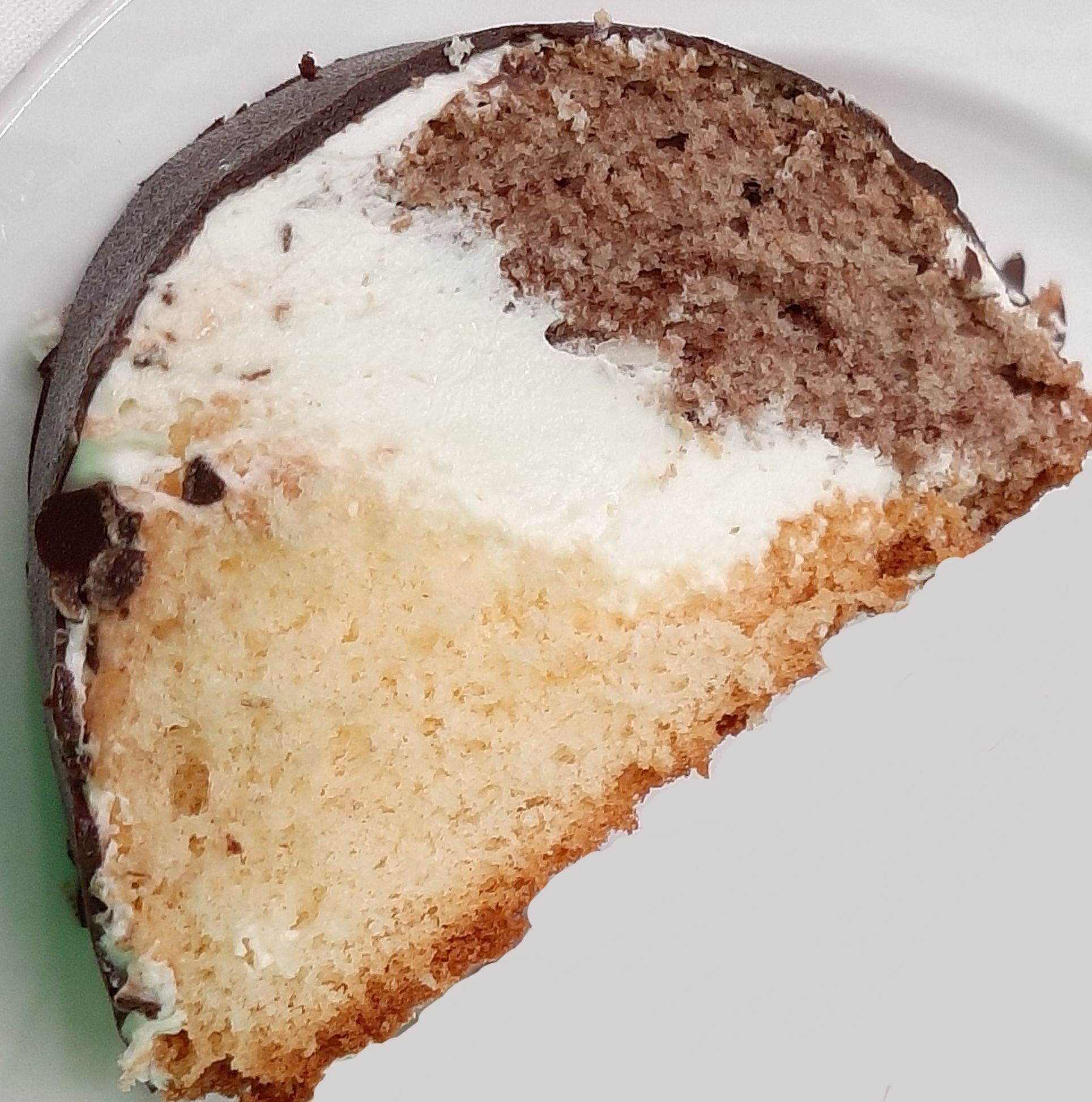
Meter cake

Meter cake or meter-long cake is a bicolor loaf-shaped cake made from yellow and brown sponge cake layered with buttercream or pudding and covered with a chocolate topping. It is baked in a baking tin in the shape of a "roe deer back" and served cut into slices.

The cake's name is often a hyperbole derived from its length, which is usually less than a meter, but ranks it among the longest baked cakes. A meter cake is traditionally served as a dessert during Christmas or Easter.

== Names in other countries ==
- Czech Republic and Slovakia: metrový koláč, metrová roláda (nickname: metrák), tunelový koláč
- Poland: metrowiec
- Hungary: méteres kalács
