= Tripe Marketing Board =

British online publication

The Tripe Marketing Board is a UK-based online publication which seeks to promote the consumption of tripe through the use of humour. The Los Angeles Times has described the group as an "internet and publishing phenomenon that may or may not be completely serious". It parodies defunct government organisations such as the milk and potato marketing boards.

== History ==
The group came to prominence in 2012 when it managed to persuade a number of serious media outlets that it was a real entity. The Mirror interviewed a tripe seller in Blackburn about the attempt to improve the public perception of tripe. Reporters at The Times newspaper investigated the board a number of days later, concluding that it was a 'very funny spoof'.

The Lancashire Life website explained that the Tripe Marketing Board had been created by the authors of a humorous guide called Forgotten Lancashire and Parts of Cheshire and the Wirral by Dr Derek J. Ripley, and had then been taken seriously by journalists.

It advocates the celebration of World Tripe Day on 24 October because in 1662 Samuel Pepys wrote on that day, "So home and dined there with my wife upon a most excellent dish of tripes of my own directing."

== See also ==
- Dobrada (food)
- Tripas
- Tripas à moda do Porto
