= Industries in the Maldives =

Industries in the Maldives center around fishing and tourism, with some overlap between the two with recreational fishing.

== Fishing ==
=== Pole and line fishing ===
Since prehistory, the method of fishing employed in the archipelago has been the pole and line method. The types of fish caught by this method are tuna, skipjack tuna, frigate and mackerel. The main catch is tuna, which is used in the daily diet of the inhabitants, as well as for export in different forms. The daily catch mainly depends on the seasons. Triangular sailed dhoni were used in the past, while mechanized fishing dhoanis are now used.

Traditionally, fishermen set out at dawn in search of bait fish, which were caught and kept alive in a specially prepared compartment of the dhoani. Eight or nine men did the actual fishing. The poles are short, are equipped with a line, and hook. During a favourable season, the catch can be as much as a thousand fish per dhoani per day. Traditionally, the fishermen return to the island by nightfall; however, with the advent of mechanized dhoani, they are generally back by the early afternoon. Skipjack tuna and yellowfin tuna are the most common species caught in Maldives.

=== Industrial fishing ===
Mechanization of the traditional sailing dhoani in 1974 changed the fishing industry of the Maldives. A new generation of dhoani, designed especially for mechanization, was introduced. A fish-canning factory was set up in 1977 as a joint venture with a Japanese company. However, when the government took over the plant in 1982, it was unable to meet the overseas demand due to the condition of buildings and equipment, so a new factory was opened in 1986. In 1979, Maldives Nippon Corporation was formed, in partnership with the Marubeni Corporation of Japan, to process and can fresh tuna. In the same year, the Maldives Fisheries Corporation (MFC) was formed to exploit the fish industry. The MFC later became the Fisheries Projects Implementation Department (FPID), which was transformed into MIFCO in 1993.

When the Japanese pulled out, the government negotiated a deal to buy the three freezer and six collector vessels that belonged to them, which then became part of the State Trading Organization (STO) fleet. However, by the time that STO inherited the Japanese fleet; the vessels were over twenty years old. A new fleet of vessels was acquired. Three mother ships were built in Korea and nine collector vessels were constructed in Malé. A boat yard was built on the island of Alifushi and the construction of one hundred second-generation Mark II dhoanis was begun. These dhoanis were sold to the fishermen on a lease-purchase basis. The opening up of the exclusive economic zone (EEZ), for fisheries proved to be a boon to the country's fishing industry.

=== Fish cannery ===
The first fish canning plant was established on the island of Felivaru, as a joint venture with a Japanese firm, in 1977. In 1982, the government took over the cannery, but the condition of the original buildings, equipment seriously limited production, and the cannery was not able to meet the increasing demand of an expanding overseas market. In 1987, a new cannery and cooling/freezing plant opened. The work was done by the NORAD project (Norwegians and Englishmen). The Norwegians built the buildings, while the Englishmen worked the unsteady ground underneath. The plant was fully opened between September and October 1987. The new Felivaru Tuna Processing Plant has its own electricity, a desalination plant, water storage tanks and an ice making plant. While this 150,000 cans per hour plant increased production, it was still unable to meet the rising overseas demand for Maldive tuna.

== Tourism ==
=== Development ===
Tourism was introduced to the Maldives in the early 1970s. The first two resort islands had a capacity of 280 beds. The first tourists arrived mostly as individuals or small groups. Soon, Maldives began to be recognized as an international tourist destination.

In 1972, the first tourist resort, Kurumba Village, was pioneered by two Maldivian entrepreneurs in association with an Italian investor. A second resort was opened the same year on the island of Bandos. Despite conditions of facilities and services, 1,096 tourist arrivals were recorded that year.

At the start, the country's tourism and its development was for the most part dependent on private initiative. In 1979, the tourism law was enacted, requiring all foreign investments to be registered at the Department of Tourism and Foreign Investment. A tourism plan was formulated in 1983, creating guidelines for the overall development of tourism, and identifying tourism zones in different parts of the country. In 1984, the tourism advisory board was created. The department of tourism was upgraded to a ministry in 1988.

The opening of Malé International Airport in 1981 was a milestone in the travel business. At the early stages, tourism in Maldives was a seasonal industry. As the country opened up further, this seasonal nature of tourism changed. In the early 21st century tourist arrivals were recorded throughout the year. During 1987, a school of hotel and catering was established to meet the manpower requirements of the industry. Both government and private sector provide overseas training to those employed in the industry.

The private sector and the government are actively involved in the promotion and marketing of the tourism product. Maldives is represented in all major international travel fairs by both the government and the private operators. The tourist information counter at the Malé International Airport hands out leaflets and other information about the country. The Tourist Information Unit was formed in 1989 to further disseminate information.

The development of tourism has fostered the overall growth of the country's economy. It has created direct and indirect employment and income generation opportunities in other related industries. Today, tourism is the country's biggest foreign exchange earner, contributing nearly a fifth of the GDP.

With 86 tourist resorts in operation, the year 2000 recorded 467,154 tourist arrivals.

=== Tourist facilities ===
Each tourist resort is situated on an uninhabited island. The islands are self-contained, with its own electricity, water and waste disposal facilities. The islands are developed according to the standards and guidelines set by the Ministry of Tourism. While all modern facilities are available, the islands retain its unique natural beauty. The designs feature local architectural concepts as well as international style. A variety of services and facilities are available to guests, to make visits comfortable, pleasant and memorable.

=== Maldives Tourism Promotion Board ===
The Maldives Tourism Promotion Board was established by the government to promote quality and sustainable growth in the country's tourism industry and to foster a well used and financially healthy private sector industry. – in this way enabling the industry to deliver long-term economic, social and cultural benefits to the people of Maldives, while at the same time contributing to enhancements in Maldives’ marine environment to the benefit of the people and visitors of the Maldives.

=== MATI ===
Maldives Association of Tourism Industry (MATI) is a non-profit non-governmental organization working towards the sustainable development of the country's tourism industry. Its membership is open to those engaged in the travel trade business. MATI coordinates its activities with the government and work in partnership with other national and international organizations.

== See also ==
- Fishing industry in the Maldives
- Economy of the Maldives
