= Fishing industry in the Maldives =

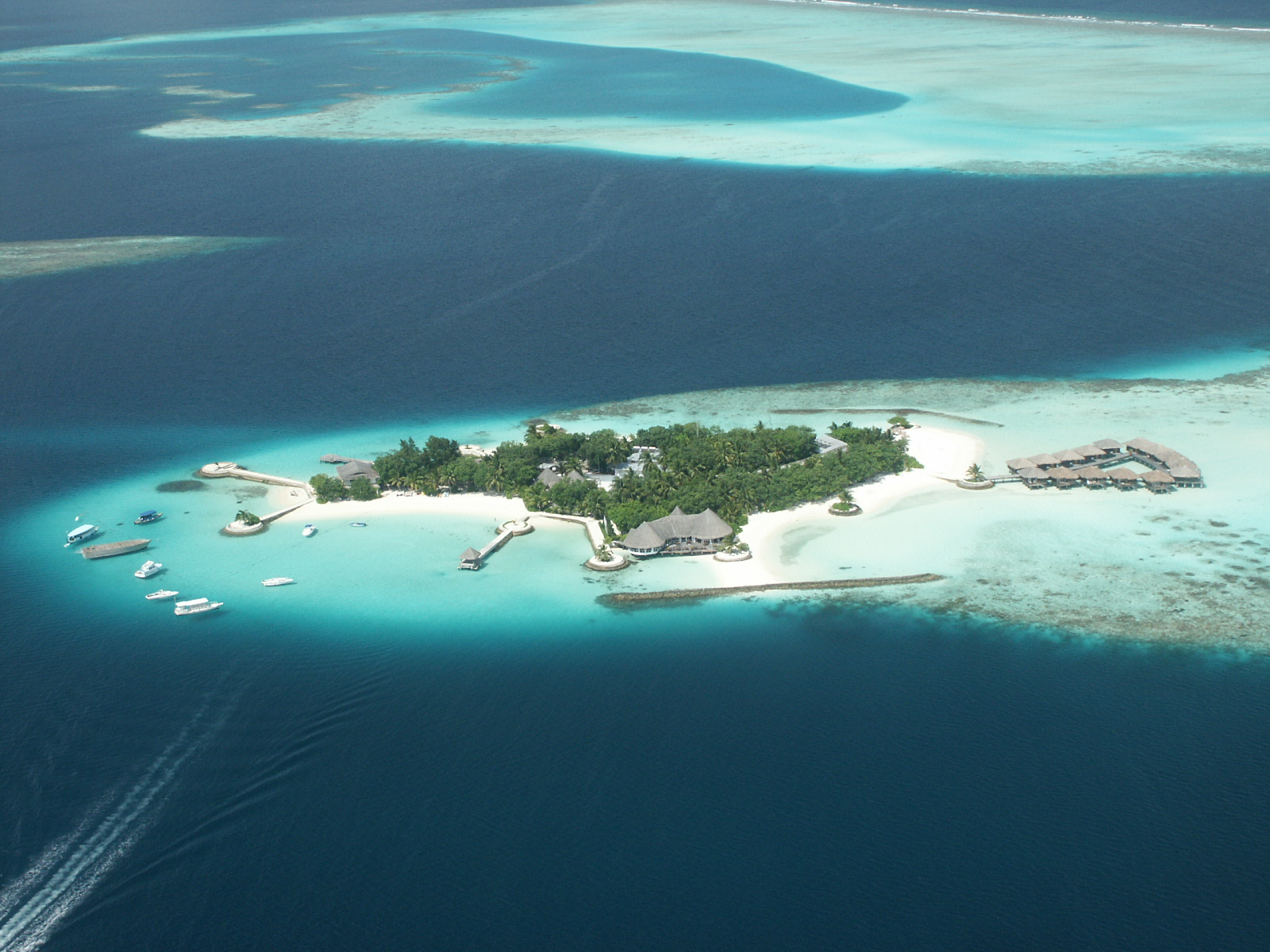
- Bolifushi in Kaafu Atoll is one of 1,190 islands in the Maldives.

General characteristics
- Coastline: 640 km (400 mi)
- EEZ area: 923,000 km^{2} (356,000 sq mi)
- EEZ PP: 387 mg or 5.97 gr C/m²/day
- Shelf area: 35,000 km^{2} (14,000 sq mi)
- Land area: 300 km^{2} (120 sq mi)
- Employment: Full-time: 22,000 (1996); Part-time: 5,000 (1996)
- Fishing fleet: 1,674 vessels, nearly all motorised (1995)
- Export value: US$56 million (1997)
- Import value: nil

Harvest
- Wild marine: 184,158 tonnes (202,999 tons) (2006)
- Aquaculture total: nil

The fishing industry in the Maldives is the island's second main industry. According to national tradition in the words of former President Maumoon Abdul Gayoom, "Fishing is the lifeblood of our nation, it is inborn. From the soil on which we live, to the sea around us, it remains an integral part of our existence. Fishing, and our country and its people, [are] one and shall remain inseparable forever." The Maldives has an abundance of aquatic life and species of fish. Common are tuna, groupers, dolphin fish, barracuda, rainbow runner, trevally and squirrelfish and many more. Aside from being of essential importance to the economy, fishing is also a popular recreational activity in the Maldives, not only among locals but by tourists. The islands have numerous fishing resorts which cater for these activities.

The Maldives is an archipelago in the Indian Ocean, located southwest of the southern tip of India. Its population in 2008 was 386,000. There are twenty-six atolls containing 1,192 islets, of which two hundred and fifty islands are inhabited. The low level of islands makes them vulnerable to sea level rises.

== History ==
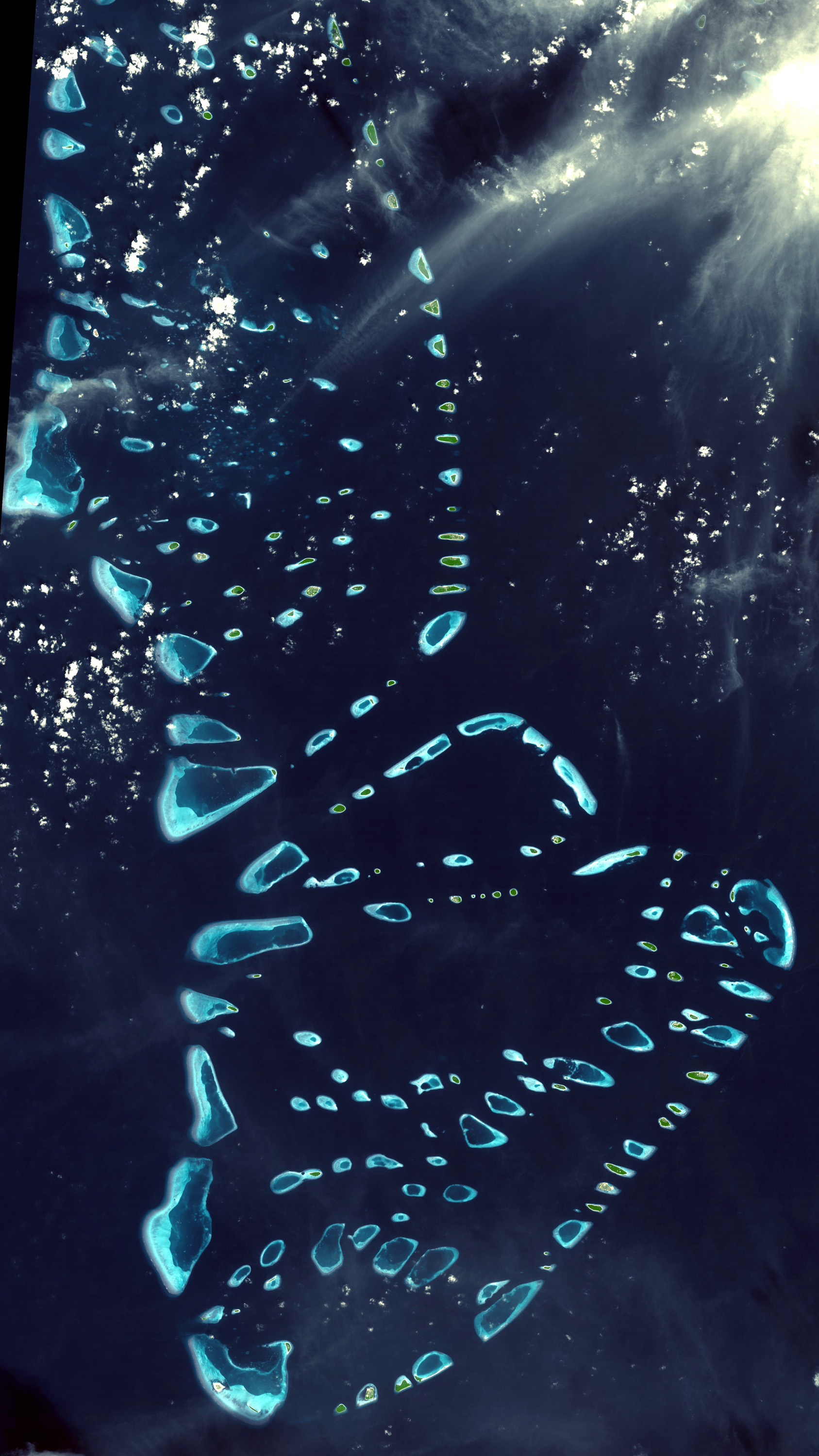
The Maldives is a chain of 1190 small coral islands, grouped into 26 atolls

Fishing has long been the life blood of the Maldivian economy. Today it still employs half the Maldivian workforce. Formerly, Maldives shipped 90 per cent of its fishing catch of tuna in dried form to Sri Lanka. However, because Sri Lanka cut back its imports of such fish, in 1979 Maldives joined with the Japanese Marubeni Corporation to form the Maldives Nippon Corporation that canned and processed fresh fish. Also in 1979 the Maldivian government created the Maldives Industrial Fisheries Company. This company controls the processing and exporting of frozen and canned tuna. They also provide a collector vessel. All fishing is undertaken by the private sector and its involvement in processing and export is increasing.

Progress has also been made as a result of fisheries development projects undertaken by the World Bank. Harbour and refrigeration facilities have been improved, leading to a fourfold increase in earnings from canned fish between 1983 and 1985. Further construction of fisheries refrigeration installations and related facilities such as collector vessels were underway in 1994, with funding both from Japan and the World Bank.

The tiny, low-lying islands have an average elevation of a few feet above sea level. The highest elevation of any island is not more than three and a half meters. Although the Maldives were in the direct path of the 2004 Indian Ocean tsunami, little permanent damage resulted to the coral beds and fishing grounds.

The mainstays of the Maldives economy are its fisheries and tourism. Both are intrinsically related to the coral reefs. The fisheries were the dominant sector of the economy until 1985, when the tourism industry overtook the fisheries in terms of its contribution to GDP. However fisheries continue to provide an important source of income for about 20 per cent of the population, with about 22,000 individuals involved in full-time fishing activities.

== Statistics ==
External images
- Value of catch by gear used
- Value of catch by species
- Mean tropic level
- Primary production
- Primary production used

The following table shows the total volume of aquatic species caught in the Maldives, as reported by the FAO, for all commercial, industrial, recreational and subsistence purposes.

Total catch
Year	1960	1970	1980	1990	2000	2006
Tonnes	13,000	37,273	38,624	78,733	118,963	184,158

Fisheries data in tons wet weight
1996	Production	Imports	Exports	Food supply	Per capita kg/year
Fish for direct human consumption	103,500	nil	57,200	46,300	176
Fish for animal feed etc.	2,100		2,100		

Almost half of the catch is consumed locally.

== EEZ ==
Corals (tan and purple) settle and grow around an oceanic island, forming a fringing reef. The interior island subsides, eventually disappearing beneath the water, leaving a ring of still growing coral with an open lagoon in its centre. This process of atoll formation can take as long as 30 million years.

As with other countries, the Maldivian 200-nautical-mile (370 km) exclusive economic zone (EEZ) gives its fishing industry special fishing rights. It covers about 900,000 square kilometres. This area, plus the inland areas, are the areas which the Maldives can, under international law, regard as its fishing grounds.

For most coastal countries, the EEZ roughly coincides with the continental shelf, the fishing rich area of relatively shallow water, less than 200 metres deep, that extends from most continental coastlines. The EEZ gives fishing and mineral rights to this shelf. In the case of the Madives, there is no continental shelf, since the Maldives are not part of a continent. The coral atoll equivalent of a continental shelf is the shallow coral floors surrounding the islands and within the coral basins and lagoons. The total land (not immersed) area of the islands is about 300 km^{2}, and the total coral shelf area is about 35,000 km^{2}.

This shelf area is large compared to the land area (120 times larger), but still small compared to deep ocean part of the Maldivian EEZ (30 times smaller).

There are four areas in the Maldives where fisheries can operate.

- Land areas: The islands in the Maldives are too small to have inland lakes and rivers, so there are no inland fisheries. Nor have there been any land based aquaculture activities to date.
- Coral lagoons: Many of the islands in the Maldives have subsided, leaving lagoons wholly or partially enclosed by a ring of coral (see diagrams below right). These lagoons teem with reef fish and other aquatic life.
- The outer coral shelf: which slopes away steeply, and does not offer as rich fishing grounds as the inner lagoons do.
- Deep ocean: which is by far the largest part of the Maldivian EEZ. This area is inhabited by pelagic fish, small schooling forage fish, sometimes called bait fish, and larger fish who prey on them, such as tuna and shark. By far, the greatest volume of catch in the Maldives comes from this area.

== Bait fisheries ==
Different types of bait fishing are used in Maldives. Most common method is night time using lights.

== Reef fisheries ==
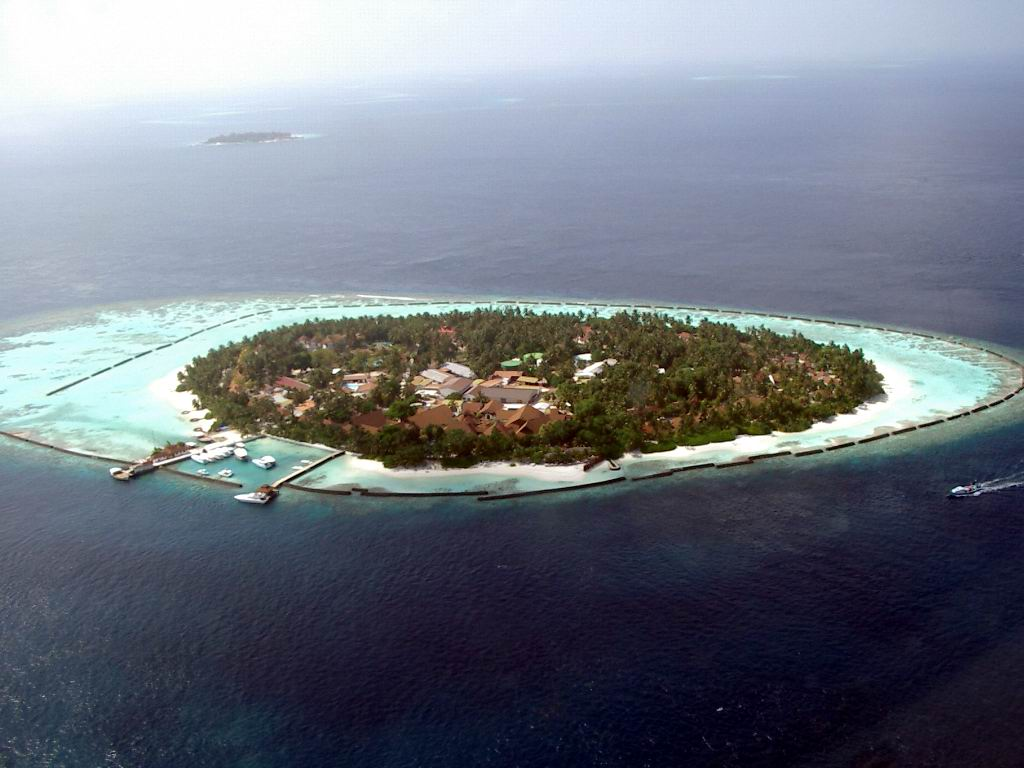
Island, subsiding asymmetrically within its fringing reef in the Maldives

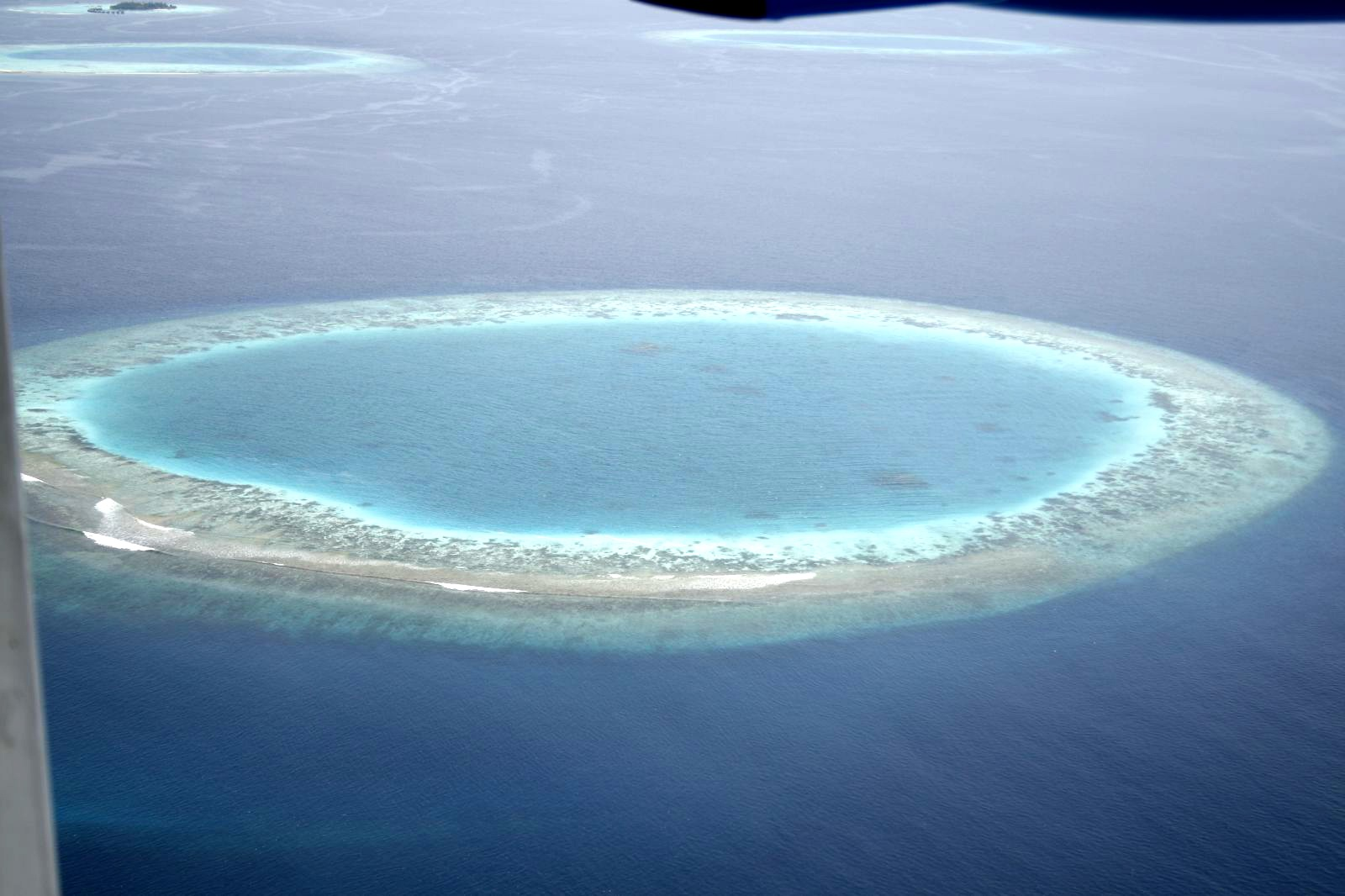
Subsided island leaves a coral lagoon in the Maldives

Reef fisheries are fisheries for reef fish and other organisms that live among coral reefs. The Maldives contain 2.86 per cent of the world coral reefs. The FAO estimated in 1992 that a sustainable yield of about 30,000 tonnes per year was possible for commercial reef fish. The atoll basins, which are by far the largest part of the Maldivian atolls, were identified as having large reef fish resources. Outside the atolls, the deep reef slopes support some high value species, but their total potential yield is relatively small.

Larger commercial reef fish, such as medium to large snapper, grouper, emperor and reef associated jack, are best caught by handlines and longlines. Other resources include aquarium fish, and non invertebrates, such as sea cucumber, lobster, giant clam and black coral. An increase in demand for reef fish from the tourism industry and overseas markets has raised the level of exploitation of particular reef fish varieties.

In terms of value, grouper have been the most significant component of the reef fishery. The grouper fishery has also come under pressure due to demand from local tourism and international markets. The grouper fishery has been sustainable so far, but there is very little potential for expansion under current practices, and a strict management regime is required.

Exports of aquarium fish from the Maldives is increasing. Currently, about 100 species of fish are exported, with 20 species comprising over 75 per cent of the trade. Some species exported are rare in the Maldives, and are vulnerable to overexploitation. Cyanide fishing is occasionally practised in the Maldives to capture aquarium fish.

Shark have been fished for centuries in the Maldives. The main groups of sharks caught in the Maldives are reef sharks, deep water gulper sharks and ocean sharks. The reef shark fishery generates more revenue for the fisheries and tourism than the other groups. Shark fisheries continue to be exploited, particularly for export purposes.

The lobster fishery is mainly targeted for the local tourist industry.

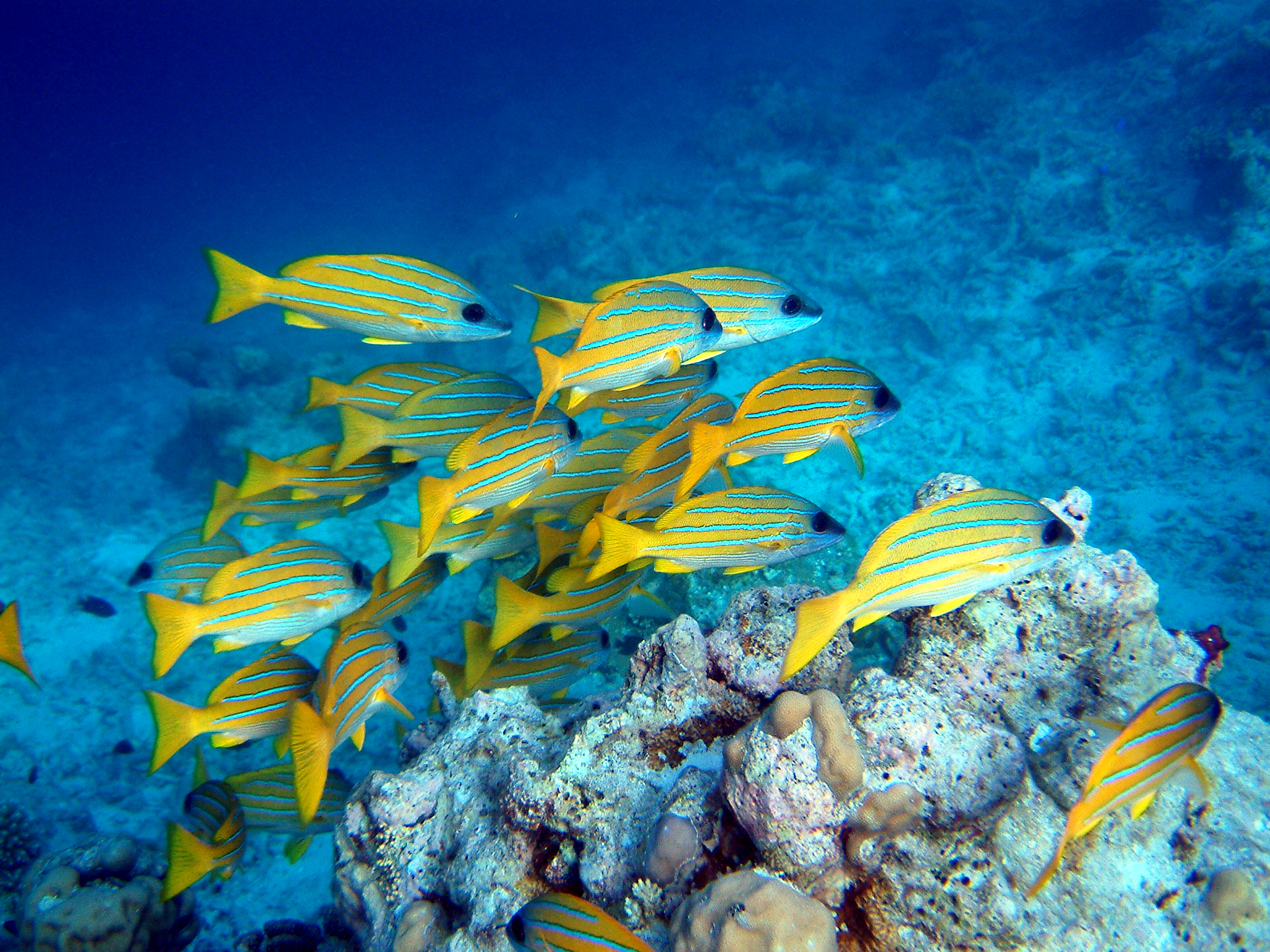
Schooling bluestripe snapper, Lutjanus kasmira, in the Maldives

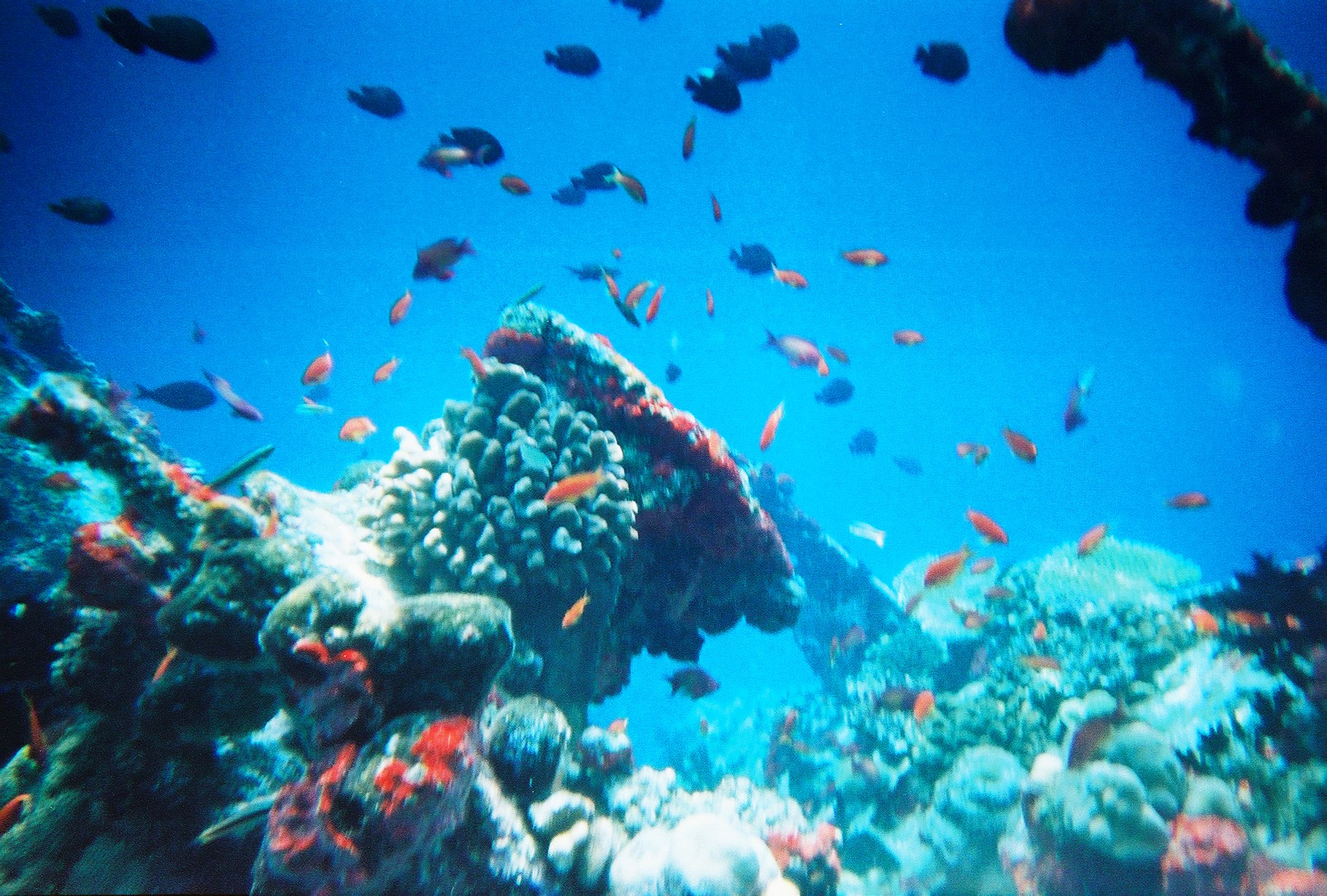
Maldives rich marine life.

Red coral has been harvested from reef beds for centuries, and the market for them is increasing. In the absence of adequate controls and monitoring, it is difficult to estimate how many people or areas are engaged in exploiting red coral.

Other coastal resources such as cowrie and cuttlefish play a nominal role, and can be sustainably exploited at the present level. However, resources that can be cultured such as giant clams, sea cucumber, some species of aquarium fish, and turtles, have considerable potential.

== Pelagic fisheries ==
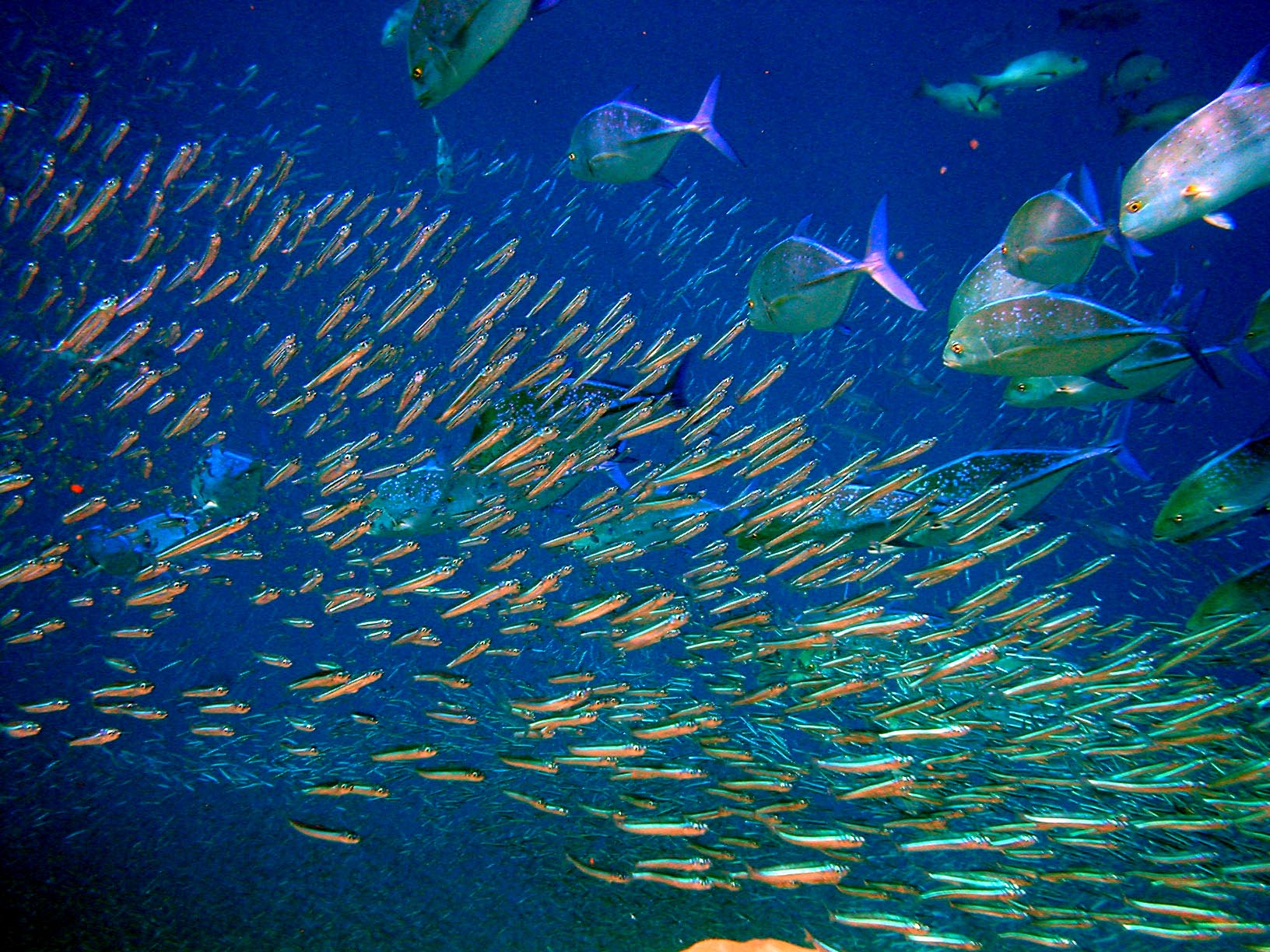
Bluefin trevally sizing up schooling anchovies, in the Maldives

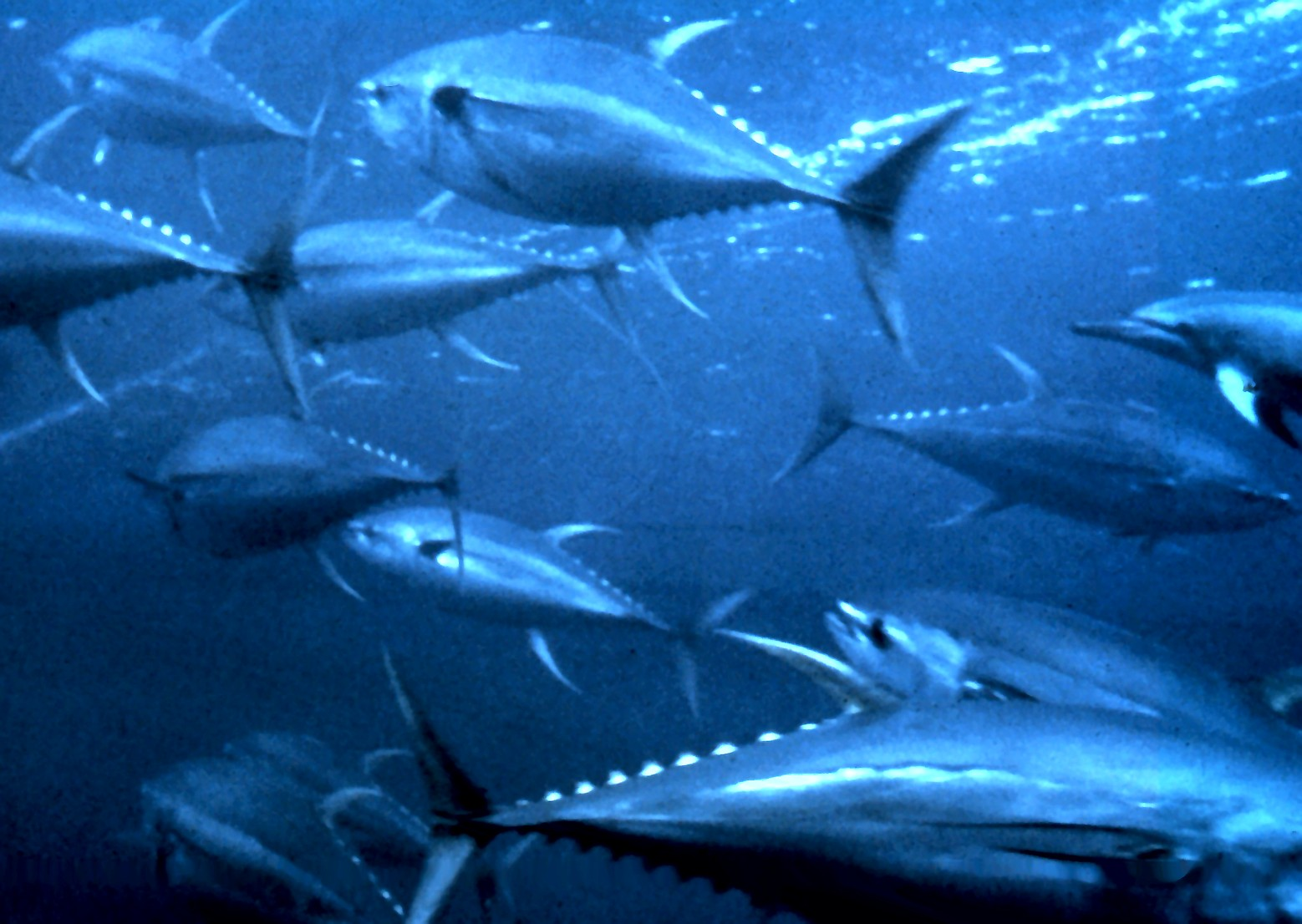
Yellowfin tuna

Pelagic fisheries are fisheries for pelagic fish, that is, for fish that are offshore in the open ocean, such as small schooling forage fish, sometimes called bait fish, and larger fish who prey on them, such as tuna and ocean sharks.

The major fishery in the Maldives is the tuna fishery. The most important tuna species is the skipjack tuna, although they are coming under increasing pressure. Next most important, in terms of fish exports from the Maldives, is the large yellowfin tuna.

The tuna are caught by the following methods: pole and line, handline and longline. The pole and line method is most commonly used, and results in 65% of skipjack tuna fishing and 55% of yellowfin tuna. This traditional use of the pole and line method in the Maldivian tuna industry has contributed to the sustainability of the tuna resources. With recent further improvements in fishing gear and methods, it appears that the catch levels may be close to the maximum sustainable yield.

However, an even more extensive and sustainable coastal resource is forage fish, such as anchovies and herring. This fishery is an integral part of the pole and line tuna fishery, since tuna feed on the forage fish. Future development of the traditional pole and line tuna fishery depends on the availability of this bait fishery. Catch rate for forage fish have increased greatly in recent years, but there is not enough data to really know what the current status of the forage fish stocks are.

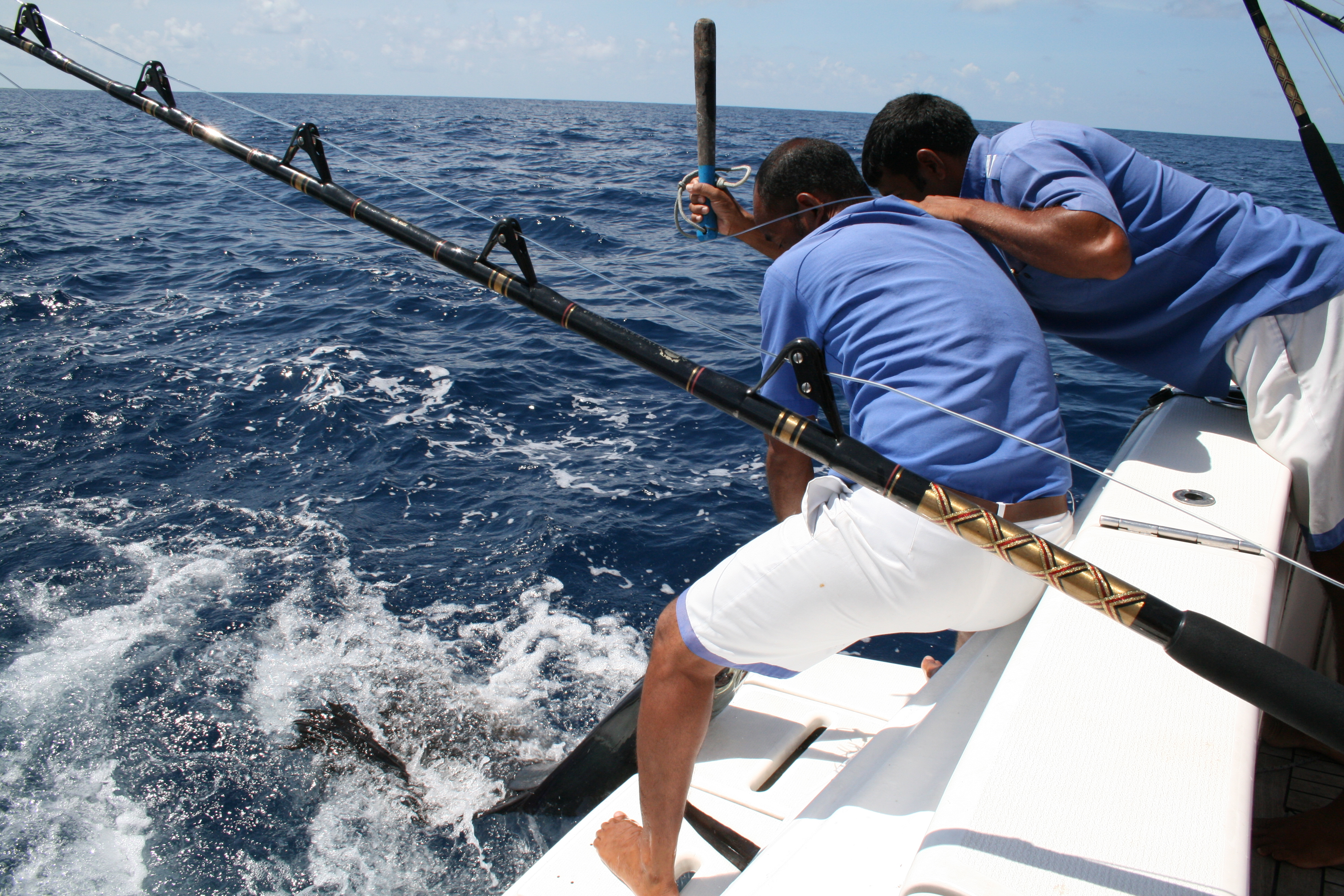
Maldivian fishermen using The pole and line method.

For poles, Maldivian fishermen use a bamboo or plastic construction pole, typically 10 to 15 feet (4.6 m) in length and capable of handling a fish weighing as much as 50 lb (23 kg), with a line and a feathered barb-less hook attached to the smaller end of the pole. The fishermen will go out at the start of a fishing day in their dhoni boats, looking for live bait such as small scads, silver side and sardine, which are kept alive by the specialised fresh seawater circulating system of the dhoni. With bait on board they then go out looking for schools of tuna.

However a variety of different types of fishing are practised in the Maldives. Very popular is evening fishing just before the sunset. Recreational fishing is seasonal, dictated to by the monsoons. Big game fishing is particularly popular with tourists who will go out on boats with local fishermen and catch big game for sport.

== Mariculture ==
Mariculture is the culture of marine organisms in seawater. The islands in the Maldives are too small to have inland fisheries, nor are there land based aquaculture activities at present. Fishing occurs in reef, coastal and offshore waters. However, various forms of mariculture are being experimentally trialled, such as the culture of pearls, giant clams, spiny lobsters, bêche-de-mer and grouper.

Seaweed culture has been trialled with little success so far. Nonetheless, culture appears promising given the extensive reef areas which can provide suitable habitats. Culturing crabs in mangrove areas is also a possibility.

Sea cucumbers have been an important coastal resource. They were a very successful fishery to begin with, but have been overfished and need appropriate management to recover. Cultured sea cucumbers have considerable potential, although forage and grouper fisheries can be negatively affected by waste water from sea cucumbers.

== Marketing ==
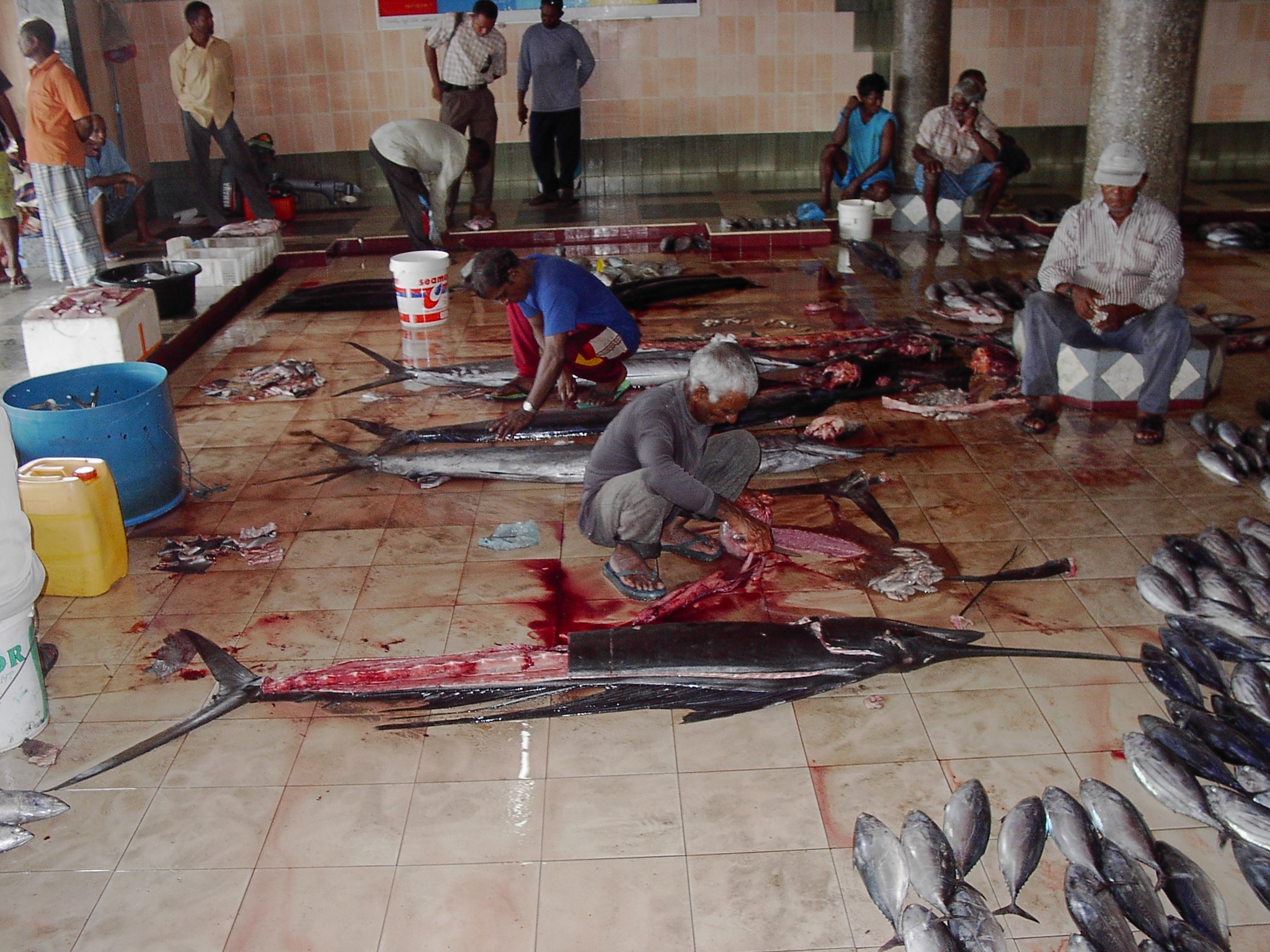
A Fish Market in Malé

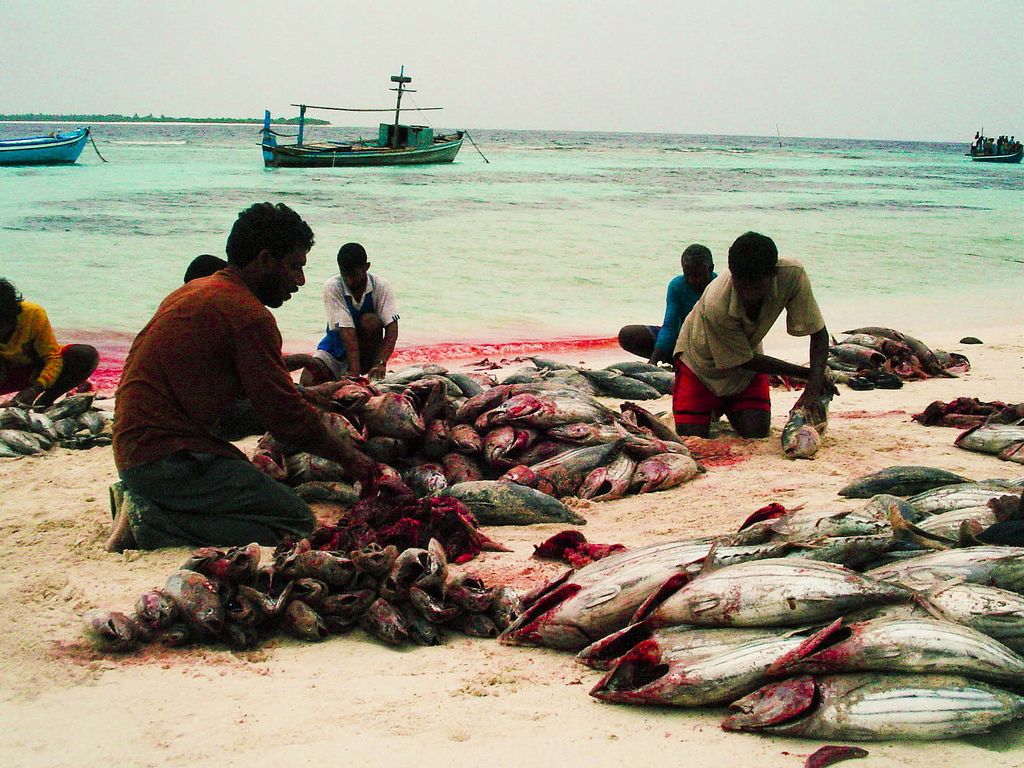
Local fishermen sorting their catch

The capital of the Maldives, Malé is known for its busy fish markets. Fish is an integral part of the Maldivian diet and it is a common sight to see office workers in formal white shirts and ties on bicycles after work taking skipjack home to eat. Trolleys packed full of fresh tuna or skipjack are carted around in door to door sales. Tuna however is the most important fish, and in recent years in the Maldives the industry has become more efficient, using tuna waste and residue to be processed into fishmeal, an animal food supplement, further contributing to the economy. The tuna industry in the Maldives has been greatly helped by The State Trading Organisation which rebuilt the efficient tuna cannery plant on the island of Felivaru. The canning process typically takes four days, and the plant has the benefits of modern technology and even a laboratory for research and quality control.

== Fishing fleet ==
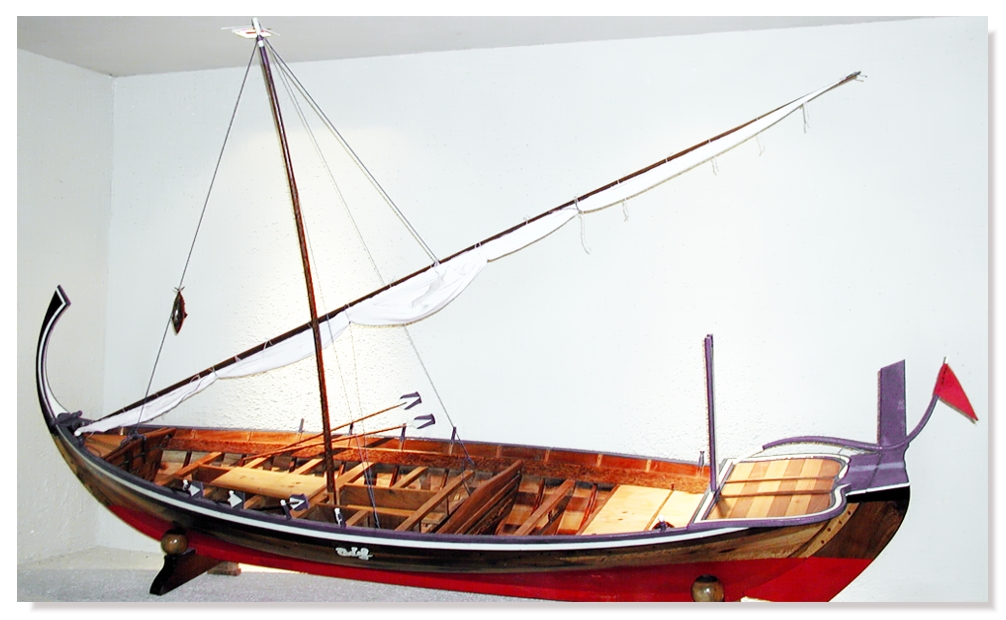
Dhonis are the traditional fishing boat of the Maldives.

The islands of the Maldives have an extensive fleet of small fishing boats, built domestically, each of which can carry about eight to twelve persons. These boats are called dhonis.

In 1995 there were 1,674 vessels, of which motorised vessels for coastal pole and line tuna fishing accounted for 1,407 vessels. Of the remainder, 5 were sailing dhoni (masdhoni), 48 were mechanised dhoni (vadhudhoni), 209 were vadhudhoni with sails, and 5 were rowing boats used to troll reef waters.

Based on a US$3.2 million loan from the International Development Association(IDA), most of the boats were mechanised in the course of the 1980s. Although the addition of motors increased fuel costs, it resulted in doubling the fishing catch between 1982 and 1985. Moreover, the 1992 catch of 82,000 tons set a record; for example, in 1987 the catch was 56,900 tons.

The dhoni, which with its variants, makes up almost the entire fleet, is a small open boat traditionally built from coconut wood, although wood imported from Southeast Asia and fibreglass is increasingly used. Originally sailing craft, nowadays these boats are usually fitted with motors. The main site for building dhonis is in Alifushi Raa Atoll. This boat building is a traditional craft in the Maldives, and young apprentices are still trained by skilled craftsmen. Boats crafted from timber take about 60 days to complete.

== Issues ==
Overfishing has occurred for

- Black corals – These were presumably once abundant on Maldivian reefs. Over the last two decades large quantities were removed, and they are now protected.
- Giant clams – The giant clam fishery was very short-lived, lasting about a year from 1990. This exploitation of the giant clam was very destructive to the reefs and the government banned the fishery in 1991.
- Turtles – Turtles have been exploited for local trade and consumption for hundreds of years. They were further exploited to provide curios for the tourists. A moratorium on catching turtles has been in force since 1995.
- Sea cucumbers – The most popular species of sea cucumbers have been overexploited, resulting in near collapse of the fishery in 1997.

Environmental issues include marine pollution. Examples are increasing risks of spills from oil tankers, and industrial discharges from countries to the north, such as organochlorine residues such as DDT, and heavy metals such as mercury, cadmium, lead, and arsenic. Certain destructive methods used when fish aggregating can cause irreversible damage to the coral reefs, as can boats dropping anchors. Toxic household chemicals have been used when forage fishing. There has been a loss of coastal habitats associated with dredging harbours, reclamation, and the mining of coral and sand for construction. This has affected seagrass beds, mangroves and coral reefs. The significance of mangroves areas to the coastal and marine fishery has not been adequately studied.

Outside aid programmes have initiated reef monitoring projects in the Maldives. However, monitoring has been discontinued when projects have finished, and little of this information has been used to inform decision-making. The Maldives needs to maintain continuity in monitoring, and coordinate its approach to managing its reefs.

== Prospects ==
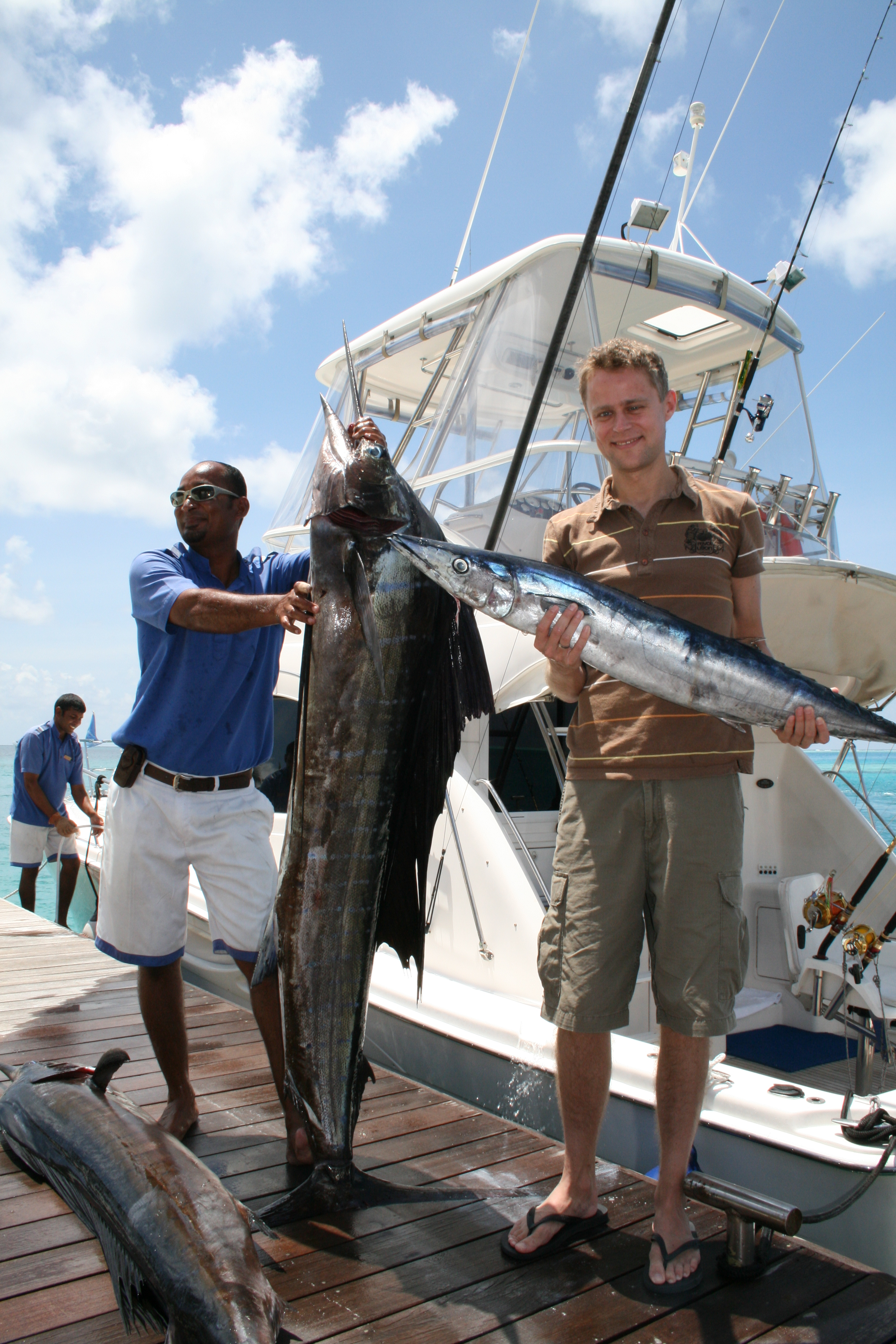
Tourist fishing in the Maldives

Factors which have contributed to increasing catches of fish include an increasing number of mechanised and motorised boats, installation of fish aggregating devices which improve the efficiency of fishing activities, and improvements in infrastructure for collecting and handling the fish catch. Of the pelagic species, skipjack tuna has been almost exclusively exploited. The pelagic fisheries may have considerable expansion potential, especially further from the coast, targeting species such as yellowfin. Demersal and reef species can also be exploited at higher levels. At present, development is limited by limited local facilities for storing and transporting fish.

Future prospects are partly a matter of the quality of fisheries research and management. Research is coordinated and carried out by the government run Marine Research Centre. The FAO Bay of Bengal Programme is exploring the reef and tuna fish, and facilitating a fisheries management system. The United Kingdom is helping investigations into the recovery of coral reefs, the status of tuna stocks, and possibilities for coral mining and further fish marketing. Canada is helping research into coral reefs and the implementation of marine surveillance facilities.

== See also ==
- Industries in Maldives
- Economic aid to Maldives
- Tourism in the Maldives
- Economy of the Maldives

== Notes ==
This article incorporates public domain text form the Library of Congress
