= Ontario Pork Producers' Marketing Board =

Ontario Pork Producers' Marketing Board (OPPMB or Ontario Pork), is the marketing board which represents the about 1700 producers who market hogs in the province of Ontario. The office has been located in Guelph, Ontario since moving there from Etobicoke in 2001.

== Purpose ==
Ontario Pork represents pork producers in many areas, including consumer education, research, government representation, environmental issues, animal care and food quality assurance. The organization is also responsible for arranging for payment of hogs and, working cooperatively with the processors, arranging the trucking. Ontario Pork acts as the official spokes-group for the industry and is a source of information about the industry.

Under Ontario's Farm Products Marketing Act and Regulation 419-1990, Ontario Pork has the legal right to control the marketing and transportation of market hogs produced in Ontario. All market hogs must be purchased through the board and producers are charged a service fee for every market hog sold. There are no quotas in hog production and producers are free to ship as many hogs as they wish. The regulations do not cover breeding stock or feeder pigs.

Following lobbying from producers for a more open marketing system, in 2006, Ontario Pork announced that it will provide consultation on the issue to get input from producers and other industry stakeholders. On May 13, 2010, the Ministry of Agriculture, Food and Rural Affairs permitted the sale of hogs directly to buyers or through an intermediary.

== History ==
The Ontario Pork Producers’ Marketing Board was formed in 1946 after a vote of hog producers in 1945 showed an overwhelming majority of producers in Ontario favoured a producer-controlled organization. The provincial government enacted the Ontario Hog Marketing Scheme - 1946 under the Farm Products Control Act, now called the Farm Products Marketing Act.

== Activities ==
A two-year, $3-million advertising campaign undertaken between 2002 and 2004 was credited with improving public opinion of hog farmers in Ontario. The approval rating of pork producers was at an all-time low of 46% at the start of 2002, prior to the campaign and increased to 59% by mid-March, 2004, according to the polling firm, Ipsos-Reid.

Ontario Pork funded a University of Guelph research project to genetically alter pigs to better metabolize phytate, which will reduce the amount of phosphorus in their feces and thereby reduce pollution that makes its way into rivers, lakes, and streams.
