= Dobrada (food) =

Traditional Portuguese and Brazilian dish

The word "dobradinha" (from the Portuguese word "dobro" which means double) is also used in Portugal for the achievement known as double in association football.

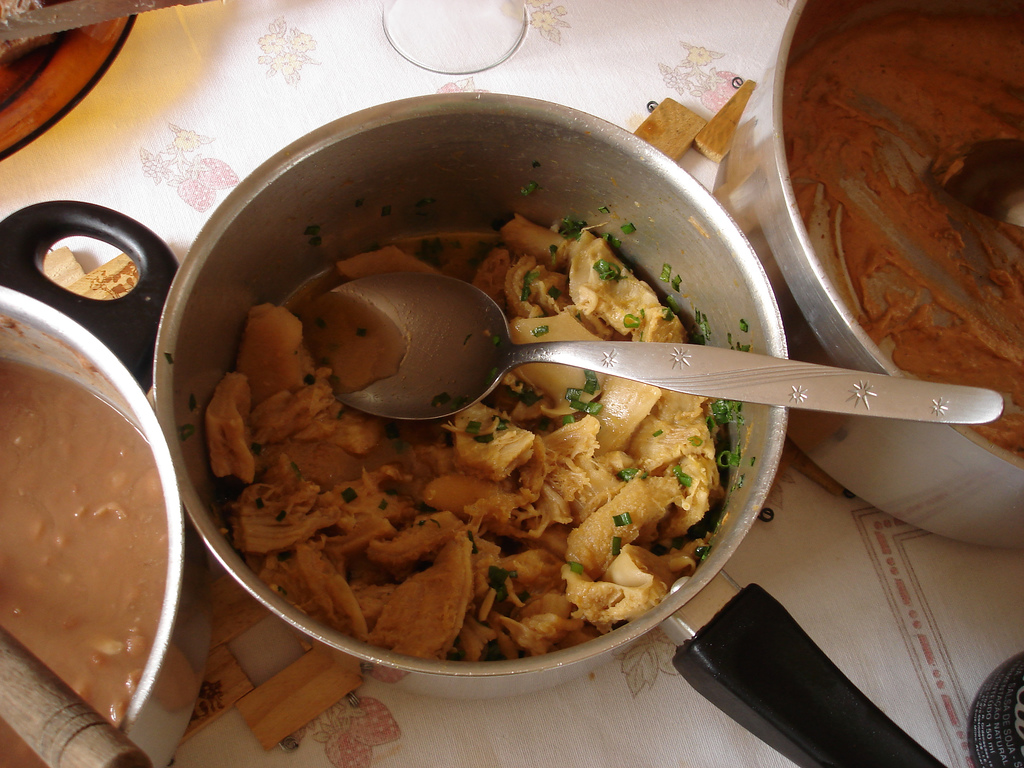
Dobradinha

Dobradinha is a traditional Portuguese dish made from a cow's flat white stomach lining commonly flavoured with paprika, tomato paste, onion, garlic, clove and red pepper paste. Usually, decorated with parsley. Sliced carrots and butter beans are essential as well. White rice is often served alongside this dish, especially in the city of Porto where it is called tripas à moda do Porto In reference to the historical events of the Iberian invasions, where the men of Porto went to fight and also took all the meat that the city produced, leaving behind only the women and the intestines of the cows. Therefore, to combat hunger, the women used these parts to invent a new recipe and avoid starvation. In Brazil the dish is a heritage from the Portuguese culture.

== Origin ==
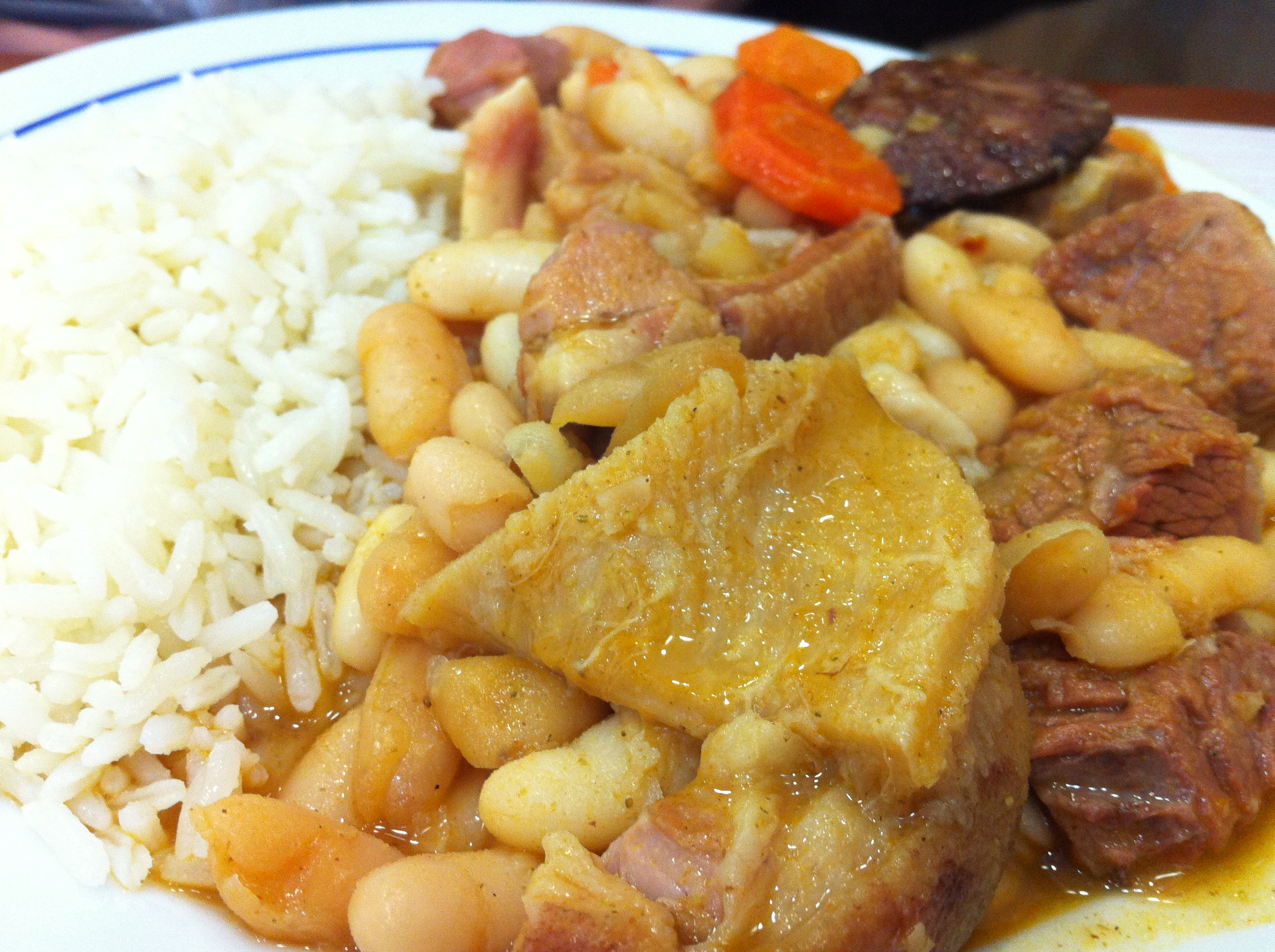
A typical dish of tripas à moda do Porto (tripes Porto style) also known as dobrada across Portugal.

The dish originated in Porto, in northern Portugal, where it is called dobrada or tripas—people from Porto are nicknamed tripeiros. It has been a traditional Portuguese dish since the 15th century, and became also traditional in Brazil.

== In popular culture ==
It was the theme of Fernando Pessoa's poem "Dobrada à moda do Porto".

The joke website of the UK Tripe Marketing Board featured the dish on its series of 2014 World Cup recipe cards.

== See also ==
- List of Portuguese dishes
- Tripas
- Tripe
- Tripas à moda do Porto
