= State trading enterprises =

Companies and businesses that conduct government-sanctioned trade transactions

State trading enterprises are enterprises authorized to engage in trade (exporting and/or importing) that are owned, sanctioned, or otherwise supported by government. STEs are legitimate trading entities and are subject to GATT rules. Examples include the Canadian Wheat Board, the Australian Wheat Board, and historically, the New Zealand Wheat Board (Wheat Committee from 1936 to 1965), which subsidised wheat growing and set the price of bread until 1987, and the New Zealand Dairy Board in New Zealand.

Historically the Milk Marketing Board operated in the UK and along with WTO free trade movements has been dissolved. An operating State Trading Organization exists in the Maldives.

Some U.S. agricultural producers think, however, that STEs through their exercise of monopoly power and government support may distort trade in their respective commodities.

== See also ==
- Commodity Credit Corporation
- Foreign Market Development Program
- Food, Conservation, and Energy Act of 2008
- Marketing board
