= Marketing board =

A marketing board is an organization set up by a government to regulate the buying and selling of a certain commodity within a specified area.

== List of marketing boards ==
=== Botswana ===
- Botswana Meat Commission
- Botswana Agricultural Marketing Board

=== Canada ===
- Canadian Wheat Board
- Dairy Farmers of Ontario
- Ontario Pork Producers' Marketing Board

=== Ghana ===
- Ghana Cocoa Board

=== India ===
- Agricultural produce market committee
- Kerala Co-operative Milk Marketing Federation
- Tamil Nadu State Agricultural Marketing Board (TNSAMB)

=== Ireland ===
- Irish Dairy Board

=== Nigeria ===
- Nigerian Groundnut Board
- Nigerian Cotton Board
- Nigerian Grains Board
- Nigerian Roots and Tubers Board
- Nigerian Palm Produce Board
- Nigerian Cocoa Board
- Nigerian Rubber Board

=== United Kingdom ===
- British Wool Marketing Board
- Egg Marketing Board
- Milk Marketing Board
- Potato Council
- Tripe Marketing Board, an internet parody

=== United States ===
- American Egg Board
- Idaho Potato Commission
- National Pork Board
- Walnut Marketing Board

==== California ====
- California Milk Processor Board
- California Raisin Marketing Board

== See also ==
- Agricultural marketing
- State trading enterprises
