= Maldives Industrial Fisheries Company =

The Maldives Industrial Fisheries Company (MIFCO), is a public company engaged in the production, processing and marketing of fish and fishery products. The company was incorporated in 1993.

== History ==
Maldives Industrial Fisheries Company (MIFCO)
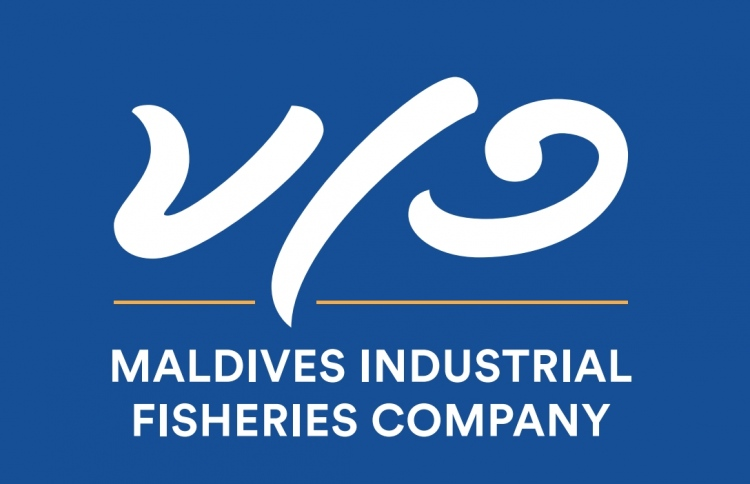
- Company type: Government Owned Fisheries Company
- Industry: Fishing industry
- Founded: November 1, 1993
- Headquarters: Malé, Maldives (head office)
- Products: Canned Tuna; Frozen Tuna; Fish Meal katsobushi Loins
- Revenue: N/A
- Number of employees: 1790+
- Website: mifco.mv

Fishing has always been part of the Maldivian lifestyle. It's the primary source of income for island communities. The small scale fishing practices feeds the family, then the community, and then exports the excess which personifies sustainable fisheries in the Maldives.

In 1977, the Government of Maldives, with a Japanese investment set up a cannery at Lhaviyani Atoll. Felivaru, adding commercial value to the daily catch. This began the first industrial scale value addition process in the Maldives fishing industry. To this day, canned tuna is popularly known as Felivaru Masdhalhu.

The company was a subsidiary of the State Trading Organization (STO), before President Mohamed Muizzu declared the company as a 100% state owned company.

== Pole and line fishery ==
The Maldivian skipjack industry, a 100% pole and line process is the dominant economic fishery activity in the country.

== Products ==
=== Canned tuna ===
MIFCO's canned tuna is specified as Premium, Fancy, Standard, and local packs that include sauce tuna, and caterers pack. Canned products are manufactured from cooked tuna fish, which is skinned, headed, eviscerated, trimmed of all blood meat, scorched and packed with a covering of oil or brine in hermetically sealed can and sterilized to achieve commercial sterility by application of heat.

=== Frozen tuna ===
The fish is treated by Blast or brine freezing method. The frozen species are Katsuwonus Pelamis “Skipjack” and Thunnus Albacares “Yellowfin” tuna.

=== Fish meal ===
Fishmeal, a fertilizer as well as an essential ingredient in poultry, and fish feed, this is by product of the cannery. To reduce amount of waste exhausted from fish products, fish meal is produced from the waste fish from the cannery.

=== Katsuobushi ===
Katsuobushi is the Japanese name for a specific type of smoked dried tuna. Although Katsuobushi is a form of dried skipjack, the product may be said to be similar to the traditional Maldive Fish. However, the process of smoke drying which lasts for 21 days at a minimum as opposed to less than a week's drying for normal smoked skipjack means that Katsuobushi is much drier, therefore a better preserved product. Quality of the product is maintained by using specially imported wood from Japan at specific stages of smoking and by using Refrigerated Containers for shipping the finished product.

=== Loins ===
There are two kind of loins: cooked loins and frozen loins.

=== Frozen Yellowfin Tuna ===
Frozen/chilled yellowfin, gilled and gutted, are exported individually cleaned and packed in master card board boxes with gel ice packets.

== See also ==
- Industries in Maldives
