= State Trading Organization =

Maldivian public company

State Trading Organization Plc
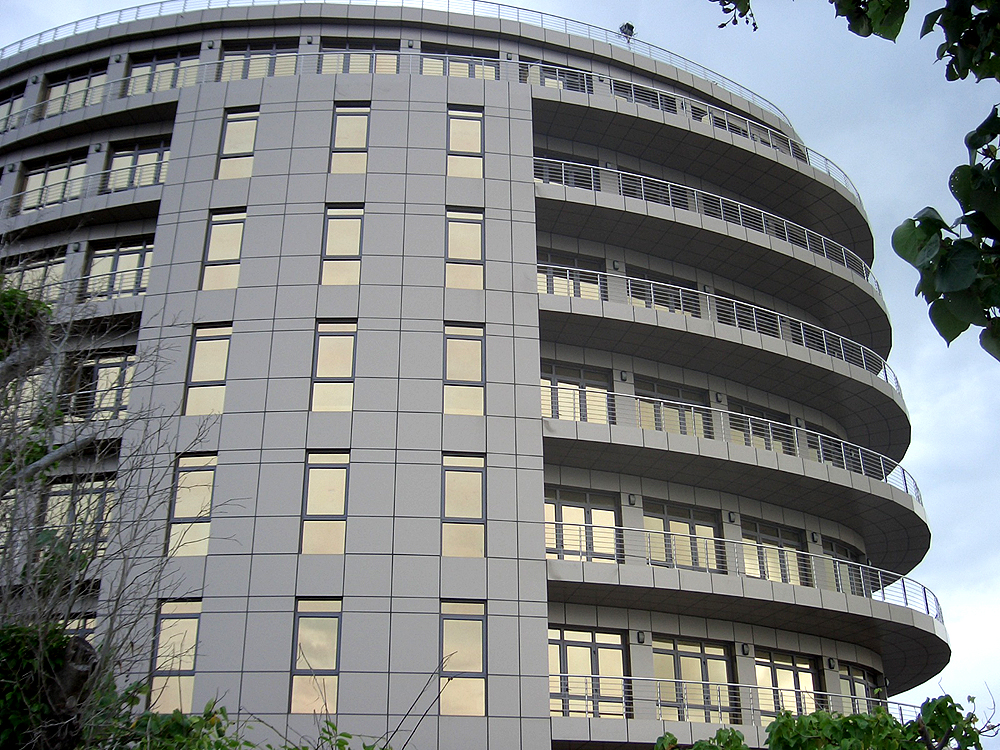
- STO Building
- Type: Public
- Industry: Consumer Electronics, Home Appliances, Medicals, Supermarket Products, and range of other high quality products
- Predecessor: Athireegemaafannu Trading Account (ATA)
- Founded: Malé, Maldives (1964)
- Headquarters: Kanba Aisa Rani Hingun Malé, Maldives
- Key people: Abdullah Saeed (Managing Director)
- Products: Consumer Electronics, Home Appliances, Medicals, Supermarket Products and other retail products
- Revenue: ▲MVR 1873 million (2020)
- Number of employees: 2,031
- Subsidiaries: Allied Insurance Company of the Maldives Pvt Ltd; Maldive Gas Pvt Ltd; Fuel Supplies Maldives Pvt Ltd; Raysut Maldives Cement Pvt Ltd; Maldives National Oil Company; Maldives Industrial Fisheries Co Ltd; STO Hotels and Resorts Pvt Ltd; Maldives Structural Products Pvt. Ltd; STO Maldives (Singapore) Pte Ltd; Maldives State Shipping
- Website: sto.mv

The State Trading Organization Plc (MSE:STO ) or STO is a public company with 81.63% of the shares owned by the Maldivian Government with the rest 18.37% being held by the public after the IPO a couple of years ago. The company is controlled by a board of directors headed by a Chairman.

== Outlets ==
STO People's Choice - On 15 March 2022, Vice President of Maldives, Hon. Faisal Naseem opened the newly refurbished STO People's Choice. The store is for home appliances, ACs, TVs and Supermart products. The store includes a pharmacy as well. In addition, to support SMEs, the company has leased space from the store to third-party vendors which include stationaries, toys, mobile phones and gadgets.

STO Staple Foods - Since the establishment of STO in the mid 60s, it has been selling staple foods.

STO Medical Services - STO Medicals Services sells drugs. Located at the OPD wing of the Indira Gandhi Memorial Hospital. STO Medical Services holds the main stores of pharmaceuticals and is responsible to supply the Pharmacy and a number of other Corporate Clients which include the IGMH, the Regional Hospitals and a number of other Chemists and Pharmacists in Malé and other islands.

STO Construction Solutions - Established in 1988, deals with construction materials such as cement, river sand, deformed bars, plywood, timber, and roofing materials. It also functions as the main distributor of locally packed international standard cement and roofing sheets with the aide of its subsidiaries Maldives Marine Cement and Maldives Structural Products.

STO Fuel and Lubricants - Operated from Funadhoo island and Dhoonidhoo island (Malé Atoll) deals with the supply and sale of a wide variety of petroleum products. In January 2001, Fuel and Lubricants diversified as a joint venture between Fuel Supplies Maldives Pvt. Ltd. (FSM) Plc. and Vara Maldives. Pvt. Ltd. to further extend their distribution network to the entire Maldives.

STO Agricenter - STO Agricenter was opened on 12 April 2021 with the aim of providing agricultural products produced by Maldivian farmers to retail and wholesale customers.

STO Thoddoo Agricenter - Thoddoo Agricenter was opened on 20.10.2021. AA. Thoddoo consists of many farmers who mass-produce agricultural products. Hence, the farmers of Thoddoo can remain on their own island and be able to sell their produce directly at the Agricenter. The main objective is to market the product to the nearby resorts and supply them to Malé and nearby islands to sell.

STO Makita Showroom -STO Makita Showroom was opened on 27 July 2022 at Sea Tracs Building. The one-stop showroom specifically opened for Makita Tools.

== Services ==
STO specializes in both retail and wholesale businesses involving selling goods directly to end customers for personal use and providing products to wholesale customers.

The company has its branches in the following islands (locations) nationwide:

- Eydhafushi (STO 132 No. Fihaara)
- Fonadhoo (STO 134 No. Fihaara)
- Fuvahmulah (STO 136 No. Fihaara)
- Gan (STO 141 No. Theyo Fihaara)
- Hithadhoo (STO 137 No Fihaara)
- Hoarafushi (STO 122 No. Fihaara)
- Maradhoo-Feydhoo (STO 159 No. Fihaara)
- Thinadhoo (STO 138 No. Fihaara)
- Hulhumeedhoo (STO 164 No. Fihaara)
- Kulhudhuffushi (STO 165 No. Fihaara)

STO established its credit scheme service in 1995 with the purpose of enabling all government employees to purchase goods from STO on installment basis.

== Subsidiaries ==
=== Allied Insurance ===
Allied Insurance Company of the Maldives (doing business as Allied Insurance) was established in 1985 as a joint venture company between the State Trading Organization and Commercial Union Assurance Company of the United Kingdom. In its early years, the State Trading Organization bought back the shares and the company continued operations with local ownership and management. Allied has had tremendous growth over the past 20 years, both in terms of the volume of business and profitability.

=== Fuel Supplies Maldives (FSM) ===
Fuel Supplies Maldives Pvt Ltd was established on January 1, 2001. FSM was founded as part of the scheme of STO to choose private companies to form partnerships in specialized lines of services.

=== Maldive Gas Pvt Ltd ===
Maldive Gas, which is in the natural gas distribution market, delivers cooking gas to over 40,000 customers throughout the Maldives.It supplies Liquefied Petroleum Gas (LPG) ranging from 2 kg to 45 kg cylinders with appliances for domestic and industrial purposes

=== Maldives Structural Products (MSP) ===
Maldives Structural Products Pvt. Ltd (MSP) is a joint venture company of State Trading Organization PLC & Rainbow Enterprises Pvt. Ltd., formed with the main objective of producing steel roofing products and related accessories and supply to the Maldives market.

=== Maldives National Oil Company Ltd (MNOC) ===
The Maldives National Oil Company Ltd (MNOC) was incorporated by the Government of the Republic of Maldives to complement the Government's effort to diversify the national economy and thereby generate employment and foreign income through oil and gas exploration and production in the territory of the Maldives and abroad.

=== Raysut Maldives Cement ===
With the rapid development of tourism in the country, the Government of Maldives embarked on the development of harbours, airports, housing and other infrastructure. The tourism industry continued to grow with local and foreign investment and large projects began to get off the ground. All these projects escalated the price of cement in the Maldives and led to the partnership between STO and Marine Cement Limited (a Swiss-based cement company owned by Lafarge of France and Blue Circle of United Kingdom) to form Maldives Island Marine Cement Pvt Ltd. The company was renamed Lafarge Maldives Cement Pvt Ltd in 2011, and with the 2020 acquisition of all foreign-held shares of the company by Raysut Cement Company of Oman, it became Raysut Maldives Cement.

=== Maldives State Shipping (MSS) ===
Maldives State Shipping was established in 2020 to serve all the traders in the Maldives for their imports and exports through MSS's liner services.

The company also creates employment opportunities for seafaring Maldivians. MSS is a wholly owned subsidiary of STO.

=== Former Subsidiaries ===
==== Maldives Industrial Fisheries Company Ltd (MIFCO) ====
MIFCO was incorporated under the umbrella of the STO group, until 2023 where it was converted to a 100% state owned enterprise.

== See also ==
- State trading enterprises
