= Tripas à moda do Porto =

Traditional Portuguese dish

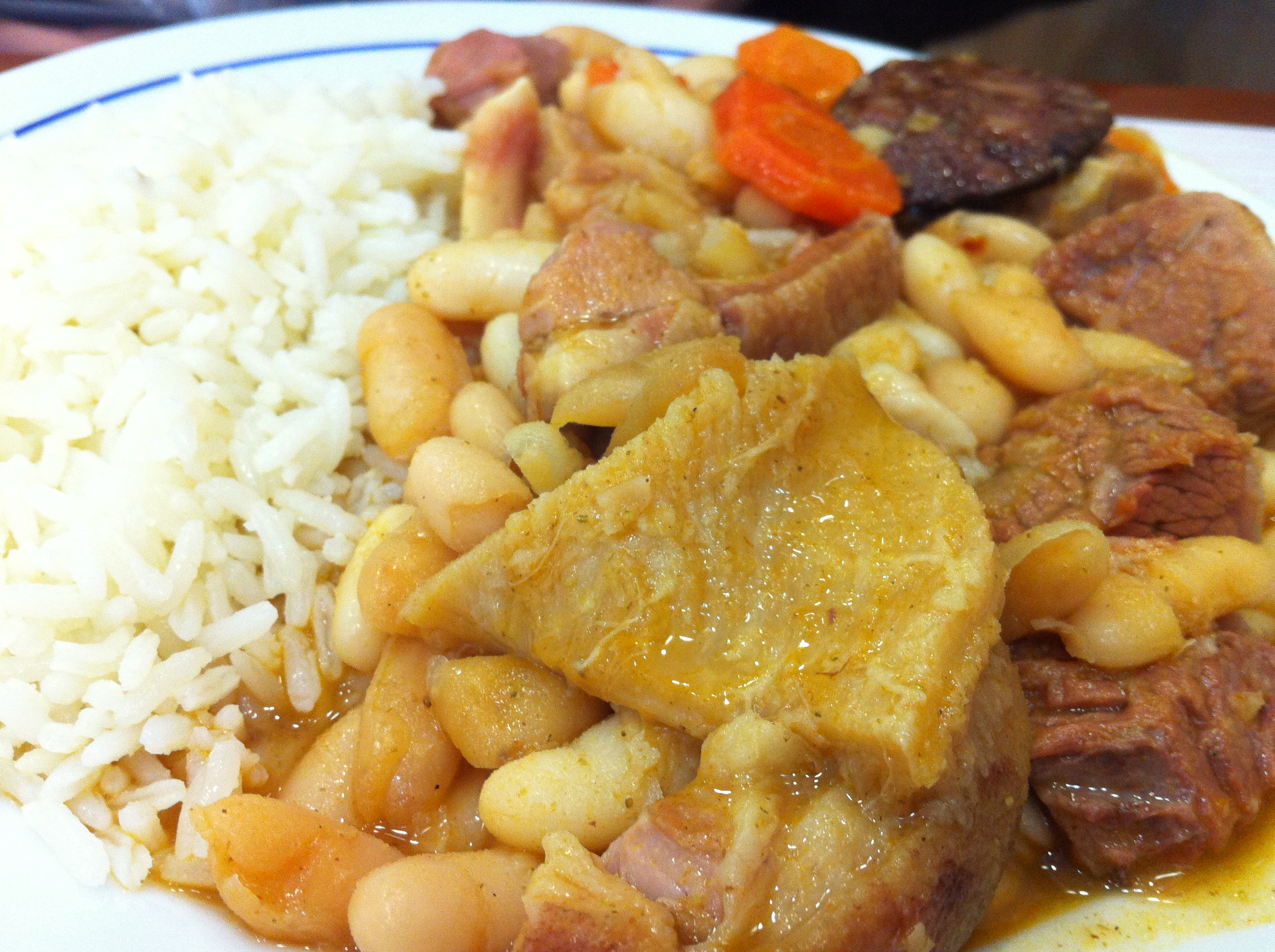
- A typical dish of tripas à moda do Porto (tripes Porto style) also known as dobrada across Portugal.
- Alternative names: Dobrada à moda do Porto
- Place of origin: Porto, Portugal
- Main ingredients: Meat, tripe, sausage and white beans

Tripas à moda do Porto or dobrada à moda do Porto in Portuguese cuisine is a dish of beef stomach made with tripe with white beans, carrots and rice. It is considered the traditional dish of the city of Porto, in Portugal, and widely known across the entire country, where it is also simply called dobrada.

== History ==
It is said that in 1415 the dish was created in Porto where the shipyard of Lordelo do Ouro was located. The ships and boats being secretly built there would take the Portuguese to Ceuta and, later, to the epic of the Portuguese Discoveries. Many and varied were the rumors about this achievement: some said the boats were destined to transport the Infanta D. Helena to England, where she would later marry; others said it was to take King D. João I to Jerusalem to visit the Holy Sepulchre; but there were still those who said that the armada was intended to lead the Infantes D. Pedro and D. Henrique to Naples, to marry. It was then that Infante D. Henrique unexpectedly showed up at Porto to check on the progress of the work at the shipyard. Even though he was satisfied with the work done, he thought more could have been done, and confided in Master Vaz, the faithful foreman of the construction, the secret and true reasons that were at its origin: the conquest of Ceuta. He asked everyone involved for more commitment and sacrifice and, in turn, Master Vaz assured the Infante that they would do the same as they had done some thirty years before during the war with Castile. The inhabitants would provide the boats with everything they had in the city, offering all the clean meat to those who would sail to the African coast, and would be left with only the innards of the animals, the guts. When hunger came, they did so, creating a very poor dish, consisting only of tripe and dark bread. But the people of Porto didn't have to suffer, for they invented a way to cook their tripe and this sacrifice earned them the nickname "tripeiros" (tripe eaters).

== In popular culture ==
Dobrada à moda do Porto was the theme of a poem written by Álvaro de Campos, one of the poet Fernando Pessoa's various heteronyms, and titled Dobrada à moda do Porto.

== See also ==
- Dobrada (food)
- Tripas
