= Tripas =

Mexican dish

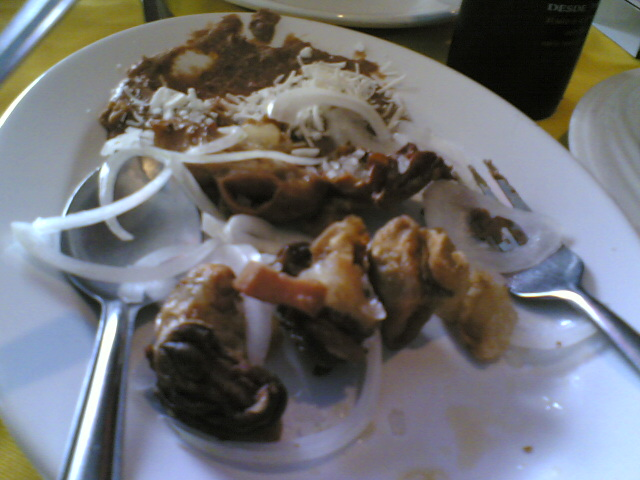
- Machitos with beans
- Type: Offal
- Place of origin: Mexico
- Main ingredients: Intestines

Tripas, in Mexican cuisine (known as chitterlings in English-speaking countries), are the intestines of farm animals that have been cleaned, boiled and grilled. Tripas are used as filling for tacos, and then dressed with condiments such as cilantro, chopped onions, and chile sauce. They are also served with pico de gallo and guacamole.

== Preparation ==
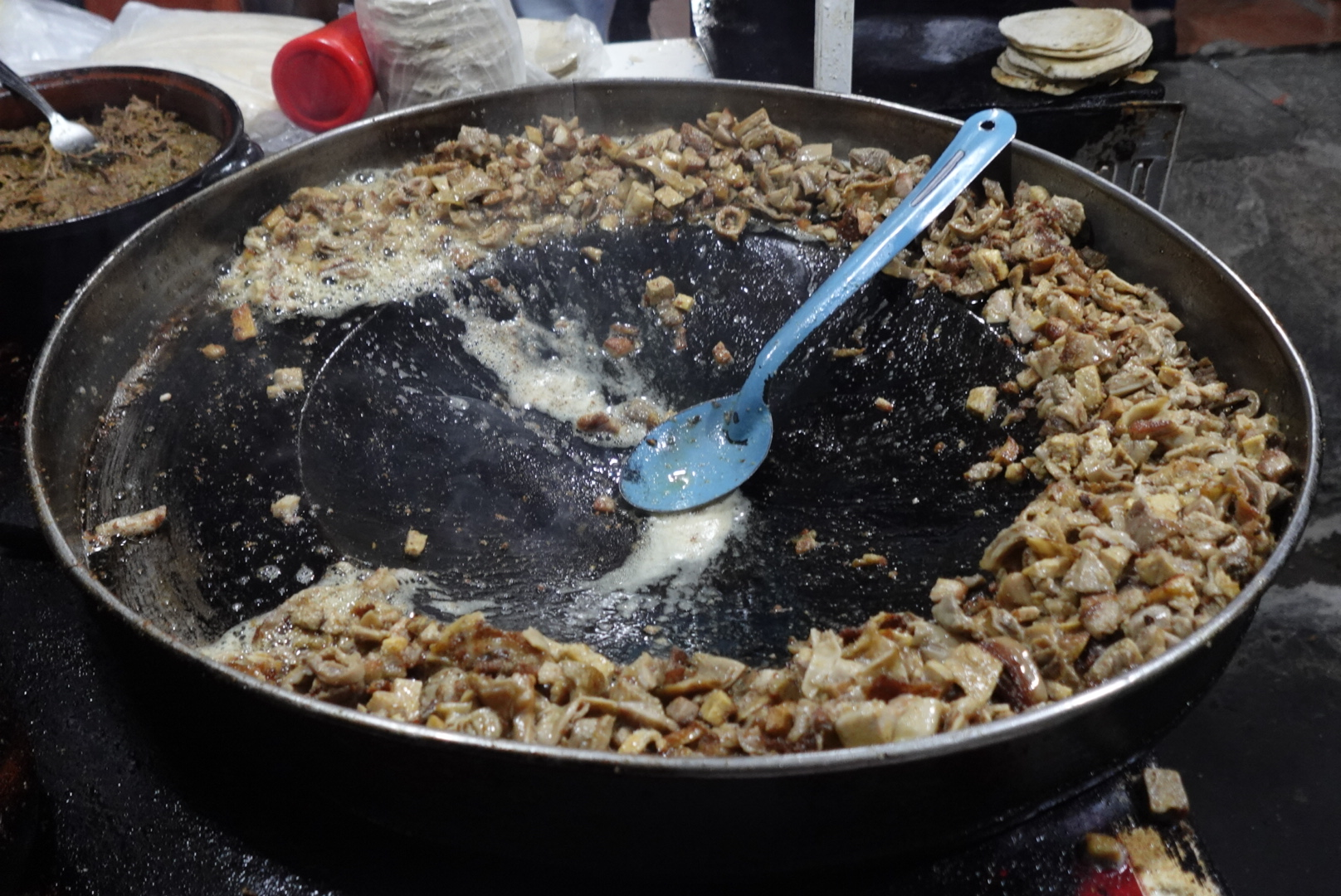
Tripas at a taco stand

Tripas as prepared Mexican style require care by the cook, to avoid becoming rubbery. They are traditionally cooked in a disco which is constructed of two tilling discs (commonly used in the farming industry) welded to an iron pole in the center of the discs to form a wok-like bowl on top of the pole with another disc about 8 to 10 inches (20 to 25 cm) below it. The tripas are placed in the top disc and filled with water while the lower disc is filled with wood or charcoal, thus creating the heat to cook. The tripas are boiled for several hours until tender, adding water as needed. Once they are tender the cook will allow the water to boil off and then finish the preparation by continuing to let them cook in their own fat.

Tripas are prepared in three levels:

1. 'Soft' preparation is attained shortly after the water boils off while the tripas are still tender with a velvet like texture. Properly prepared, they should not be rubbery but should have some firmness to them.
2. 'Medium Crispy' is reached by allowing the tripas to continue to cook in their own fat long enough for the exterior to crisp and harden. The center of the tripas are usually still soft and velvety.
3. 'Extra Crispy' preparation is reached by allowing the tripas to cook long enough to get crispy all the way through. Sometimes lard is added to the disco to reach this level of crispness, though sometimes just the fat rendered from cooking is used.

== Portuguese tripas ==
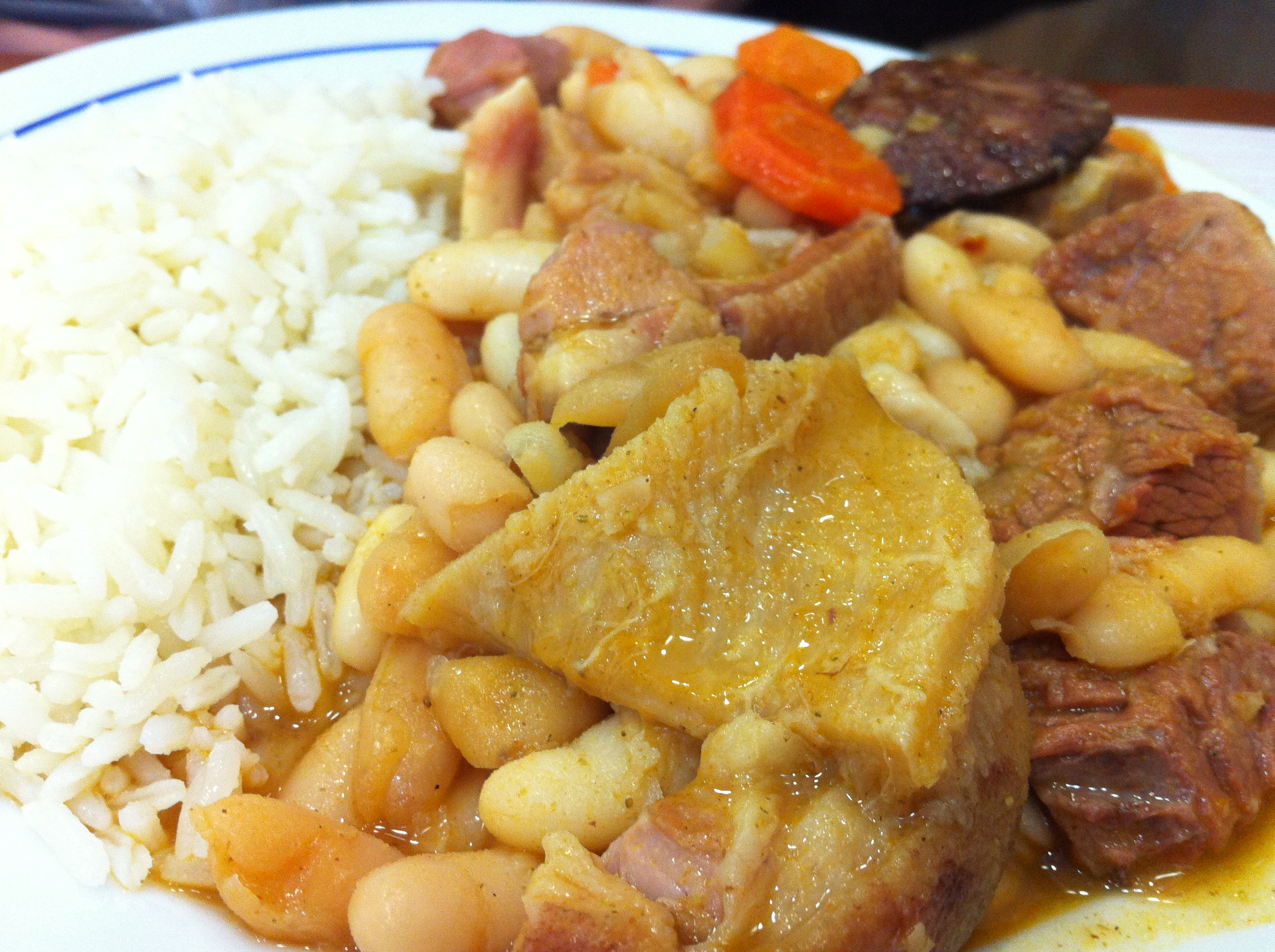
A typical dish of tripas à moda do Porto (tripes Porto style) also known as dobrada across Portugal.

Tripas or dobrada in Portuguese cuisine is beef stomach, and in the form of tripas à moda do Porto (tripes Porto style, with white beans, rice and carrots) is considered the traditional dish of the city of Porto, whose inhabitants are informally known as tripeiros. It is a typical and usual dish across many different regions of Portugal and is most widely known outside Porto as dobrada.

== See also ==
- Gopchang
