= Tahricht =

Berber dish

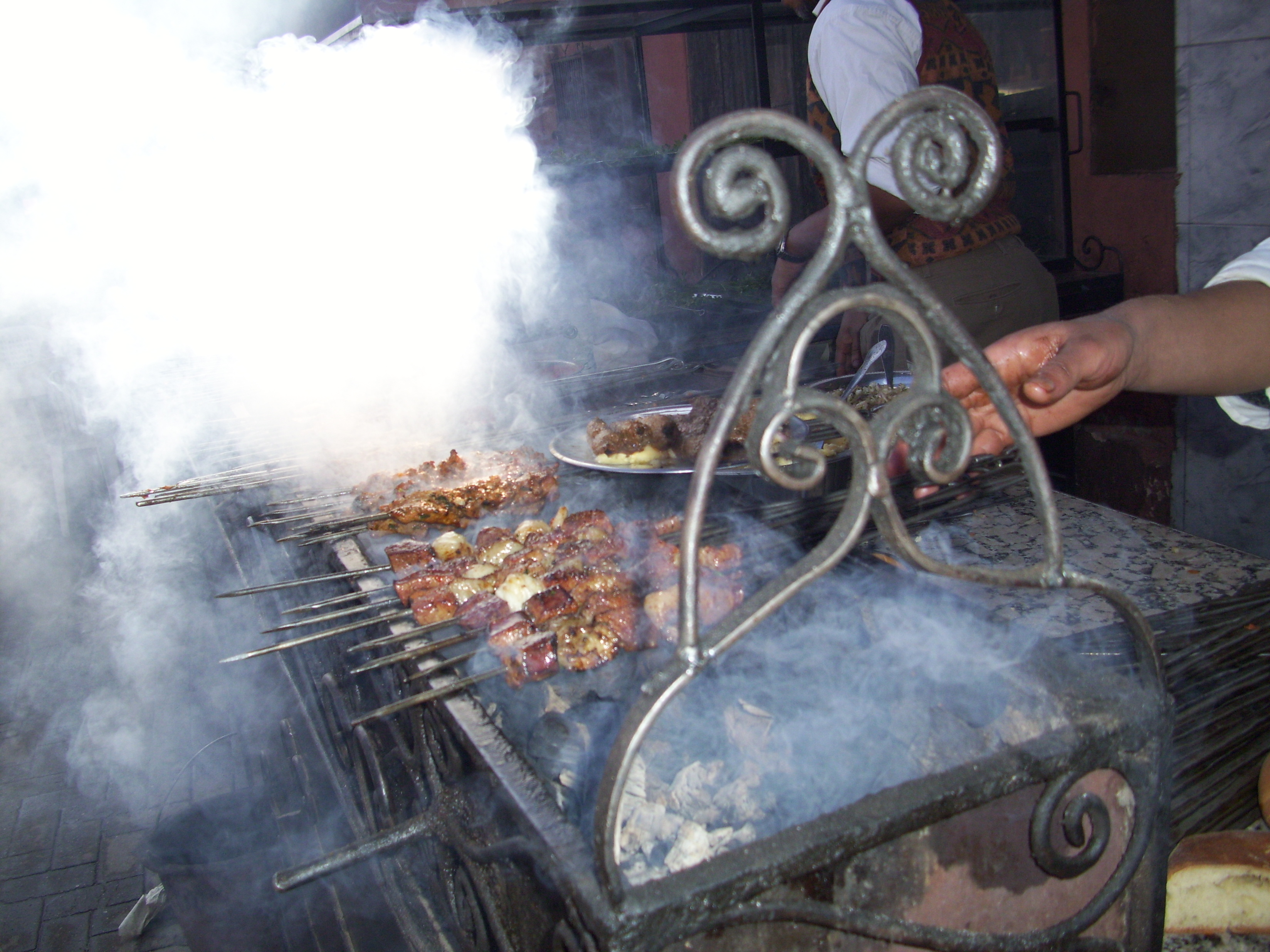
- Tahricht at a souk in the medina quarter of Marrakesh
- Place of origin: Morocco
- Region or state: Middle Atlas, High Atlas
- Associated cuisine: Berber cuisine
- Main ingredients: lamb tripe, spices
- Ingredients generally used: caul fat, heart, intestines, lung

Tahricht is a Berber cuisine skewered meat dish of charcoal grilled, spiced lamb tripe and other lamb offal from the Middle Atlas and High Atlas mountains of Morocco, particularly Ifrane Province. Offal used includes caul fat, heart, intestines, and lung. The dish is made for community celebrations like the Night of Power alongside dishes like tagoulla.

== See also ==
- Boulfaf, Moroccan cuisine grilled skewers of liver with caul fat
- Kokoretsi, Byzantine cuisine grilled offal skewer
