= Crépinette =

French sausage

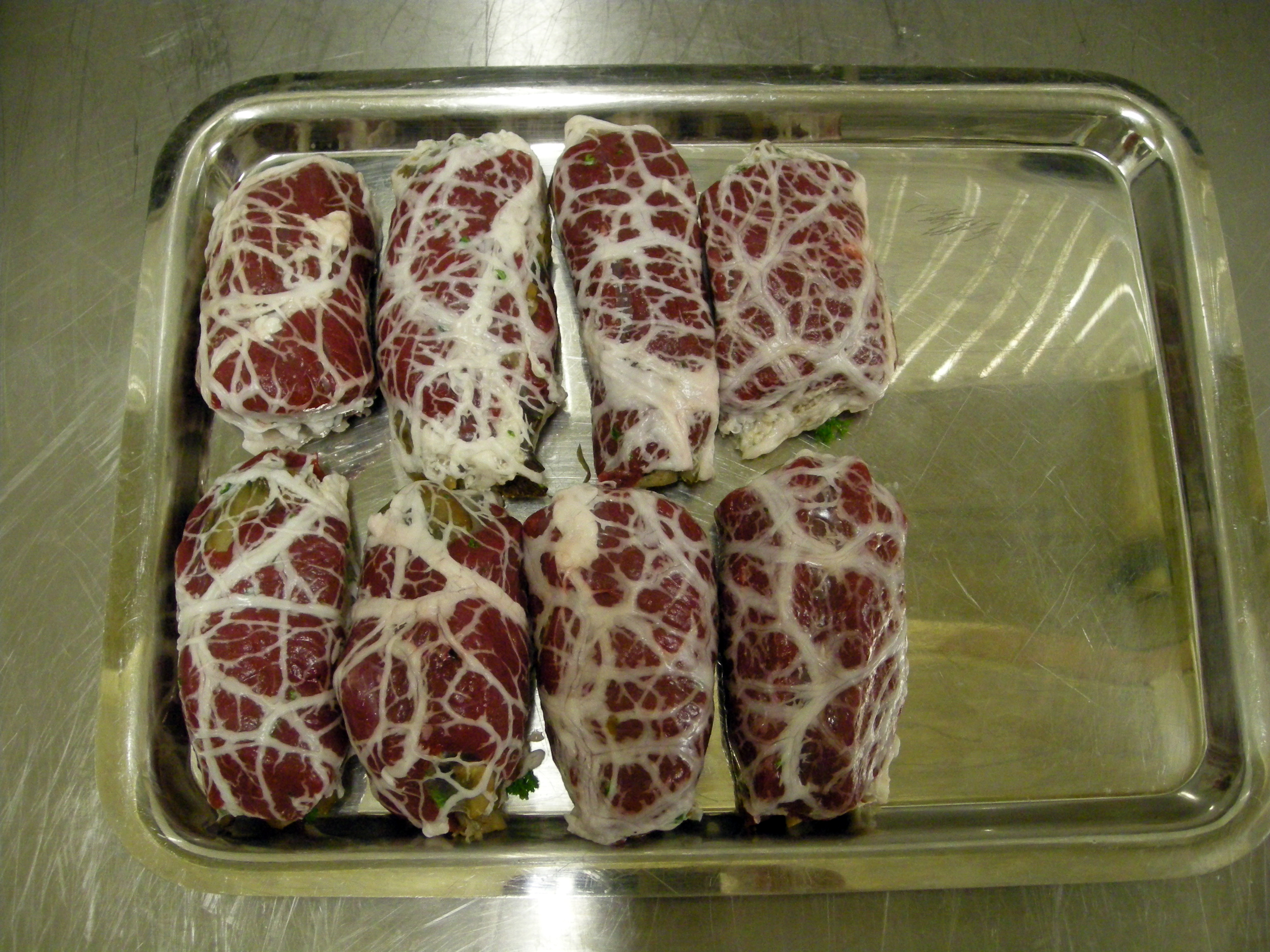
Ostrich crépinettes

A crépinette is a small, flattened sausage, sometimes referred to as a sausage parcel. It is similar in shape to a sausage patty, circular, and flattened.

It is made from minced or ground pork, turkey, veal, lamb or chicken, and can even be made from truffles.

A crépinette is wrapped in caul fat rather than a casing. It is usually cooked with an outer coating of bread and sautéed in butter.

== Name ==
The word crépine (pronounced [kʁepin]) is French for "pig's caul". The name originated in the second half of the 13th century as "a small ornamental crêpe", being derived from the word crêpe. In cookbooks, the term crépinette is sometimes used to indicate the contents of the crépinette only. This is the same as in other countries where crépinette, sometimes spelled crepinette, is used to describe both the contents and the dish itself.

== Definition ==
A crépinette is a mixture of minced meat stuffed in crépine – or caul fat – casing.

Although it has a different casing, it bears many similarities to sausages and is often described as a sausage dish. The filling is essentially similar to sausagemeat, and the crépinettes can be cooked and served in similar ways. However, a sausage traditionally is encased in casings made from intestines, giving the traditional sausage shape but also creating a more compressed, dense texture. A crépinette tends to be slightly looser in texture due to the caul fat casing having less elasticity and compressive strength.

It is described as a round and flat dish in a number of French dictionaries, but the precise shape is variable and may be more elongated or oval.

The crépinette is similar in structure to the English faggot – being a meatball wrapped in caul fat – although the composition of the filling is quite different.

== Composition ==
The stuffing of the crépinette can be made of ground pork, chicken fillets, finely ground game birds (partridge, woodcock, pigeon), and also lamb sweetbreads, calf kidneys, fillets of lark or rabbit, and sliced eel. Viard, however, gives recipes where the contents of the crépinette are not ground but entire pieces of meat.

== Cooking ==
The crépinette is cooked in a pan or on a grill.

== See also ==
- Skilpadjies
- Faggot (food)
- Sheftalia
