= Nyanya (dish) =

Traditional Russian food

- Place of origin: Russia
- Main ingredients: Sheep caul fat, mutton brains & head meat, mutton, onion, buckwheat porridge

Nyanya or niania (Russian: няня) is an ancient Russian dish. It consists of a sheep's caul fat stuffed with mutton brains, head meat, legs, onion and buckwheat porridge. After that, the dish can be fried in lard or baked in the oven in a clay pot.

== History ==
The dish is known from the 9th century.

Nyanya was forbidden by the Russian Orthodox Church because pagan Slavs used the dish in their rituals.

== In literature ==
The nyanya is mentioned in Dead Souls by Nikolai Gogol:

"My dear," said Sobakevitch, "the cabbage soup is excellent." With that he finished his portion, and helped himself to a generous measure of niania, the dish which follows shtchi and consists of a sheep's stomach stuffed with black porridge, brains, and other things. "What niania this is!" he added to Chichikov. "Never would you get such stuff in a town, where one is given the devil knows what."

The dish is also mentioned in Saltykov-Shchedrin's novel Old Years in Poshekhonye.

== See also ==
- Haggis
- List of Russian dishes
