= Boulfaf =

Moroccan liver kebab

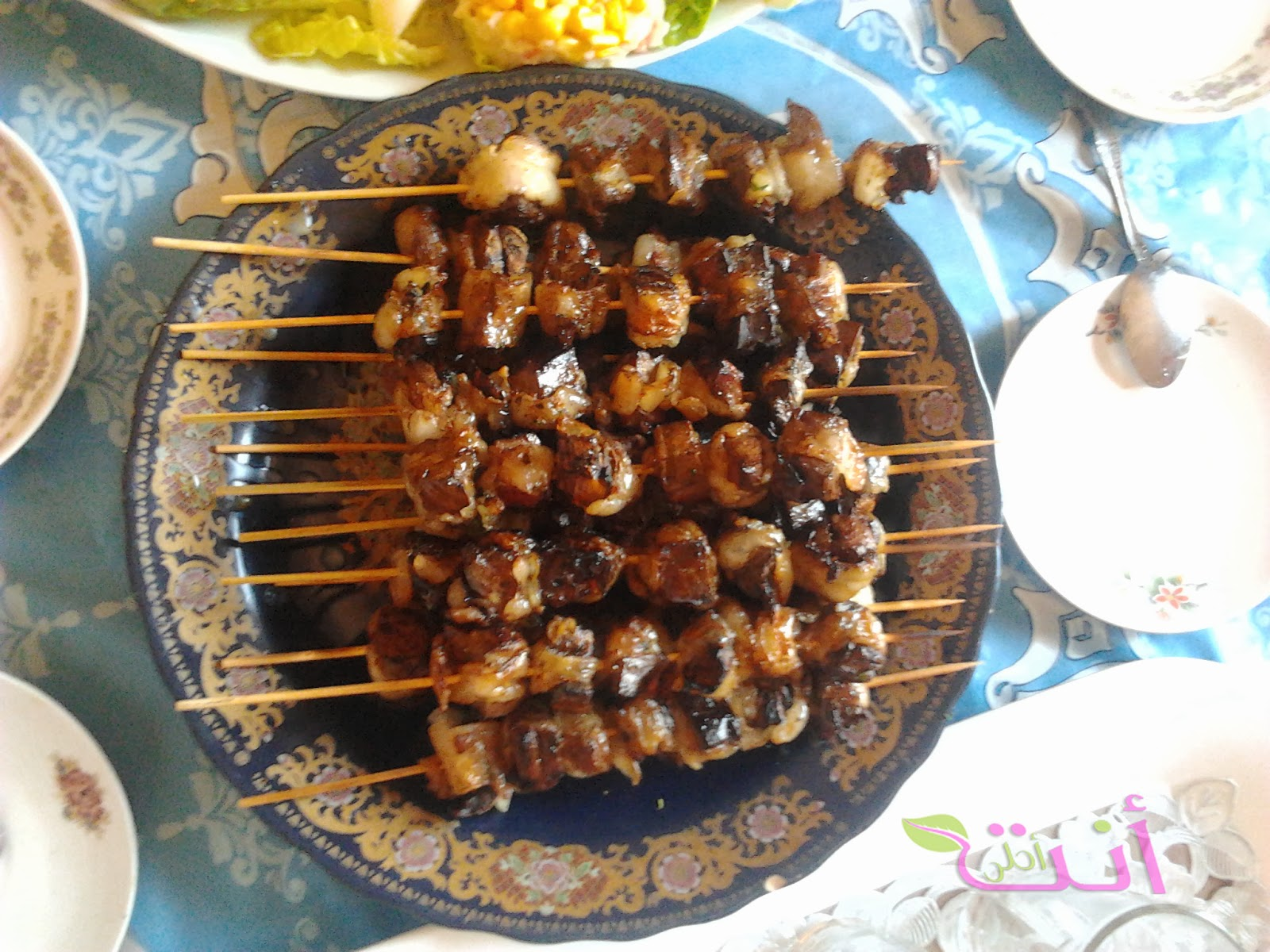
- Alternative names: kouah
- Type: kebab
- Place of origin: Morocco
- Associated cuisine: Moroccan cuisine
- Main ingredients: Liver, caul fat
- Ingredients generally used: Red pepper, cumin
- Variations: Suet, heart
- Similar dishes: Ciğer kebabı; Rumaki; Skilpadjies

Boulfaf (Arabic: بولفاف) is a grilled kebab made from liver wrapped in caul fat. A Moroccan cuisine dish, it is traditionally made during Eid al-Adha from a sacrificial lamb.

== Preparation and serving ==
A point of view walkthrough of making boulfaf, from processing the raw organs, assembling the skewers, and grilling, to serving.

Given the perishability of offal, boulfaf is one of the first dishes made from the sacrificial animal on Eid al-Adha. After slaughter, the caul fat is removed and hung to dry in the sun for an hour until crisp. After dicing the liver, the dried caul fat is cut into strips and wrapped around each liver brochette, skewered, and grilled. The brochettes are seasoned with red pepper and cumin.

Boulfaf may be eaten immediately, or stuffed in a khobz with accoutrements as a sandwich. It is traditionally served with Maghrebi mint tea as a family lunch dish.

== Variants ==
Kouah is a general term for grilled liver kebab in Moroccan cuisine, typically served as street food in souks. Kouah is typically calf or sheep liver cooked with intermittent brochettes of suet. Heart may also be included or substituted. The brochettes may be de-skewered and served in a khobz as a sandwich.

== Gallery ==
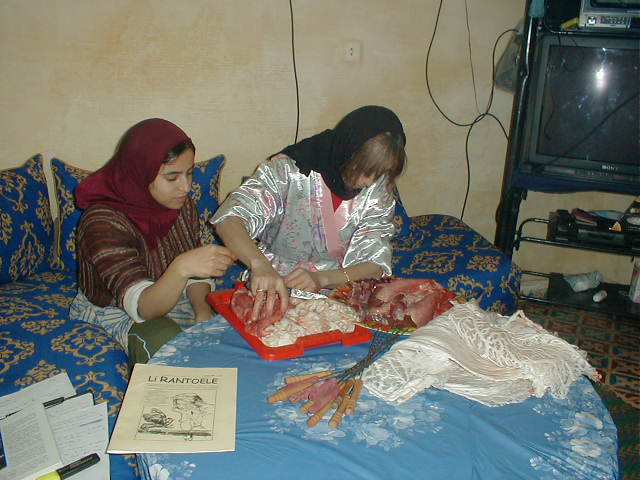
Family making boulfaf in living room

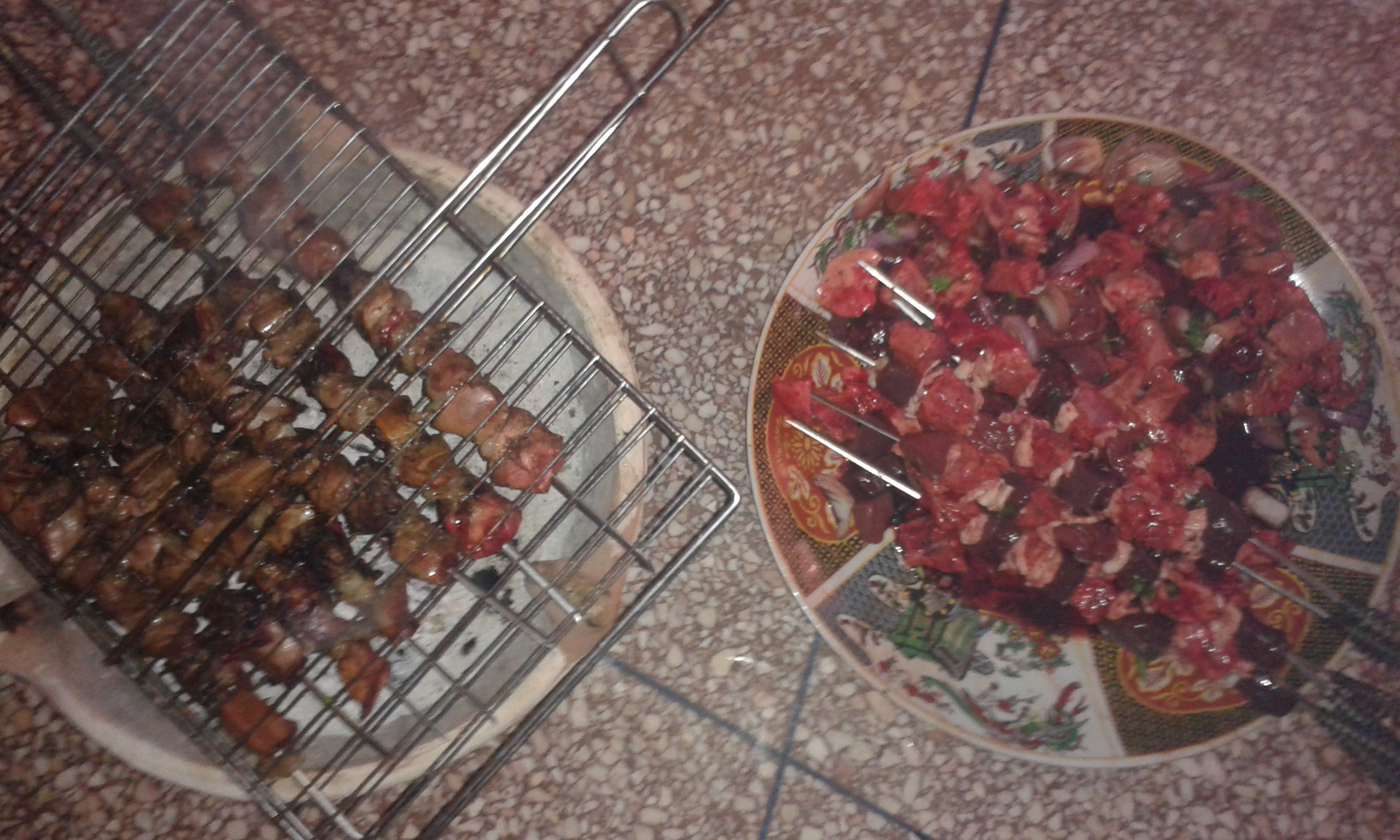
Grilling boulfaf (left), with raw skewers (right)

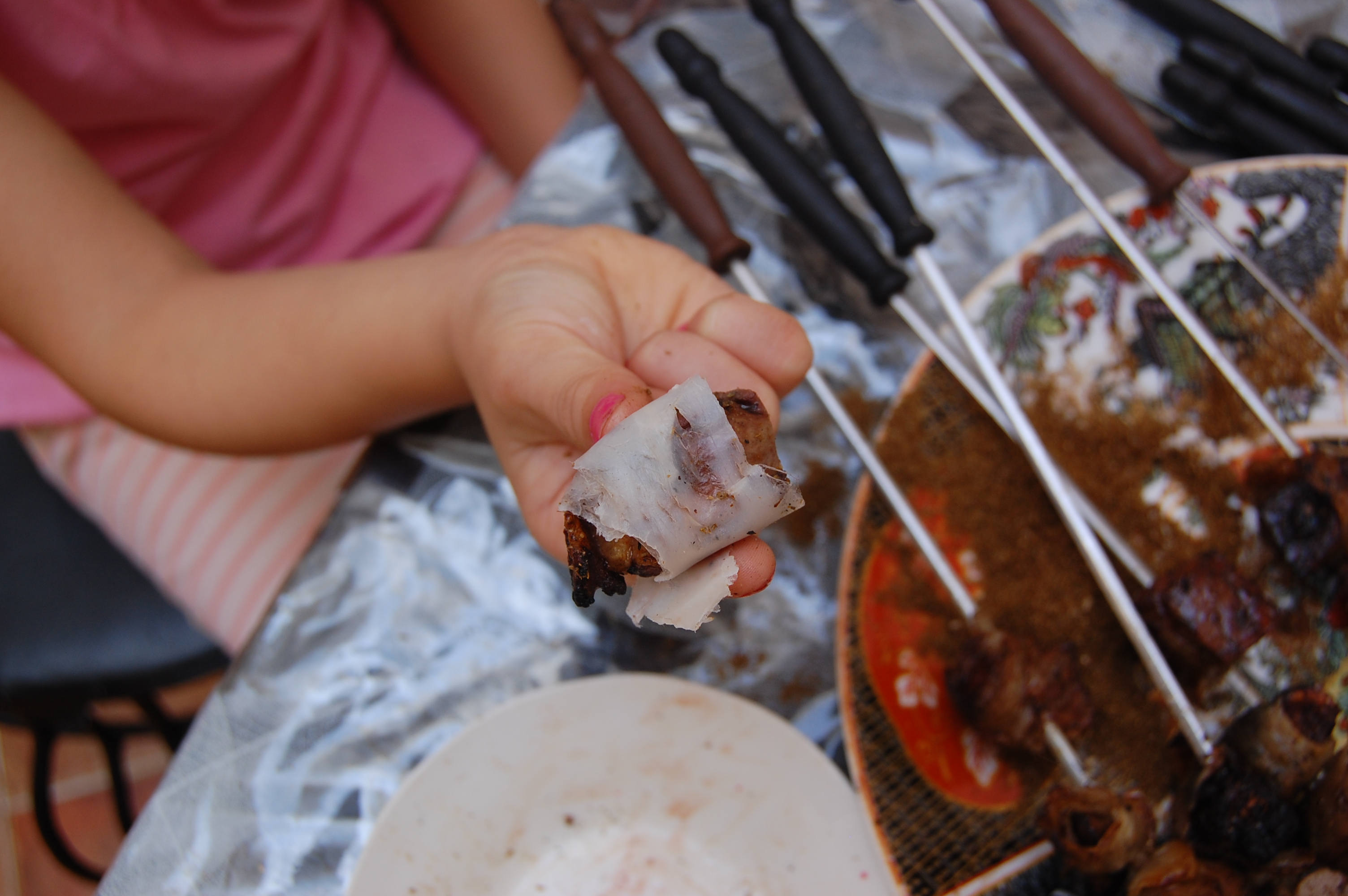
Grilled brochette of boulfaf

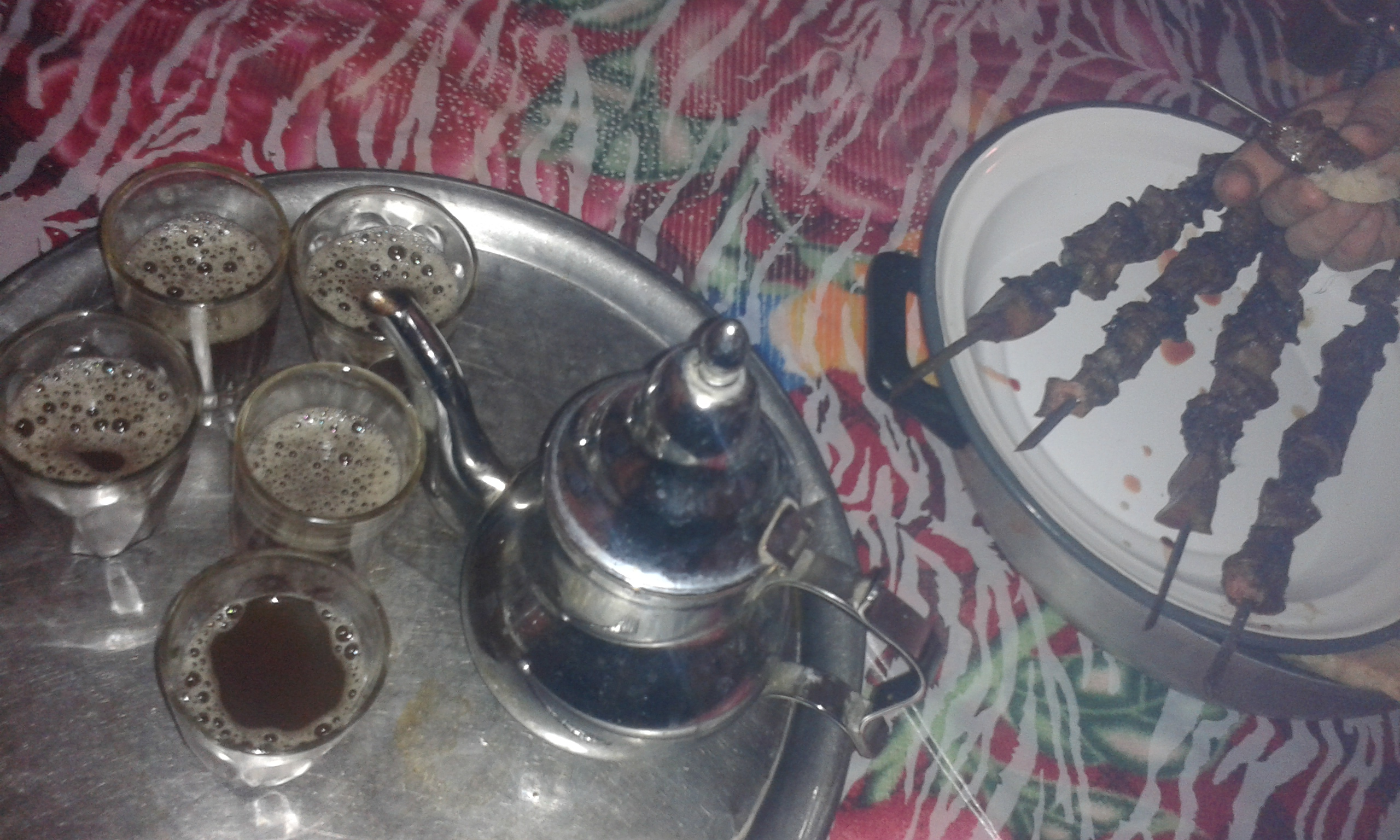
Boulfaf served with Maghrebi mint tea

== See also ==
- Kourdass
- Tehane
- Fatteh
