= Ciger =

Ciger may refer to

- Bojan Ciger, Serbian professional footballer
- Zdeno Cíger, Slovak former professional hockey player

== See also ==
- Ciğer kebabı, liver dish
- Tzigerosarmas (Turkish: ciğer sarması), "liver wrap"
