= Rissole =

European fried dish

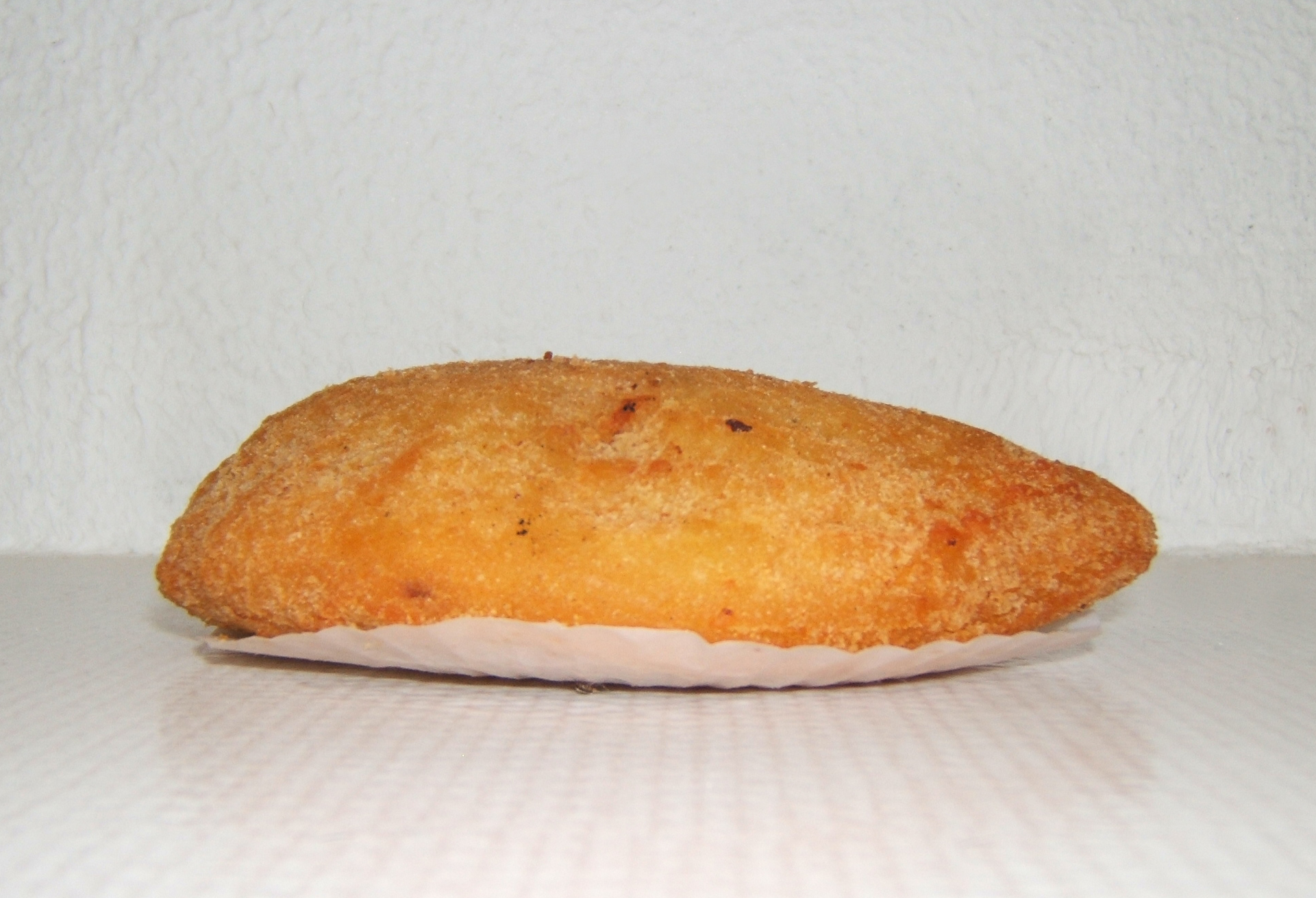
- Type: Croquette
- Main ingredients: Pastry or breadcrumbs; sweet or savory filling

A rissole (from Latin russeolus, meaning reddish, via French rissoler, meaning "to redden") is "a ball or flattened cake of chopped meat, fish or vegetables mixed with herbs or spices, then coated in breadcrumbs and fried."

== Variations ==
=== Europe ===
==== France ====
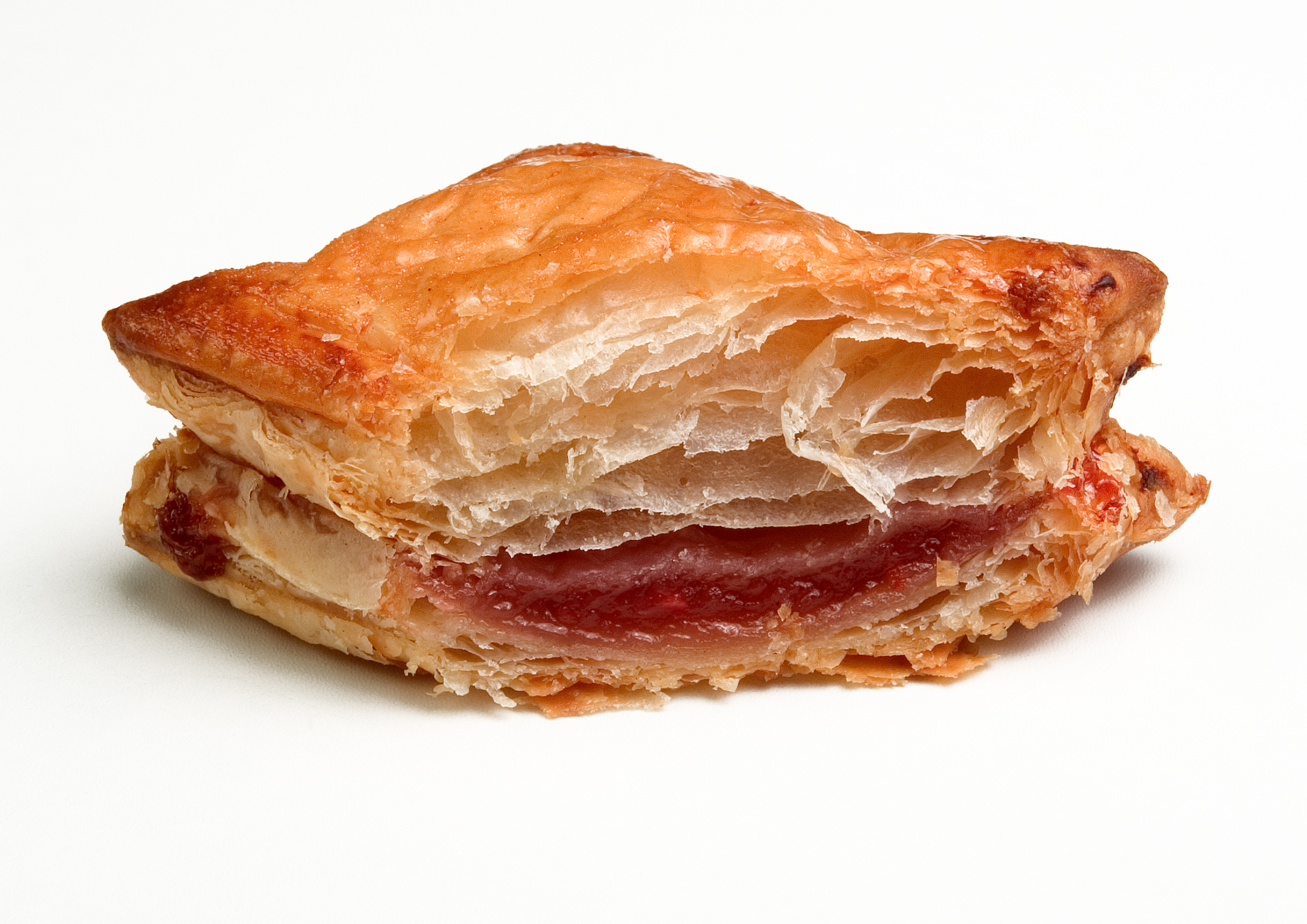
Rissoles from Savoy, France - dessert of baked pear compote

In France, rissoles can be served as a dessert cooked in the Savoy region. They are made of pears in batter and are baked, not fried.

In the north of France, rissoles de Coucy are made with meat or fish and can be baked or fried.

Different versions exist in Auvergne or in the east of France, with different kinds of meat or potatoes and cheeses.

The dough used is generally puff pastry or a kind of shortcrust pastry made with less butter. They can be baked or fried. Some versions made with shortcrust pastry are breaded before frying.

==== Great Britain ====
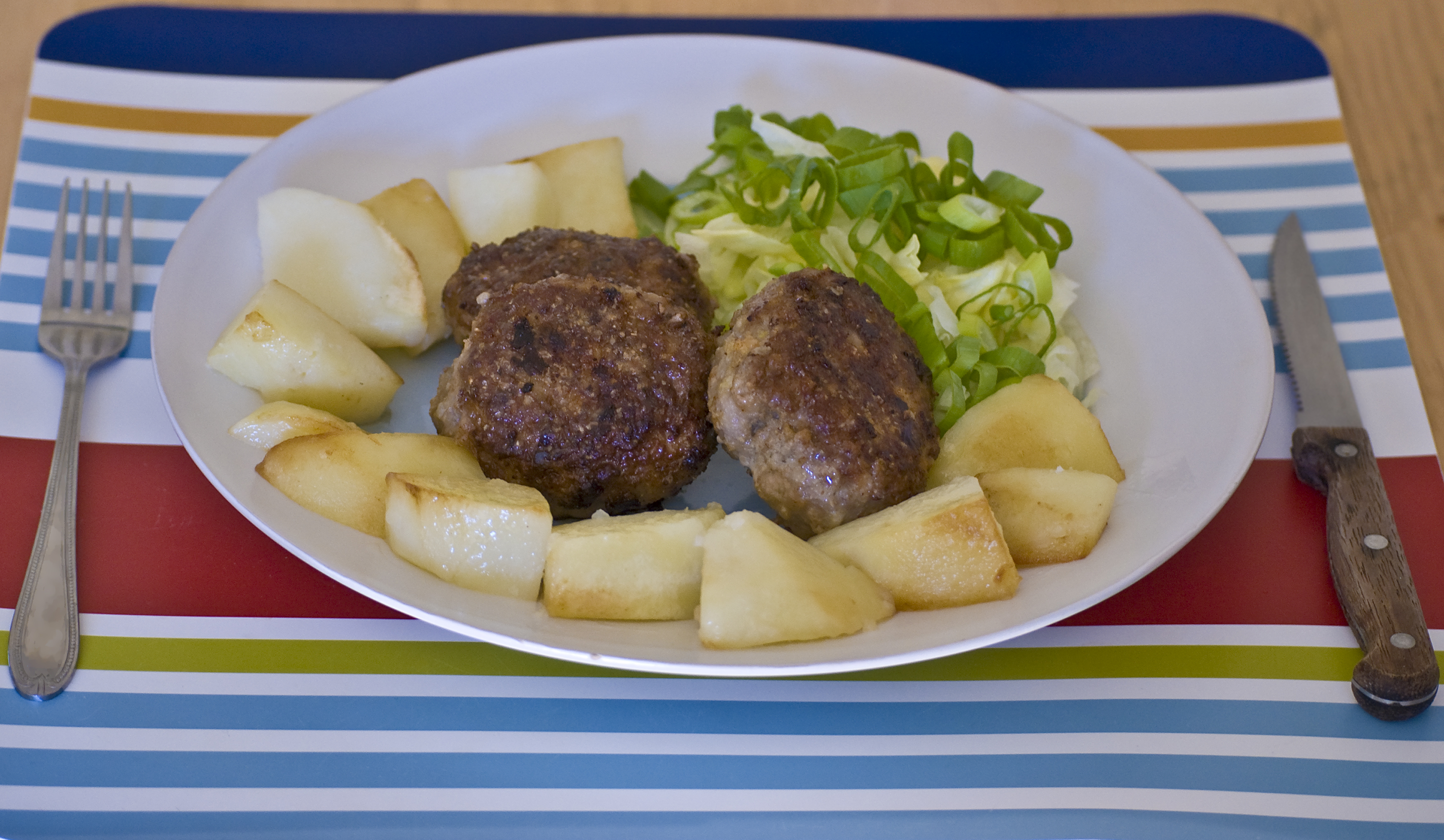
Meat rissoles with potatoes

In the 19th century, Mrs Beeton said French rissoles were "Pastry, made of light puff-paste, and cut into various forms, and fried. They may be filled with fish, meat, or sweets." However her recipes for everyday British meals described rissoles which contained breadcrumbs but were not coated with anything, just fried (see illustration). She gave recipes for beef, veal and potato rissoles.

In the United Kingdom during and after World War II, rissoles were typically an economy measure, made from cooked meat remaining from the Sunday roast dinner. They were not pastry-covered. Rissoles are sold in chip shops in south Wales, north-east England and Yorkshire, served with chips. These rissoles are meat (typically beef), or fish in Yorkshire, mashed up with potato, herbs and sometimes onion. They are coated in breadcrumbs or less frequently battered and deep-fried.

==== Ireland ====
Fried rissoles are common in Ireland, especially in the county of Wexford, where boiled potatoes are mashed, mixed with herbs and spices, battered or breadcrumbed, and served with chips, chicken or battered sausages.

==== Portugal ====
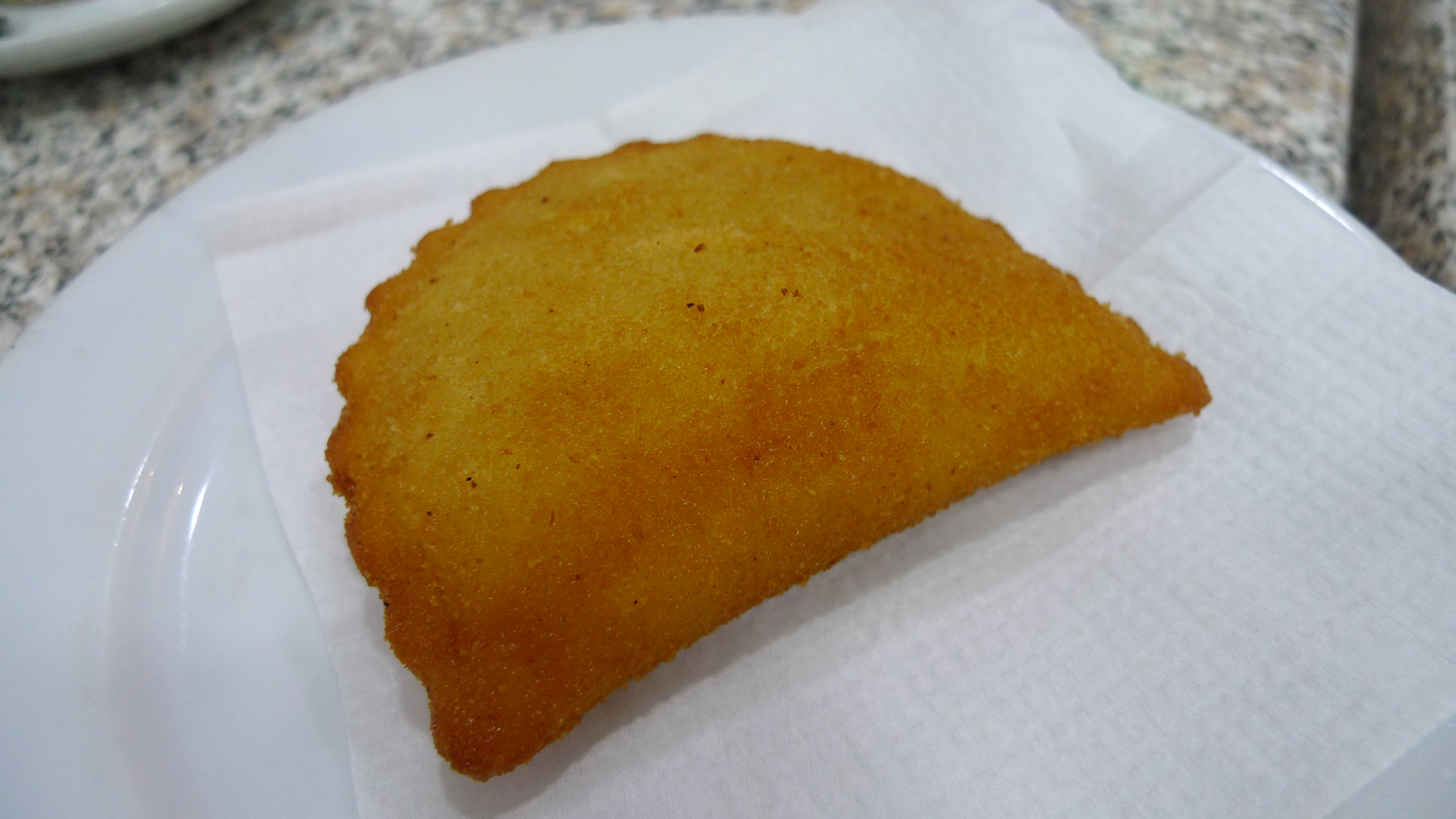
Rissole (rissol) from Portugal

In Portugal, rissoles are known as rissóis (singular "rissol") and are a very popular snack that can be found in many cafes, barbecues, house parties, receptions, birthday and baptism parties. Rissóis are a breaded pastry shaped like a half-moon, the classic version is filled with shrimp but they can also be filled with meat in béchamel sauce and then deep fried. The most common filling is shrimp (meat is also a choice in small parts of the country, but not very popular) (from pork, including piglet meat, or beef), although hake, tuna, octopus, vegetables, cod, duck, cockle and spinach are sometimes used too. Other and less common variations use chicken or a combination of cheese, normally slices of queijo Flamengo (Flemish cheese) and cubes or slices of pork ham as a filling. Sometimes lobster is also used. Rissóis are usually eaten cold, as a snack or as an appetizer, but can also be a main course, usually served with salad or rice, the rice could be peas rice, tomato rice, carrot rice, beans rice or greens rice.

=== Australia and New Zealand ===
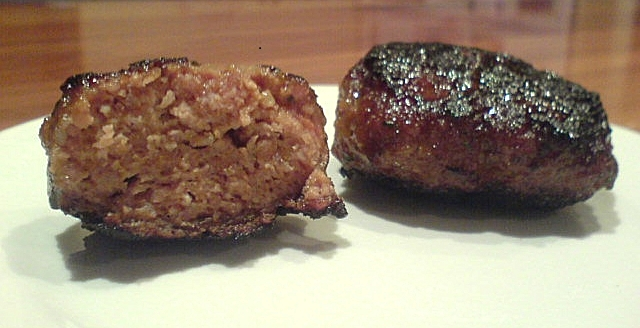
Australian rissoles, cooked and cut in half

The Australasian rissole is somewhat similar to a hamburger patty in ingredients, being made from minced meat, usually beef, bound with beaten egg, and with or without a coating of breadcrumbs. As for size and shape, it usually resembles a slightly flattened, medium to large-sized meatball. There are a variety of different recipes: along with the aforementioned main ingredients, rissoles commonly have a small amount of chopped onion as well as breadcrumbs directly included in the mix. Australian and New Zealand families will have their own family recipes: many will include various herbs and spices, certain types of diced vegetables (potato, carrot, zucchini etc), and sauces. As mentioned, while they are usually made from beef, rissoles can be made from other minced meats such as pork, chicken or especially lamb. Replacing meat altogether and using ingredients such as tuna and pumpkin is also not unheard of for vegetarian meals.

Rissoles are either fried in oil in a frypan or grilled on a barbecue and are usually eaten hot as part of a meal, e.g. as part of a traditional “meat and three veg” (i.e. meat served with mashed potato and two other boiled, steamed or roasted vegetables) meal. They are not usually eaten between bread with salad or cheese when hot: if they are then they’ll be considered to be hamburger patties, not rissoles, even though the recipe may be the same. Cold rissoles, either those made to be eaten once cold or those eaten as leftovers, can be eaten “as is” or as filling in a sandwich or bread roll.

The Australian rissole became popular during both World Wars as a means of stretching meat rationing set by the Australian government. Rissoles were made by butchers and housewives to use offcuts of meat, then finely minced with the adding of leftover bread crumbs, abundant flour, eggs, vegetables and herbs to improve the flavour. The Australian rissole has evolved over the past 100 years with some Australian families having special recipes and secret ingredients including beer, Vegemite, peanut butter, cornflakes, carrot, chilli, chicken noodle soup packet mix and spices.

=== Brazil ===
In Brazil, they are often filled with heart of palm, cheese, ham, ground meat, chicken or shrimp. A rissole may also be an empanada or a papa rellena 'stuffed potato'.

=== Indonesia ===
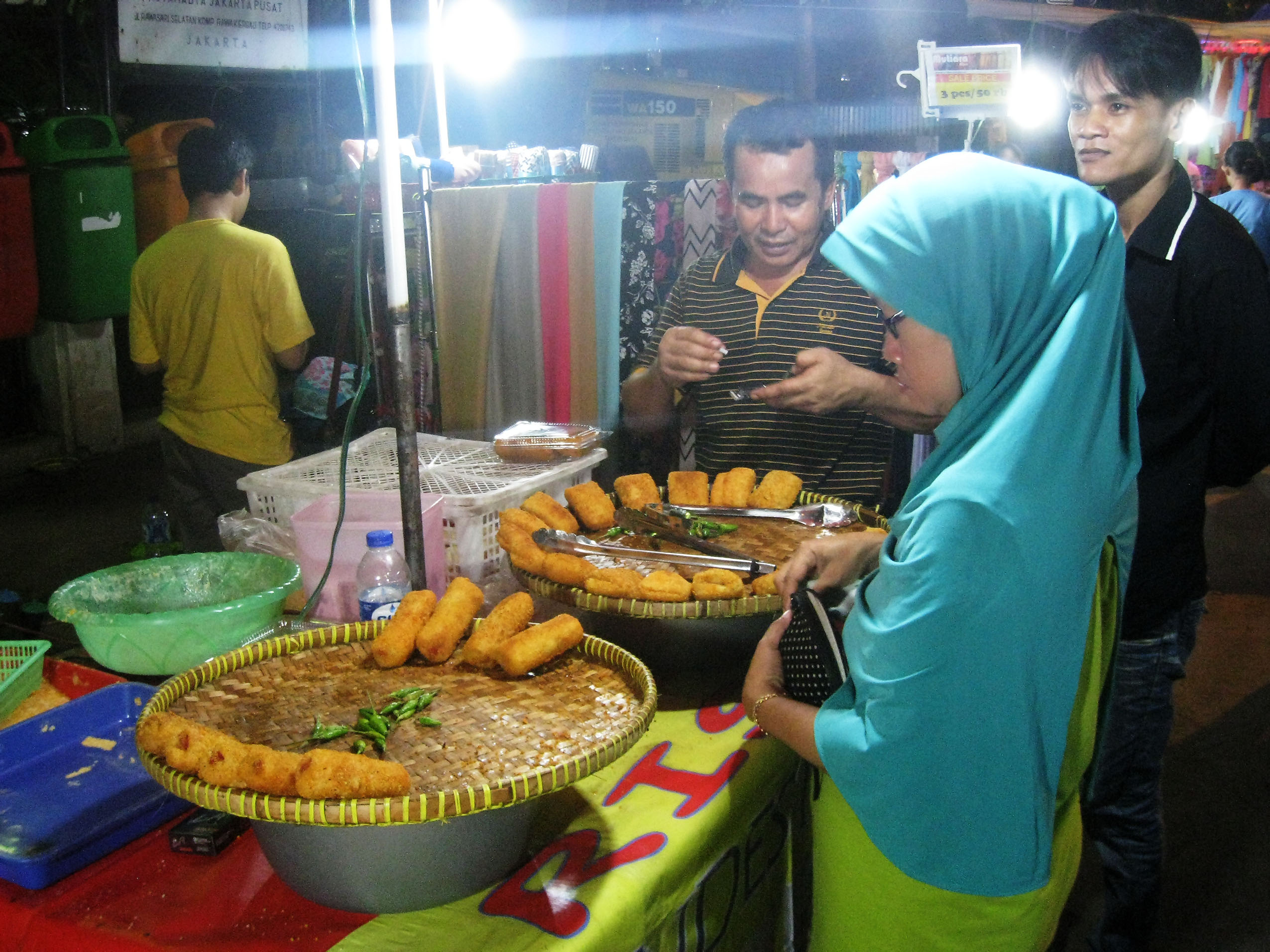
Vendor selling rissoles at the pasar malam (night market) in Rawasari, Jakarta

Rissole is a snack food in Indonesia, where they are called risoles (Indonesian: [ɾɪsɵleːs]) or just risol. The skin is made from batter in the same fashion as flat crepes. They are commonly filled with bechamel, chicken, egg, and diced vegetables - including carrot, celery, common beans and potato. The filling is wrapped inside the skin, then the package is rolled upon breadcrumbs and fried in ample amounts of hot cooking oil. It is eaten with bird's eye chili, chilli sauce, tomato sauce, mayonnaise or mustard.

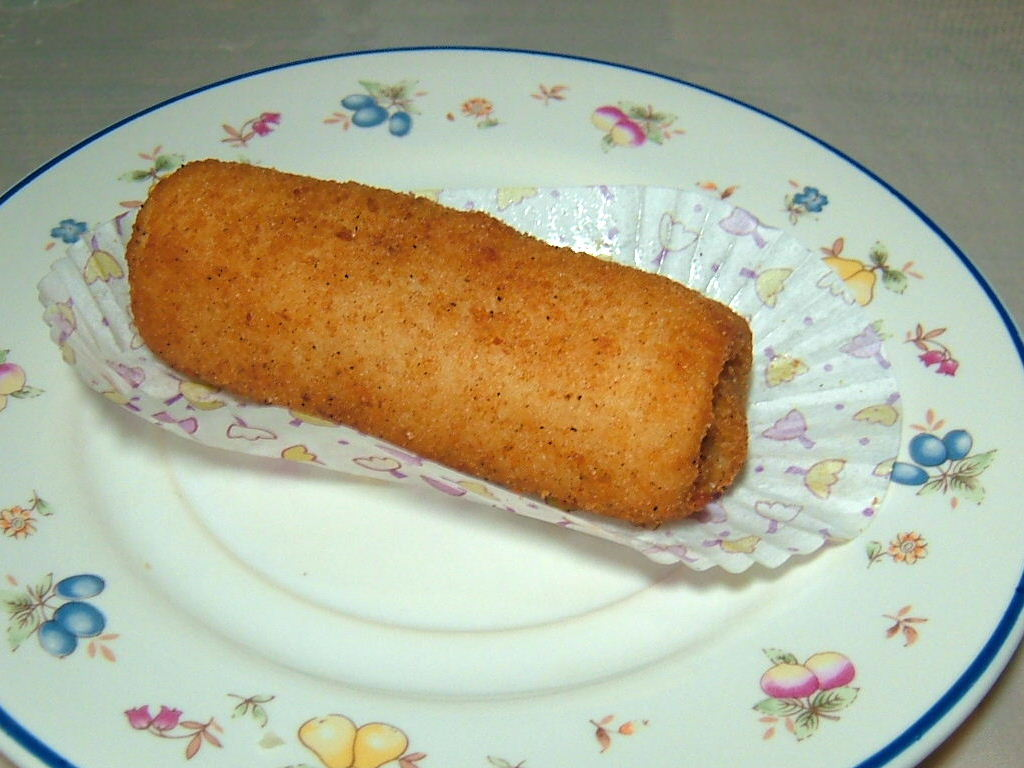
Rissole in Indonesia

=== India ===
Rissóis are a popular snack in Goa, India, introduced during the period of Portuguese rule and reflecting enduring Portuguese culinary influence. The most common variety found in Goa is rissóis de camarão, which is filled with a seasoned prawn mixture. Sausage-filled rissóis, known locally as rissóis de chorizo, are prepared using a spiced Goan sausage known as choris, while versions made with meat filling are referred to as rissóis de carne. Vegetarian variations are also common and are typically filled with cheese, spinach, mushroom, or corn.

== See also ==
- Croquette
- Empanada
- Faggot
- Frikadeller
- Jamaican patty
- Kjøttkake
- Kofta
