= Frikadelle =

Flat, pan-fried meatballs

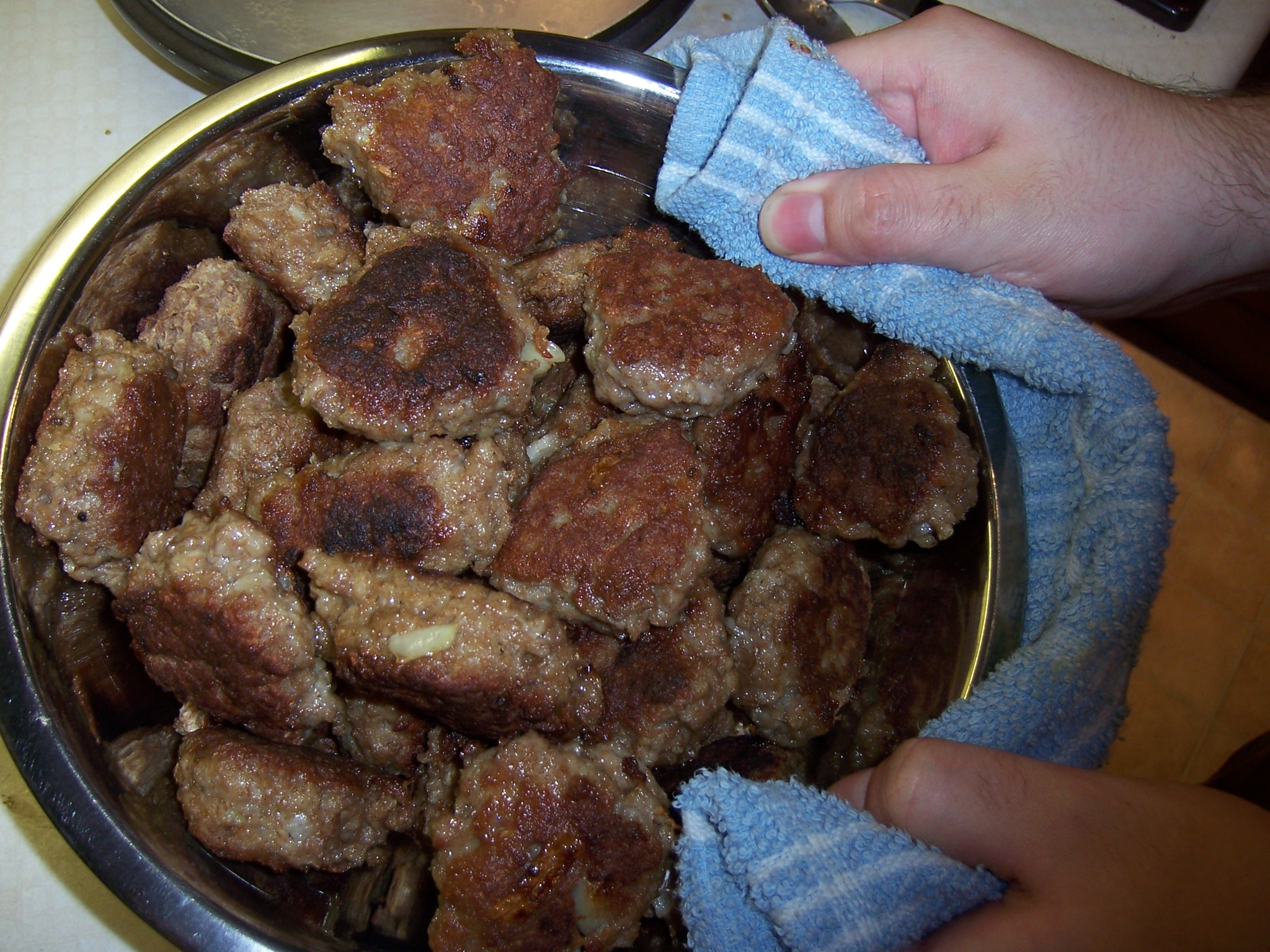
- A freshly made batch of Frikadelles
- Place of origin: Uncertain; supposedly Denmark or Germany
- Serving temperature: Hot or cold
- Main ingredients: Pork, veal, lamb, beef or fish
- Other information: Generally served with boiled potatoes with gravy, or creamed cabbage

A Frikadelle (Note: In German, Frikadelle is pronounced [fʁikaˈdɛlə], plural: Frikadellen. In Danish, frikadelle is pronounced [fʁεkəˈtεlə], plural: frikadeller.) is a rounded, flat-bottomed, pan-fried meatball of ground meat, often likened to the German version of meatballs. The origin of the dish is unknown. The term Frikadelle is German, but the dish is associated with German, Nordic, and Eastern European cuisines. They are one of the most popular meals in Poland, where they are known as kotlety mielone (literally "ground cutlets") or regionally sznycle ("schnitzels").

Various local variants of frikadelle are served throughout Scandinavia, as both a main course and a side dish. In Sweden, the word frikadeller refers to meatballs that are boiled, not pan-fried.

Varieties of frikadelle are also popular across Ukraine, Russia and other countries within the territories of the former Russian Empire and USSR, where they are referred to as kotlety (cyrillic котлети, котлеты). These are commonly made with beef and closely resemble German and Polish versions, but can also be made with pork, veal, chicken or even fish, with a famous chicken-based variety being Pozharsky cutlet. A related but less similar dish is Chicken Kiev, known as kotlety po-Kiyvsky in Ukraine and Russia. At the same time, the word frikadelky (фрикадельки) is reserved for the boiled or steamed varieties and is similar to Swedish frikadeller.

== Etymology ==
The origin of the word is uncertain. According to the Etymologisches Wörterbuch des Deutschen, the noun Frikadelle (pl. Frikadellen) can be found at the end of the 17th century in German and is related to the French noun fricandeau, and the Latin verb frīgere ("to roast" or "to fry").

The name of the dish in German is famously variable, with at least 16 recorded regional variants including Boulette/Bulette, Bratklops, Fleischpflanzerl, Fleischlaberl, Fleischküchle and Grilletta/Grillette as well as the Austrian Faschiertes Laibchen. It may be derived from fricandeau de veau, a dish of sliced veal, larded with pork fat. In the Dictionnaire des dictionnaires (1837) fricadelle is defined as, "In Belgium, a ball of ground, cooked meat" and a separate word, fricadèle, is defined as fricandeau. And in Phillips's New World of Words (1706) it is defined as "Fricandoe, a sort of Scotch collops made of thin slices of Veal, well larded and stuff'd." The Oxford English Dictionary defines fricandele (variation fricadelle) as a "quasi-French form of fricandeau".

== Other variations ==
=== Denmark ===
In Denmark, traditionally, they are made from a blend of two meats, typically ground veal, pork, or beef. The meat is added to chopped onions, eggs, milk (or water), bread crumbs (or oatmeal or flour), salt, and pepper. They are then formed into balls by using a tablespoon to get the right size frikadelle and flattened somewhat. They are then pan-fried in pork fat or beef fat, or more commonly in modern times in butter, margarine, or even vegetable oil.

As a main dish, they are most often served with boiled white potatoes and brown sauce accompanied by pickled beetroot or cooked red cabbage. Alternatively, they can be served with creamed, white cabbage. Frikadeller are also eaten on rugbrød with red cabbage or pickle slices as a traditional Danish smørrebrød. The combination of frikadeller and a cold potato salad is very popular at picnics or potlucks, due to the ease of transporting either component after cooking.

Another popular variation is fiskefrikadeller, which replaces the meat in the recipe with fish. The fiskefrikadeller are typically prepared with cod, though may sometimes include salmon as well, and are often served with remoulade.

=== Indonesia ===
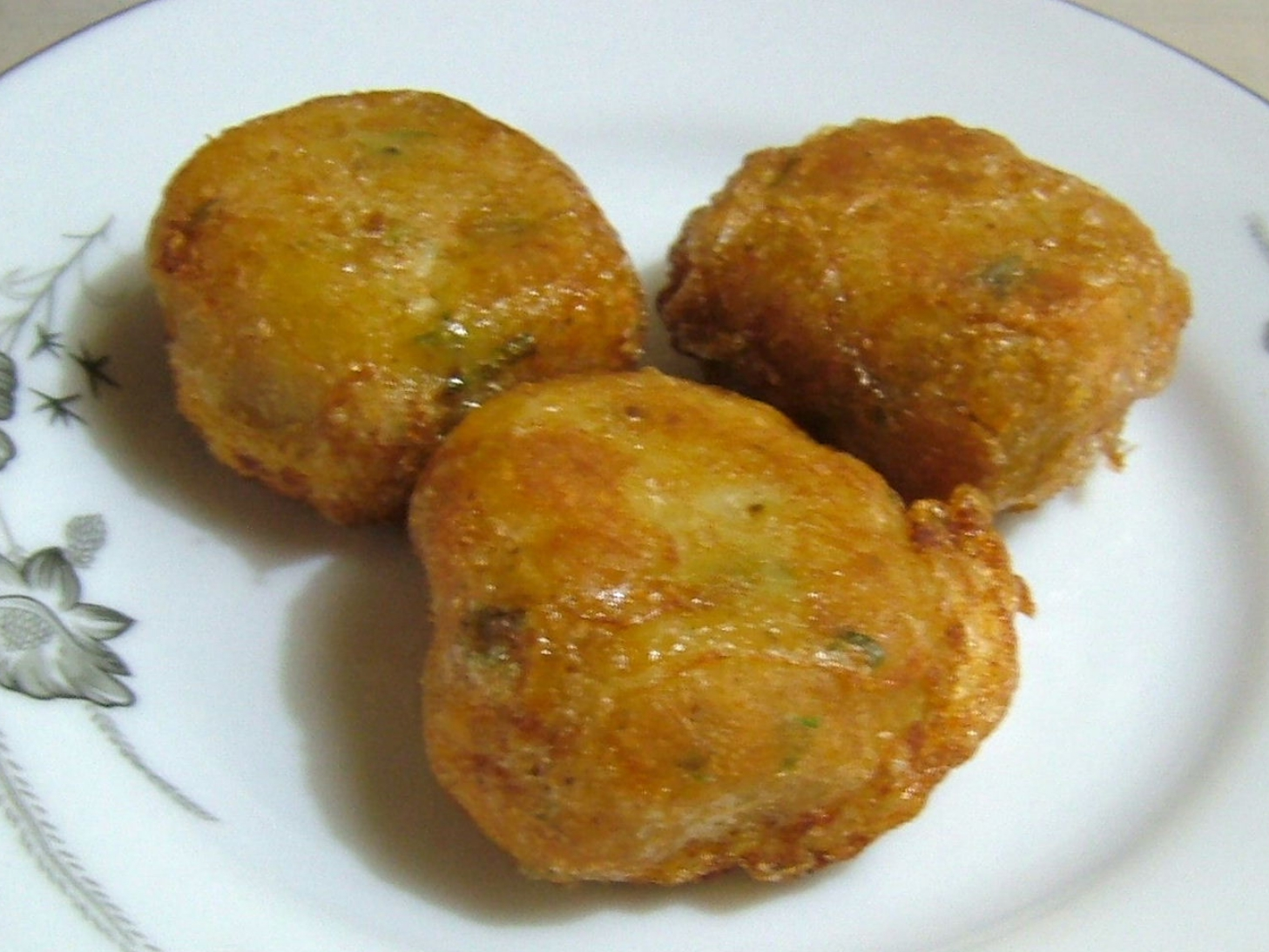
Perkedel, an Indonesian version derived from the Dutch frikadel. This is historically similar to the frikadeller using potato.

Frikadelle are also known in Indonesian cuisine through Dutch cuisine (of the frikadel, which is historically similar to the frikadeller) influence and called perkedel, however the main ingredient is not meat, but mashed potato, sometimes slightly mixed with ground meat or corned beef. The mixture is then shaped into flat, round patties and dipped in egg yolk before being deep fried. Other than mashed potato, cabe rawit, spring onion, shrimp, peeled corn, or mashed tofu fritters are also common as perkedel ingredients.

=== South Africa ===
Frikkedelle is also popular in most traditional South African cuisine like the Cape Malay and Boer, with both British and German influence from the early settlers. Frikadelle is not only pan-fried, but often baked in the oven to give it a crisp outside with a tender and juicy inside. It is served with side dishes of a starch like rice, samp, "pap," or mashed potatoes, accompanied by vegetables and or salad.

== See also ==
- Kofta
- Faggot (food)
- Hamburg steak
- Hamburger
- Chapli kabab
- Shami kebab
- Patty
- Salisbury steak
- Skilpadjies
- Swedish meatball
- Dry meatballs
- Tteok-galbi
