= Ciğer kebabı =

Skewered meat dish

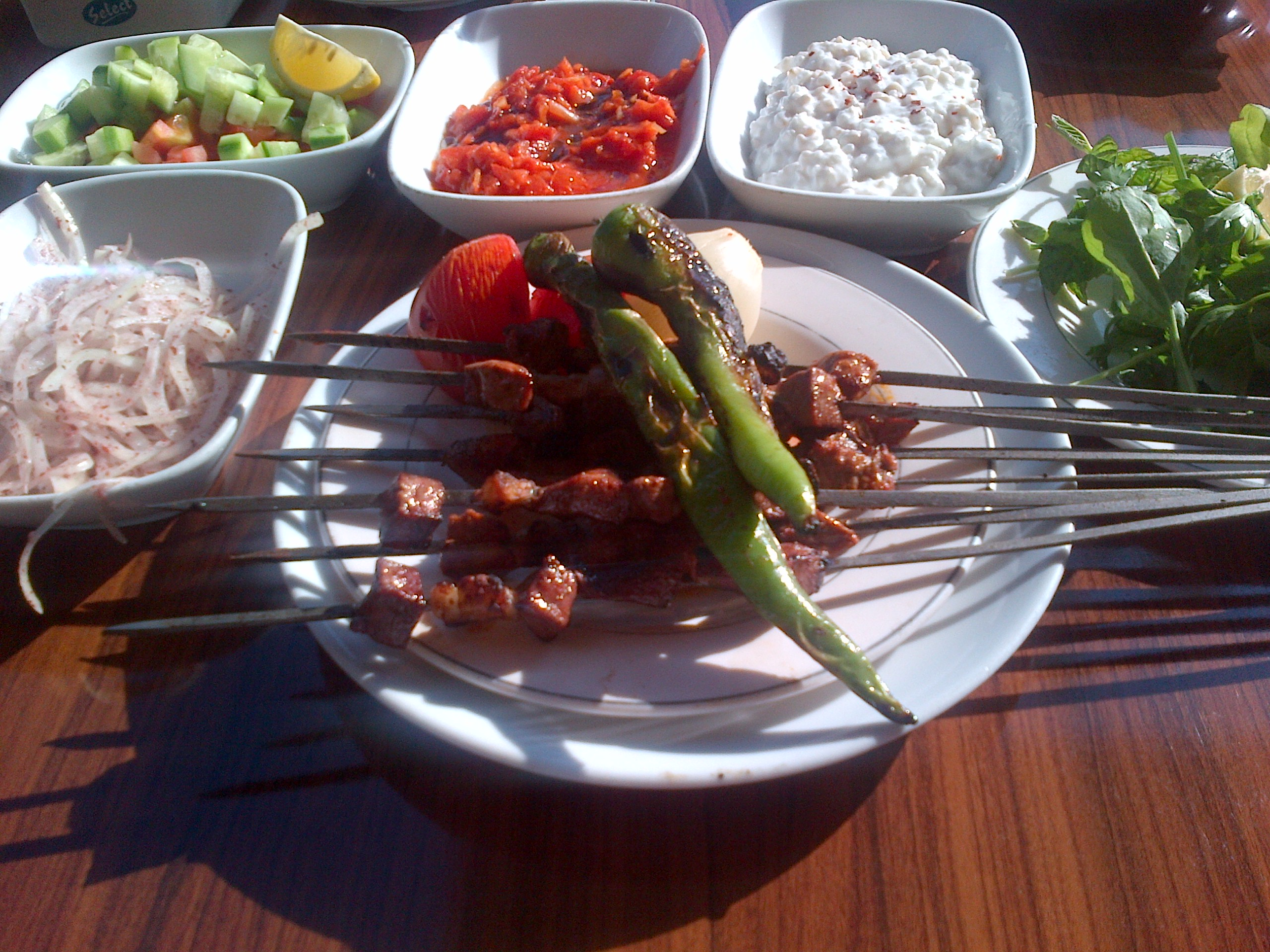
- Ciğer kebab on a plate with accompanying vegetables.
- Course: Kebab
- Place of origin: Turkey
- Main ingredients: Marinated slices of liver with onion, green pepper and other vegetables
- Similar dishes: Boulfaf; Rumaki; Skilpadjies

Ciğer kebabı (English: liver kebab) is a common type of skewered meat served in Anatolian cuisine, usually eaten with sliced onions, salad and bread.

Liver is served in different ways, and can be found on its own as a main course in a sizzling plate, or as a kebab on shish skewers. Ciğer kebab has been registered that it belongs to Diyarbakır.

In Antep cuisine from the city of Gaziantep, the liver is often placed into lavaş bread with the option of adding mint, peppers and other complements. The dish is often eaten for breakfast in Diyarbakır and Gaziantep.
