= Lungs as food =

Type of offal

Lungs (colloquially lights) of game or livestock are a variety of offal used in cooking and butchery.

Lungs are rarely used in English-speaking culinary traditions, with the exception of the Scottish national dish haggis, and English and Welsh faggots.

In Malaysia, slices of beef lung (paru, literally "lung" in Malay) are coated in flour and turmeric powder, deep-fried, and sold in packets at street markets. These are a very popular snack eaten with chilli sauce and a dash of vinegar.

Bopis (Spanish: bópiz) is a piquant Philippine dish of pork or beef lungs and heart sautéed in tomatoes, chilies and onions.

== See also ==
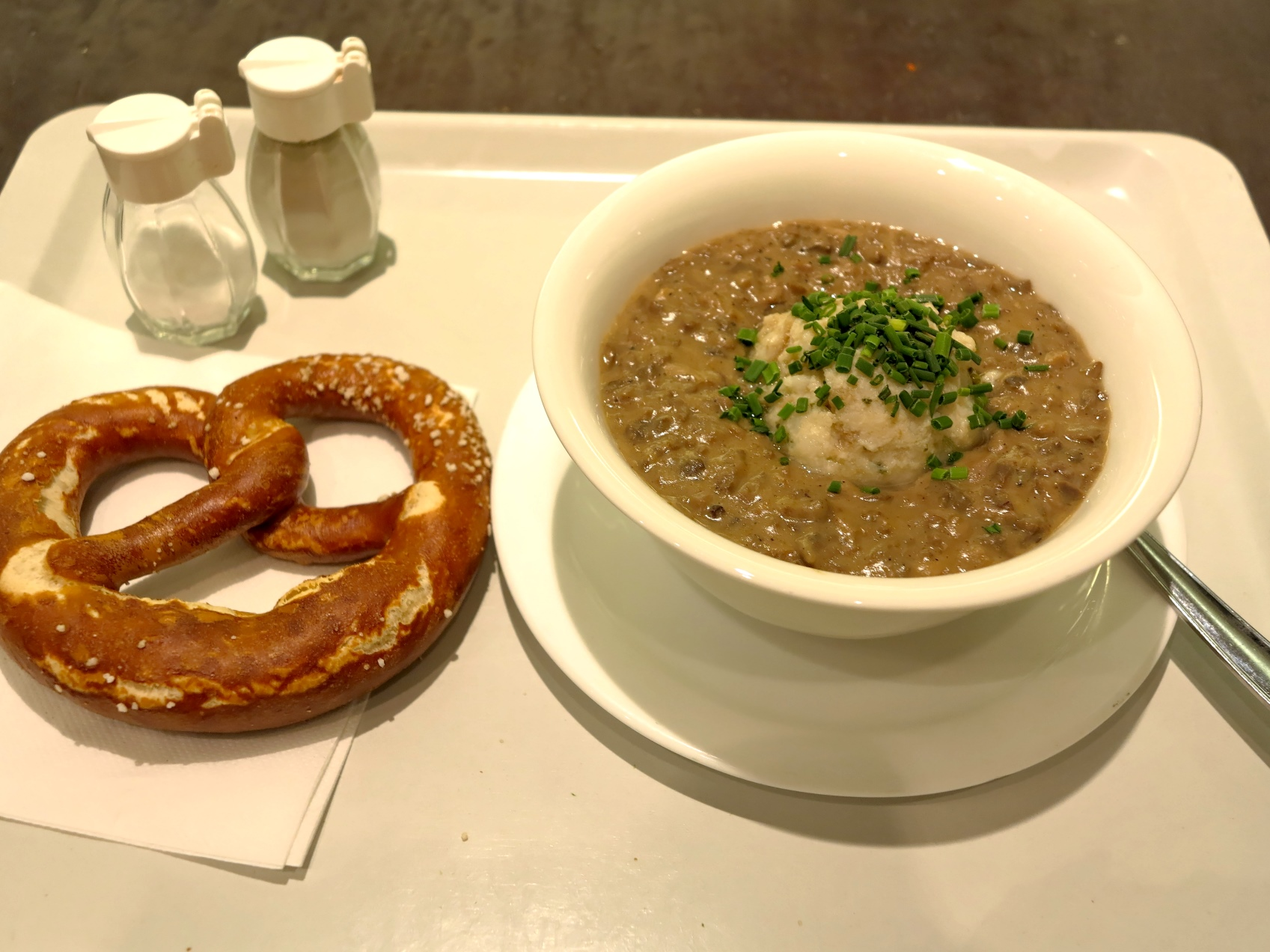
Saures Lüngerl: savoury ragout of pork lungs with bread dumpling

- Mutton
- Veal
- Venison

== Notes and references ==
=== Notes ===
- Pig’s Liver (Includes lights) Mrs Beeton’s Book of Household Management. 1861.
- The River Cottage Meat Book. Hugh Fearnley-Whittingstall. 2007.

=== References ===
- Fotobank Veal Lungs (in Russian)
- Offal of the week:Lungs
