= Kourdass =

Dried, salted and seasoned sheep innards

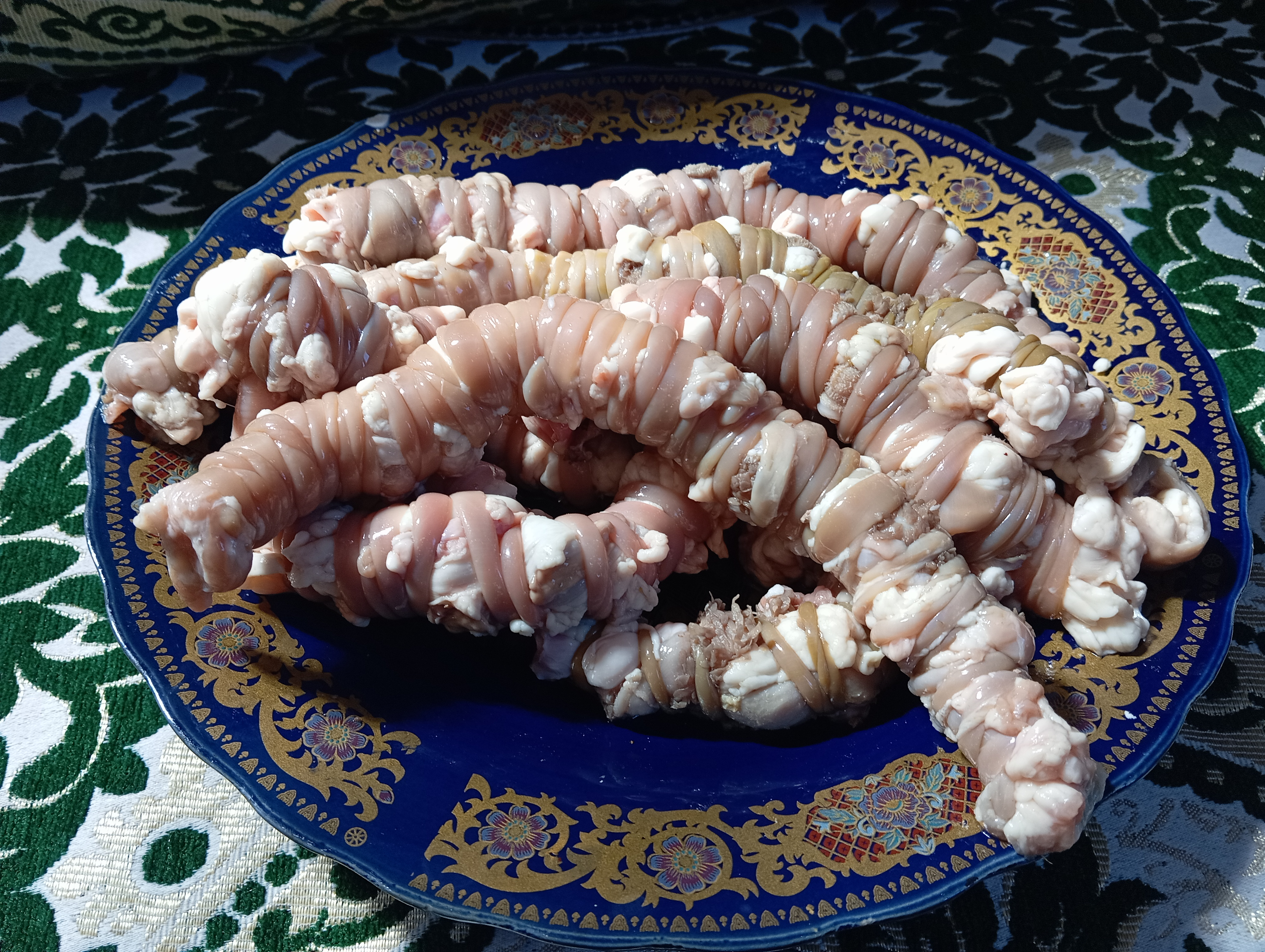
- Place of origin: Morocco
- Associated cuisine: Moroccan cuisine
- Serving temperature: Hot
- Main ingredients: Lamb offal, salt
- Ingredients generally used: Cumin; Saffron; Garlic; Red pepper; Black pepper; Coriander

Kourdass is a Moroccan and Algerian food similar to sausage made with lamb offal that is salted, marinated, sun-dried, then boiled. It is served for special events like weddings, festivals, Moussem, and Ashura.

== Preparation ==
It is prepared by cutting up lamb offal, particularly the fat, intestines, spleen, lungs, liver and stomach. These pieces are salted, seasoned, and marinated overnight. Seasonings can include cumin, hot red pepper, garlic, saffron, coriander, and black pepper. After seasoning, the mixture is put into a washed piece of lamb stomach and wrapped in intestine to be sun-dried for 15 to 20 days. Kourdass is cooked by boiling and can be further cooked by grilling or frying. It may be served alongside traditional dishes like couscous.

Kourdass is typically prepared in early winter so it can be preserved before the rainy season. It is often sun-dried on terraces in the morning and brought inside during the evening.

== Cultural significance ==
Kourdass is served at weddings, festivals, and during Moussem and Ashura. It originates from the Islamic holiday of Eid al-Adha, the day it is believed Abraham sacrificed a ram to Allah. In honor of this, an animal such as a goat, sheep, cow or camel is traditionally sacrifriced to Allah. A third of the meat is eaten by the family, a third is kept for later, and a third is donated to the poor. Cured meat dishes such as kourdass are used to preserve the last of the remaining meat. The saved meat is served to family and friends when gathering for lunch on Ashura; this is a significant day in Islam when Moses was saved from the Pharaoh by Allah parting the sea.

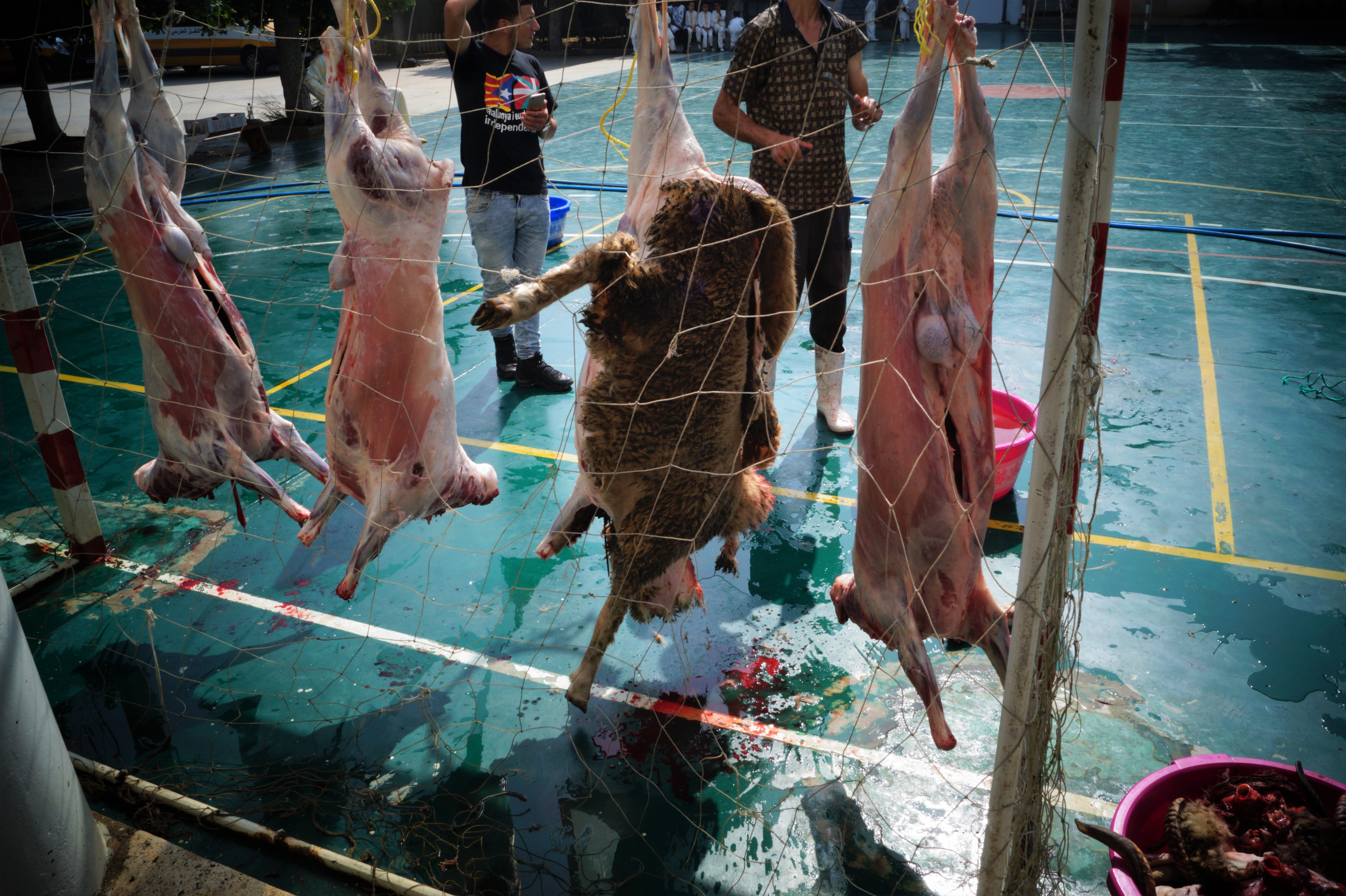
Animals sacrificed during Eid al-Adha in Casablanca, Morocco

== See also ==
- Boulfaf, a Moroccan liver kebab eaten on Eid al-Adha
