= Tehane =

Moroccan spleen dish

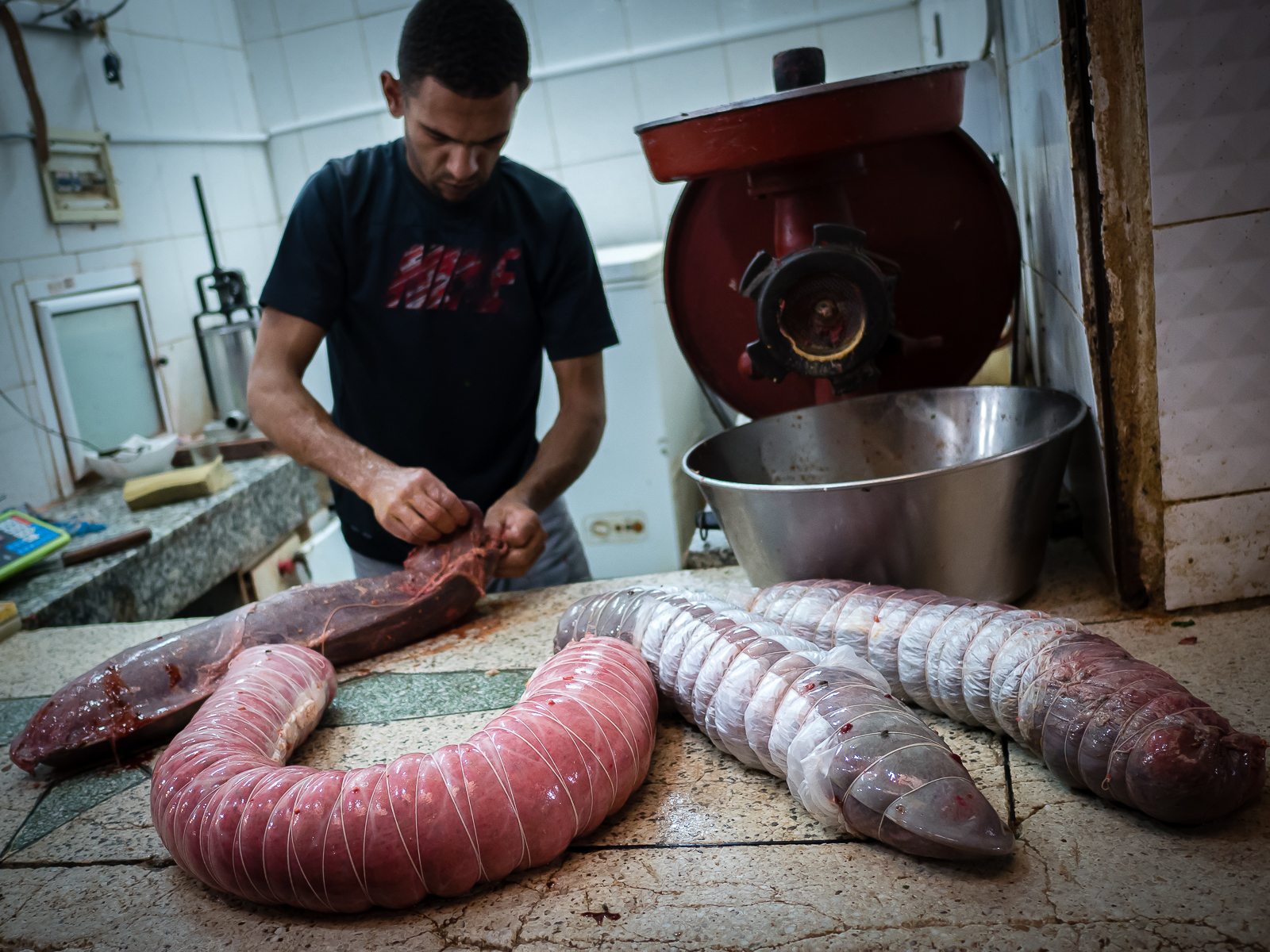
- Preparation of stuffed beef spleen
- Alternative names: tehane/tihane, tihal
- Type: Offal
- Place of origin: Morocco
- Associated cuisine: Moroccan cuisine; Mizrahi Jewish cuisine
- Created by: Moroccan Jews
- Main ingredients: Spleen (Dromedary camel, cow), kefta
- Ingredients generally used: Harissa, preserved lemon, olives, eggs, suet/camel hump
- Variations: Sandwich, with pita

Tehane (Moroccan Arabic, also tihane, lit. 'spleen' — synecdoche; Arabic: الطحال, tihal or tehal; French: rate farcie à la viande hachée) or stuffed spleen is a delicacy of Morocco, made from a baked spleen stuffed with kefta and other ingredients. Dromedary camel spleen is traditionally used, but cow spleen is also used. Stuffed spleen is a popular street food in souks in Fez and Marrakesh, like Fes el Bali and Jemaa el-Fnaa.

== History ==
Stuffed spleen originated in the Moroccan Jewish community.

The dish is a popular home cooking dish during Eid Al-Adha, after the festival's ritual animal sacrifice finds families with ample meat and offal.

== Preparation and consumption ==
Tehane is a fresh meat product of over 20% moisture by volume. North African traditional fresh meat products have a significant chance of foodborne illness due to lack of livestock veterinary care, unsanitary butchering, and lack of oversight in small facilities. However, tehane is a fully cooked meat product, lowering chance of illness.

The spleen is split and stuffed with kefta, fat - typically suet or camel hump - and egg. The stuffing is heavily spiced, including harissa, preserved lemons and olives. The spleen is sewn closed and traditionally baked in a communal oven (ferran).

The finished tehane is baked to a dark color and creamy internal texture. Tehane is served in slices, usually griddled, and either served over rice or as a sandwich in a pita.

== See also ==
- Pani câ meusa, Sicilian spleen sandwich
- Boulfaf
