= Skilpadjies =

South African lamb's liver dish

- Alternative names: muise, vlermuise
- Type: Braai (barbecue)
- Place of origin: South Africa
- Main ingredients: lamb, caul fat, coriander, chopped onion, salt and Worcestershire sauce
- Similar dishes: Boulfaf; Ciğer kebabı; Rumaki

Skilpadjies is a traditional South African food, also known by other names such as muise and vlermuise.

The dish is lamb's liver wrapped in the fatty membrane that surrounds the kidneys. (African: netvet, meaning caul fat). Most cooks mince the liver, add coriander, chopped onion, as well as salt and Worcestershire sauce. Balls made of this compounded mixture are mixed with the netvet and secured with culinary fixtures for structure, for example, by using a toothpick. The balls, approximately 80 mm (3.1 in) in diameter, are normally barbecued and are ready when the fat is crisp.

Dishes such as skilpadjies had already been made by the ancient Romans and the German recipe for calf's liver in caul fat appears in the book "Das Buoch von guoter Spise". In the United Kingdom, a similar dish called faggots (pork faggots for example) is prepared using caul fat, meat, and other ingredients.

The names skilpadjie (little tortoise), muise (mice), vlermuise (bats) and pofadder (puff adder) reflect its appearance. Pofadder is the largest version, the size of a large sausage. It is made from minced lamb's liver wrapped in a large piece of netvet, and is usually served at parties where about 8 to 10 servings can be sliced from one pofadder when grilled.

It is a very rich, high-cholesterol and fatty food. The consumers of skilpadjies normally eat starchy food (in the form of mealie pap or toasted bread) with the skilpadjies, to not fall victim to overindulgence.

== See also ==
- List of African dishes
  - Boerewors
  - Injera
- Steak
  - Pork steak and faggots
- List of lamb or meatball dishes
- Meat chop and meat on the bone
