= Calf's liver and bacon =

British dish of veal and pork

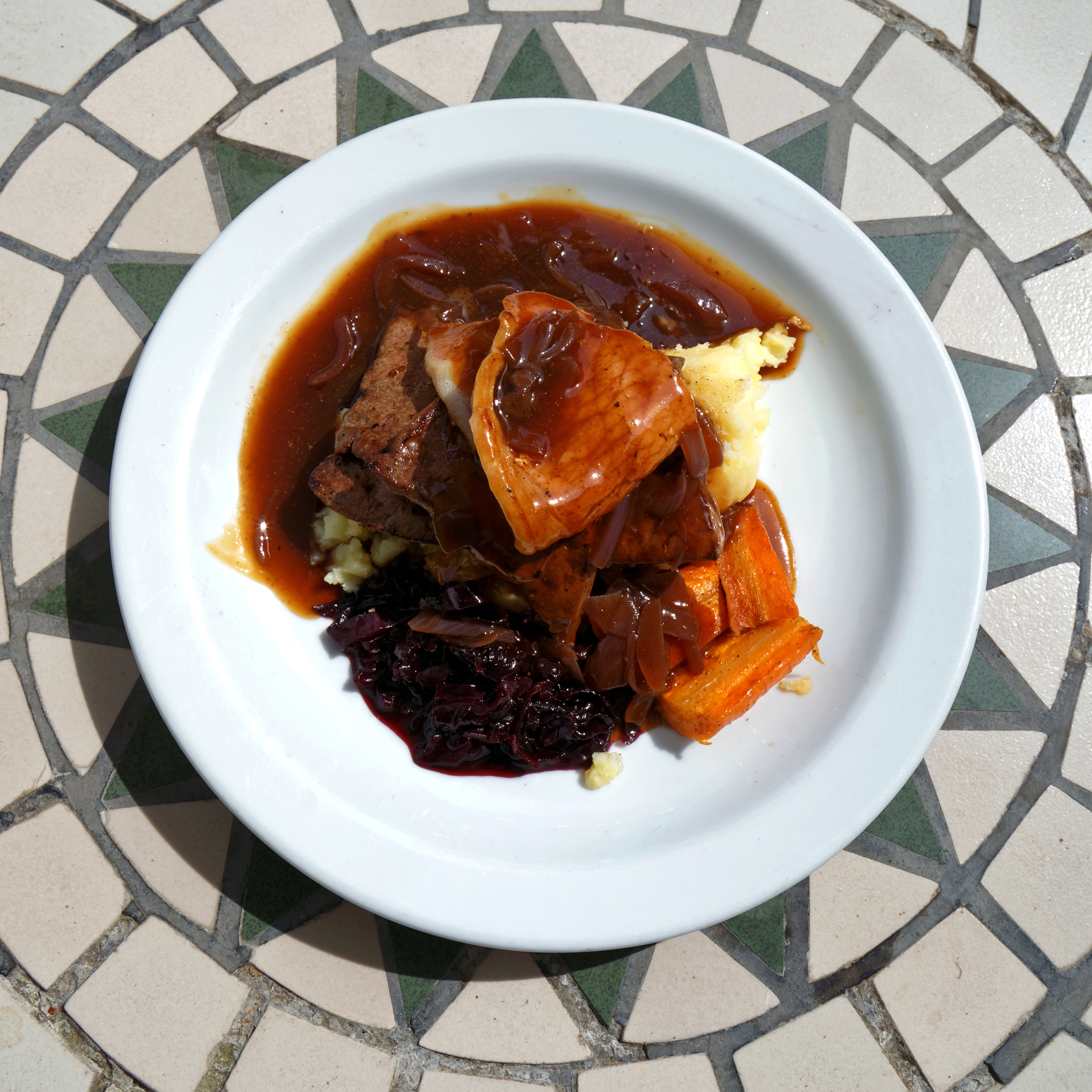
- Calf's liver and bacon with mashed potatoes, red cabbage, carrots, and onion gravy
- Place of origin: Britain
- Main ingredients: liver, bacon

Calf's liver and bacon is a savoury dish containing veal (calf's liver) and pork (bacon). It is found in British recipes from the eighteenth century and has become popular in anglophone countries, though less so in French and Italian cuisine.

Most modern recipes differ from those of 1733 and 1780 in specifying that the bacon is fried first and the liver is then sautéed in the bacon fat before the two ingredients are combined and served. In a nineteenth-century American variant the liver and bacon are baked in an oven and served with a cream sauce.

== History ==
A recipe for the dish is given in Sara Harrison's The House-keeper's Pocket Book, published in London in 1733. Her recipe was reproduced, with more detailed cooking instructions, in Eliza Price's The New Book of Cookery, or, Every Woman a Perfect Cook in 1780. The dish is featured in several English cookery books of the nineteenth century, including Cookery Made Easy (1825), and The Domestic Oracle (1826). It appears in cookery books from Ireland (1825), Scotland (1826), the US (1857), and Australia (1864). In the first edition of Mrs Beeton's Book of Household Management (1861), it is mentioned five times in different suggested menus.

Eighteenth-century recipes for the dish

Xavier Raskin, in his 1922 The French Chef in Private American Families, suggested that the dish was French in origin, but bacon (lard maigre fumé) does not play a large part in traditional French cookery, and according to Larousse Gastronomique, calf's liver with bacon is known in France as "English style" – foie de veau à l'anglaise. (Note: Some British chefs using French terms for their dishes label the dish not as "foie de veau à l'anglaise" but as "foie de veau au lard". Other French dishes containing calf's liver and pork meat include foie de veau à l' américaine (American style), which is identical to foie de veau à l' anglaise with the addition of fried tomatoes, and one version of foie de veau à la bordelaise (Bordeaux style), which consists of flash-fried slices of Bayonne ham served with fried slices of calf's liver and bordelaise sauce.) Auguste Escoffier included it under that name in his Le guide culinaire (1903).

Calf's liver (fegato di vitello) is much featured in Italian cooking, but neither Elizabeth David in Italian Food (1954) nor Gillian Riley in The Oxford Companion to Italian Food (2009) includes bacon in any liver dish mentioned. Nonetheless, in the US and Britain, calf's liver with bacon (or with guanciale, an approximate equivalent) is on the menu in some Italian restaurants.

For at least one American restaurant, calf's liver and bacon became a signature dish: in 1925, the Homestead Tea Room in St. Petersburg, Florida, took out a full-page press advertisement extolling its version of the dish. Although usually a lunch or dinner dish, calf's liver and bacon was sometimes served as a breakfast dish, both for upper-class house parties in Britain and in American hotels.

== Preparation ==
The essentials of the dish have not changed since Sara Harrison's 1733 recipe: slices of bacon and slices of calf's liver (often covered in flour) are fried separately. Early recipes suggest frying the liver first and then the bacon; later recipes recommend frying the bacon first and then cooking the liver in the residual fat. The bacon and slices of liver are placed in a dish and possibly covered with a gravy. Two modern textbooks for trainee chefs recommend either beurre noisette or jus lié. But in The White House Cook Book (1887), Hugo Ziemann and Fanny Gillette, give an alternative: the raw sliced liver has boiling water poured over it and is then put in a pan with slices of salt pork or bacon, pepper and salt and is baked in an oven and served with a cream or milk gravy poured over it. Some recipes suggest garnishing with parsley; Marco Pierre White recommends deep-fried sage leaves instead.

It is important that the dish is served quickly, as the liver ought to be eaten when hot and tender.

According to a 2014 cookery book, a serving of calf's liver and bacon typically contains 233 calories, 23 g protein, 10 g carbohydrate, 11 g total fat (4 g saturated fat), 358 mg cholesterol and 331 mg sodium.

== Notes, references and sources ==
=== Sources ===
- Anon (1825). The Housewife's Guide. Belfast: Joseph Smyth. OCLC 969512833.
- Aristologist, Australian (1864). The English and Australian Cookery Book. London: Sampson, Low, Marston. OCLC 1040542365.
- Beeton, Isabella (1861). The Book of Household Management. London: S. O. Beeton. OCLC 1045333327.
- Beullac, Geneviève, ed. (2001). Larousse Gastronomique. New York: Clarkson Potter. ISBN 978-0-60-960971-2.
- Bickel, Walter (1989). Hering's Dictionary of Classical and Modern Cookery (eleventh ed.). London: Virtue. ISBN 978-3-8057-0307-9.
- Ceserani, Victor; Ronald Kinton (1972). Practical Cookery. London: Edward Arnold. ISBN 978-0-71-311713-4.
- David, Elizabeth (1987) [1954]. Italian Food. London: Penguin. ISBN 978-0-14-046841-0.
- Dods, Margaret (1826). The Cook and Housewife's Manual. Edinburgh: Dods. OCLC 559095492.
- Ellis, Rosemary (2014). The Good Housekeeping Cookbook: 1,275 Recipes From America's Favorite Test Kitchen. New York: Hearst Books. ISBN 978-1-61-837162-1.
- Escoffier, Auguste (1903). Le guide culinaire: aide-mémoire de cuisine pratiqué (in French). Paris: Art culinaire. OCLC 1202722258.
- Fuller, John; Edward Renold (1992). The Chef's Compendium of Professional Recipes. Oxford: Butterworth-Heinemann. ISBN 978-0-7506-0490-1.
- Green, Olive (1905). What to Have for Breakfast. G. P. Putnam's Sons. OCLC 1609505.
- Hale, Sarah (1857). Mrs Hale's New Cook Book. Philadelphia: T. B. Peterson. OCLC 1040566189.
- Harrison, Sara (1733). The House-Keeper's Pocket-Book. London: T. Worrall. OCLC 1264767123.
- L—, Major (1887). Breakfasts, Luncheons, and Ball Suppers. London: Chapman and Hall. OCLC 3685935.
- Mario, Thomas (1978). Quantity Cooking. New Delhi: Avi. ISBN 978-0-87055-497-1.
- Montagné, Prosper (1976). Larousse Gastronomique. London: Hamlyn. OCLC 1285641881.
- Murray, Alexander (1826). The Domestic Oracle. London: Fisher. OCLC 315781649.
- Price, Sara (1780). The New Book of Cookery, or, Every Woman a Perfect Cook. London: Alex Hogg. OCLC 1422373696.
- Raskin, Xavier (1922). The French Chef in Private American Families. Rand McNally. OCLC 609313923.
- Riley, Gillian (2009). The Oxford Companion to Italian Food. Oxford: Oxford University Press. ISBN 978-0-19-538710-0.
- Willis, Michael (1825). Cookery Made Easy. London: Orlando Hodgson. OCLC 969524285.
- Zagat, Nina; Tim Zagat (2008). America's 1,000 Top Italian Restaurants. New York: Zagat Survey. OCLC 1028039964.
- Ziemann, Hugo; Fanny Gillette (1887). The White House Cook Book. New York: Saalfield. OCLC 1355352119.
