= Caul fat =

Membrane around food animals' internal organs

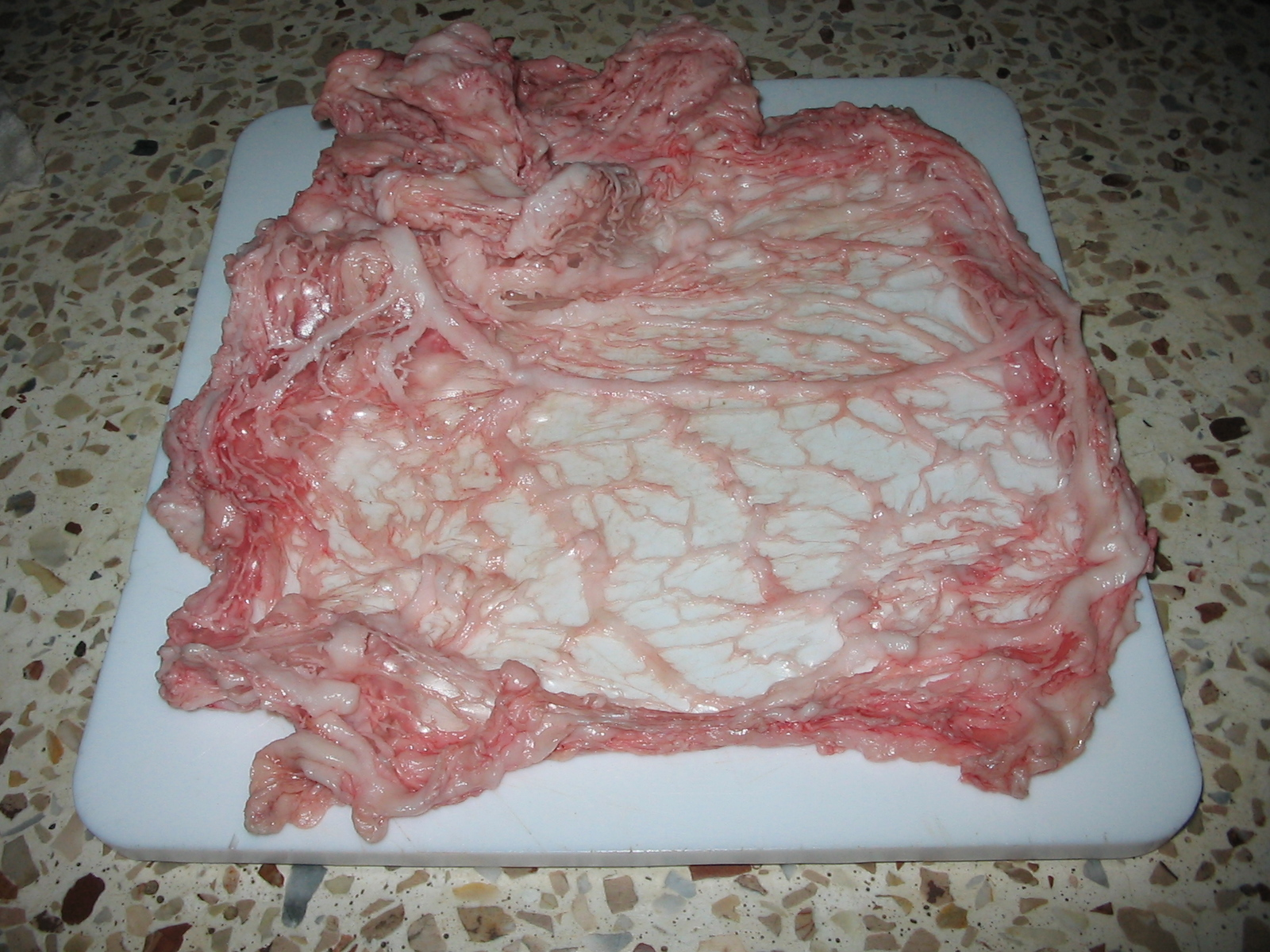
Pig's caul fat

Caul fat, also known as lace fat, omentum, crépine or fat netting, is the greater omentum used as offal: the lace-like, fatty membrane which surrounds the internal organs of some animals, such as cows, sheep, and pigs. It is used as a casing for sausages, roulades, pâtés, and various other meat dishes.

== Examples of caul fat dishes ==
- atriau
- bò nướng mỡ chài
- boulfaf
- crépinette
- drob sarma
- pork faggots
- fegatelli
- plućna maramica and trbušna maramica
- sheftalia
- skilpadjies

In the traditional Ukrainian and Russian cuisine, caul fat, known as salnik or salnyk, was usually filled with kasha and liver, and baked in a clay pot in the Russian oven.

The Navajo people of the Southwestern United States wrap sheep intestines around strips of caul fat to make a dish called ach'ii'.

== Gallery ==
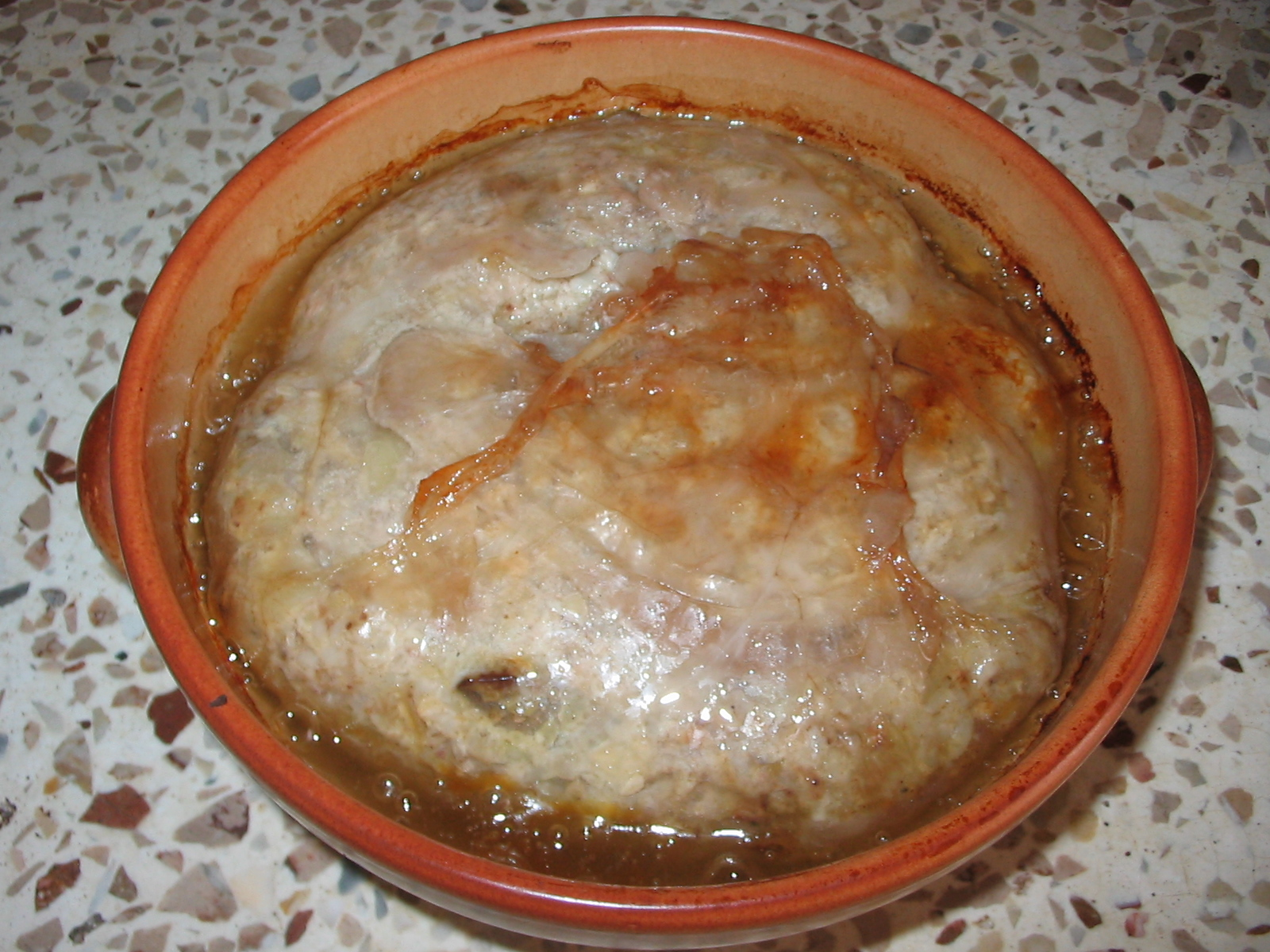
Salnyk

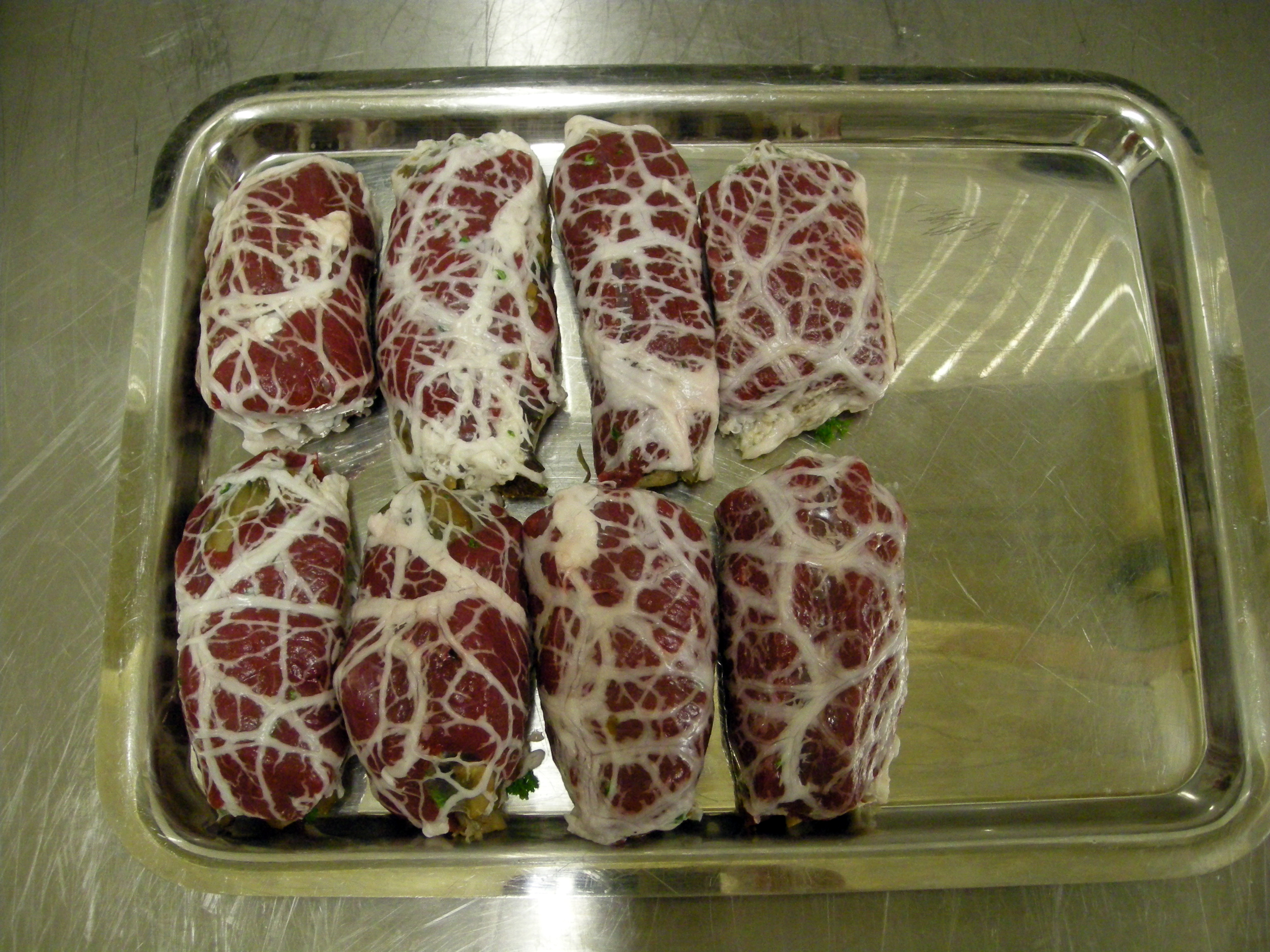
Ostrich crépinette

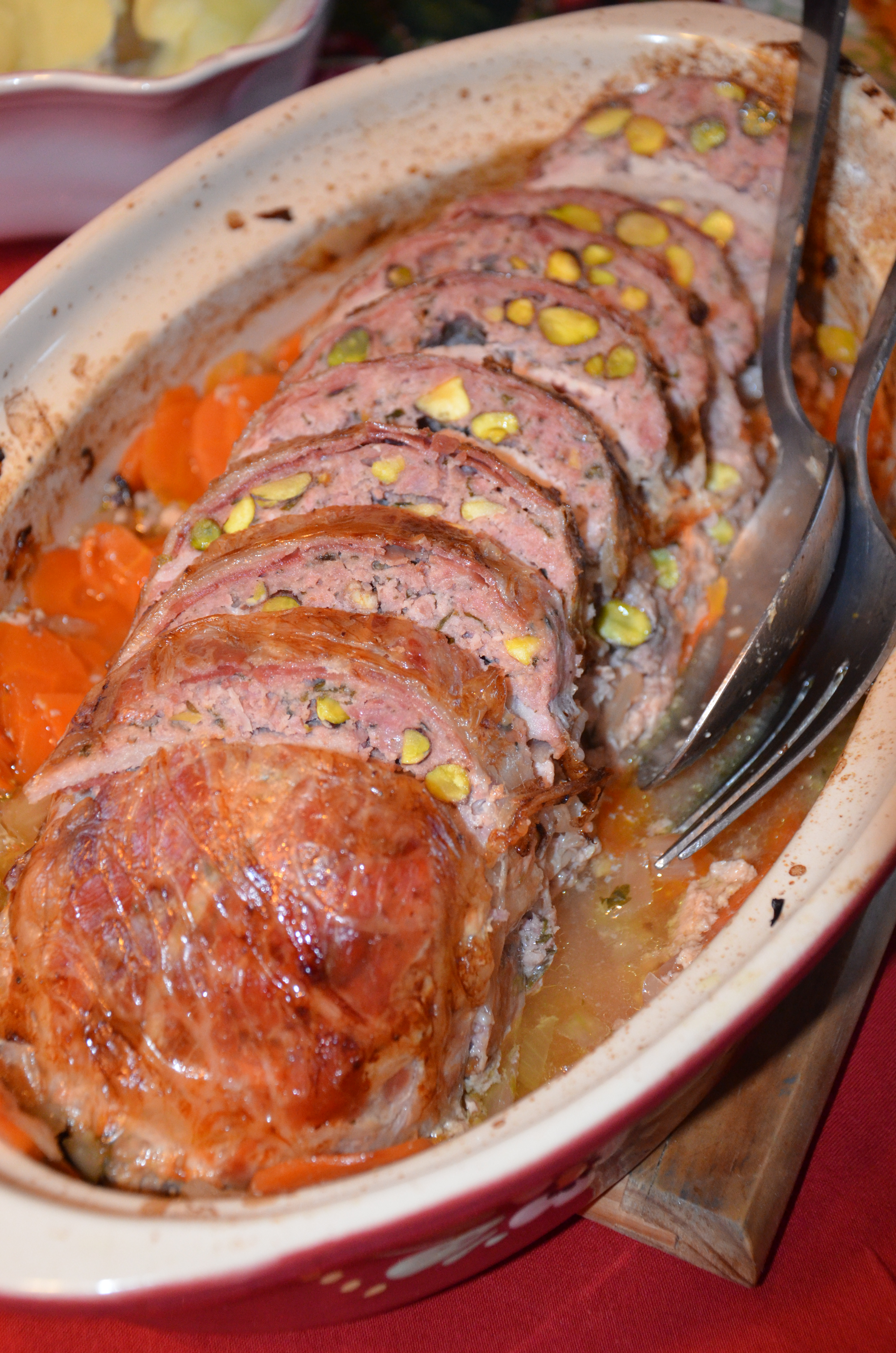
French veal sausage bundle (Feuilleton de veau)

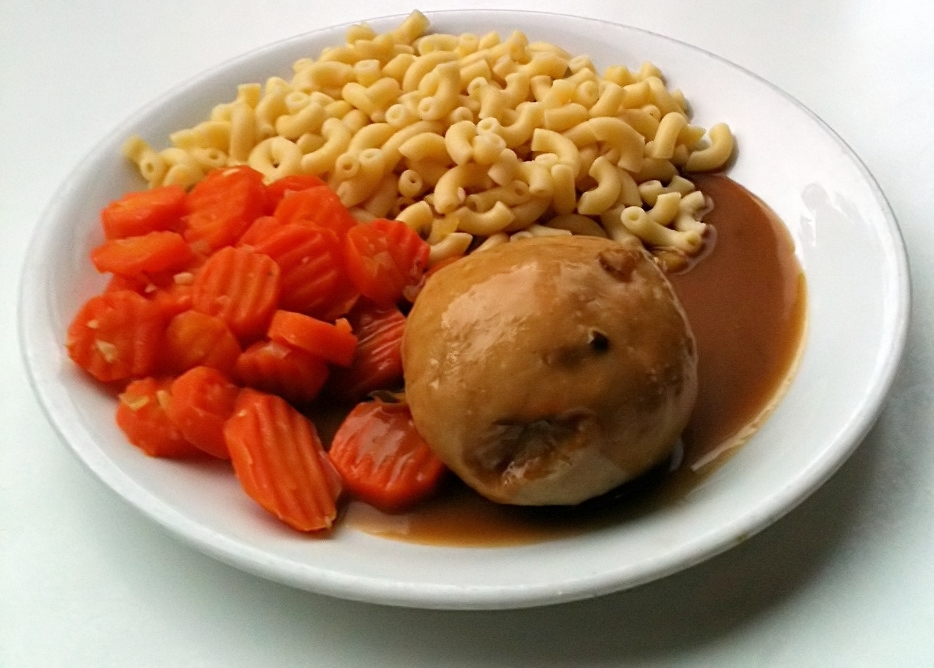
Atriau served with pasta and carrots
