= Faggot (food) =

Traditional dish in the United Kingdom

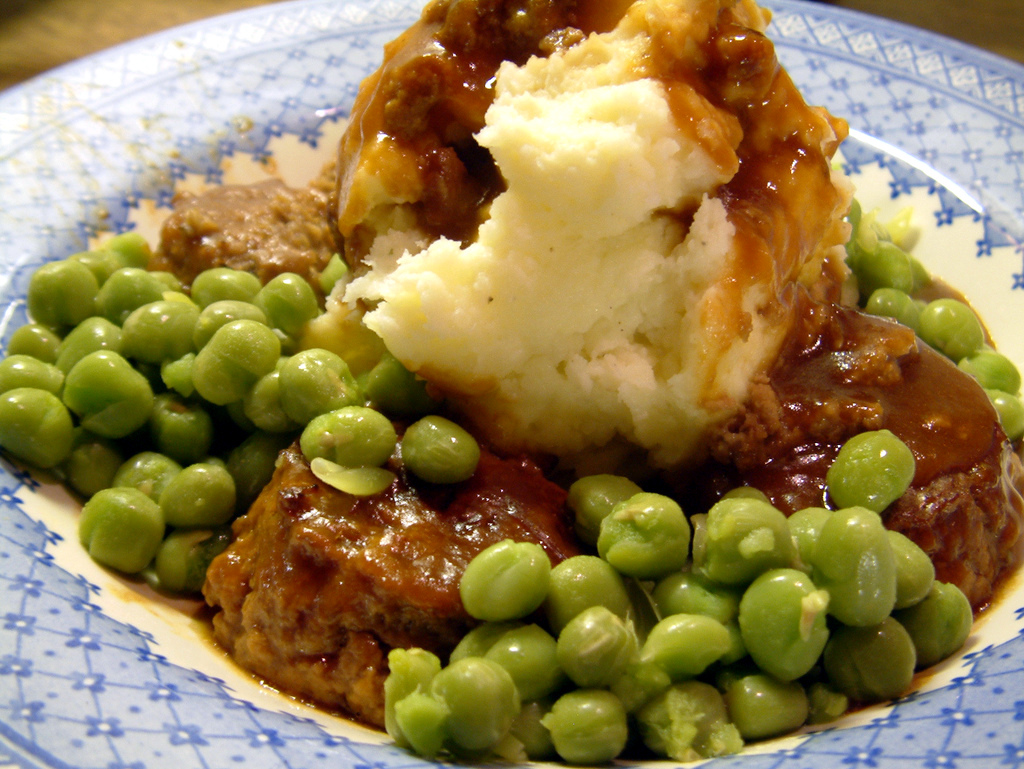
- Faggots, gravy, mashed potatoes and marrowfat peas
- Type: Meatball
- Course: Main dish
- Place of origin: United Kingdom
- Region or state: England and Wales
- Serving temperature: Hot
- Main ingredients: Pig's heart and liver, wrapped in caul fat or bacon
- Variations: Pig fry

Faggots, or savoury ducks, are meatballs made from minced off-cuts and offal (especially pork, and traditionally pig's heart, liver and fatty belly meat or bacon) mixed with herbs and sometimes bread crumbs. It is a traditional dish in the United Kingdom, especially South and Mid Wales and the English Midlands.

Faggots originated as a traditional cheap food consumed by country people in Western England, particularly west Wiltshire and the West Midlands. Their popularity spread from there, especially to South Wales in the mid-nineteenth century, when many agricultural workers left the land to work in the rapidly expanding industry and mines of that area.

The alternative name "savoury ducks" is regional to Yorkshire, Lincolnshire and Lancashire. The first reference to savoury ducks in print was in the Manchester Courier on Saturday 3 June 1843.

== Preparation and serving ==
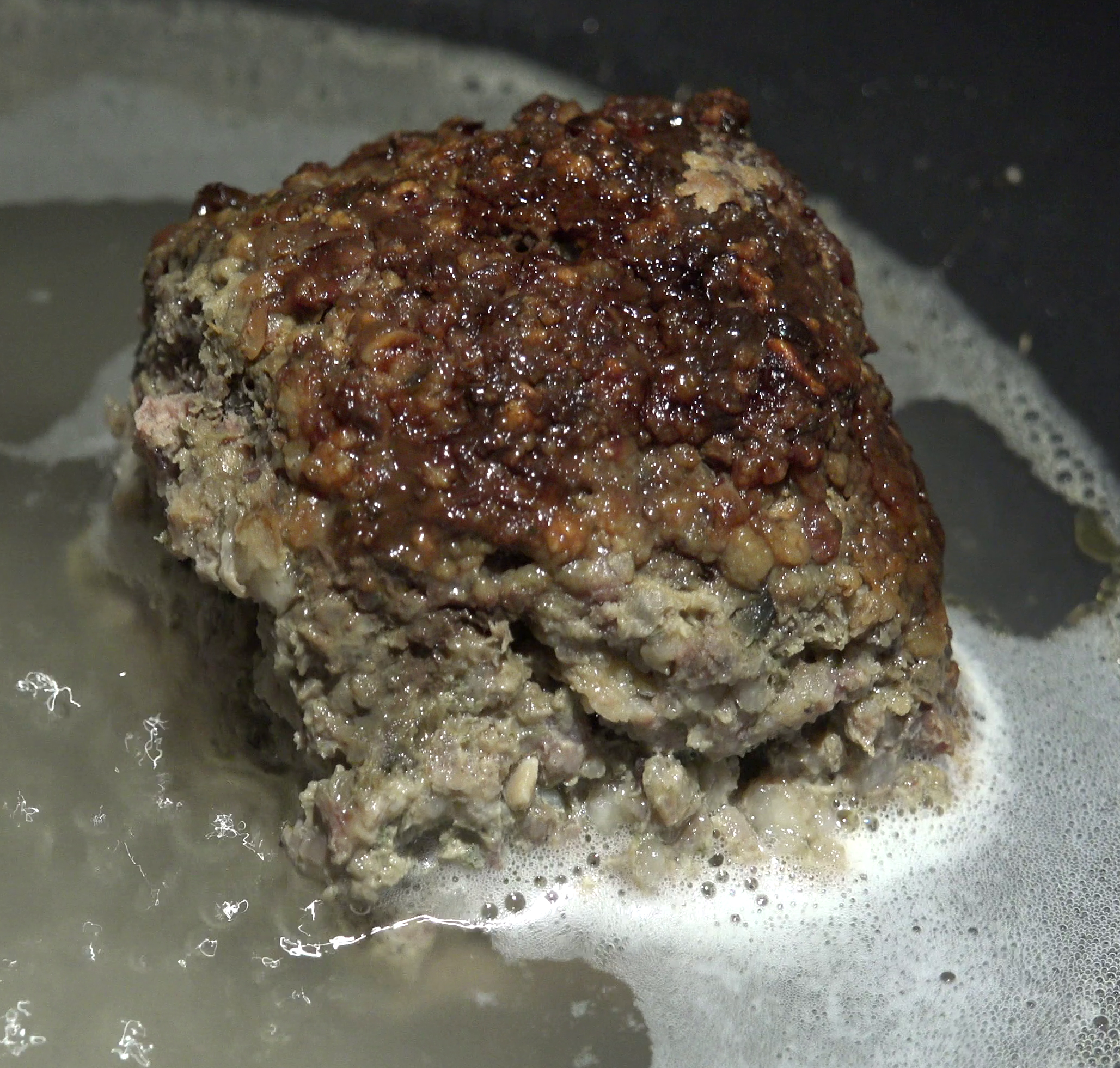
A faggot being cooked

Commonly, a faggot consists of minced pork liver and heart, with onion and breadcrumbs. The mixture is shaped by hand into small balls, wrapped with caul fat (the omentum membrane from the pig's kidney) and baked. Faggots may also be made with beef. Another variation of the faggot is pig's fry (testicles) wrapped in pig's caul: the pig's fry and boiled onions are minced (ground) together, then mixed with breadcrumbs or cold boiled potatoes, seasoned with sage, mixed herbs and pepper, all beaten together and then wrapped in small pieces of caul to form a ball. They are baked in the oven, and usually served cold.

== Production ==
The dish gained popularity during the rationing in World War II, but declined over the following decades. The "nose-to-tail eating" trend has resulted in greater demand for faggots in the 21st century; British supermarket chain Waitrose once again sold beef faggots from 2014. In 2018, it was estimated that "tens of millions" of faggots were eaten every year.

== Double meaning ==
The use of the word "faggot" has caused misunderstanding due to its meaning as a pejorative term for a homosexual man. In 2004, a radio commercial for the UK supermarket chain Somerfield, in which a man rejects his wife's suggested dinner saying "I've got nothing against faggots, I just don't fancy them" was found to have been innuendo which breached the Advertising and Sponsorship Code and was banned by the industry regulator Ofcom.

Additionally, the term caused multiple instances of the Scunthorpe problem, where profanity filters erroneously blocked the term regardless of its use in context. In November 2013, it was reported that British Facebook users had been blocked temporarily for using the word, in its culinary sense, on the website. Facebook said that the word had been misinterpreted. In September 2019, a Google Ads advertisement for a British cafe was removed for featuring the term.

== See also ==
- Faggot (unit)
- 9K111 Fagot
- Frikadelle
- Rissole – European fried dish
- Scrapple – American pork offal mush
