= Rumaki =

US hors d'oeuvre in Tiki culture

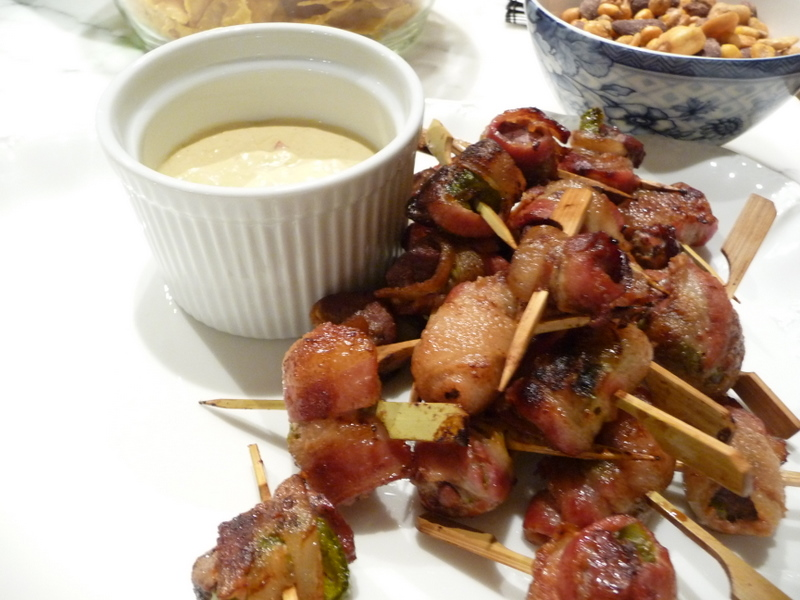
- Duck rumaki
- Course: Hors d'oeuvre
- Created by: Unknown
- Main ingredients: Water chestnuts, liver (duck or chicken), bacon, soy sauce, ginger, or brown sugar

Rumaki or rumake is an hors d'oeuvre of Tiki culture origin. It was popularly served at Trader Vic's and other Polynesian restaurants in the 1950s and 1960s.

== Preparation ==
Rumaki's ingredients and method of preparation vary, but usually it consists of water chestnuts and pieces of chicken liver wrapped in bacon and marinated in soy sauce and either ginger or brown sugar, then fried or baked.

== Etymology ==
One of the earliest references to rumaki is on the 1941 menu of the Don the Beachcomber restaurant (Palm Springs).

The name, like the dish, was probably invented at Don the Beachcomber. Its etymological origin is unknown. However, it could be short for Japanese harumaki, 'spring roll'.

== See also ==
- Crab Rangoon
