= Liver as food =

Liver meat used as food

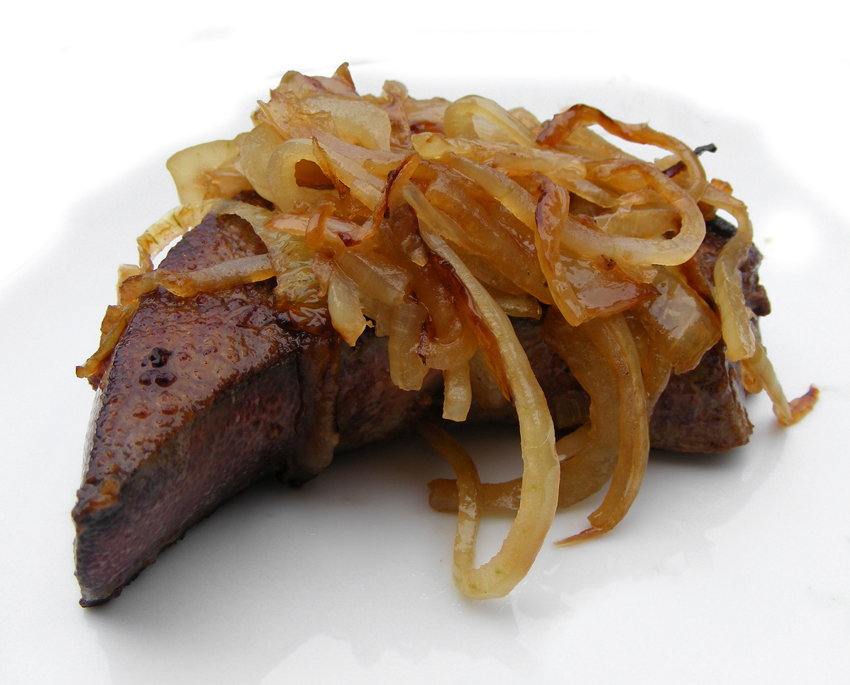
Slice of pig's liver and onions

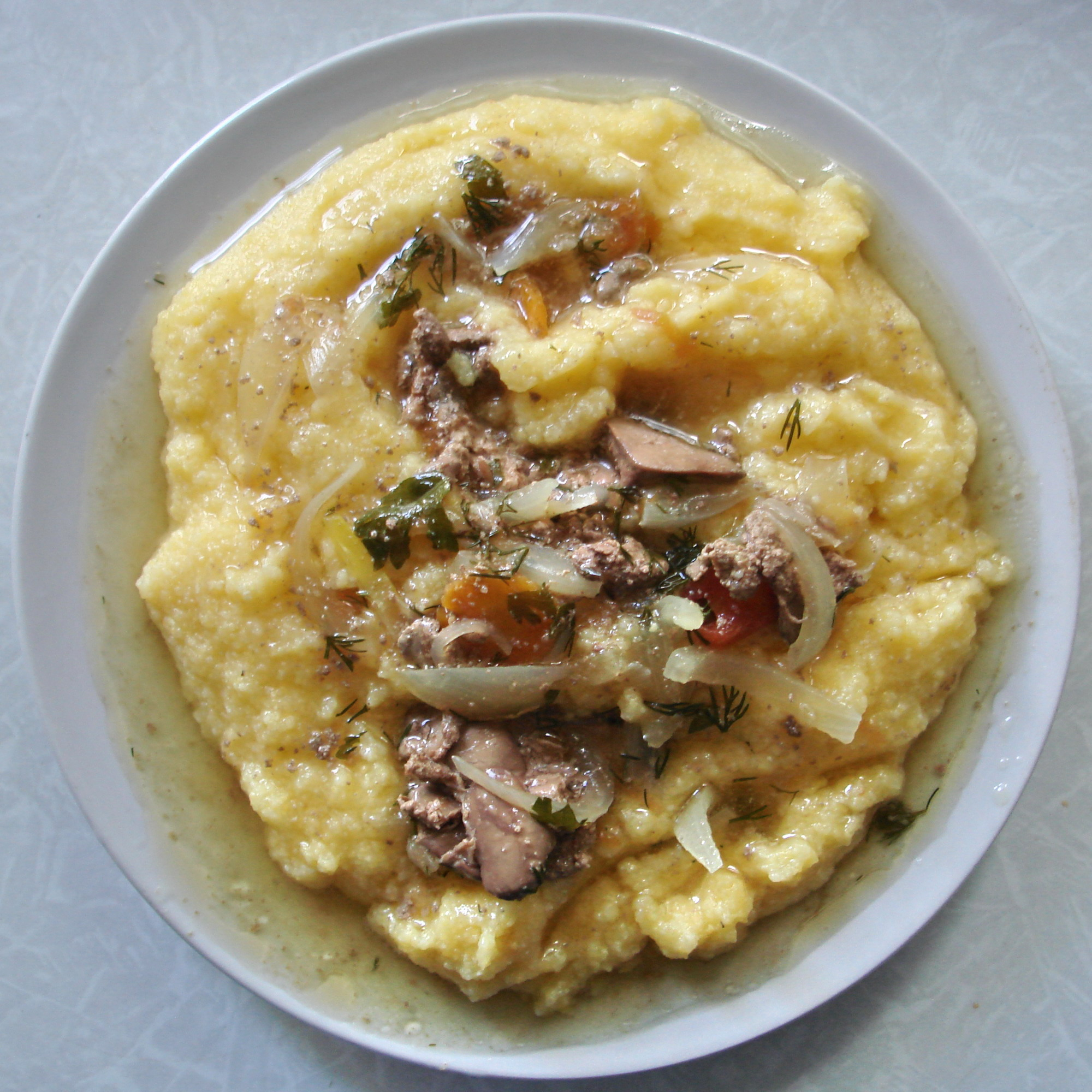
Mămăligă (cornmeal mush) with chicken liver, cuisine of Moldova

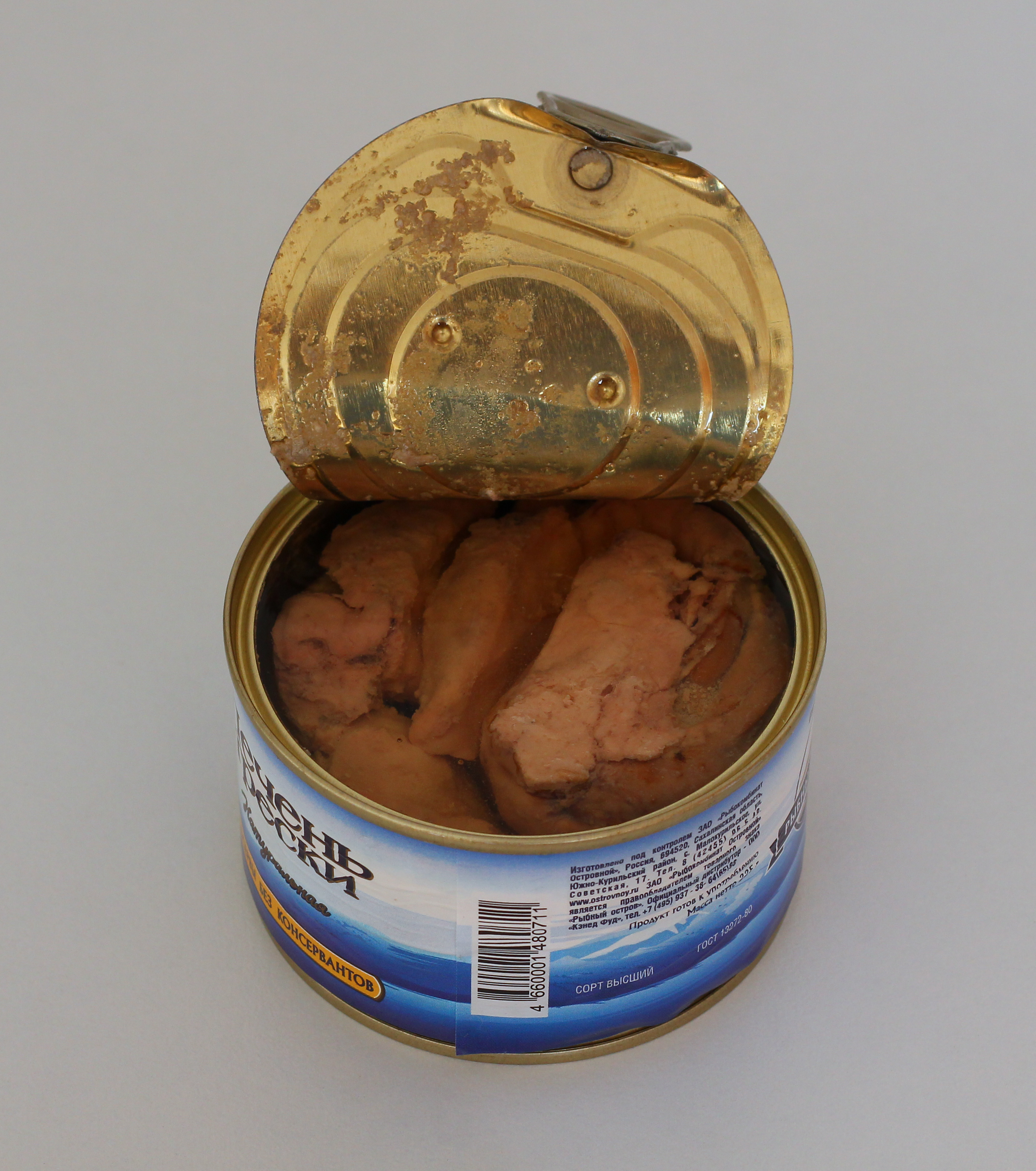
Canned cod liver (see also: cod liver oil)

The liver of mammals, fowl, and fish is commonly eaten as food by humans (see offal). Pork, lamb, veal, beef, chicken, goose, and cod livers are widely available from butchers and supermarkets while stingray and burbot livers are common in some European countries.

== Nutrition ==
liver, pork, raw
Nutritional value per 100 g (3.5 oz)
- Energy: 561 kJ (134 kcal)
- Carbohydrates: 2.5 g
- Fat: 3.7 g
- Protein: 21 g
Vitamins and minerals
Vitamins	Quantity %DV^{†}
Vitamin A equiv.	722% 6500 μg
Riboflavin (B2)	231% 3 mg
Niacin (B3)	94% 15 mg
Pantothenic acid (B5)	134% 6.7 mg
Vitamin B6	41% 0.7 mg
Folate (B9)	53% 212 μg
Vitamin B12	1083% 26 μg
Vitamin C	26% 23 mg
Minerals	Quantity %DV^{†}
Iron	128% 23 mg
Sodium	4% 87 mg
- This nutritional data is from 1992 and refers to raw pork liver only. Liver nutrients vary among species.
- ^{†}Percentages estimated using US recommendations for adults.

Animal livers are rich in iron, copper, B vitamins and preformed vitamin A. Daily consumption of liver can be harmful; for instance, vitamin A toxicity has been proven to cause medical issues to babies born of pregnant mothers who consumed too much vitamin A. For the same reason, consuming the livers of some species like polar bears, dogs, or moose is unsafe. A single slice (68 g) of beef liver exceeds the tolerable upper intake level of vitamin A (6410 μg preformed vs. UL for preformed = 3000 μg). 100 g cod liver contains 5000 μg of vitamin A and 100 μg of vitamin D. Liver contains large amounts of vitamin B_{12}, and this was one of the factors that led to the discovery of the vitamin.

== Etymology ==
From Middle English liver, from Old English lifer, from Proto-Germanic *librō, from Proto-Indo-European *leyp- "to smear, smudge, stick", from Proto-Indo-European *ley- "to be slimy, be sticky, glide". Cognate with Saterland Frisian Lieuwer "liver", West Frisian lever "liver", Dutch lever "liver", German Leber "liver", Danish, Norwegian and Swedish language lever "liver" the last three from Old Norse lifr "liver".

In the Romance languages, the anatomical word for "liver" (French foie, Italian fegato, Spanish hígado, etc.) derives not from the Latin anatomical term, jecur, but from the culinary term ficatum, literally "stuffed with figs", referring to the livers of geese that had been fattened on figs (foie gras).

== Preparation ==
Liver can be baked, boiled, broiled, fried, stir-fried, or eaten raw (asbeh nayeh or sawda naye in Lebanese cuisine, liver sashimi). In many preparations, pieces of liver are combined with pieces of meat or kidneys, like in the various forms of Middle Eastern mixed grill . Spreads or pâtés made from liver have various names, including liver pâté, pâté de foie gras, chopped liver, liverwurst, liver spread, and Braunschweiger. Other liver sausages include mazzafegato or salsiccia matta. A traditional South African delicacy, namely skilpadjies, is made of minced lamb's liver wrapped in netvet (caul fat), and grilled over an open fire.

In the United Kingdom and countries influenced by British culture, calf's liver and bacon and liver and onions are traditional stew-like meals, the ingredients being sautéed or fried, with the juices forming a rich gravy.

== Fish liver ==
Some fish livers are valued as food, especially the stingray liver. It is used to prepare delicacies, such as poached skate liver on toast in England, as well as the beignets de foie de raie and foie de raie en croute in French cuisine. Cod liver (usually tinned in its oil and served seasoned) is a popular spread for bread or toast in several European countries. In Russia, it is served with potatoes. Cod liver oil is commonly used as a dietary supplement. Liver of burbot is eaten in Finland: it is common for fish vendors and supermarket fish aisles to sell these fish with liver and roe sacks still attached. These parts are often eaten boiled or added to burbot soup. Burbot and its liver are a traditional winter food.

== Poisoning ==
The livers of polar bears, walruses, bearded seals, and huskies can contain very high levels of preformed vitamin A, and their consumption has led to vitamin A poisoning (hypervitaminosis A) according to several anecdotal reports. It has been estimated that consumption of 500 grams of polar bear liver would result in a toxic dose for a human. Russian sailor Alexander Konrad, who accompanied explorer Valerian Albanov in a tragic ordeal over the Arctic ice in 1912, wrote about the awful effects of consuming polar bear liver. Also, in 1913, Antarctic explorers on the Far Eastern Party Douglas Mawson and Xavier Mertz were believed to have been poisoned, the latter fatally, from eating husky liver, though this claim has been contested since 2005.

Mercury content in some species can also be an issue. In 2012, the Government of Nunavut, Canada warned pregnant women to lower their intake of ringed seal liver due to elevated levels of organomercury.

The neurotoxin in the liver of the pufferfish (which is consumed in Japanese cuisine as fugu, tightly regulated by Japanese law) contains the highest concentration of the tetrodotoxin, which characterizes the species. Consequently, the liver has been illegal to serve since 1984.

== Traditions ==
Pig liver is a traditional food of immigrant Okinawans in Hawaii. It used to be eaten on New Year's Eve.

In Pakistan and North India, the liver is eaten traditionally as the first meat of the sacrificial animal during Eid al-Adha. Kaleji masala or kaleji salan is popular throughout the festival.

== See also ==
- Offal
