= Meatball soup =

Type of soup made using meatballs

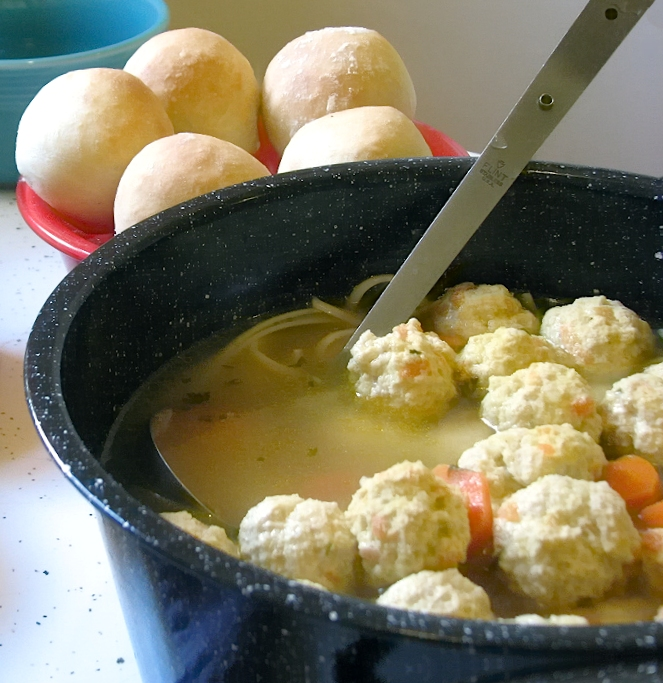
- German traditional Wedding Soup with meatballs
- Type: Sour soup
- Main ingredients: Meatballs, Ground meat, rice, spices
- Variations: Ciorbă de perişoare, Sulu köfte, albondigas

Meatball soup is a soup made using meatballs, simmered with various other ingredients. Meatball soup typically consists of broth with whole or cut meatballs. Common additions are vegetables, pasta (e.g., noodles, although almost any form can be used), dumplings, or grains such as rice and barley. Various types of meat are used, such as beef, lamb, pork and poultry.

== Varieties ==
- Bakso
- Ciorbă de perișoare
- Italian wedding soup
- Sulu köfte
- Sopa de albóndigas
- Supa topcheta
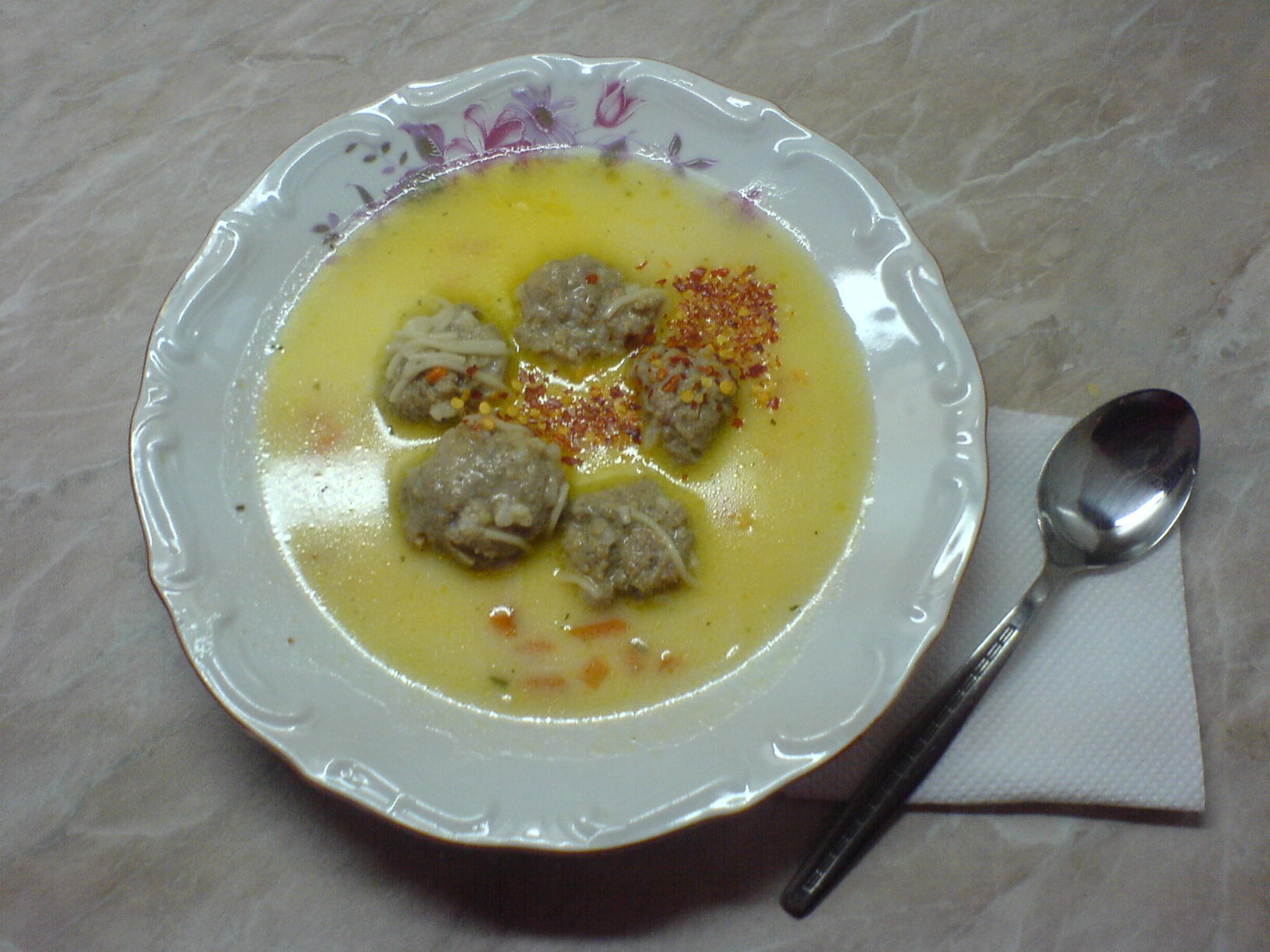
Bulgarian meatball soup

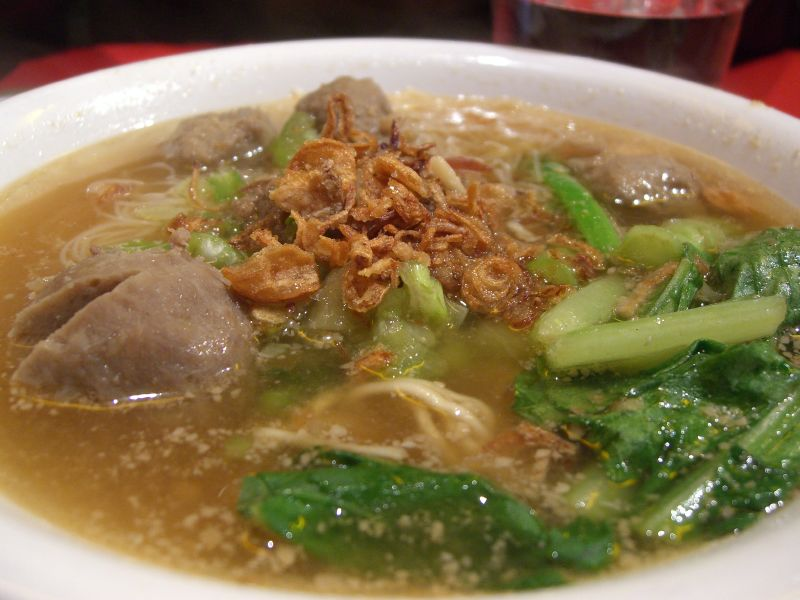
Indonesian bakso noodle soup

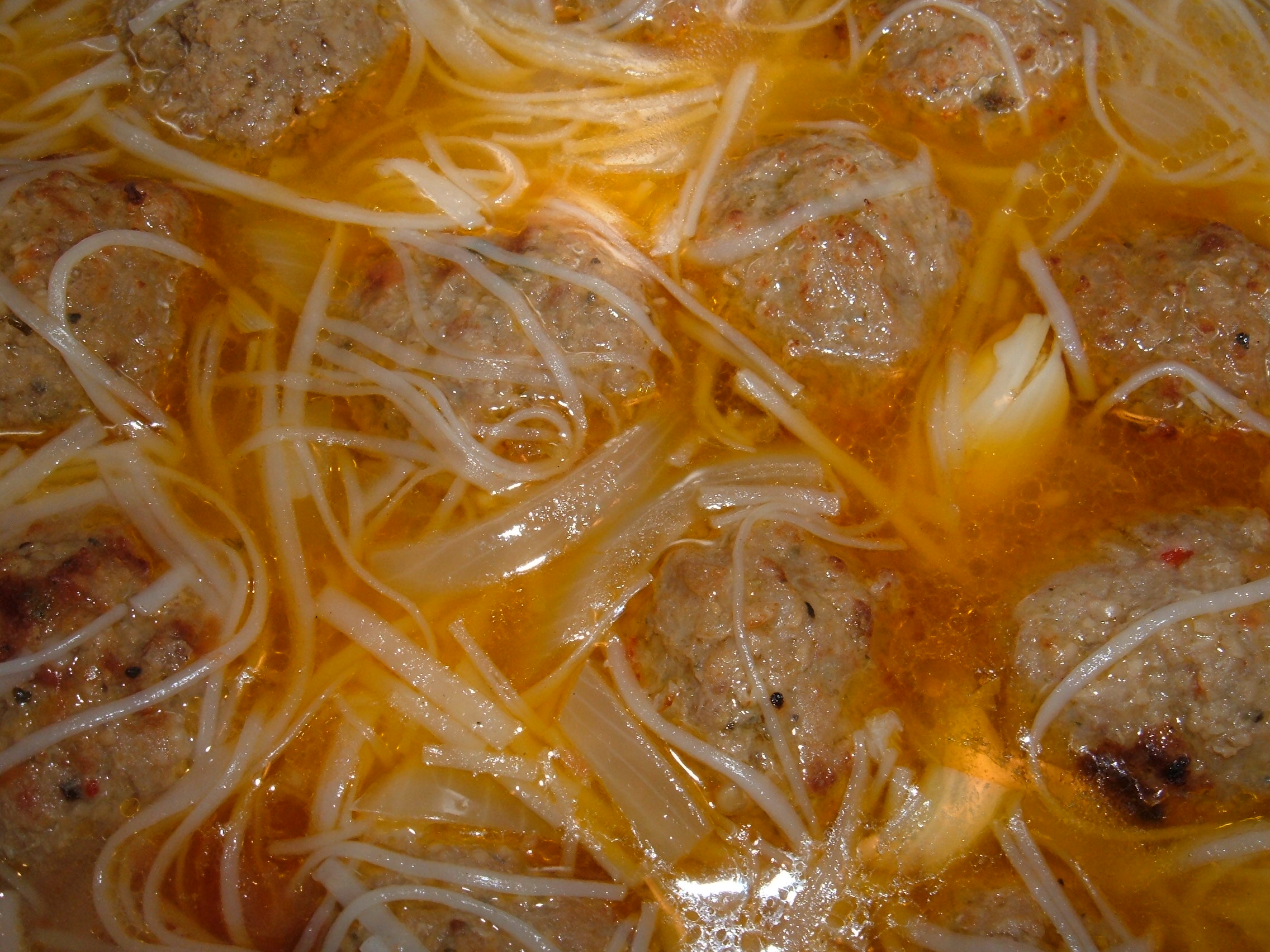
Filipino almondigas

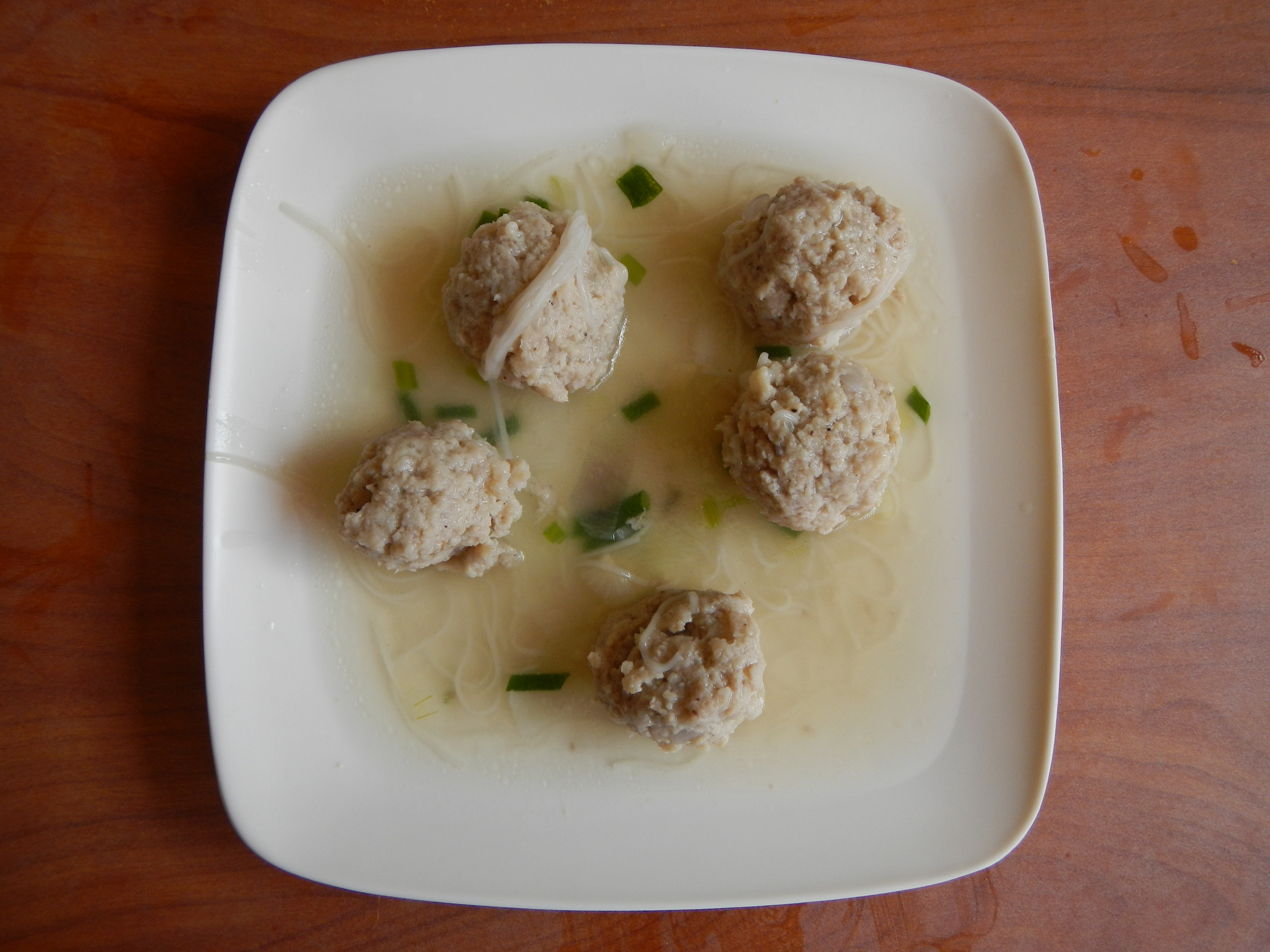
Bola bola with misua (Philippines)

== See also ==
- Analı kızlı soup
- Bakso
- Ciorbă de perişoare
- Harput meatballs
- Hochzeitssuppe
- List of meatball dishes
- List of soups
- Smyrna meatballs
- Tabriz meatballs
- Yuvarlak
