= Ciorbă de perișoare =

Romanian soup

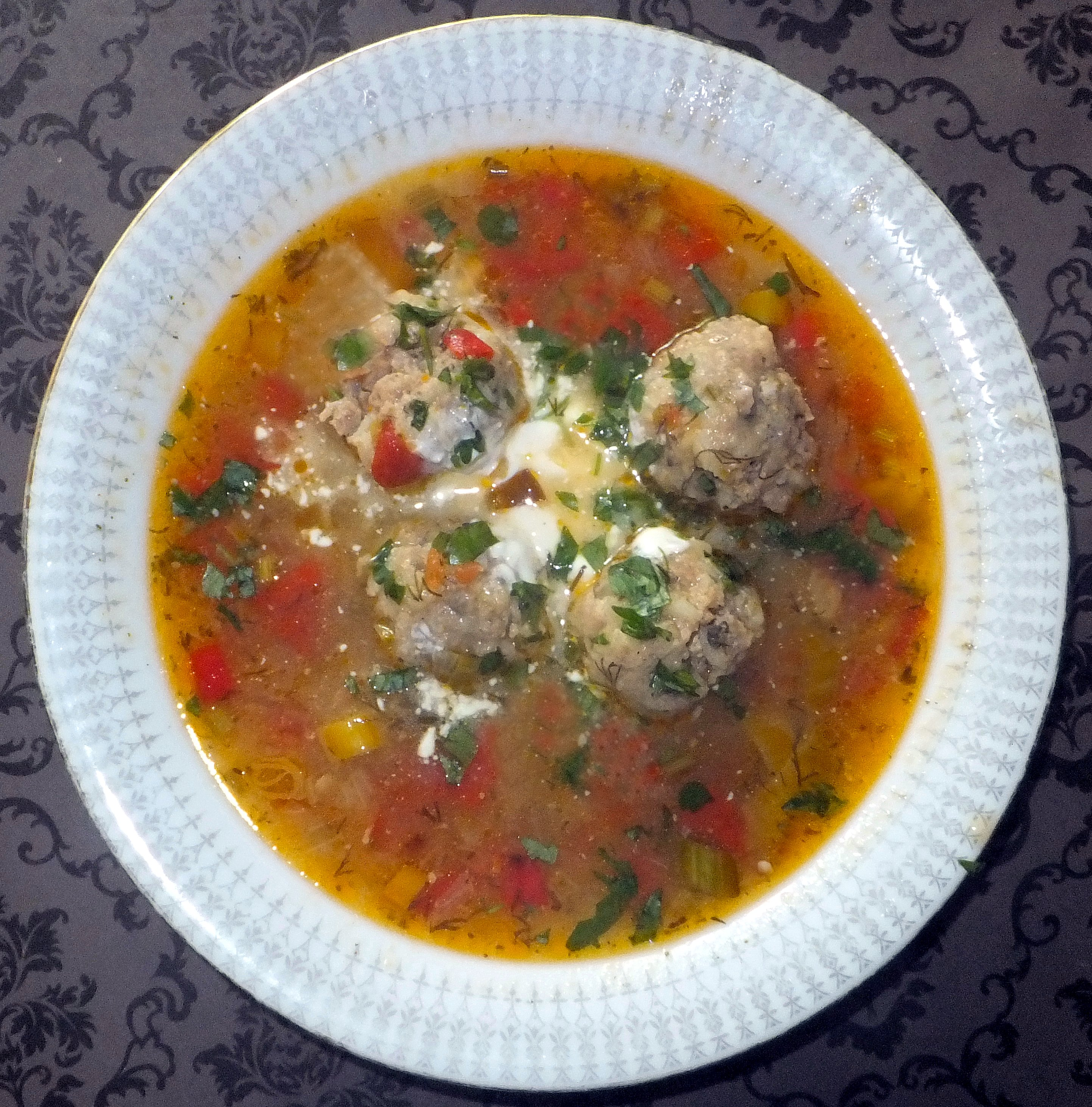
- Type: Sour soup
- Place of origin: Romania
- Main ingredients: Meatballs (minced pork), rice, spices, ciorbă

Ciorbă de perișoare is a traditional Romanian sour soup made with meatballs. Perișoare are meatballs usually made with minced pork meat, mixed with rice and spices and boiled in a ciorbă—a soup made with assorted vegetables such as onions, parsnips, celery, and a sour liquid or powder (bran), typically garnished with parsley, dill, and lovage. It is typically served with sour cream and hot peppers.

== See also ==
- Chiftele
- List of soups
- Pârjoale
- Hochzeitssuppe
- Sulu köfte
- Smyrna meatballs
- Yuvarlak
- Tabriz meatballs
- Harput meatballs
