= Harput meatballs =

Turkish meatball dish

- Alternative names: Harput kofta
- Type: Sour soup
- Place of origin: Turkey
- Main ingredients: Ground beef, fine bulgur, cracked wheat, egg, tomato paste, salt, spices, parsley and basil.
- Variations: Ciorbă de perişoare, Sulu köfte, Yuvarlak, Smyrna meatballs

Harput meatballs (Turkish: Harput köftesi) originated in the Eastern Anatolian city of Harput (today Elazığ, in Turkey). It is made by adding lean ground beef, fine bulgur, cracked wheat, egg, tomato paste, salt, spices, parsley and basil. They are known also as large meatballs.

== See also ==
- Tabriz meatballs
- Sulu köfte
- Ciorbă de perişoare
- Smyrna meatballs
- Yuvarlak
- List of meatball dishes
