= Tabriz meatballs =

Iranian meatball

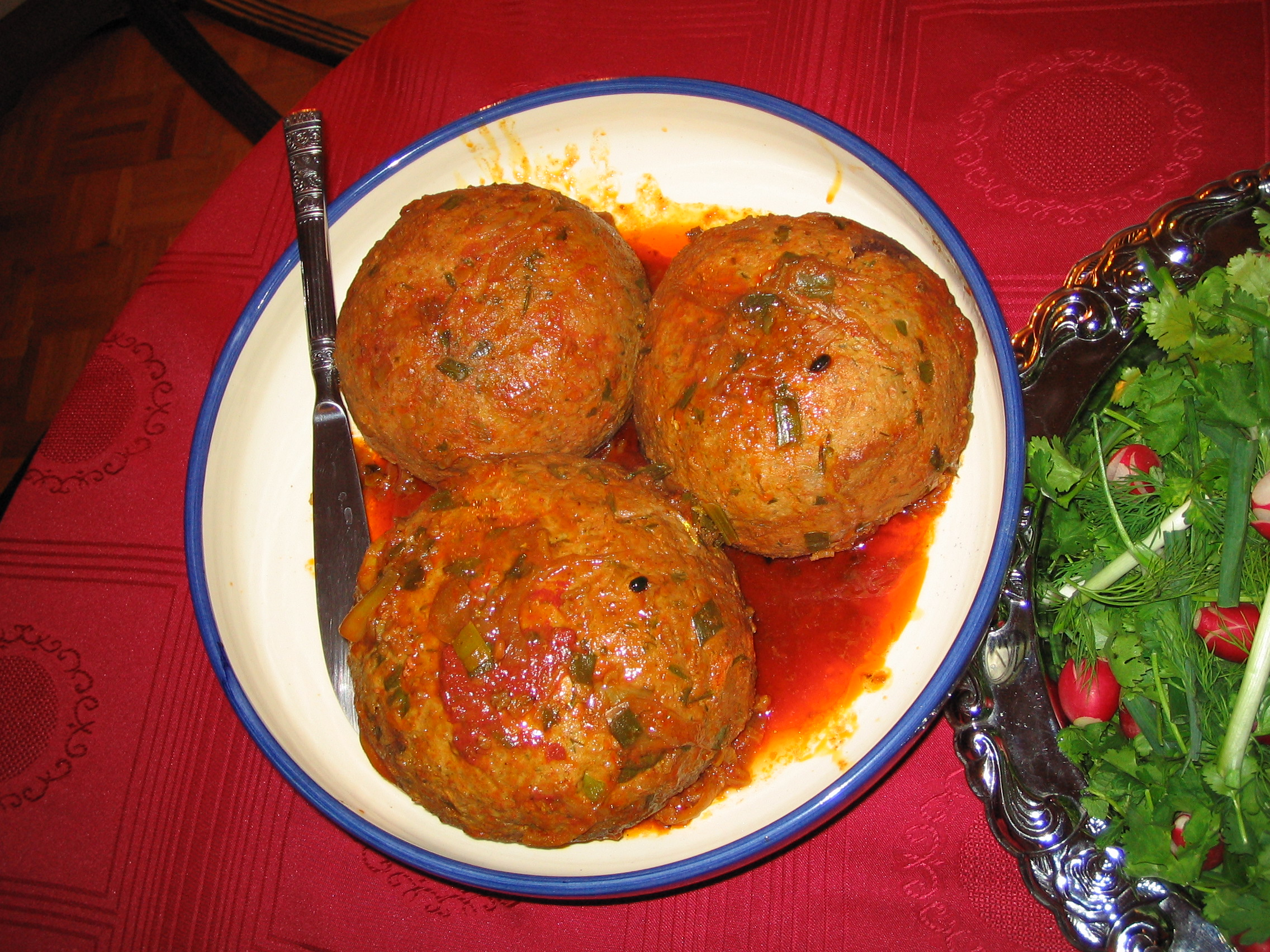
- Alternative names: Kufteh Tabrizi, koofteh Tabrizi
- Type: Meatballs
- Place of origin: Iran
- Associated cuisine: Iranian, Azerbaijani
- Main ingredients: Ground meat, rice, leeks, split peas, and other ingredients
- Variations: Ciorbă de perişoare, sulu köfte, yuvarlak, Smyrna meatballs

Tabriz meatballs (Azerbaijani: تبریز کوفته‌سی, romanized: Təbriz küftəsi; Persian: کوفته تبریزی, romanized: kufteh Tabrizi), also known as Koofteh Tabrizi, are a variety of meatballs from the city of Tabriz traditional to Iranian and Azerbaijani cuisines. The dish normally consists of a large meatball including rice, yellow split peas, herbs and other ingredients, and its juice which is served in a separate dish with shredded sangak or lavash bread before the main course.

== Preparation ==
The ingredients are ground beef, rice, yellow split peas, leeks, mint, parsley, onion and spices, wrapped around a core of boiled egg, walnut, fried onion and dried apricot. The kufteh are braised along with fried onions, tomato paste and barberries.

Some versions are wrapped around a small stuffed bird before stewing.

== Etymology ==
Kufteh Tabrizi means 'meatball of Tabriz'. The word is derived from kūfteh: in Persian, kuftan (کوفتن) means 'to beat' or 'to grind'.

== See also ==
- Iranian cuisine
- Azerbaijani cuisine
- Sulu köfte
- Ciorbă de perişoare
- Smyrna meatballs
- Nargesi kofta
- Yuvarlak
- Harput meatballs
- List of soups
- List of meatball dishes
