= Sulu köfte =

Turkish stew with meatballs

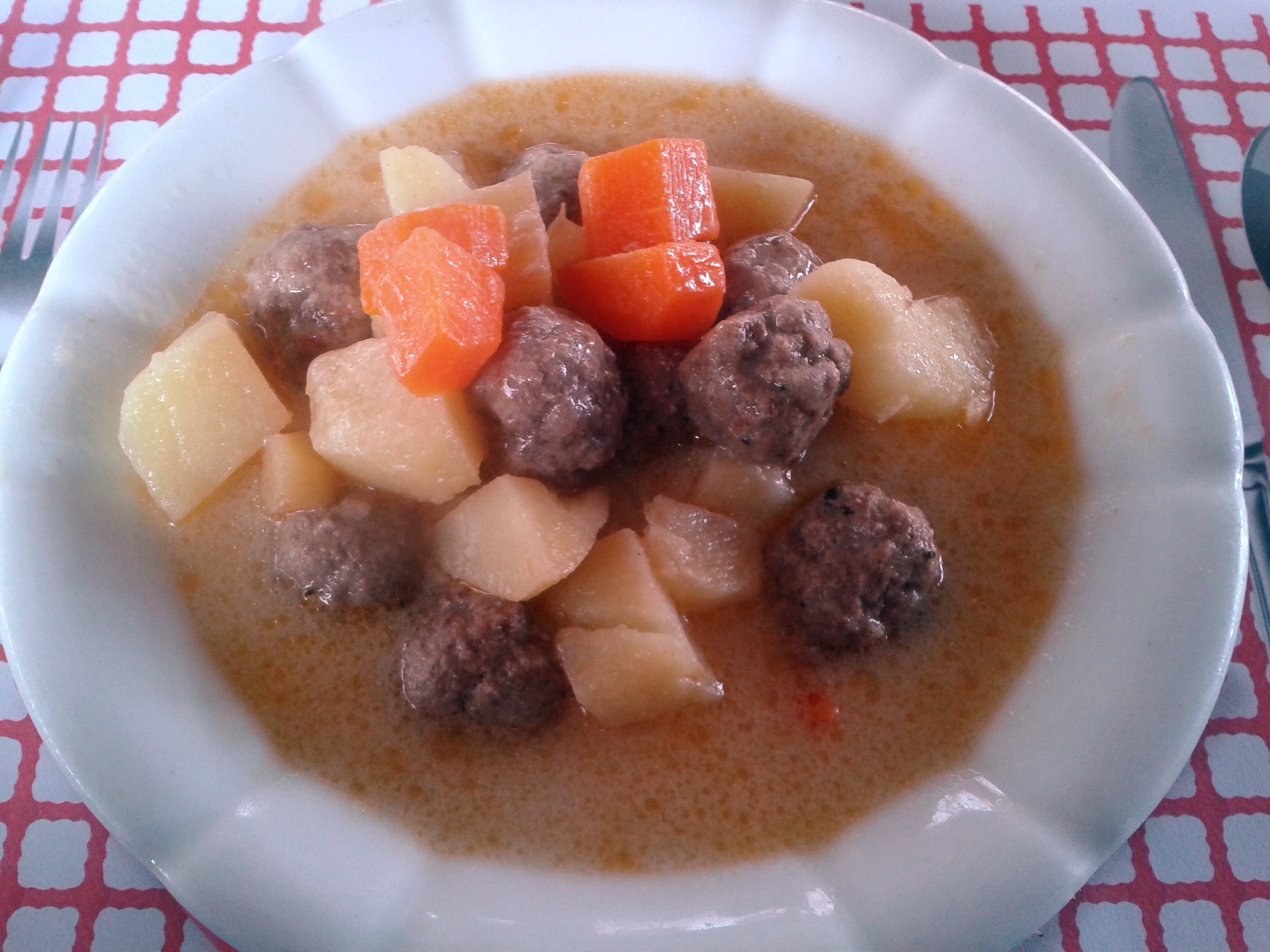
- A plate of sulu köfte
- Type: Soup or stew
- Place of origin: Turkey
- Region or state: Balkans, South Caucasus, Eastern Mediterranean
- Serving temperature: Hot
- Main ingredients: Ground meat, rice, spices, broth
- Variations: Ekşili köfte

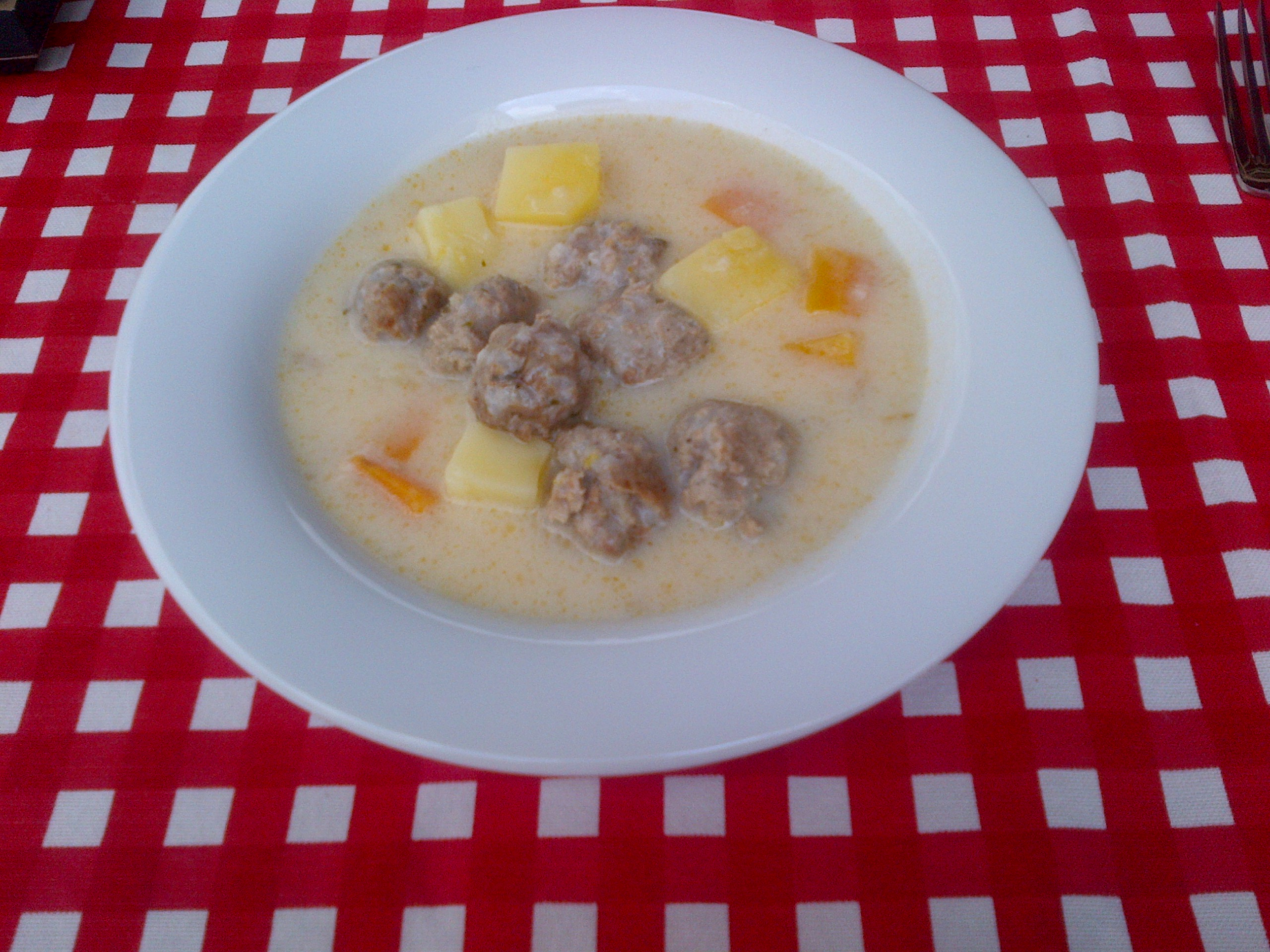
Eksili Kofte with "terbiye"

Sulu köfte is a Turkish stew or thick soup (çorba) with köfte. It consists of meatballs usually made with minced beef, mixed with rice or bulgur, onion and spices and boiled in their own gravy, with tomato sauce, olive oil and Turkish red pepper paste.

A similar dish is called ekşili köfte or terbiyeli köfte, when made with egg-lemon (terbiye) sauce.

== See also ==
- Analı kızlı soup
- Harput meatballs
- Hochzeitssuppe
- Smyrna meatballs
- Yuvarlak
- Tabriz meatballs
- List of meatball dishes
- List of soups
- List of stews
