= Smyrna meatballs =

Greek and Turkish dish of sauced meatballs

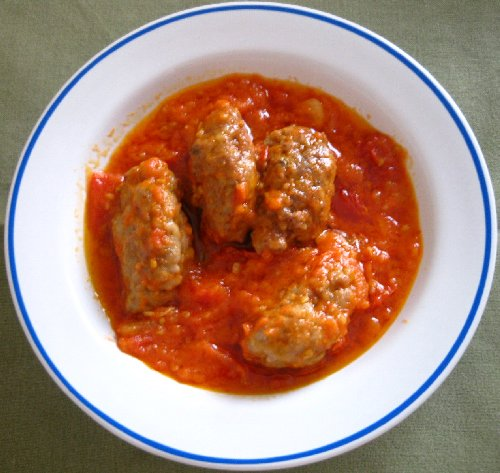
- Alternative names: İzmir köfte
- Type: Stew
- Region or state: İzmir
- Main ingredients: Minced meat (usually beef), bread crumbs, egg, garlic, and parsley, and generously spiced with cumin, cinnamon, salt, and pepper.
- Variations: Ciorbă de perişoare, Sulu köfte, Yuvarlak, Tabriz meatballs

Smyrna meatballs, known as soutzoukakia Smyrneika (Greek: σουτζουκάκια σμυρναίικα) or İzmir köfte (Turkish), is a Greek and Turkish dish of spicy oblong meatballs with cumin and garlic served in tomato sauce. This dish was brought to Greece by Greek refugees from Asia Minor.

The Greek version is typically made with minced meat (usually beef, also mixed with lamb or pork), bread crumbs, egg, garlic, and parsley, and generously spiced with cumin, cinnamon, salt, and pepper. They are floured before being fried in olive oil. The tomato sauce has tomato, wine, onion, garlic, a bayleaf, salt and pepper, and olive oil. Soutzoukakia are generally served with pilaf or mashed potatoes.

Turkish recipes for İzmir köfte are very similar, though without pork and wine, and often also include sliced potatoes, diced tomatoes, hot pepper flakes, or other variations.

== Name ==
The Turkish name İzmir köfte means köfte (meatballs) from İzmir, formerly Smyrna.

The Greek name σουτζουκάκια σμυρνέικα means spicy little sausages (Turkish sucuk + Greek diminutive -άκι) from Smyrna. Soutzoukakia can sometimes refer to the same cylindrical meatballs when grilled (like köfte kebab) rather than served in sauce. Another variation of the dish is soutzoukakia politika (Greek: σουτζουκάκια πολίτικα), meatballs from Constantinople.

== See also ==
- Ciorbă de perişoare
- Harput meatballs
- List of meatball dishes
- Sulu köfte
- Tabriz meatballs
- Yuvarlak
