= Analı kızlı soup =

Type of Turkish soup

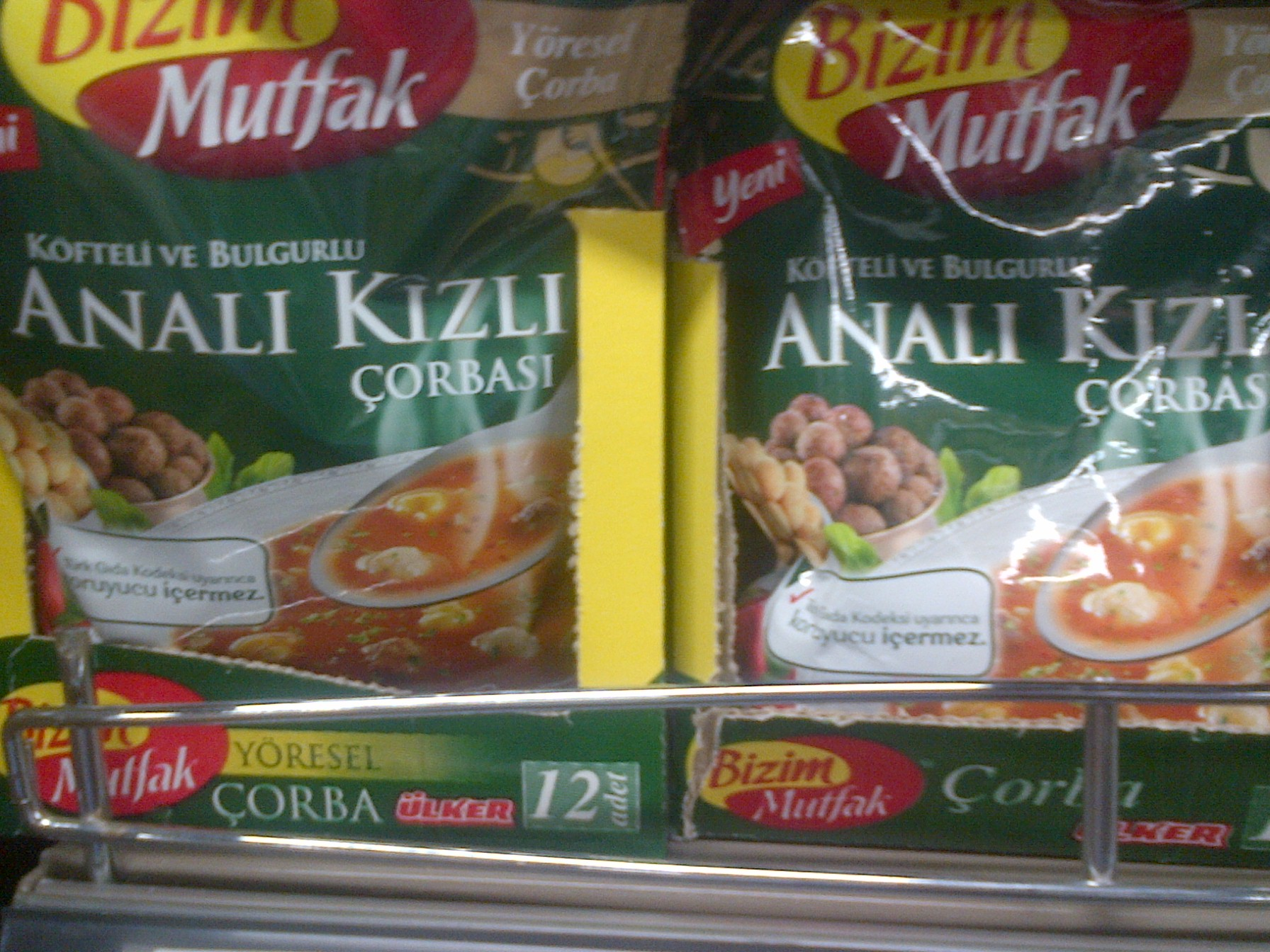
- Dehydrated analı kızlı soup
- Type: Soup
- Place of origin: Turkey
- Region or state: Malatya, Kahramanmaraş, Diyarbakır, Gaziantep, Tarsus, Adana

Analı kızlı soup is a soup from Turkey (Adana, Tarsus, Gaziantep, Kahramanmaraş, Malatya) which includes meatballs, tomato, bulgur, and chickpeas. 'Analı kızlı' means, literally, 'with daughters and mothers', daughters being the chickpeas, and mothers the bulgur balls (i.e., meatballs covered with a thin layer of bulgur), all in a soup like a yogurt sauce. It is a part of traditional Turkish cuisine.

== See also ==
- List of soups
- Sulu köfte
