= Avgolemono =

Egg-lemon sauce or soup

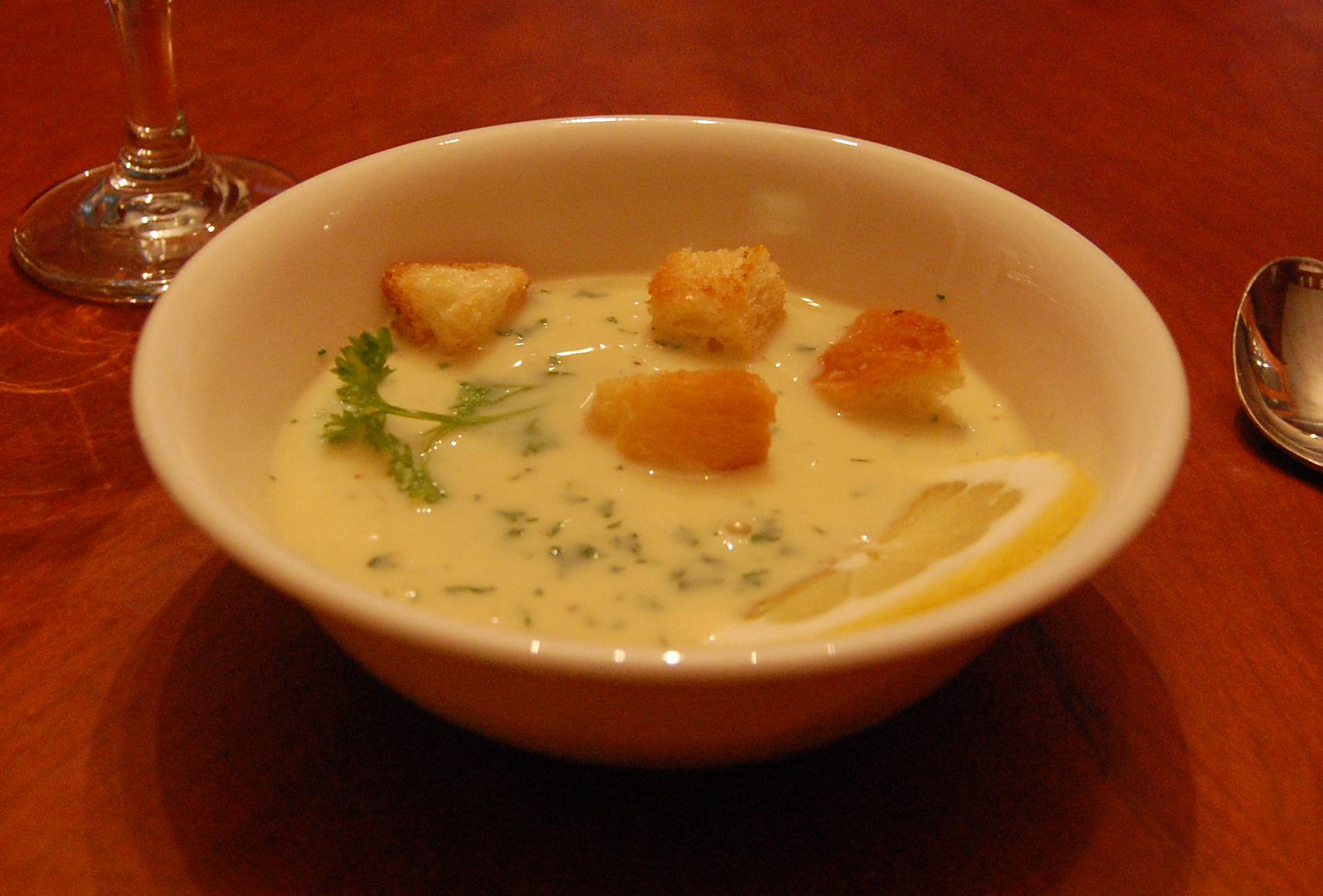
- Type: Sauce and soup
- Main ingredients: Eggs, lemon juice, broth

Avgolemono (Greek: αυγολέμονο or αβγολέμονο literally egg-lemon) is a family of sauces and soups made with egg yolk and lemon juice mixed with broth, then reduced.

Avgolemono can be used to thicken soups and stews. For instance, the traditionally Greek meatball soup Yuvarlakia, made with rice and meatballs that are cooked in liquid, has avgolemono added to the soup to thicken it. Magiritsa is a Greek avgolemono soup of lamb offal served to break the fast of Great Lent.

As a soup, avgolemono usually starts with chicken broth, though meat (usually lamb), fish, or vegetable broths are also used. Typically, rice, orzo, pastina, or tapioca are cooked in the broth before the mixture of eggs and lemon is added. Its consistency varies from near-stew to near-broth. It is often served with pieces of meat and vegetables reserved from the broth.

The soup is usually made with whole eggs, but sometimes with just yolks. The egg whites may be beaten into an egg white foam separately before mixing with the yolks and lemon juice, or whole eggs may be beaten with the lemon juice.

The starch produced by cooking the pasta or rice contributes to stabilizing the emulsion.

== Similar foods ==
Similar foods are found in Greek, Cypriot, Arab, Sephardic Jewish, Turkish, Balkan and Jewish-Italian cuisine.

In Sephardic Jewish cuisine, it is called agristada (he:אגריסטדה) or salsa blanco, and in Jewish-Italian, bagna brusca, brodettato, or brodo brusco. In Arabic, it is called tarbiya or beida bi-lemoune 'egg with lemon'; and in Turkish terbiye. It is also widely used in Balkan cuisine.

Although often considered a Greek dish, avgolemono is originally Sephardic Jewish: agristada has been described by Claudia Roden as the "cornerstone of Sephardic cooking."

Agristada was made by Jews in Iberia before the expulsion from Spain with verjuice, pomegranate juice, or bitter orange juice, but not vinegar. In later periods, lemon became the standard acidic ingredient.

For some Sephardic Jews, this soup (also called sopa de huevo y limón) is a traditional way to break the Yom Kippur fast.

As a sauce, it is used for warm dolma, for vegetables like artichokes, and roast meats. According to Joyce Goldstein, the dish terbiyeli köfte is made by frying meatballs until they are cooked through, then preparing a pan sauce by deglazing the pan and using the cooking juices to temper the avgolemono, which is served over the meatballs.

In some Middle Eastern cuisines, it is used as a sauce for chicken or fish. Among Italian Jews, it is served as a sauce for pasta or meat.

== See also ==
- List of egg dishes
- List of lemon dishes and beverages
- List of sauces
- List of soups

== Bibliography ==
- Alan Davidson, The Oxford Companion to Food, Oxford, 1999. ISBN 0-19-211579-0.
