= Meatball =

Dish of ground meat rolled into a ball

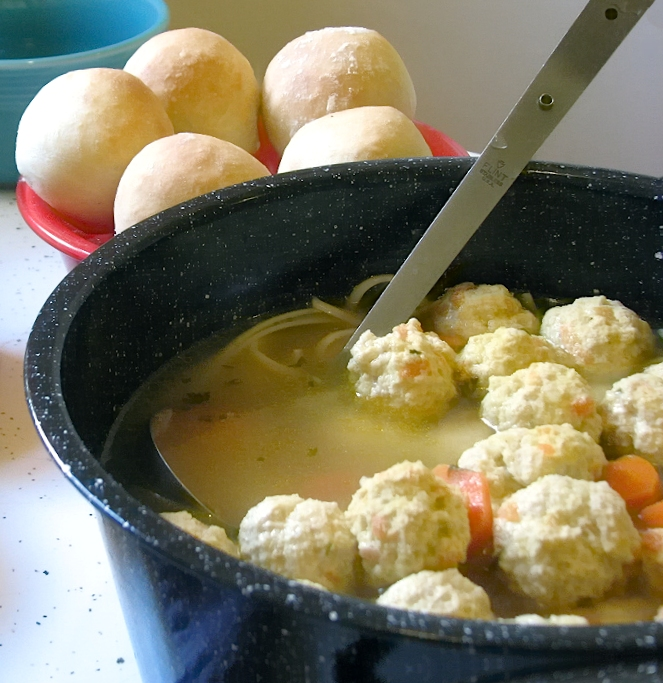
Hochzeitssuppe, a traditional German wedding soup with meatballs

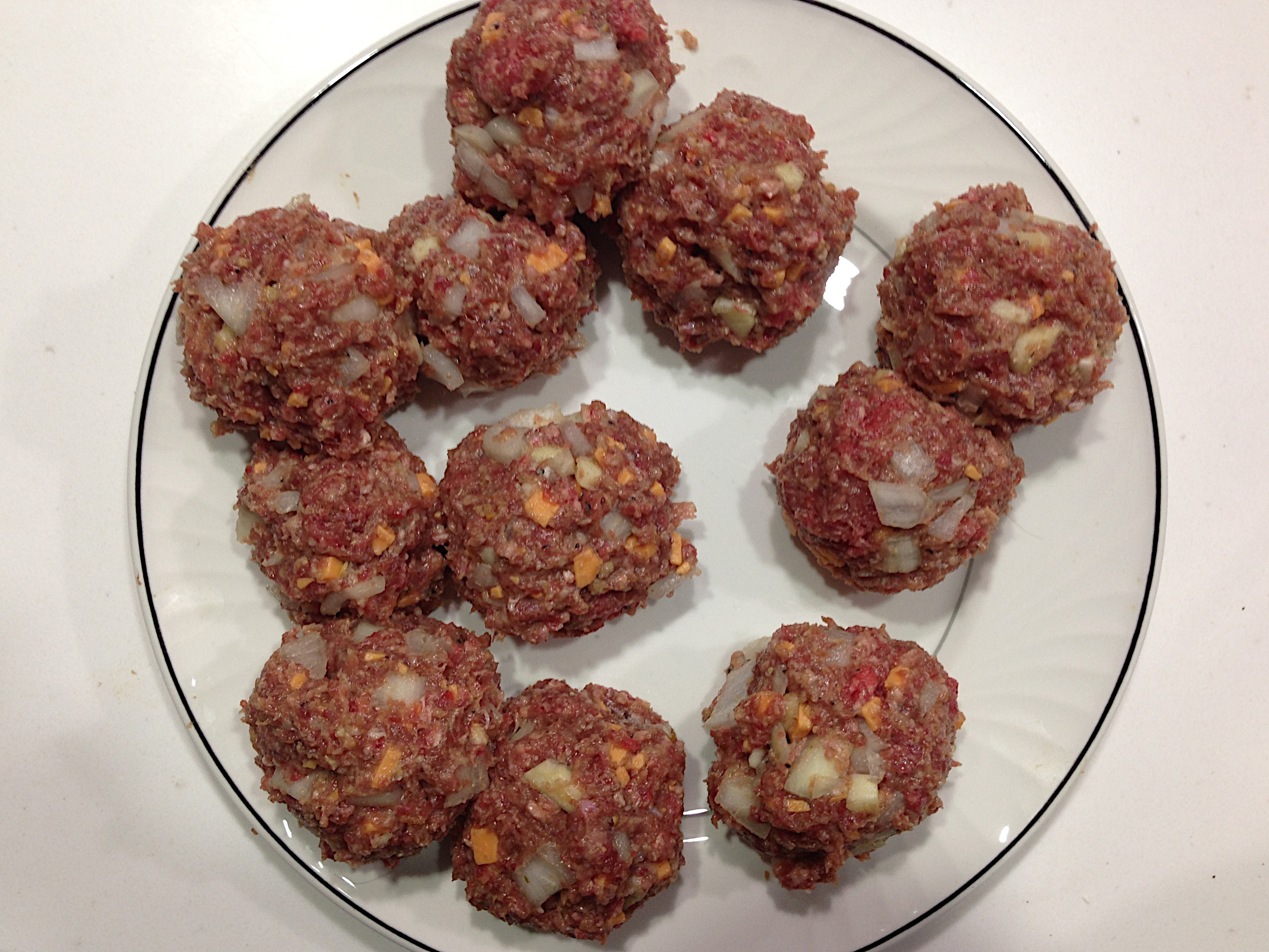
Raw meatballs

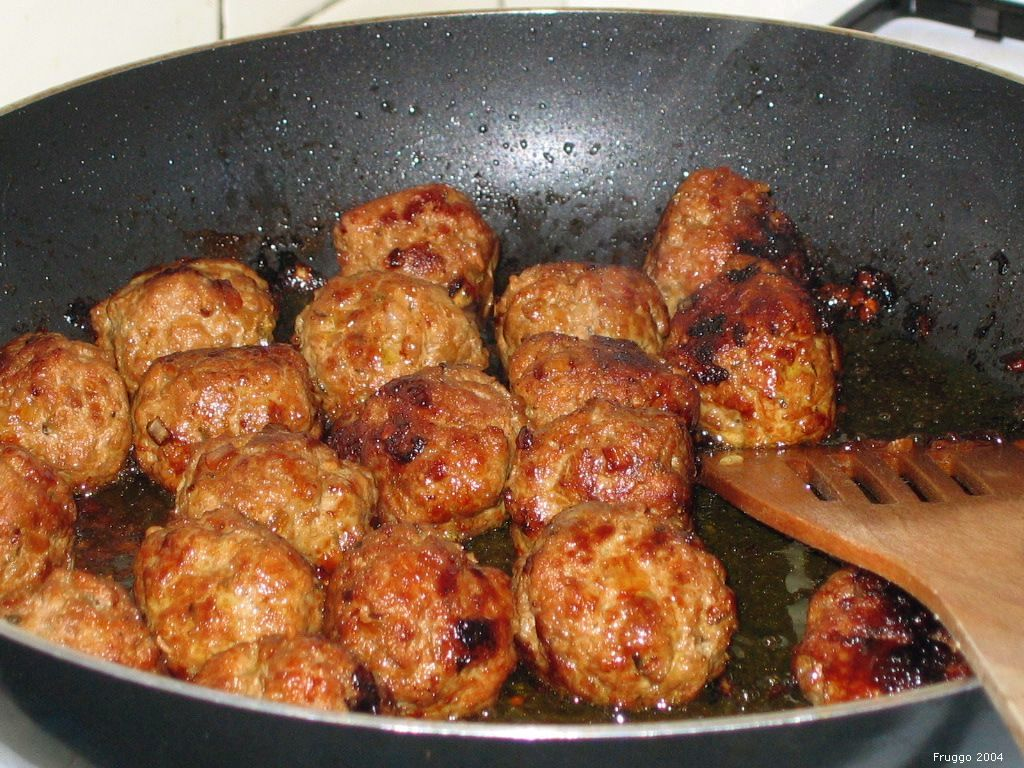
Meatballs being cooked

A meatball is ground meat (mince) rolled into a large somewhat spherical ball, sometimes along with other ingredients, such as bread crumbs, minced onion, eggs, butter, and seasoning. Meatballs are cooked by frying, baking, steaming, or braising in sauce. There are many types of meatballs made with different meats and spices. The term is sometimes extended to meatless versions based on legumes, vegetables, mushrooms, fish (also commonly known as fish balls) or other seafood.

== History ==
The ancient Roman cookbook Apicius included many meatball-type recipes.

Early recipes included in some of the earliest known Arabic cookbooks generally feature seasoned lamb rolled into orange-sized balls and glazed with egg yolk and sometimes saffron.

Poume d'oranges is a gilded meatball dish from the Middle Ages.

== By region ==
Various recipes of meatballs can be found across Europe and Asia. From Iberia and Sweden to the Indian subcontinent, there is a large variety of meatballs in the kofta family.

=== Europe ===
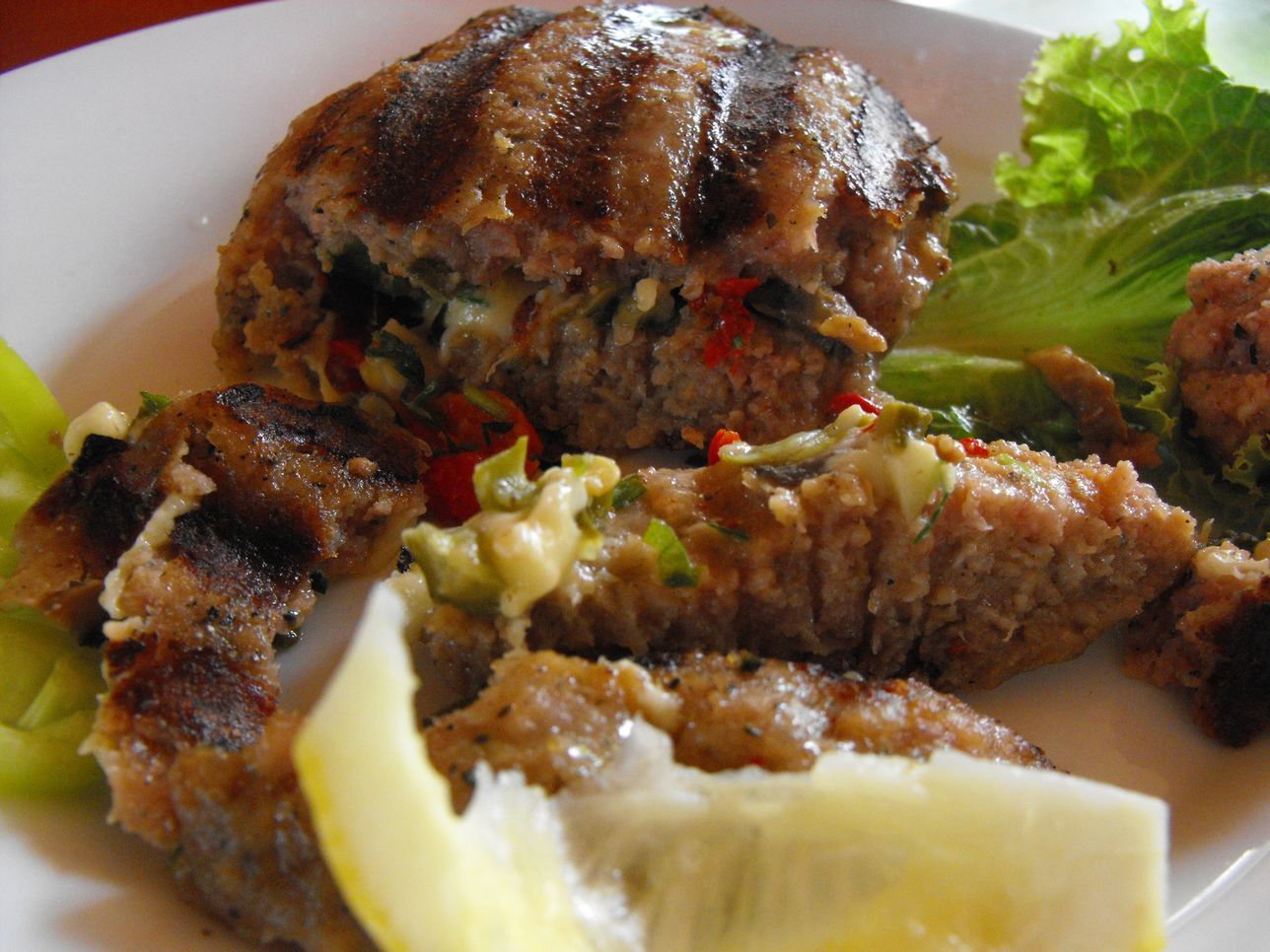
Bulgarian big meatball, tatarsko kufte

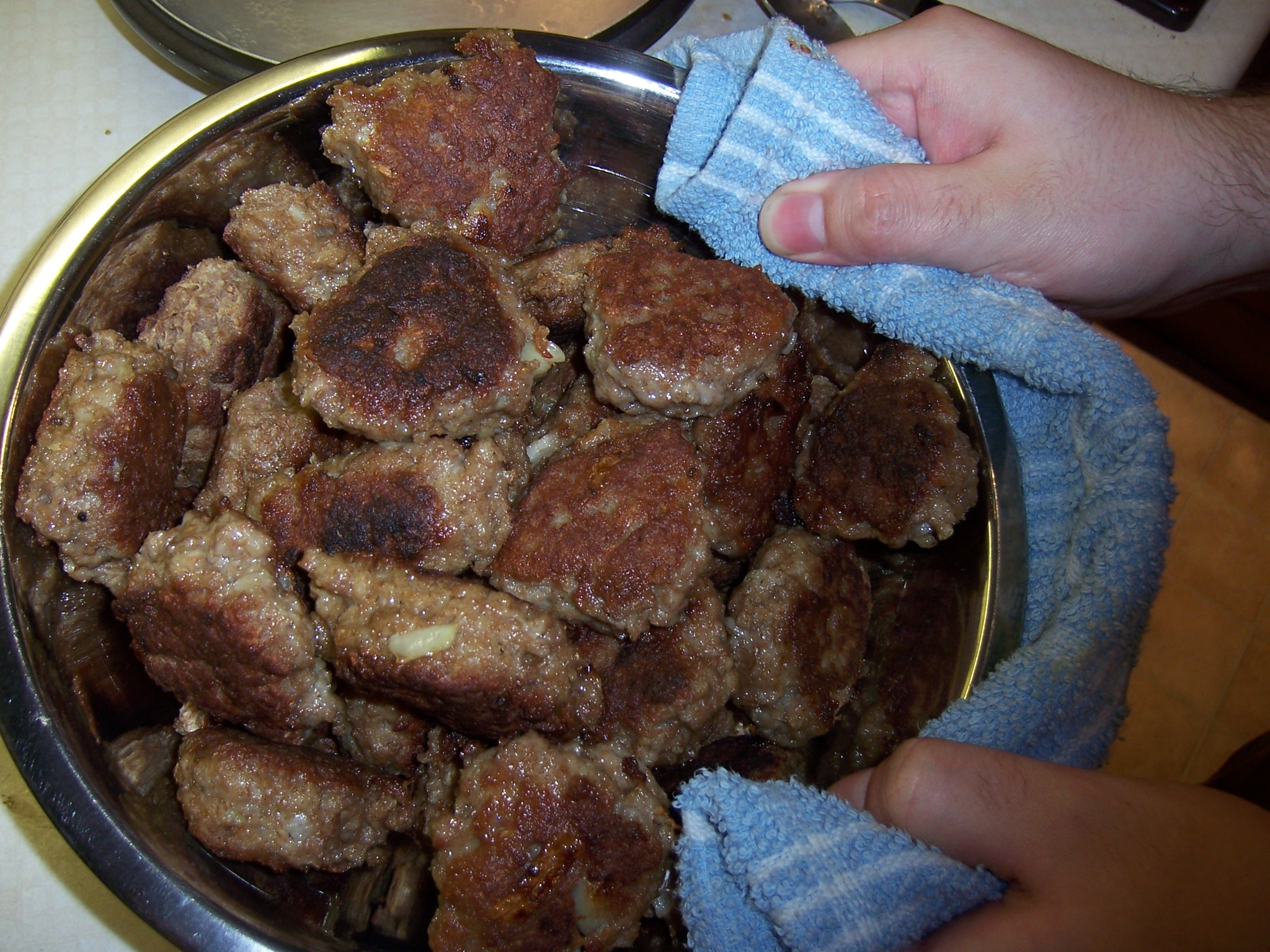
A freshly made batch of Danish meatballs (frikadeller)

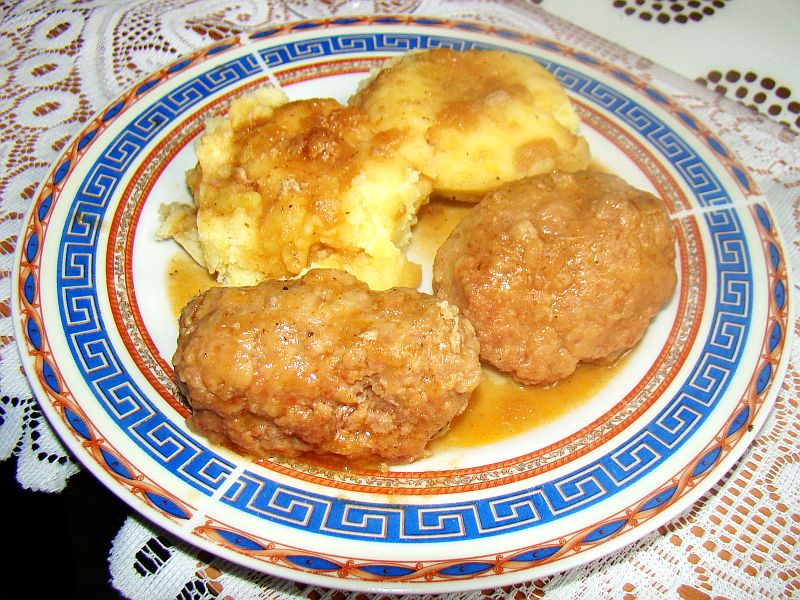
Klopsy with potato purée from Poland

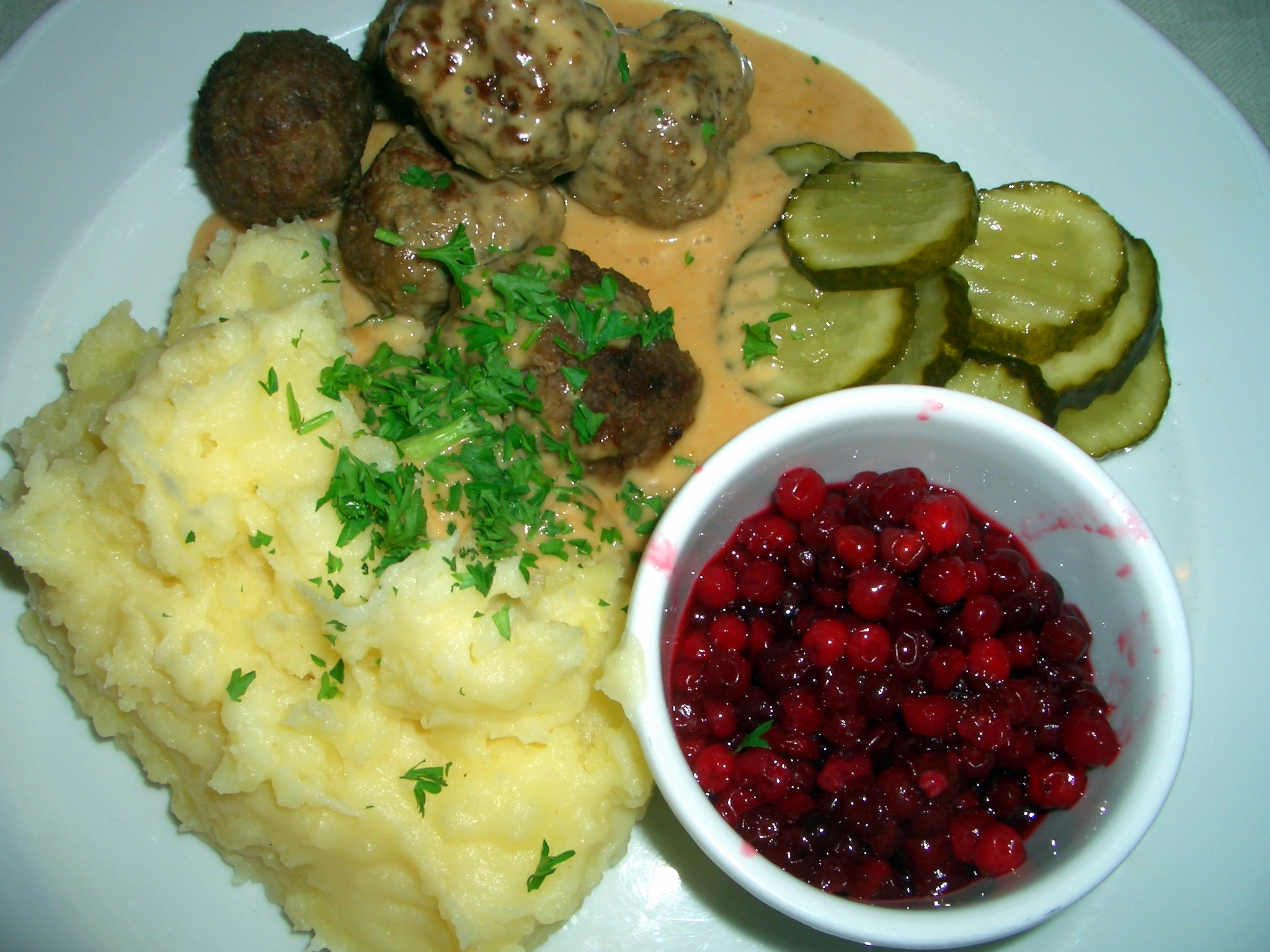
Meatballs served in the Swedish style, with mashed potatoes, brown sauce, lingonberry jam and pickled cucumber

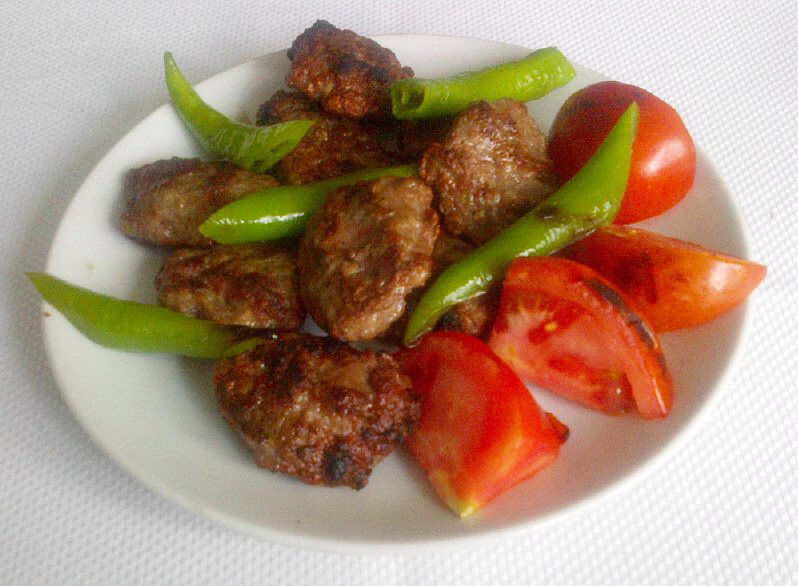
İnegöl meatballs from Turkey

- Albanian fried meatballs (qofte të fërguara) include feta cheese.
- Armenian stewed meatballs/meatball and vegetable stew (kufte rize) is a classic dish often poured over rice for consumption.
- In Austria, fried meatballs are called Fleischlaibchen or Fleischlaberl.
- In Belgium, meatballs are called ballekes or buletten in Flanders and boulettes in Wallonia. They are usually made of a mixture of beef and pork with bread crumbs and sliced onions. Many other variations exist, including different kinds of meat and chopped vegetables. They are often served in tomato sauce or with sour cherry sauce. In Liège, the traditional dish of Boulets à la Liégeoise consists of large meatballs (boulets) served with a sweet and savoury sauce made with Sirop de Liège.
- In Bosnia and Herzegovina and Serbia, meatballs are called ćufte (from the Turkish word köfte) and are typically made from ground beef or ground lamb, usually served with cooked potatoes and salad on the side.
- In Bulgaria, meatballs are called kyufte (from the Turkish word köfte) and are typically made from ground beef or pork, or a mix of the two. They can be shallow-fried or grilled and often contain diced onions and soaked bread. They are a very popular dish. The term can be used for anything from Turkish köfta to Swedish meatballs and has also been used for burger patties.
- In Croatia, meatballs are called polpete in the Dalmatian region or faširani šnicli (faširanci) or ćufte in the continental part. They are typically made with ground beef or a mixture of pork and beef and served with mashed potatoes or rice, often with a tomato-based sauce.
- Danish meatballs are known as frikadeller and are typically fried. They are usually made out of ground pork, veal, onions, eggs, salt, and pepper; these are formed into balls and flattened somewhat, so they are pan ready. However, Danish cuisine also includes other versions, such as boller i karry (meatballs in curry sauce, typically served with rice), and the smaller meatballs used in soup with melboller (Danish dumplings).
- In Estonia, meatballs are called lihapallid (literally "meatballs") and are similar to those of Finnish or Swedish cuisine.
- In Finland, meatballs are called lihapullat (literally "meatbuns"). They are made with ground beef or a mix of ground beef and pork, or even with ground reindeer or elk meat, mixed with breadcrumbs soaked in milk or viili, beef stock and finely chopped onions or alternatively, French onion soup readymix. They are seasoned with white pepper and salt. Meatballs are traditionally served with gravy or brown sauce, boiled potatoes (or mashed potatoes), lingonberry jam, and sometimes pickled cucumber or pickled beetroot.
- In France, meatballs are known as boulettes de viande or (in Northern France) fricadelles. They can be made of beef, veal, pork or fish. In Alsace, meatballs are known as Fleischkiechele. They are made of beef, pork, onions, bacon, eggs, and bread. They are served plain or with cream sauce. In the region of Roussillon, they are known as boles de picolat. In Languedoc, they are served with tomato sauce or in a dish called ragoût d'escoubilles. The term quenelle can also refer to meatballs.
- In Germany, meatballs are mostly known as Frikadelle, Fleischküchle, Fleischpflanzerl, Bulette or Klopse. A notable variant of meatballs are Königsberger Klopse, which contain anchovy or salted herring, and are eaten with caper sauce.
- In Greece, fried meatballs are called keftédes (κεφτέδες) (from the Turkish word köfte) and usually include within the mix of bread, onions, parsley and mint leaf. Stewed meatballs are called yuvarlákia (γιουβαρλάκια: (from the Turkish word yuvarlak, which means "round") and usually include small quantities of rice.
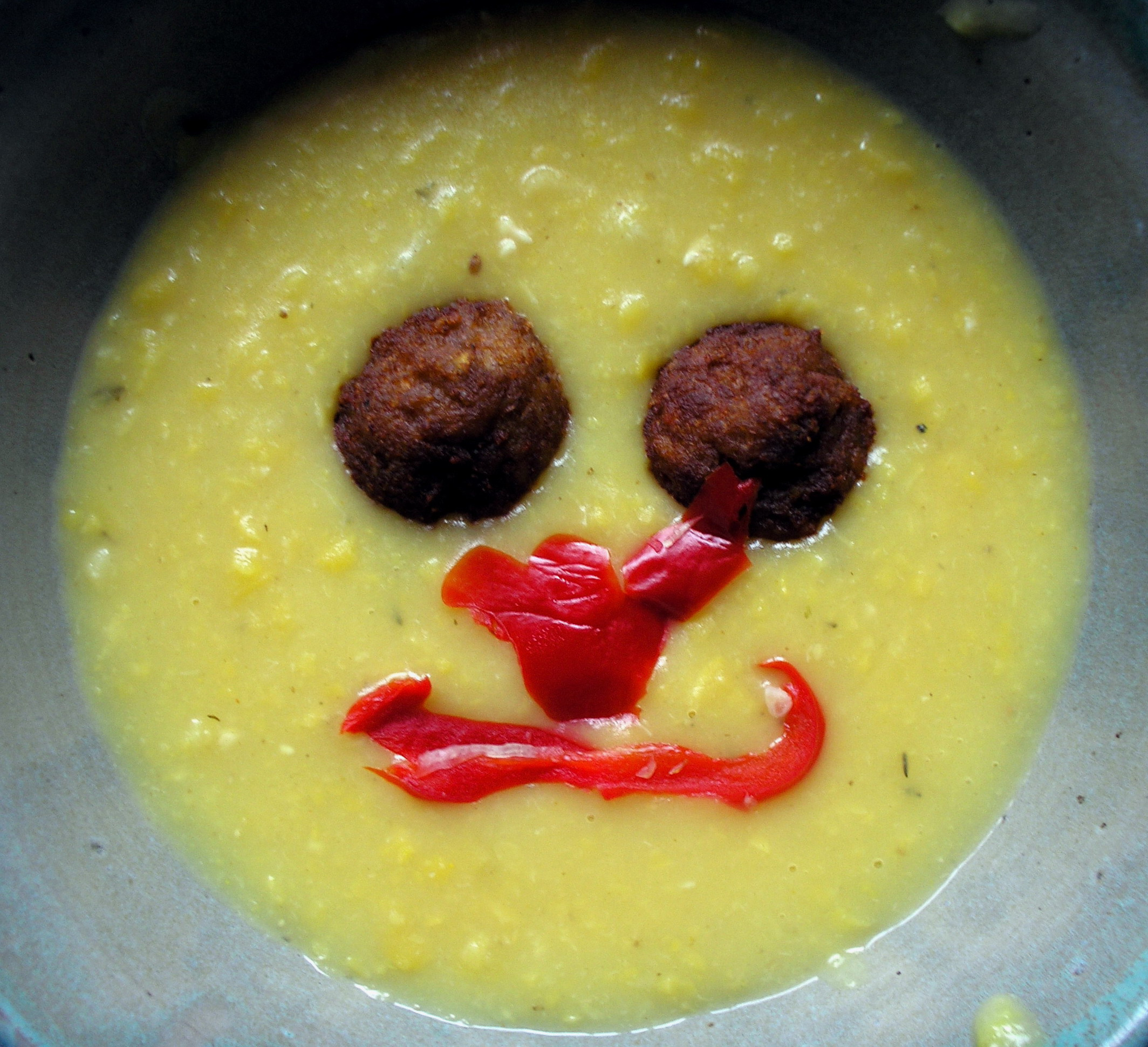
- Fasírt in főzelék. The Hungarian fasírt has a harder crust than its counterparts. Soft meatballs used in Scandinavia or the ones that are put into the soup are called húsgolyó or húsgombóc in Hungarian.
  In Hungary, as well as territories from neighbouring countries where Hungarian is spoken, a meatball is called vagdalt or fasírt [ˈfɒʃiːrt] or fasírozott [ˈfɒʃiːrozott] probably coming from Austrian German faschierte Laibchen. It is a mixture of minced pork, minced onions, garlic, paprika, salt and breadcrumbs, deep fried in oil or pork fat and eaten with potatoes or főzelék. Also, the májgombóc [ˈmaːjɡomboːt͡s] (liver dumpling) is popular in soups.
- In Italy, meatballs (called polpette [polˈpette], sing. polpetta) are generally eaten either as a main course or in soup. The main ingredients of an Italian meatball are beef and/or pork and sometimes poultry or sausage, salt, black pepper, chopped garlic, olive oil, Romano cheese, eggs, bread crumbs, and parsley, mixed and rolled by hand to a golf ball size. In the Abruzzo region of Italy, especially in the Province of Teramo, the meatballs are typically the size of marbles and are called polpettine [polpetˈtiːne].
- In the Netherlands, meatballs are called gehaktbal, and are often served with boiled potatoes and vegetables. They are usually made out of mixed beef and pork minced meat, eggs, onion and bread crumbs.
- In Norway, meatballs are called kjøttkaker (lit. "meatcakes"). They are typically served with gravy (lit. "brown sauce"), kålstuing (cabbage in cream sauce), tyttebærsyltetøy (lingonberry jam) and boiled potatoes. Kjøttkaker are similar to kjøttboller, except in form. Kjøttboller are round, like the typical meatball, whereas kjøttkaker or meat cakes are in a patty form, flattened out, larger than kjøttboller and often somewhat oval in shape.
- In Poland, they are called pulpety (singular pulpet, from the Italian name) or klopsy (singular klops, from German Klopse), and pulpeciki ("little pulpety"), and are usually served cooked with a variety of sauces (such as tomato or a kind of gravy thickened with flour, as well as forest mushroom sauce) with potatoes, rice or all sorts of kasza. Pulpety or klopsy are usually made from seasoned ground meat with onion and mixed with eggs and either breadcrumbs or wheat rolls soaked in milk or water. Fried pulpety are larger than typical cooked ones. They can be round or flat in shape. The latter, in many countries, would be considered a cross between a meatball and a hamburger. The fried variety is called mielony (short for kotlet mielony, literally "minced cutlet"), and its mass-produced version (as well as the one served in bars, etc.) is the subject of many jokes and urban legends about what is used to produce it.
- In Portugal, meatballs are called almôndegas [alˈmõdɨɣɐʃ]. These are usually served with a spicy tomato sauce and rice or sometimes pasta.
- In Romania and Moldova, there are two types of meatballs called chiftele (from the Turkish word köfte) and pârjoale, and are usually deep fried and made with pork or poultry, moistened mashed potatoes and spices. Chiftele are flat and round and contain more meat. A variant mixing rice inside the meatball is used for sour soup, making ciorbă de perişoare.
- In Russia, they are called kotlety (Russian: котлеты) in flat forms or tefteli (Russian: тефтели) in ball forms. They can be made with chicken, pork, beef or fish. Tefteli have rice, potatoes and other vegetables mixed in as well. Kotlety are only made with meat and spices (sometimes bread is added). They can be served with a side of mashed potatoes or noodles, or in a sauce. When boiled in soup round meatballs are called frikadelki (Russian: фрикадельки).
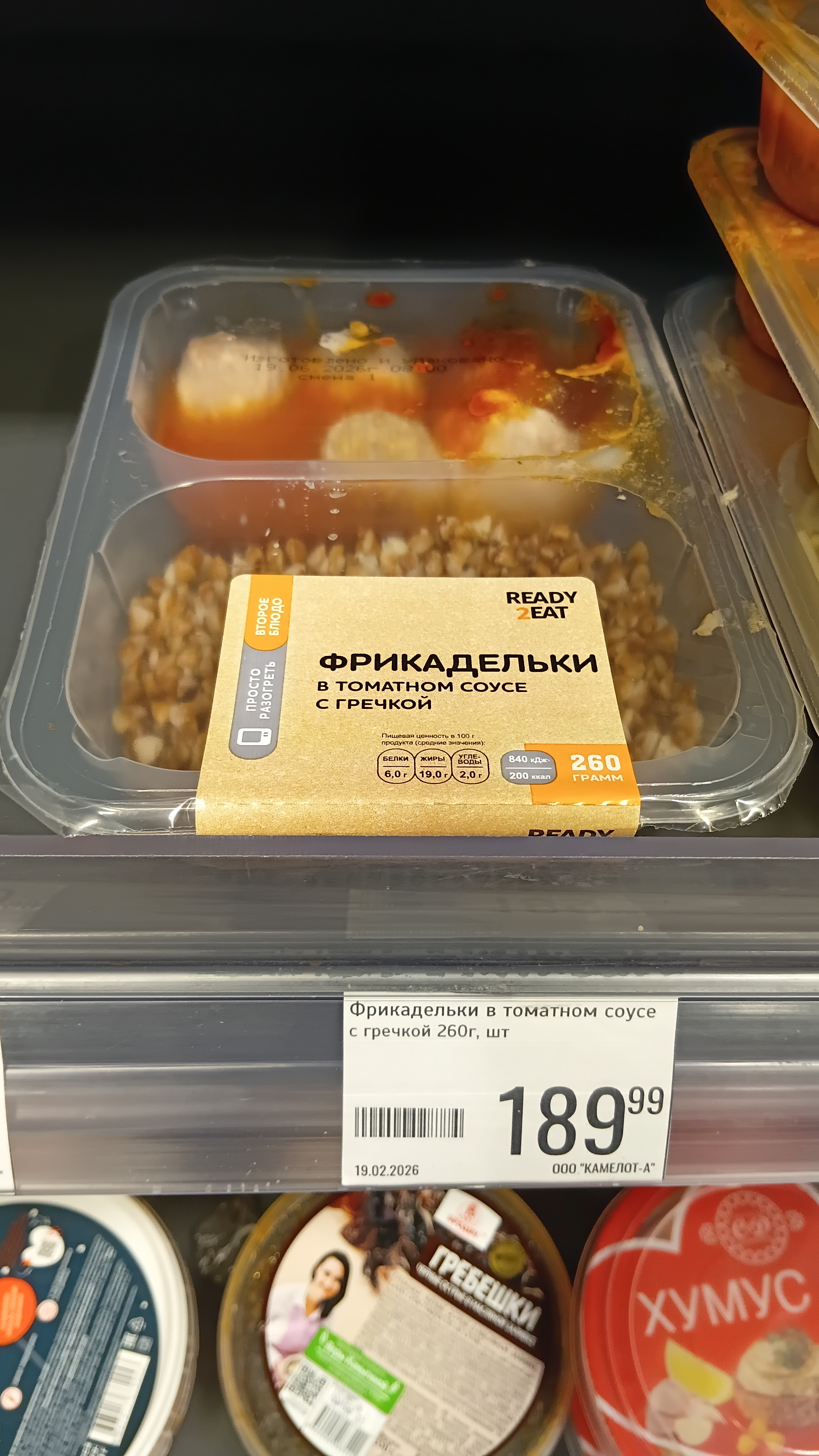
  Ready-made meatballs in tomato sauce on the shelf of one of the Russian stores
- In Slovenia, they are called polpeti. They are typically made with ground beef or a mixture of pork and beef and served with mashed potatoes and tomato-based sauce.
- In Spain and Hispanic America, meatballs are called albóndigas, derived from the Arabic al-bunduq (meaning hazelnut, or, by extension, a small round object). Albóndigas are thought to have originated as a Berber or Arab dish introduced to Spain during the period of Muslim rule. Spanish albóndigas can be served as an appetizer or main course, often in a tomato sauce. Mexican albóndigas are commonly served in a soup with a light broth and vegetables.
- In Sweden, meatballs are called köttbullar (lit. 'meat buns') and are considered a national dish. They became popular in the mid-1800s with the advent of meat grinders. Swedish meatballs are usually made with a mix of ground beef and ground pork, or just with ground beef, which is mixed into a mixture of beaten eggs, breadcrumbs soaked in milk, and grated raw onions or finely chopped and fried onions. Cream is often added for more luxurious versions. The meatball mixture is seasoned with salt and white pepper or a mixture of white pepper and allspice. Swedish meatballs are traditionally served with gravy, boiled or mashed potatoes, lingonberry jam, and sometimes pickled cucumber. Traditionally, they are small, around 2–4 centimetres (0.79–1.57 in) in diameter, though larger meatballs are often served at restaurants. The term köttbulle first appeared in 1755 in Cajsa Warg's cookbook, previously since the mid-1600s, they were more commonly called frikadeller. IKEA, a furniture retailer founded in Sweden, introduced Swedish meatballs to its cafeterias in 1985, and – as of 2022 – serves over one billion meatballs annually worldwide. In 2018, a user on Sweden's official Twitter account claimed that Swedish meatballs originated in a Turkish recipe brought to Sweden by King Charles XII in 1714 after his exile in the Ottoman Empire. The claim garnered international attention but was later refuted. Leading food historian Richard Tellström stated there was no evidence behind the claim. The Twitter account retracted the statement shortly after. Later on, an advert from Scandinavian Airlines also claimed the Turkish origin but it was reverted after a public backlash.
- In Turkey, meatballs are called köfte and are extremely popular; there are many different versions with a variety of shapes – not necessarily round. Meatballs in Turkey are usually made with ground lamb or a mix of ground beef and lamb. Variants are mostly named after their traditional cities, such as İnegöl köfte and Tire köfte. Some of the other popular ones are şiş köfte, kadınbudu köfte and sulu köfte. There is also a variant called Çiğ köfte that can be vegan. There is also vegan köfte made from bulgur and lentils called Mercimek köftesi.
- In Ukraine, they are called kotleta (Ukrainian: котлета) when fried and frykadelka (Ukrainian: фрикаделька) when boiled in soup.
- In the United Kingdom, faggots are a type of highly seasoned pork meatball, usually served in a savoury gravy. A faggot is traditionally made from pig's 'lights' (lungs, heart, liver, and occasionally windpipe (cf. haggis)) and a fatty cut of pork (pork belly or back bacon) minced together, with onions, herbs and spices for flavouring, and sometimes breadcrumbs as a filler. There is a marked similarity between types of ingredients used for both Faggots and Haggis: both use the basic meat ingredients of lungs, heart, liver, and very traditionally windpipe, albeit pork for faggots and lamb for haggis; additional meat content is provided for both by using belly of pork for faggots and breast of lamb for haggis; 'filler'/'bulking' ingredients are carbohydrate-based - breadcrumbs for faggots and oats for haggis; both use onion as a savoury component; herbs and spices for both faggots and haggis are often generalised and more often than not specific to a particular producer or traditional family recipe. Whilst faggots are sometimes wrapped in caul fat or the stringy exterior of the liver before frying or baking, haggis is traditionally stuffed into a sheep's stomach before boiling/simmering.

=== Americas ===
A meatball pizza

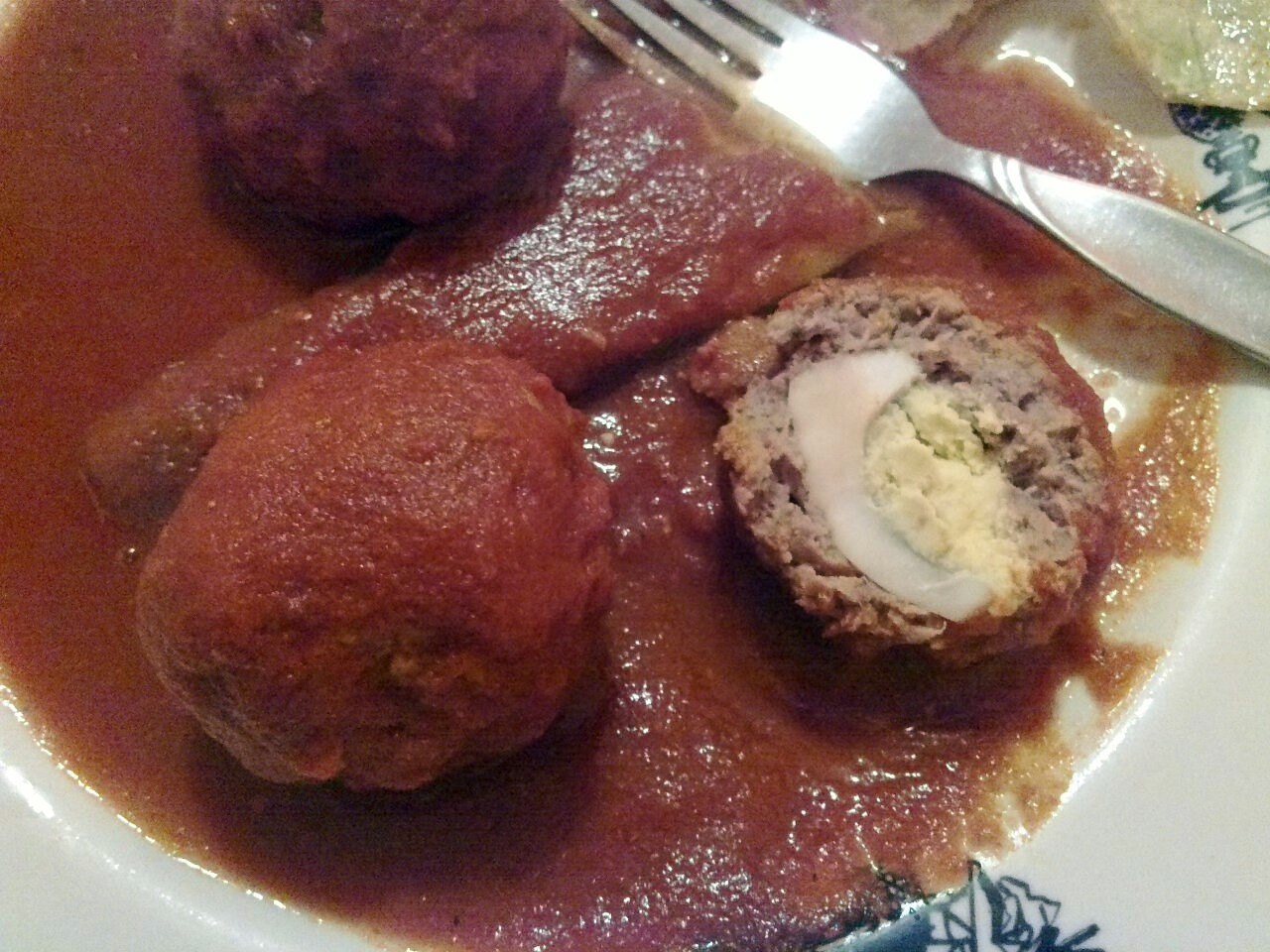
Mexican albóndigas al chipotle

Most meatball recipes found in the Americas are derived from European cuisine influences, notably Italian, Sicily, Iberian (Portuguese-Spanish), and Nordic (Swedish) cuisines.

- In Brazil, meatballs are called almôndegas, a name that comes from Portuguese influence. However, they are also known as polpetas (or porpetas), a term influenced by Italian cuisine. The Italian-style version is often stuffed with mozzarella cheese. Both are commonly served with tomato sauce and pasta.
- In the Canadian province of Quebec, meatballs are the main component of a traditional dish called ragoût de boulettes (meatball stew). The meatballs are made with ground pork, onions, spices like cinnamon, cloves and nutmeg and are simmered in a gravy thickened with toasted flour. The dish is normally served with boiled or mashed potatoes and pickled beets. It is so popular that a factory-processed version of the dish is available canned in most supermarkets throughout the province.
- In Mexico, albóndigas are commonly served with a light broth and vegetables, or with a mild chipotle sauce.
- In Puerto Rico, they are called albóndigas and have a strong Italian influence. Puerto Ricans living in New York City brought the recipe back to Puerto Rico, because many Puerto Ricans in New York City lived side by side with Italians. The meatballs are usually seasoned with sofrito, olives, capers, cheese, egg, breadcrumbs, parsley, carrots, mint, adobo, sazon (annatto, paprika, cumin, and coriander seeds), almonds, and coffee. It is typically eaten in a sandwich with melted cheese on top or stewed in tomato sauce, or with rice, in a dinner called Arroz con albondigas (rice with meatballs)
- In the United States, meatballs are commonly derived from European cuisines. They are usually served with spaghetti, on pizza, or on a sub (e.g., spaghetti and meatballs, meatball pizza, and meatball sandwiches). In the Southern United States, venison or beef is also often mixed with spices and baked into large meatballs that can be served as an entrée. Another variation, "porcupine meatballs", consists of basic meatballs often with rice in them. Several varieties of meatball pizza exist, such as Tex-Mex and Greek-style lamb sweet-and-sour. The meatballs on meatball pizzas may be sliced to reduce their size, sliced in half, or broken up and spread out across the pizza.

=== Middle East and South Asia ===
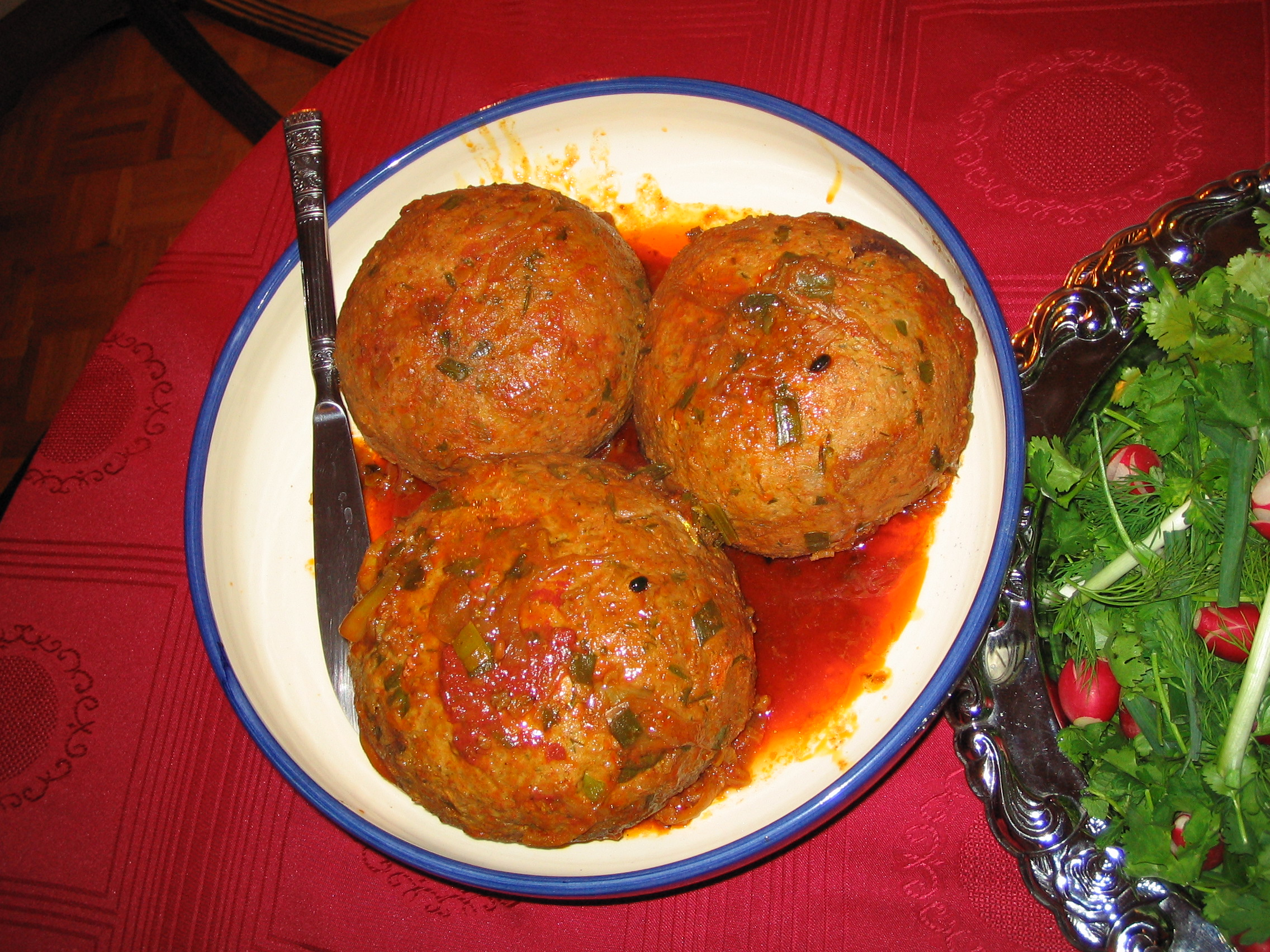
Kufte Tabrīzī

Kofta is a type of meatball or dumpling that is widely distributed in Middle Eastern, South Asian, Mediterranean and Balkan (Central and Eastern Europe) cuisines. The word kofta is derived from Persian kūfta: In Persian, کوفتن (kuftan) means "to beat" or "to grind" or 'meatball'. In the simplest form, koftas consist of balls or fingers of minced or ground meat – usually beef or lamb – mixed with spices and/or onions and other ingredients. The vegetarian variety is popular in India. They can be grilled, fried, steamed, poached, baked or marinated, and may be served with a rich spicy sauce.

- In Afghanistan, meatballs are used as a traditional dish with homemade soups or are made with a tomato-based sauce that may include some plum seeds to increase tartness and is served with bread or rice which is called Kofta-Chelou. Nowadays meatballs are also grilled on top of pizza.
- In Iran, several types of meatballs are consumed. If they are cooked in a stew, they are called kufteh. If they are fried (typically small meatballs), they are called kal-e gonjeshki (literally "sparrow's head"). Both types are consumed with either bread or rice. Typically, herbs are added, and for kufteh, usually the meatball is filled with hard-boiled eggs or dried fruits. There are several (at least 10) types; the most famous is "kufte Tabrīzī", traditionally from Tabriz in northwestern Iran.
- In Israel, meatballs are called ktzitzot basar (Hebrew: קציצות בשר), or sometimes simply ktzitzot (Hebrew: קציצות). Their exact ingredients and preparation vary widely, due to the influence of Jewish immigration from different regions. They are typically made of spiced ground beef, though turkey and chicken versions are also available, and in their common form, they are shaped as slightly flattened balls, pan-fried and then cooked in tomato sauce or broth. Other variations also exist, including the gondi, which were brought by the Persian Jews, the albondigas of the Sephardic cuisine, and the kufta that is customary with some Mizrahi Jews.
- Meatballs are popular in South Asian cuisine. In India, vegetarian versions of koftas are made with paneer, potato, bottle gourd, raw banana or other vegetables. South Asian meatballs are normally cooked in a spicy curry. In Pakistan, they are cooked in a gravy called chorba. Sometimes whole pre-boiled eggs are added, and sometimes the eggs are encased in a layer of the kofta meat to make something resembling a Scotch egg. These kofta dishes are very popular with Indian diaspora and are available in many Indian restaurants.
- In Syria, meatballs are prepared in numerous ways. They are grilled on charcoal with or without eggplants or cooked in a stew with potato, onion and tomato sauce with a side of rice which is called Dawood Pasha.
- In the West Bengal state of India and Bangladesh, koftas are made with prawns, fish, green bananas, and cabbage, as well as minced goat meat.

=== East and Southeast Asia ===
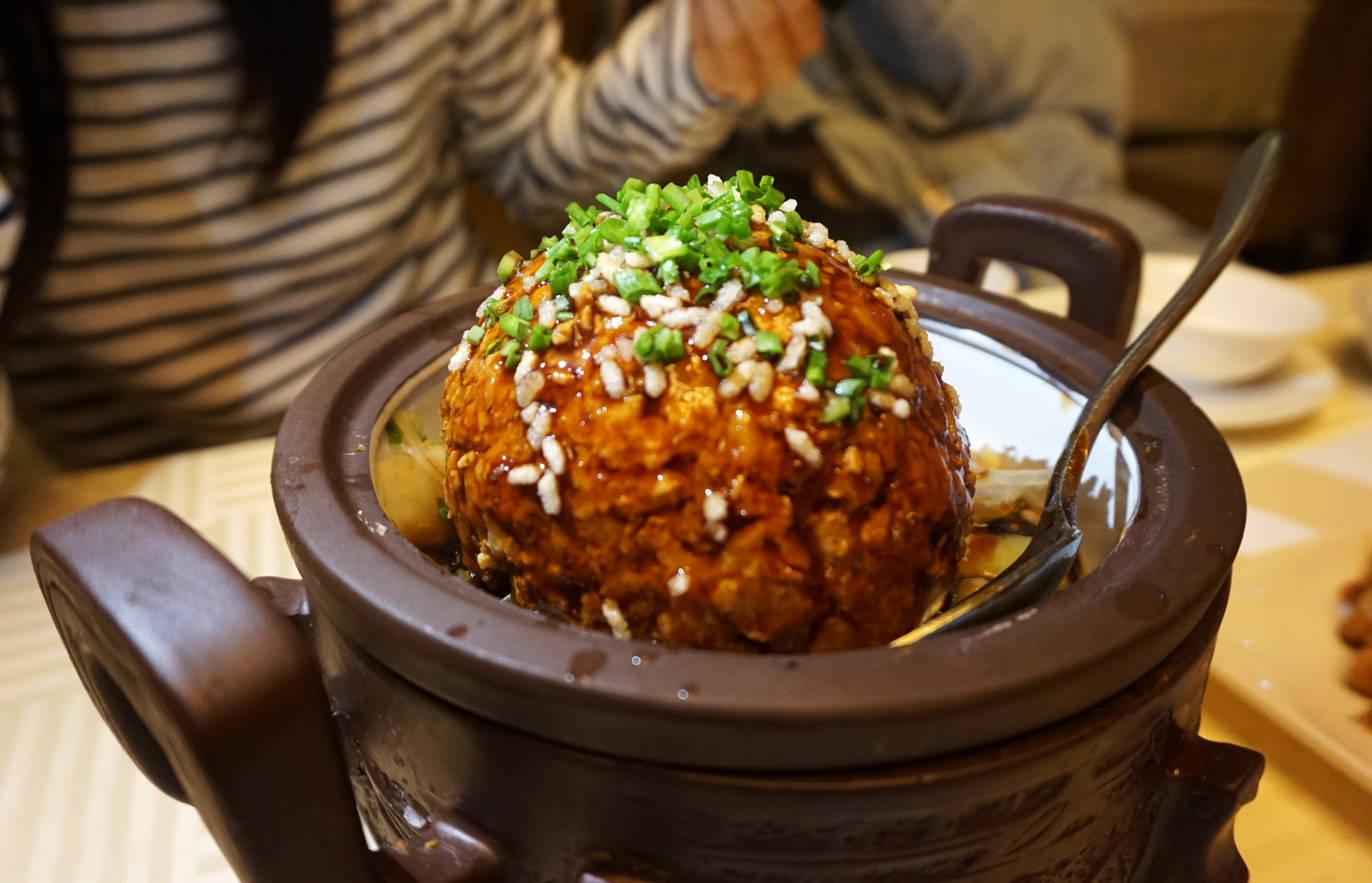
A lion's head meatball from China

- Chinese meatballs (wanzi) are typically made of pork and can be steamed, boiled or deep-fried, sometimes with the addition of soy sauce. Large meatballs, called lion's heads, can range in size from about 5–10 cm (2.0–3.9 in) in diameter. Smaller varieties, called pork balls, are used in soups. A Cantonese variant, the steamed meatball, is made of beef and served as a dim sum dish. Pearl meatballs are made of pork coated with glutinous rice. Fish and seafood can also be used to create different flavors and textures, and vegetarian alternatives to meatballs are served during festivals. In northern China, meatballs made from minced meat and flour, sometimes with the addition of lotus root or water chestnut for texture, are deep-fried and served in a vinegar-based sweet and sour sauce, or in a light broth with chopped coriander.

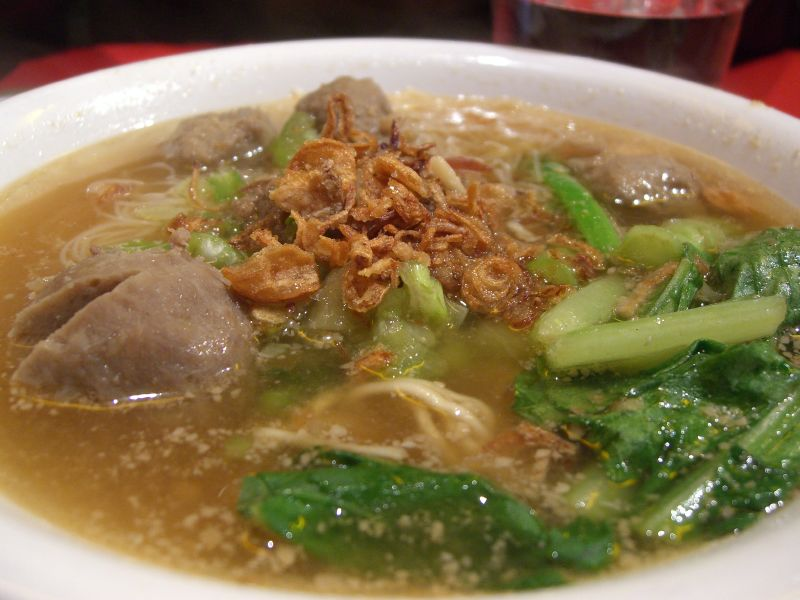
Indonesian bakso noodle soup

- Indonesian meatballs are called bakso which are usually served in a bowl, served in broth soup, with noodles, rice vermicelli, bean curd (tofu), hard-boiled egg, siomay steamed meat dumpling, and fried wonton. They have a consistent homogeneous texture. Bakso can be found in major Indonesian cities and towns; however, the most popular are bakso Solo and bakso Malang (named after the city of origin). In Malang, bakso bakar (roasted bakso) is also popular. As most Indonesians are Muslim, generally it is made from beef or sometimes chicken.
- In Japanese cuisine, a popular variant of meatballs is tsukune, minced chicken meatballs on a skewer. Chinese-style meatballs are also popular. Another kind of meatball called tsumire is made from ground fish. This is often added to soups or nabes (stews).
- In the Philippines, meatballs are called bola-bola or almondigas and are usually served in a misua noodle soup with toasted garlic, squash and pork cracklings. Bola-bola are derived from Hispanic influence on Filipino cuisine and ultimately derived from Moorish influence. Bola-bola are also stewed or pan-fried until golden brown. Bola-bola is also used as a filling for siopao, the local variant of baozi.
- In Thailand, meatballs (luk chin) are various. The materials can be pork, beef, chicken and fish. The finished meatballs can be incorporated into many dishes. They can be grilled, deep-fried, eaten with dipping sauce, or used as a component of noodle soups.
- In Vietnam, meatballs (thịt viên or mọc, bò viên, cá viên) can be used as an ingredient in phở and hủ tiếu. It is also common to cook meatballs in tomato sauce, and finely chopped spring onion and peppers are added before serving. In bún chả (a specialty Vietnamese rice noodle), meatballs are grilled to be chả and served with bún (rice noodles) and dipping sauce (based on fish sauce seasoned with rice vinegar, sugar, garlic, and chili). Xíu nại is a pork meatball in a tomato sauce often served with a baguette.
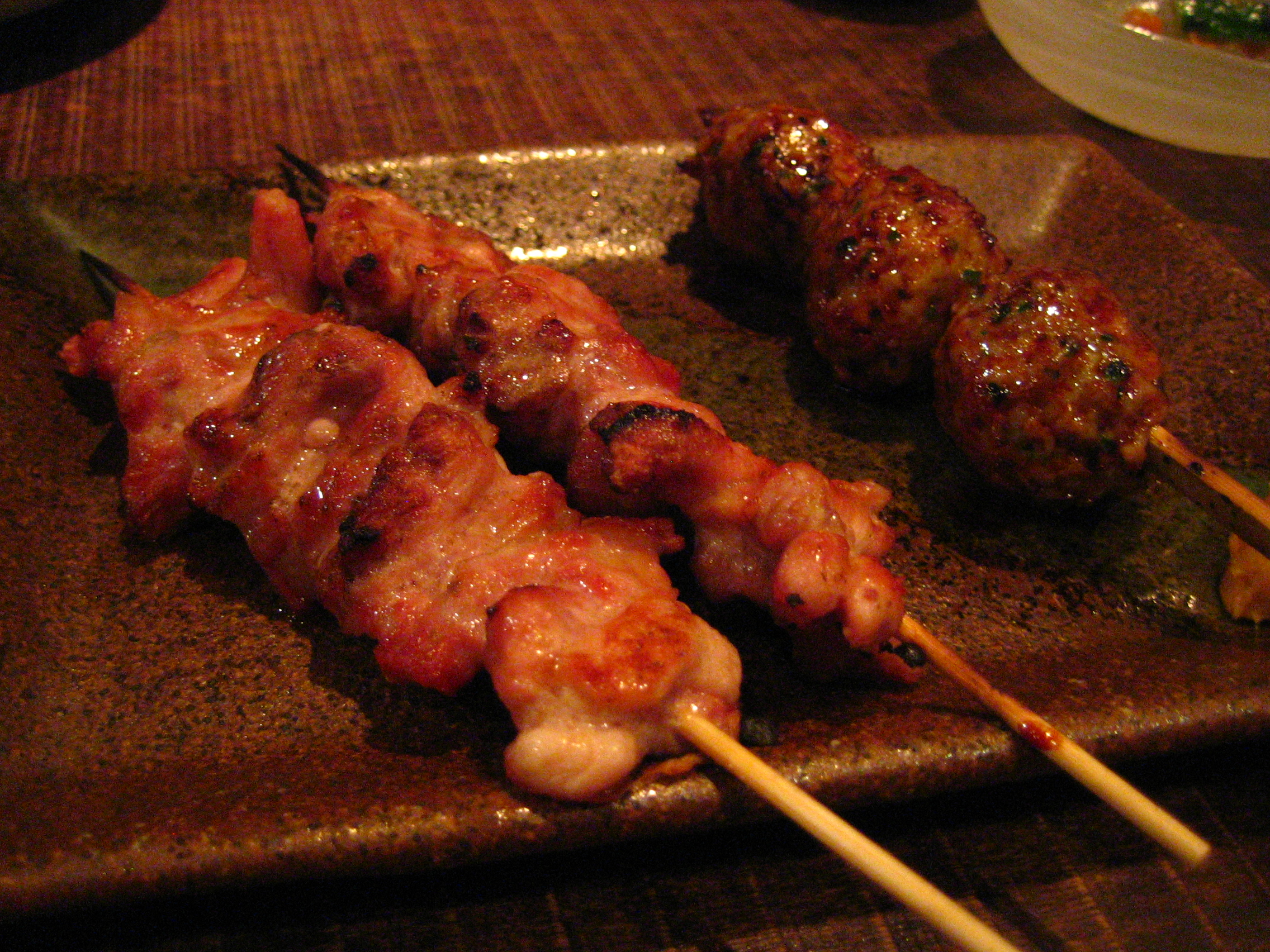
Japanese seseri (left) and tsukune (つくね) (right)

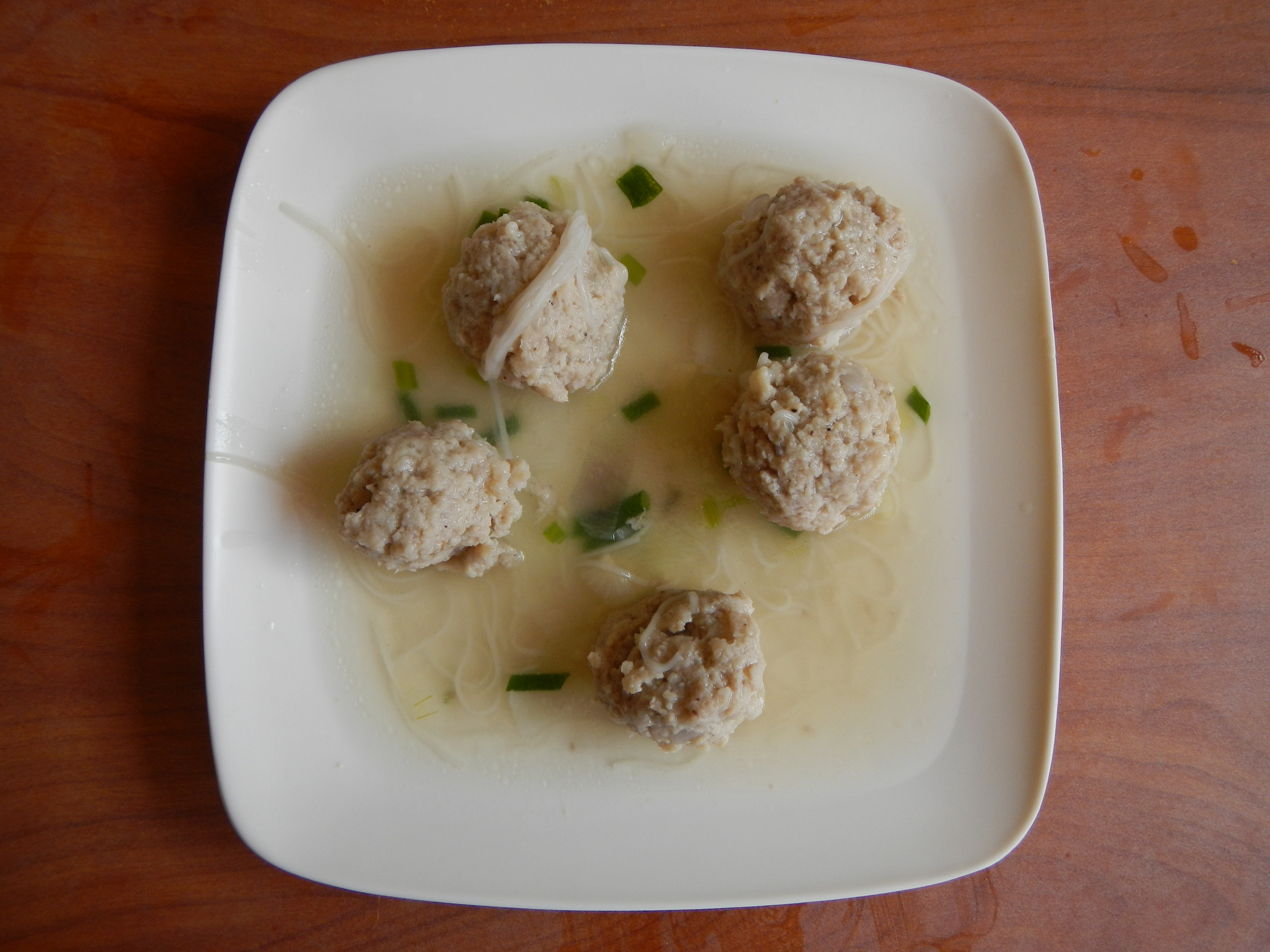
Bola-bola with misua from the Philippines

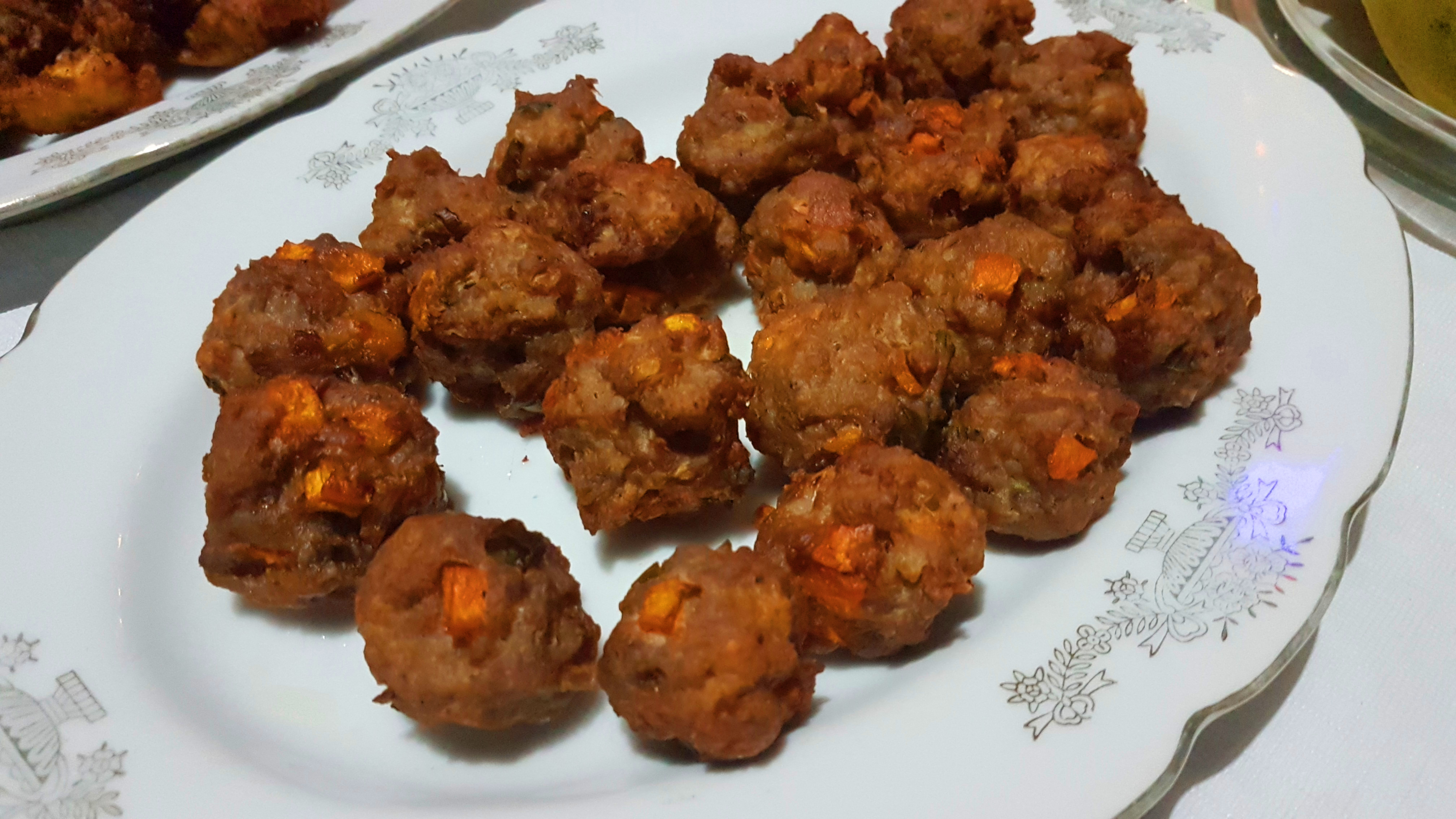
Fried bola-bola from the Philippines

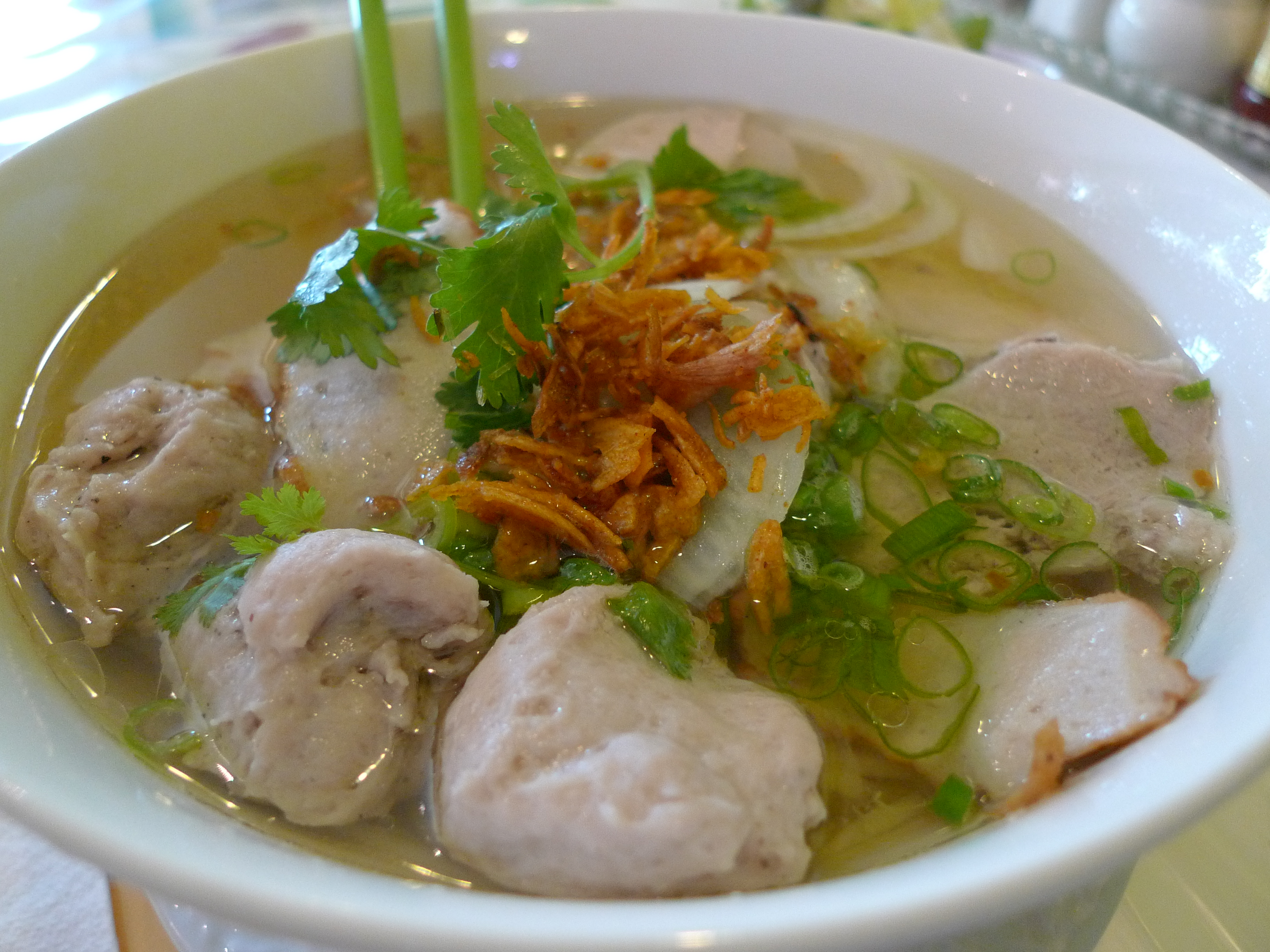
Bowl of bún mọc in Vietnam. Bún is rice vermicelli, while mọc means pork ball.

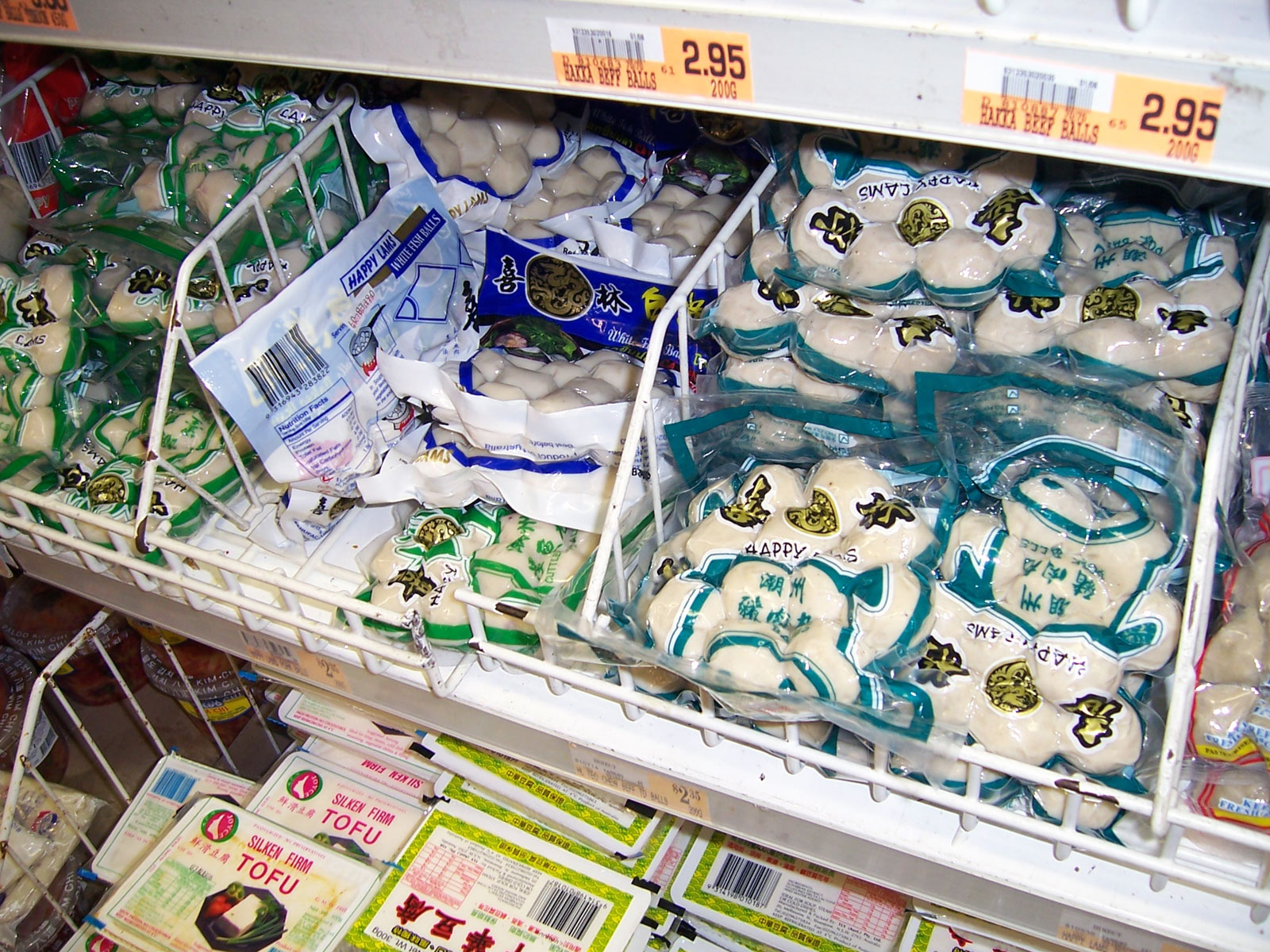
A variety of Chinese meatballs and fishballs

== See also ==
- Frikandel, a Belgian and Dutch snack, similar in texture to meatballs, but shaped more like a hot dog or sausage than a ball
- List of meatball dishes
- Rissole
- Meatloaf
