= Hochzeitssuppe =

German soup

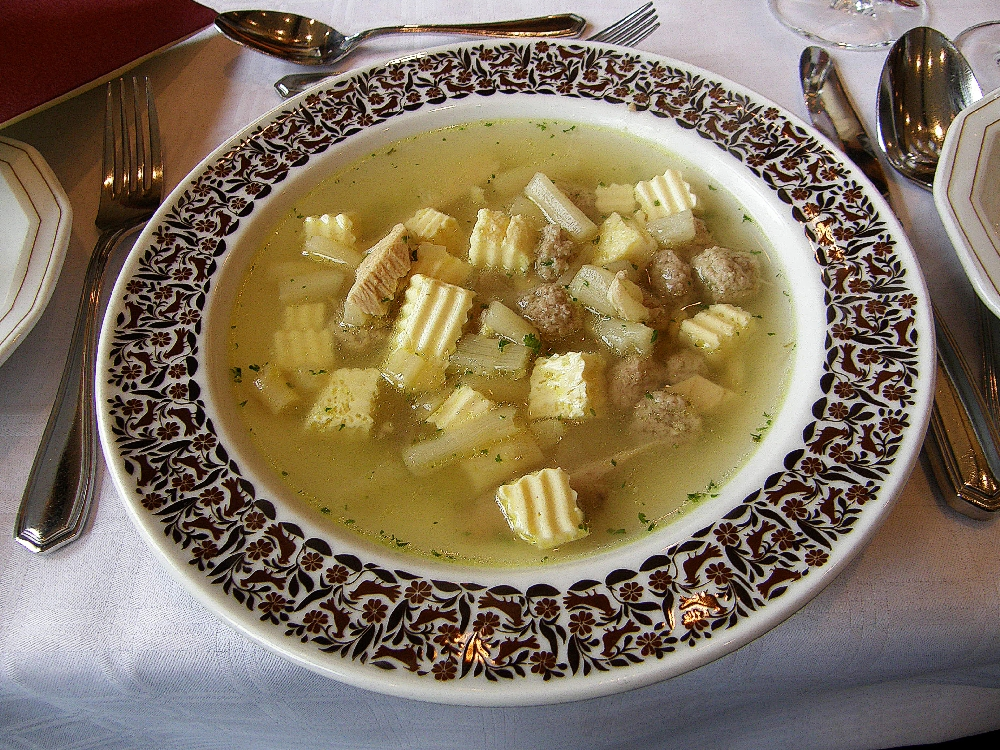
- Hochzeitssuppe with meatballs, asparagus, and egg custard
- Type: Wedding soup
- Place of origin: Germany
- Main ingredients: Chicken broth, chicken meat, meatballs, asparagus heads, noodles, cooked eggs

Hochzeitssuppe (lit. 'wedding soup') is a German soup based on chicken broth, fortified with chicken meat, small meatballs (Fleischklößchen), asparagus heads, noodles, and savoury egg custard garnish (Eierstich). Sometimes raisins are added as well.

Hochzeitssuppe is eaten in northern Germany and southern Germany by the bride and groom and guests, traditionally after the wedding ceremony, and it is usually served as the starter on the menu at the wedding reception. It is also eaten in other regions of Germany, because the Brautsuppe ('bride's soup') served to all the guests used to be an element of every wedding.

A variation is the Westfälische Hochzeitssuppe ('Westphalian wedding soup'), a broth which is traditionally prepared from beef. This also forms the entrée on wedding menus, followed by the cold meat from which the broth had been prepared, served with remoulade, silverskin onions, and pickled gherkins as a second course.

There are numerous recipes for Hochzeitssuppe in regional cookbooks. At retail outlets there are also varieties of instant soups that go by this name.

== See also ==
- List of German soups
