= Yuvarlakia =

Meatball soup or stew

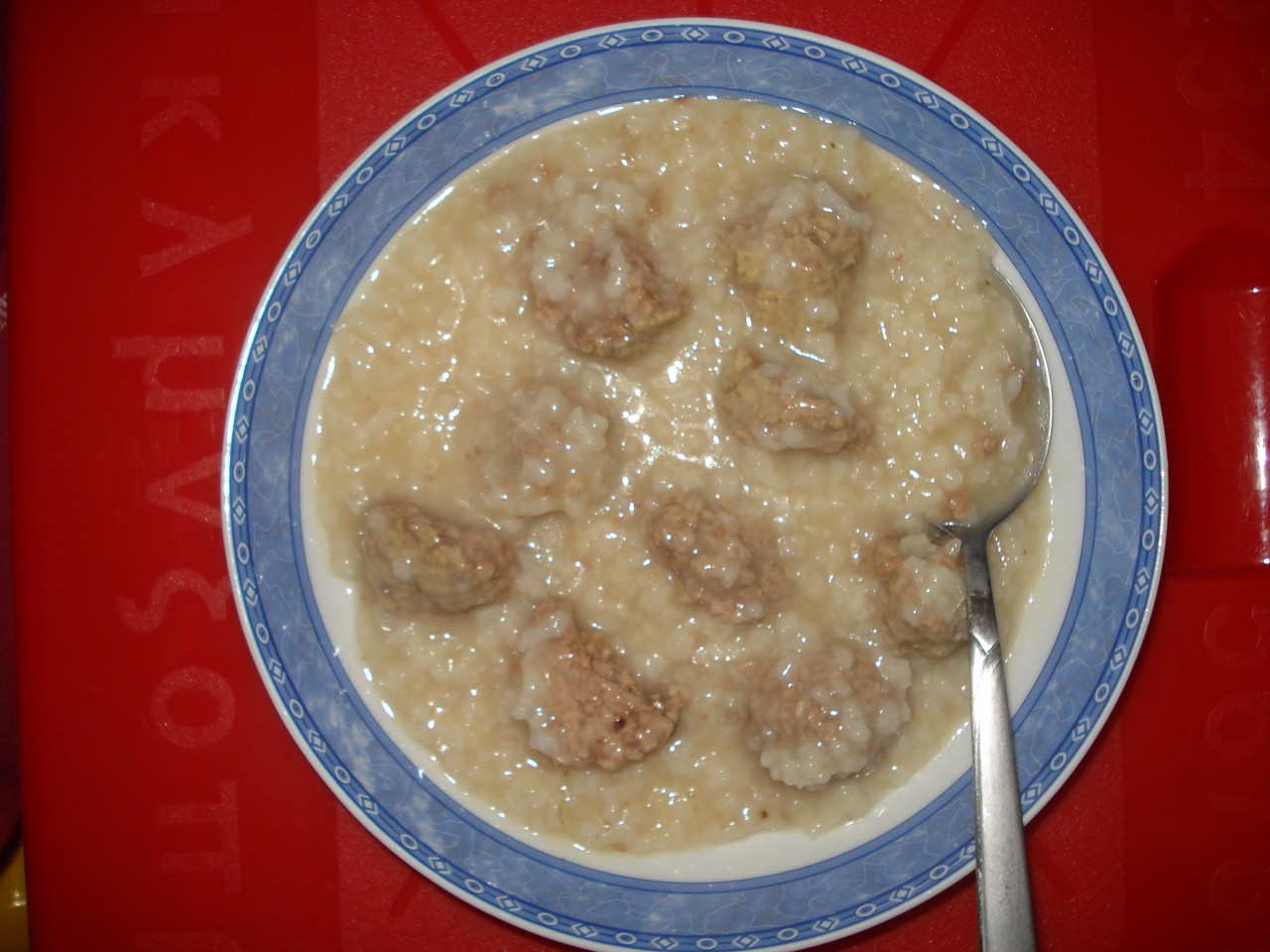
- Greek yuvarlakia
- Alternative names: Yuvarlakia avgolemono, ekşili köfte, terbiyeli köfte, sulu köfte
- Type: Soup or stew
- Place of origin: Anatolia
- Main ingredients: Ground meat, rice, avgolemono sauce
- Ingredients generally used: Carrot, potato, yogurt, tomato sauce
- Variations: Sulu köfte

Yuvarlakia (Note: Also known as yuvarlakia avgolemono; also spelled as youvarlakia or giouvarlakia) (Greek: γιουβαρλάκια) or ekşili köfte (Note: Also known as terbiyeli köfte, sulu köfte, or any combination thereof) is a meatball soup or stew in Greek and Turkish cuisine. It consists of balls of ground meat mixed with rice, onions, herbs, and spices, which are simmered in a pot with water or meat broth, and then finished in avgolemono (egg-and-lemon sauce) or tomato sauce. The Turkish version additionally includes carrots and potatoes, and flour and yogurt in the sauce. Depending on the thickness of the sauce, it may be considered a soup or a stew. The mixture is similar to that used for making sarma.

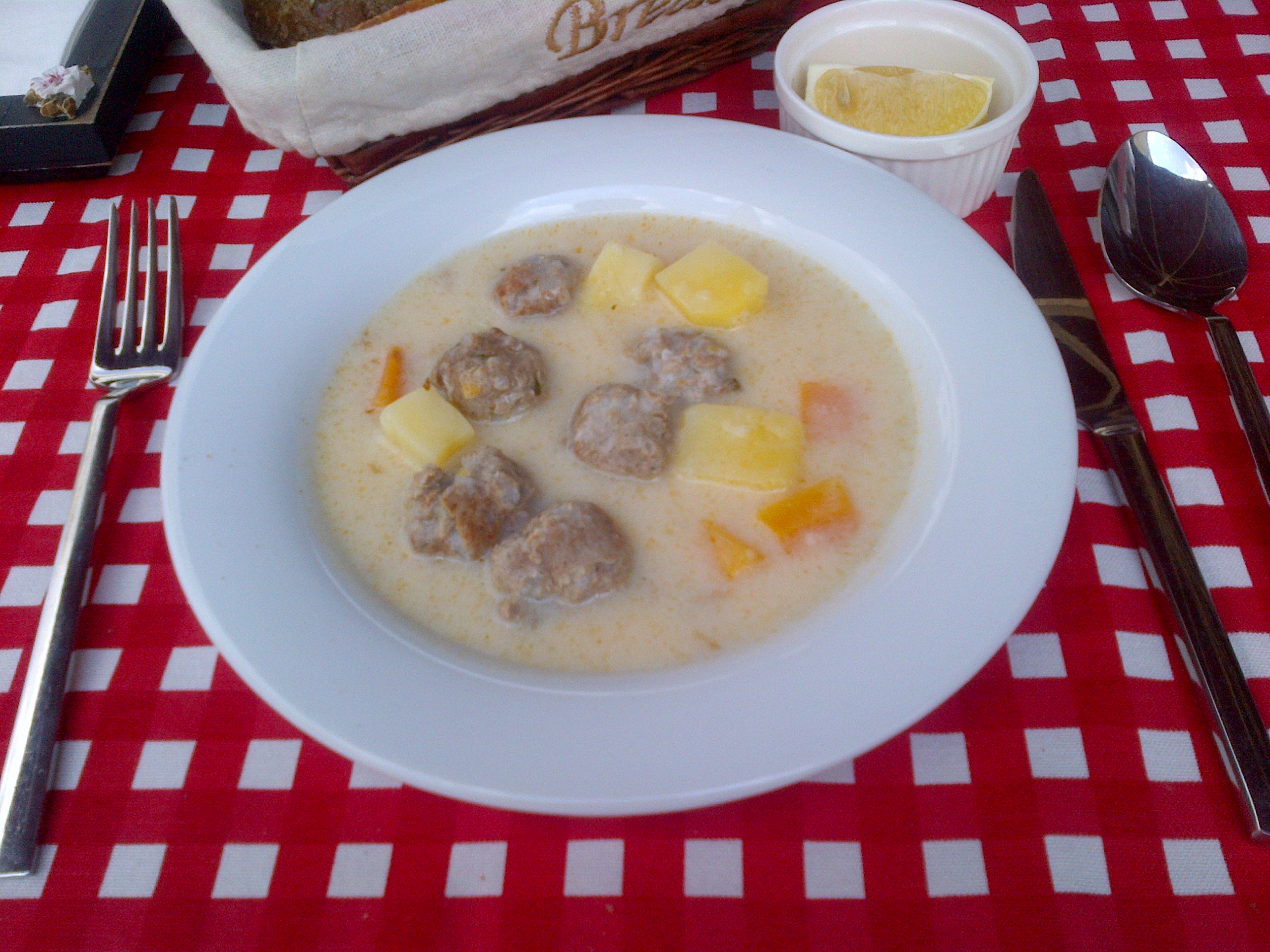
Turkish ekşili köfte

== Etymology ==
The name yuvarlakia (Greek: γιουβαρλάκια) is derived from the Turkish word yuvarlak, meaning "round" or "spherical," in reference to the shape of the dish's main component: small, round meatballs. The Greek plural suffix -ia is commonly added to denote a collective or diminutive form, making yuvarlakia roughly translate to "little round ones". The term reflects the influence of Turkish cuisine and broader Ottoman cuisine on Greek cuisine, particularly in regions where the two cultures historically intersected.

In Turkish, the dish is known as ekşili köfte, as well as terbiyeli köfte or sulu köfte. The word terbiye is the Turkish term for the avgolemono sauce, meaning "treatment" or "improvement".

== History ==
The dish is believed to have originated in Anatolia during the Ottoman Empire, where culinary techniques crossed Greek, Turkish, Armenian and Jewish cuisines. It was introduced to Greece by Asia Minor Greeks after the population exchange between Greece and Turkey.

Ottoman Turkish cookbooks Melceü't-Tabbâhîn and Fenn-i Tabâhat give recipes for terbiyeli köfte. The method of preparation for terbiyeli köfte in Melceü't-Tabbâhîn is as follows:

Obtain finely chopped lamb meat, add a generous amount of onions, salt, and pepper, roll into small balls the size of hazelnuts, and cook in water only, then place in a pan. Afterwards, crack a few eggs, whisk them with a generous amount of salt and lemon juice, and stir over the heat. When the mixture begins to thicken, add a spoonful of the broth from the cooked meatballs to each one to temper it, then pour it over the meatballs. This is a well-known method.

== Variations ==
=== Greece ===
In Greece, the best-known preparation is yuvarlakia avgolemono (Greek: γιουβαρλακια αυγολεμονο), which features medium-sized meatballs finished with an egg-and-lemon (avgolemono) mixture. Alternatively, yuvarlakia kokkinista (Greek: γιουβαρλακια κοκκινιστα) is simmered in a tomato sauce instead of avgolemono sauce.

=== Turkey ===
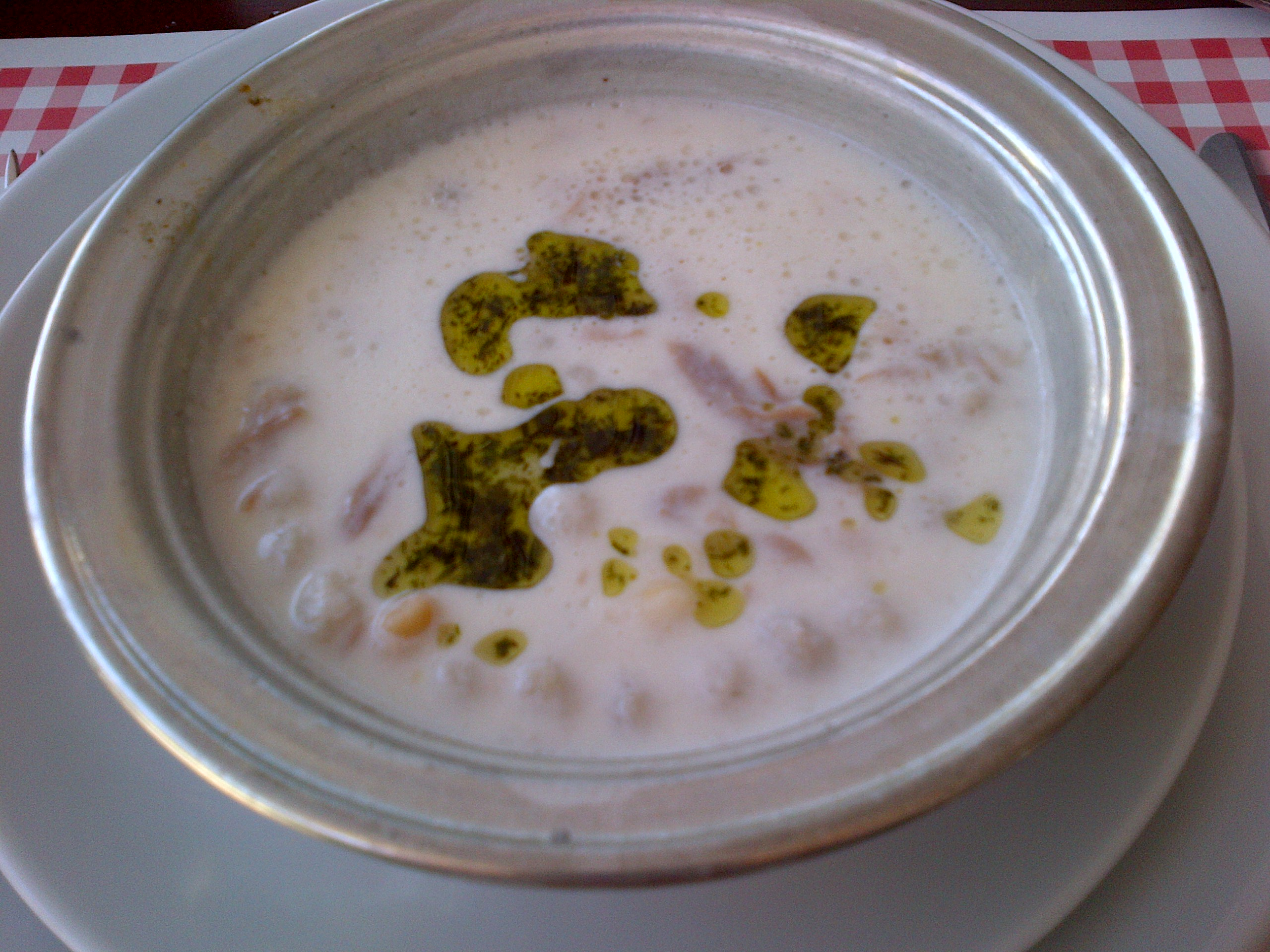
Yuvalama soup from Gaziantep

Ekşili köfte (also known as terbiyeli köfte or sulu köfte) resemble the Greek style in meatball size and avgolemono sauce but differ in the additions. Carrots and potatoes are cubed and boiled in the broth alongside the meatballs, while the avgolemono sauce is generally blended with strained yogurt and flour. The final dish is often finished with a sizzled garnish of dried mint infused in hot butter or olive oil.

Instead of large meatballs, a regional variant from Gaziantep called yuvalama or yuvarlama çorbası uses a large number of small, chickpea-sized balls made from lean ground meat and rice flour. They are steamed, then combined in a strained-yogurt broth with pre-cooked chickpeas and chunks of stewed lamb or beef.

== See also ==
- List of meatball dishes
- Avgolemono
- Sulu köfte
