= Alhazred =

Alhazred may refer to:

- Abdul Alhazred, a fictional character created by American horror writer H. P. Lovecraft
- Alhazred (novel), a 2006 novel by Cthulhu Mythos writer Donald Tyson
