= William Crooke bibliography =

This list of the works of William Crooke (1848–1923) represents much of his literary output in pursuit of his interests in ethnology and folklore, for which he was far many years considered to be a leading authority.

In addition to the items listed below in respect of Folk-Lore Record and its successor, Folk-Lore, the journal of the Folklore Society, Crooke also contributed frequently to that journal in the form of letters and brief observations. He was editor of the journal from 1915 until his death.

In addition to these works, Crooke made many contributions to the Encyclopedia of Religion and Ethics.

He had been editing the Katha Sagara Kosa, as translated by Charles Henry Tawney, at the time of his death.

== Books — authored ==
- Crooke, William (1888). A Rural and Agricultural Glossary for the N.W. Provinces and Oudh. Printed by the Superintendent of Government Printing. India.
- Crooke, William (1890). An Ethnographic Handbook for the N.W.P. & Oudh. Allahabad.
- Crooke, William (1894). An introduction to the popular religion and folklore of northern India. Printed at the government press, North-Western Provinces and Oudh.
- Crooke, William (1896). An introduction to the popular religion and folklore of northern India, Volume I (Revised and illustrated ed.). Printed at the government press, North-Western Provinces and Oudh.
- Crooke, William (1896). An introduction to the popular religion and folklore of northern India, Volume II (Revised and illustrated ed.). Printed at the government press, North-Western Provinces and Oudh.
- Crooke, William (1896). The tribes and castes of the North-western Provinces and Oudh, Volume I. Calcutta: Office of the Superintendent of Government Printing, India.
- Crooke, William (1896). The tribes and castes of the North-western Provinces and Oudh, Volume II. Calcutta: Office of the Superintendent of Government Printing, India.
- Crooke, William (1896). The tribes and castes of the North-western Provinces and Oudh, Volume III. Calcutta: Office of the Superintendent of Government Printing, India.
- Crooke, William (1896). The tribes and castes of the North-western Provinces and Oudh, Volume IV. Calcutta: Office of the Superintendent of Government Printing, India.
- Crooke, William (1897). The North-Western Provinces of India: their history, ethnology, and administration. London: Methuen.
- Crooke, William (1906). Things Indian: being discursive notes on various subjects connected with India. [Great Britain printed] C. Scribner's sons.
- Crooke, William (1907). Natives of northern India. Native Races of the British Empire. A. Constable and Company, Ltd.

== Books — edited ==
- Crooke, William, ed. (1891). North Indian notes and queries, Volumes 1, 2. Allahabad: Pioneer Press.
- Yule, Sir Henry; Burnell, Arthur Coke (1903). Crooke, William (ed.). Hobson-Jobson: a glossary of colloquial Anglo-Indian words and phrases, and of kindred terms, etymological, historical, geographical and discursive. London: J. Murray.
- Fryer, John (1909–1915) [1698]. Crooke, William (ed.). New Account of East India and Persia. Works issued by the Hakluyt Society,2d ser., no. 19-20, 39. Hakluyt Society.
- Risley, Sir Herbert Hope (1915) [1908]. Crooke, William (ed.). The people of India (Memorial ed.). Calcutta: Thacker, Spink.
- Ali, Mrs Meer Hassan (1917). Crooke, William (ed.). Observations on the Mussulmauns of India: descriptive of their manners, customs, habits, and religious opinions made during a twelve years' residence in their immediate society. London: Humphrey Milford / Oxford University Press.
- Tod, James (1920) [1829], Crooke, William (ed.), Annals and Antiquities of Rajast'han or the Central and Western Rajpoot States of India, Volume 1, London: Humphrey Milford / Oxford University Press
- Tod, James (1920) [1829]. Crooke, William (ed.). Annals and Antiquities of Rajast'han or the Central and Western Rajpoot States of India, Volume 2. London: Humphrey Milford / Oxford University Press.
- Tod, James (1920) [1829]. Crooke, William (ed.). Annals and Antiquities of Rajast'han or the Central and Western Rajpoot States of India, Volume 3. London: Humphrey Milford / Oxford University Press.
- Sharīf, Jaʿfar (1921) [Original ed. 1832]. Crooke, William (ed.). Qānūn-i Islām قانونِ اسلام [The Customs of the Moosulmans of India; Comprising a Full and Exact Account of Their Various Rites and Ceremonies, from the Moment of Birth Till the Hour of Death] (in Urdu). Translated by Herklots, Gerhard Andreas (Revised ed.).
- Tavernier, Jean Baptiste (1925) [1676]. Crooke, William (ed.). Travels in India. trans. Valentine Ball, 1889. Oxford University Press / H. Milford.

== Books — other ==
- Crooke, William; Rouse, William Henry Denham (1902). The Talking Thrush and Other Tales from India. London: J. M. Dent & Co. - tales collected by Crooke, retold by Rouse
- Grierson, George Abraham; Stein, Aurel; Kaula, Govinda; Crooke, William (1923). Hatim's tales; Kashmiri stories and songs recorded with the assistance of Pandit Govind Kaul. Indian texts series. London: J. Murray.
- Hastings, James, ed. (1908). "Authors of Articles". Encyclopaedia of Religion and Ethics. Vol. 13: Index Volume. New York: Charles Scribner's Sons. p. 720.

== Journals — articles ==
- Crooke, William (1881). "Notes on Indian Folk-Lore". Folk-Lore Record. 4. London: Folklore Society: 133–137. doi:10.1080/17441994.1881.10602609.
- Crooke, William (November 1892). "Folktales from Hindustan — No. 3: How Eve rescued the Prince". Indian Antiquary. XXI (CCLXVI). Bombay: Education Society's Press: 341–343.
- Crooke, William (March 1894). "Folktales from Hindustan — No. 9: How the Bhuiya Boy became a Raja". Indian Antiquary. XXIII (CCLXXXIV). Bombay: Education Society's Press: 78–81.
- Crooke, William (March 1894). "Folktales from Hindustan — No. 10: The Story of Prince Danda and the Princess". Indian Antiquary. XXIII (CCLXXXIV). Bombay: Education Society's Press: 81.
- Crooke, William (December 1897). "The Binding of a God: A Study of the Basis of Idolatry". Folk-lore. XIII (4). London: Folklore Society: 325–355. doi:10.1080/0015587x.1897.9720428.
- Godden, Gertrude M. (23 February 1897). "Naga and Other Frontier Tribes of North-East India". Journal of the Anthropological Institute of Great Britain and Ireland. XXVII. Crooke, William. London: Anthropological Institute: 48–49. doi:10.2307/2842847. JSTOR 2842847.
- Robertson, Sir George Scott (13 April 1897). "Kafiristan and its People". Journal of the Anthropological Institute of Great Britain and Ireland. XXVII. Crooke, William. London: Anthropological Institute: 86. doi:10.2307/2842852. JSTOR 2842852.
- Crooke, William (June 1898). "The Wooing of Penelope". Folk-lore. IX. London: Folklore Society: 97–133.
- Holdich, Thos. H. (14 February 1899). "The Arab Tribes of our Indian Frontier". Journal of the Anthropological Institute of Great Britain and Ireland. XXIX (1/2). Crooke, William. London: Anthropological Institute: 20. doi:10.2307/2842570. JSTOR 2842570.
- Bennett, A. L. (9 May 1899). "Ethnographical Notes on the Fang". Journal of the Anthropological Institute of Great Britain and Ireland. XXIX (1/2). Crooke, William. London: Anthropological Institute: 97. doi:10.2307/2842579. JSTOR 2842579.
- Crooke, William (1899). "The Maternal Uncle in North Indian Marriage". Indian Antiquary. XXVIII. Bombay: Education Society's Press: 162.
- Crooke, William (March 1900). "The Legends of Krishna". Folk-lore. XI. London: Folklore Society: 1–38. doi:10.1080/0015587x.1900.9720517.
- Venkatasvami, M. N.; Crooke, William (March 1902). "Puli Raja or the Tiger Prince". Folk-lore. XIII. London: Folklore Society: 79–83. doi:10.1080/0015587x.1902.9719667.
- Crooke, William (June 1902). "Some Notes from North-Western India". Folk-lore. XIII (2). London: Folklore Society: 188–190. doi:10.1080/0015587x.1902.9719680.
- Crooke, William (September 1902). "The Lifting of the Bride". Folk-lore. XIII (3). London: Folklore Society: 226–251. doi:10.1080/0015587x.1902.9719307.
- Crooke, William (September 1902). "An Indian Ghost Story". Folk-lore. XIII (3). London: Folklore Society: 280–283. doi:10.1080/0015587x.1902.9719313.
- Crooke, William; Knox, K. N. (December 1903). "Witchcraft in Northern India". Folk-lore. XIV (4). London: Folklore Society: 407–408. doi:10.1080/0015587x.1903.9719375.
- Crooke, William (September 1904). "The Petting Stone". Folk-lore. XV. London: Folklore Society: 351.
- Crooke, William (June 1905). "The Rude Stone Monuments of India". Proceedings of the Cotteswold Naturalists' Field Club. XV (2): 117–145.
- Crooke, William (March 1906). "Betrothing Custom". Folk-lore. XVII. London: Folklore Society: 114.
- Crooke, William (June 1908). "Some Notes on Homeric Folk-Lore". Folk-lore. XIX. London: Folklore Society.
- Crooke, William (June 1909). "Some Notes on Indian Folklore". Folk-lore. XX (2). London: Folklore Society: 211–213. doi:10.1080/0015587x.1909.9719877.
- Crooke, William (December 1909). "Indian Folklore Notes, II". Folk-lore. XX (4). London: Folklore Society: 482–485. doi:10.1080/0015587x.1909.9719903.
- Crooke, William (1911). "Presidential Address: The importance of anthropological investigation". Proceedings of the Cotteswold Naturalists' Field Club. XVII (2): xiii, 141–156.
- Crooke, William (June 1911). "King Midas and his Ass's Ears". Folk-lore. XXII (2). London: Folklore Society: 183–202. doi:10.1080/0015587x.1911.9719473.
- Crooke, William (June 1911). "Indian Folklore Notes, III". Folk-lore. XXII (2). London: Folklore Society: 229–231. doi:10.1080/0015587x.1911.9719477.
- Crooke, William (March 1911). "Presidential Address: The Essential Unity of Folklore". Folk-lore. XXII. London: Folklore Society: 14–40.
- Crooke, William (1911). "A Note on the Meaning of "Meriah"". Man. XI. London: Royal Anthropological Institute: Art. 27. doi:10.2307/2840466. JSTOR 2840466.
- Crooke, William (1911). "A Note on the Derivation of Miri". Man. XI. London: Royal Anthropological Institute: Art. 56. doi:10.2307/2840742. JSTOR 2840742.
- Crooke, William (1911). "The Reverence for the Cow in India". Man. XI. London: Royal Anthropological Institute: Art. 95.
- Crooke, William (September 1912). "The Veneration of the Cow in India". Folk-lore. XXIII (3). London: Folklore Society: 275–306. doi:10.1080/0015587x.1912.9719531.
- Crooke, William (1912). "The Study of Customs connected with the Calendar in Scotland". Man. XII. London: Royal Anthropological Institute: Art. 91.
- Crooke, William (March 1913). "Presidential Address: Method of Investigation and Folklore Origins". Folk-lore. XXIV. London: Folklore Society: 14–40. doi:10.1080/0015587x.1913.9719547.
- Crooke, William (1913). "Indian Folklore Notes, IV". Folk-lore. XXIV (2). London: Folklore Society: 228–232. doi:10.1080/0015587x.1913.9719564.
- Crooke, William (March 1914). "The Holi: a Vernal Festival of the Hindus". Folk-lore. XXV. London: Folklore Society: 55–83. doi:10.1080/0015587x.1914.9718804.
- Crooke, William (March 1915). "The Dasahra: an Autumn Festival of the Hindus". Folk-lore. XXVI. London: Folklore Society: 28–59. doi:10.1080/0015587x.1915.9719701.
- Crooke, William (June 1917). "Bull-baiting, Bull-racing, Bull-fights". Folk-lore. XXVIII (2). London: Folklore Society: 141–163. doi:10.1080/0015587x.1917.9718974.
- Crooke, William (June 1917). "Obituary: Dr H. B. Wheatley". Folk-lore. XXVIII (2). London: Folklore Society: 222. doi:10.1080/0015587x.1917.9718979.
- Crooke, William (June 1918). "The House in India from the Point of View of Sociology and Folklore". Folk-lore. XXIX (2). London: Folklore Society: 113–145. doi:10.1080/0015587x.1918.9719044.
- Crooke, William (September 1918). "'Prentice Pillars: The Architect and his Pupil". Folk-lore. XXIX (3). London: Folklore Society: 219–225. doi:10.1080/0015587x.1918.9719059.
- Crooke, William (December 1919). "The Cults of the Mother Goddesses in India". Folk-lore. XXX (4). London: Folklore Society: 282–308. doi:10.1080/0015587x.1919.9719110.
- Crooke, William (March 1920). "Obituary: Dr. Vincent Arthur Smith". Folk-lore. XXXI. London: Folklore Society: 87. doi:10.1080/0015587x.1920.9719131.
- Crooke, William (March 1922). "Obituary: Mansel Longworth Dames". Folk-lore. XXXIII. London: Folklore Society: 131–132. doi:10.1080/0015587x.1922.9719234.
- Crooke, William (December 1923). "The Dīvālī, the Lamp Festival of the Hindus". Folk-lore. XXXIV (4). London: Folklore Society: 267–292. doi:10.1080/0015587x.1923.9719262. JSTOR 1256550.

== Journals — reviews ==
- Crooke, William (September 1899). "Review: R. Browm's Semitic Influences in Hellenic Mythology and Researches into the Origin of the Primitive Constellations of the Greeks, Phoenicians and Babylonians". Folk-lore. X. London: Folklore Society: 339–341.
- Crooke, William (1899). "Review: A. H. Keane, Ethnology and Man, Past and Present". Journal of the Anthropological Institute of Great Britain and Ireland. XXIX. London: Anthropological Institute: 184–185. doi:10.2307/2842592. JSTOR 2842592.
- Crooke, William (1899). "Review: The Kingdom of the Barotsi, Upper Zambesia". Journal of the Anthropological Institute of Great Britain and Ireland. XXIX. London: Anthropological Institute: 188. doi:10.2307/2842596. JSTOR 2842596.
- Crooke, William (March 1900). "Review: Henry Balfour's The Natural History of the Musical Bow". Folk-lore. XI. London: Folklore Society: 97–98.
- Crooke, William (March 1900). "Review: Rev. A. Manwaring's Marathi Proverbs". Folk-lore. XI. London: Folklore Society: 98–99.
- Crooke, William (March 1900). "Review: Rev. T. K. Cheyne and J. Sutherland Black's Encyclopedia Biblica, Volume I". Folk-lore. XI. London: Folklore Society: 99–101.
- Crooke, William (March 1900). "Review: T. W. Rhys Davids' Dialogue of the Buddha". Folk-lore. XI. London: Folklore Society: 403–406.
- Crooke, William (September 1901). "Review: S. P. Rice's Occasional Essays on Native South Indian Life". Folk-lore. XII. London: Folklore Society: 245–247.
- Crooke, William (September 1901). "Review: Rev. T. K. Cheyne and J. Sutherland Black's Encyclopedia Biblica, Volume 2". Folk-lore. XII. London: Folklore Society: 247–248.
- Crooke, William (1901). "Review: R. C. Hamilton, An Outline Grammar of the Dafla Language as Spoken by the Tribes of the Apa Tanung Country". Man. I. London: Royal Anthropological Institute: Art. 46.
- Crooke, William (March 1902). "Review: Alfred C. Haddon's Head-Hunters, Black, White, and Brown". Folk-lore. XIII. London: Folklore Society: 101–103.
- Crooke, William (June 1902). "Review: Rev. T. K. Cheyne and J. Sutherland Black's Encyclopedia Biblica, Volume 3 and A. Keane's The Gold of Ophir, Whence brought, and by Whom". Folk-lore. XIII. London: Folklore Society: 218–219.
- Crooke, William (December 1902). "Review: M. A. Potter's Sohrab and Rustem". Folk-lore. XIII. London: Folklore Society: 444–447.
- Crooke, William (1902). "Review: J. F. Hewitt, History and Chronology of the Myth-making Age". Man. II. London: Royal Anthropological Institute: Art. 93.
- Crooke, William (1902). "Review: C. Hayavadana Rao, Some Questions of South Indian Ethnology". Man. II. London: Royal Anthropological Institute: Art. 106.
- Crooke, William (March 1903). "Review: H. A. Rose's Popular Religion in the Punjab". Folk-lore. XIV. London: Folklore Society: 100–104.
- Crooke, William (June 1903). "Review: F. Starr's Physical Characters of the Indians of Southern Mexico and Notes upon the Ethnography of Southern Mexico". Folk-lore. XIV. London: Folklore Society: 202–204.
- Crooke, William (September 1903). "Review: Rev. T. K. Cheyne and J. Sutherland Black's Encyclopedia Biblica, Volume 4". Folk-lore. XIV. London: Folklore Society: 315–316.
- Crooke, William (1903). "Review: M. C. Bougle, Remarques sur les Regime des Castes". Man. III. London: Royal Anthropological Institute: Art. 33.
- Crooke, William (1903). "Review: D. B. Macdonald, The Development of Muslim Theology, Jurisprudence and Constitutional Theory". Man. III. London: Royal Anthropological Institute: Art. 110.
- Crooke, William (June 1904). "Review: H. H. Risley and E. A. Gait's Census of India, 1901". Folk-lore. XV. London: Folklore Society: 222–224. doi:10.1080/0015587X.1904.9719407.
- Crooke, William (September 1904). "Review: T. H. Weir's The Shaikhs of Morocco in the Sixteenth Century". Folk-lore. XV. London: Folklore Society: 367–368.
- Crooke, William (September 1904). "Review: Ganeshji Jethabhai's Indian Folklore". Folk-lore. XV. London: Folklore Society: 368.
- Crooke, William (1904). "Review: M. Longworth Dames, The Baloch Race: A Historical and Ethnological Sketch". Man. IV. London: Royal Anthropological Institute: Art. 75.
- Crooke, William (1905). "Review: C. F. Oldham, The Sun and the Serpent: a Contribution to the History of Serpent-Worship". Man. V. London: Royal Anthropological Institute: Art. 56.
- Crooke, William (1905). "Review: L. Augustine Waddell, Lhasa and its Mysteries, with a Record of the Expedition of 1903-1904". Man. V. London: Royal Anthropological Institute: Art. 63.
- Crooke, William (March 1906). "Review: W. A. Reed's The Negritos of Zambales". Folk-lore. XVII. London: Folklore Society: 120–122.
- Crooke, William (December 1906). "Review: H. T. Francis's The Jataka, Volume V". Folk-lore. XVII. London: Folklore Society: 498–501.
- Crooke, William (December 1906). "Review: A. E. Dracott's Simla Village, or Folk Tales from the Himalayas". Folk-lore. XVII. London: Folklore Society: 501–503.
- Crooke, William (December 1906). "Review: J. A. M. M'Culloch's The Childhood of Fiction". Folk-lore. XVII. London: Folklore Society: 503–505.
- Crooke, William (March 1907). "Review: W. H. R. Rivers, The Todas". Folk-lore. XVIII. London: Folklore Society: 102–105.
- Crooke, William (March 1907). "Review: E. C. Quiggin, A Dialect of Donegal". Folk-lore. XVIII. London: Folklore Society: 120.
- Crooke, William (June 1907). "Review: P. R. T. Gurdon, The Khasis". Folk-lore. XVIII. London: Folklore Society: 240–243.
- Crooke, William (September 1907). "Review: T. F. Thiselton-Dyer, Folklore of Women". Folk-lore. XVIII. London: Folklore Society: 350–351.
- Crooke, William (December 1907). "Review: Walter W. Skeat and C. O. Blagden, Pagan Races of the Malay Peninsula". Folk-lore. XVIII. London: Folklore Society: 451–456. doi:10.1080/0015587X.1907.9719803.
- Crooke, William (1907). "Review: W. F. O'Connor, Folk-Tales from Tibet". Man. VII. London: Royal Anthropological Institute: Art. 20.
- Crooke, William (1907). "Review: L. D. Barnett, Religions Ancient and Modern: Hinduism, and Ameer Ali, Islam". Man. VII. London: Royal Anthropological Institute: Art. 50.
- Crooke, William (1907). "Review: M. Longworth Dames, Popular Poetry of the Baloches". Man. VII. London: Royal Anthropological Institute: Art. 79.
- Crooke, William (1908). "Review: H. A. Rose, Compendium of the Punjab Customary Law". Man. VIII. London: Royal Anthropological Institute: Art. 59.
- Crooke, William (March 1909). "Review: W. Johnson, Folk Memory". Folk-lore. XX. London: Folklore Society: 101–102.
- Crooke, William (March 1909). "Review: Arthur J. Evans, etc., Anthropology and the Classics". Folk-lore. XX. London: Folklore Society: 103–104.
- Crooke, William (June 1909). "Review: J. G. Frazer, Psyche's Task". Folk-lore. XX. London: Folklore Society: 241–242.
- Crooke, William (June 1909). "Review: A. Lang, The Origin of Terms of Human Relationship". Folk-lore. XX. London: Folklore Society: 255–256.
- Crooke, William (September 1909). "Review: Gunnar Landtman, The Primary Causes of Social Inequality". Folk-lore. XX. London: Folklore Society: 369–371.
- Crooke, William (1909). "Review: H. Ling Roth, Trading in Early Days". Man. IX. London: Royal Anthropological Institute: Art. 37.
- Crooke, William (March 1910). "Review: Cecil Henry Bompas, Folklore of the Santal Parganas". Folk-lore. XXI. London: Folklore Society: 124–126.
- Crooke, William (June 1910). "Review: A. Playfair, The Garos". Folk-lore. XXI. London: Folklore Society: 261–263.
- Crooke, William (September 1910). "Review: Max Arthur Macauliffe, The Sikh Religion". Folk-lore. XXI. London: Folklore Society: 414–416.
- Crooke, William (1910). "Review: B. L. Rice, Mysore and Coorg from the Inscriptions". Man. X. London: Royal Anthropological Institute: Art. 22.
- Crooke, William (1910). "Review: Malik Muhammad Din, The Bahawalpur State Gazetteer". Man. X. London: Royal Anthropological Institute: Art. 26.
- Crooke, William (1910). "Review: L. K. Anantha Krishna Iyer, The Cochin Tribes and Castes, Volume I". Man. X. London: Royal Anthropological Institute: Art. 105.
- Crooke, William (March 1911). "Review: W. I. Thomas, Source Book for Social Origins". Folk-lore. XXII. London: Folklore Society: 108–109.
- Crooke, William (March 1911). "Review: H. Parker, Village Folk Tales of Ceylon, Volume I". Folk-lore. XXII. London: Folklore Society: 123–125.
- Crooke, William (March 1911). "Review: A. Ker, Papuan Fairy Tales". Folk-lore. XXII. London: Folklore Society: 125–126.
- Crooke, William (June 1911). "Review: T. C. Hodson, The Naga Tribes of Manipur". Folk-lore. XXII. London: Folklore Society: 266–268.
- Crooke, William (December 1911). "Review: A. Mosso, The Dawn of Mediterranean Civilisation". Folk-lore. XXII. London: Folklore Society: 510–511.
- Crooke, William (December 1911). "Review: S. Endle, The Kacharis". Folk-lore. XXII. London: Folklore Society: 520–522.
- Crooke, William (December 1911). "Review: C. G. and B. Z. Seligmann, The Veddas". Folk-lore. XXII. London: Folklore Society: 522–523.
- Crooke, William (1911). "Review: Sir Andrew H. L. Fraser, Among Indian Rajahs and Ryots". Man. XI. London: Royal Anthropological Institute: Art. 82.
- Crooke, William (1911). "Review: T. C. Hodson, The Nagas of Manipur". Man. XI. London: Royal Anthropological Institute: Art. 87.
- Crooke, William (March 1912). "Review: W. J. Sollas, Ancient Hunters and their Modern Representatives; R. R. Marett, Anthropology; W. L. H. Duckworth, Prehistoric Man". Folk-lore. XXIII. London: Folklore Society: 121–122.
- Crooke, William (June 1912). "Review: H. A. Rose, A Glossary of the Tribes and Castes of the Punjab and North-West Frontier Province". Folk-lore. XXIII. London: Folklore Society: 261–263.
- Crooke, William (September 1912). "Review: Jane Ellen Harrison, Themis". Folk-lore. XXIII. London: Folklore Society: 394–396.
- Crooke, William (1912). "Review: Gilbert Murray, Rise of the Greek Epic". Man. XII. London: Royal Anthropological Institute: Art. 78. doi:10.2307/2788276. JSTOR 2788276.
- Crooke, William (1912). "Review: Sridhar V. Ketkar, The History of Caste in India, Volumes I & II". Man. XII. London: Royal Anthropological Institute: Art. 111.
- Crooke, William (March 1913). "Review: James H. Leuba, A Psychological Study of Religion". Folk-lore. XXIV. London: Folklore Society: 124–126. doi:10.1080/0015587X.1913.9719556.
- Crooke, William (March 1913). "Review: L. K. Anantha Krishna Iyer, The Cochin Tribes and Castes, Vol. II". Folk-lore. XXIV. London: Folklore Society: 147–149.
- Crooke, William (1913). "Review: Malta and the Mediterranean Race. By R. N. Bradley". Folk-lore. XXIV. London: Folklore Society: 263–264.
- Crooke, William (1913). "Review: The Census of Northern India. Reports". Folk-lore. XXIV. London: Folklore Society: 270–273.
- Crooke, William (December 1913). "Review: Athelstane Baines, Ethnography (Tribes and Castes); P. T. Srinivas Iyengar, Life in Ancient India in the Age of the Mantras; A. Avalon, Tantra of the Great Liberation; A. and E. Avalon, Hymn to the Goddess; R. L. Lacey, The Holy Land of the Hindus". Folk-lore. XXIV. London: Folklore Society: 533–536.
- Crooke, William (1913). "Review: Edgar Thurston, Omens and Superstitions of Southern India". Man. XIII. London: Royal Anthropological Institute: Art. 34. doi:10.2307/2788109. JSTOR 2788109.
- Crooke, William (September 1914). "Review: Haughton, H. L., Sport and Folklore in the Himalaya". Folk-lore. XXV. London: Folklore Society: 393–394.
- Crooke, William (September 1914). "Review: N. W. Thomas, Anthropological Report on the Ibo-speaking Peoples of the Awka Neighbourhood". Folk-lore. XXV. London: Folklore Society: 404–406.
- Crooke, William (September 1914). "Review: J. G. Frazer, Psyche's Task: A Discourse concerning the Influence of Superstition on the growth of Institutions". Folk-lore. XXV. London: Folklore Society: 406–407.
- Crooke, William (June 1915). "Review: Arthur Bernard Cook: Zeus, a Study of Ancient Religion;Gladys M. N. Davis, The Asiatic Dionysos". Folk-lore. XXVI. London: Folklore Society: 221–223.
- Crooke, William (December 1915). "Review: R. E. Enthoven, Folklore Notes; Mrs John Roberts, Khasi Folklore; Thakur Rajendra Singh, Legends of Vikramaditya". Folk-lore. XXVI. London: Folklore Society: 424–426.
- Crooke, William (December 1916). "Review: A. C. Parker, The Code of Handsome Lake, the Seneca Prophet". Folk-lore. XXVII. London: Folklore Society: 442–444.
- Crooke, William (December 1916). "Review: Hutton Webster, Rest Days: A Study in Early Law and Morality". Folk-lore. XXVII. London: Folklore Society: 445–446.
- Crooke, William (January 1917). "Review: Sir Mark Sykes, The Caliph's Last Heritage". Man. XVII. London: Royal Anthropological Institute: Art. 14.
- Crooke, William (March 1917). "Review: Lewis Spence, Myths and Legends of Ancient Egypt". Man. XVII. London: Royal Anthropological Institute: Art. 38.
- Crooke, William (March 1917). "Review: A. Sutherland Rattray, Folklore from West Africa: Ashanti Proverbs; J. M. Dalziel, A Hausa Botanical Glossary". Folk-lore. XXVIII. London: Folklore Society: 108–111. doi:10.1080/0015587X.1917.9718969.
- Crooke, William (August 1917). "Review: Ramaprasad Chanda, Aryan Races: A Study of the Origin of Indo-Aryan People and Institutions, Part I". Man. XVII. London: Royal Anthropological Institute: Art. 91.
- Crooke, William (December 1917). "Review: Lucy M. J. Garnett, Folk-Beliefs in the Balkan Peninsula: Balkan Home-Life". Folk-lore. XXVIII. London: Folklore Society: 454–455. doi:10.1080/0015587X.1917.9719019.
- Crooke, William (1918). "Review: Henry Cousens, Bijapur and its Architectural Remains, and A. H. Longhurst, Hampi Ruins Described and Illustrated". Man. XVIII. London: Royal Anthropological Institute: Art. 35.
- Crooke, William (December 1918). "Review: T. R. St. Johnston, The Lan Islands (Fiji), and their Fairy Tales and Folklore". Folk-lore. XXIX. London: Folklore Society: 324–325. doi:10.1080/0015587X.1918.9719072.
- Crooke, William (September 1919). "Review: Duarte Barbosa, The Book of Duarte Barbosa; Hamd. Allah Mustawfi of Qaswin, The Geographical Part of the Nuzhat-al-Qulub; Vincent A. Smith, The Oxford History of India, from the Earliest Times to the end of 1911; F. J. Richards, Madras District Gazetteer; Joseph Davey Cunningham, A History of the Sikhs, from the Origin of the Nation to the Battles of Sutlej". Folk-lore. XXX. London: Folklore Society: 242–247. doi:10.1080/0015587X.1919.9719106.
- Crooke, William (June 1920). "Review: D. L. R. Lorimer and E. O. Lorimer, Persian Folk Tales". Folk-lore. XXXI. London: Folklore Society: 156–157. doi:10.1080/0015587X.1920.9719146.
- Crooke, William (June 1920). "Review: M. Bloomfield, Traditions of the Jains". Folk-lore. XXXI. London: Folklore Society: 158–159.
- Crooke, William (June 1920). "Review: Rai Bahadur, Hindu Holidays and Ceremonials, with Dissertations on Origin, Folklore and Symbols". Folk-lore. XXXI. London: Folklore Society: 168–169.
- Crooke, William (March 1921). "Review: Edwin W. Smith and A. Murray Dale, The Ba-ila Speaking Peoples of Northern Rhodesia". Folk-lore. XXXII. London: Folklore Society: 67–68.
- Crooke, William (March 1921). "Review: Eleanour Sinclair Rohde, A Garden of Herbs". Folk-lore. XXXII. London: Folklore Society: 69.
- Crooke, William (June 1921). "Review: Rai Sahib Dineshchandra Sen., Folklore in Bengal. The Bengali Ramayanas and The Folk-Literature of Bengal". Folk-lore. XXXII. London: Folklore Society: 137–138.
- Crooke, William (December 1921). "Review: J. H. Hutton, The Angami Nagas, with some Notes on Neighbouring Tribes ". Folk-lore. XXXII. London: Folklore Society: 280–282.
- Crooke, William (March 1922). "Review: Lewis Richard Farnell, Greek Hero Cults and Ideas of Immortality". Folk-lore. XXXIII. London: Folklore Society: 125–126. doi:10.1080/0015587X.1922.9719232.
- Crooke, William (September 1922). "Review: E. Westermarck, The History of Human Marriage". Folk-lore. XXXIII. London: Folklore Society: 322–325. doi:10.1080/0015587X.1922.9720564.
- Crooke, William (September 1922). "Review: J. S. Udal, Dorsetshire Folk-Lore". Folk-lore. XXXIII. London: Folklore Society: 325–326.
- Crooke, William (September 1922). "Review: R. E. Enthoven, The Tribes and Castes of Bombay". Folk-lore. XXXIII. London: Folklore Society: 328–329.
