= İnegöl meatballs =

Turkish köfte variety from İnegöl, Bursa

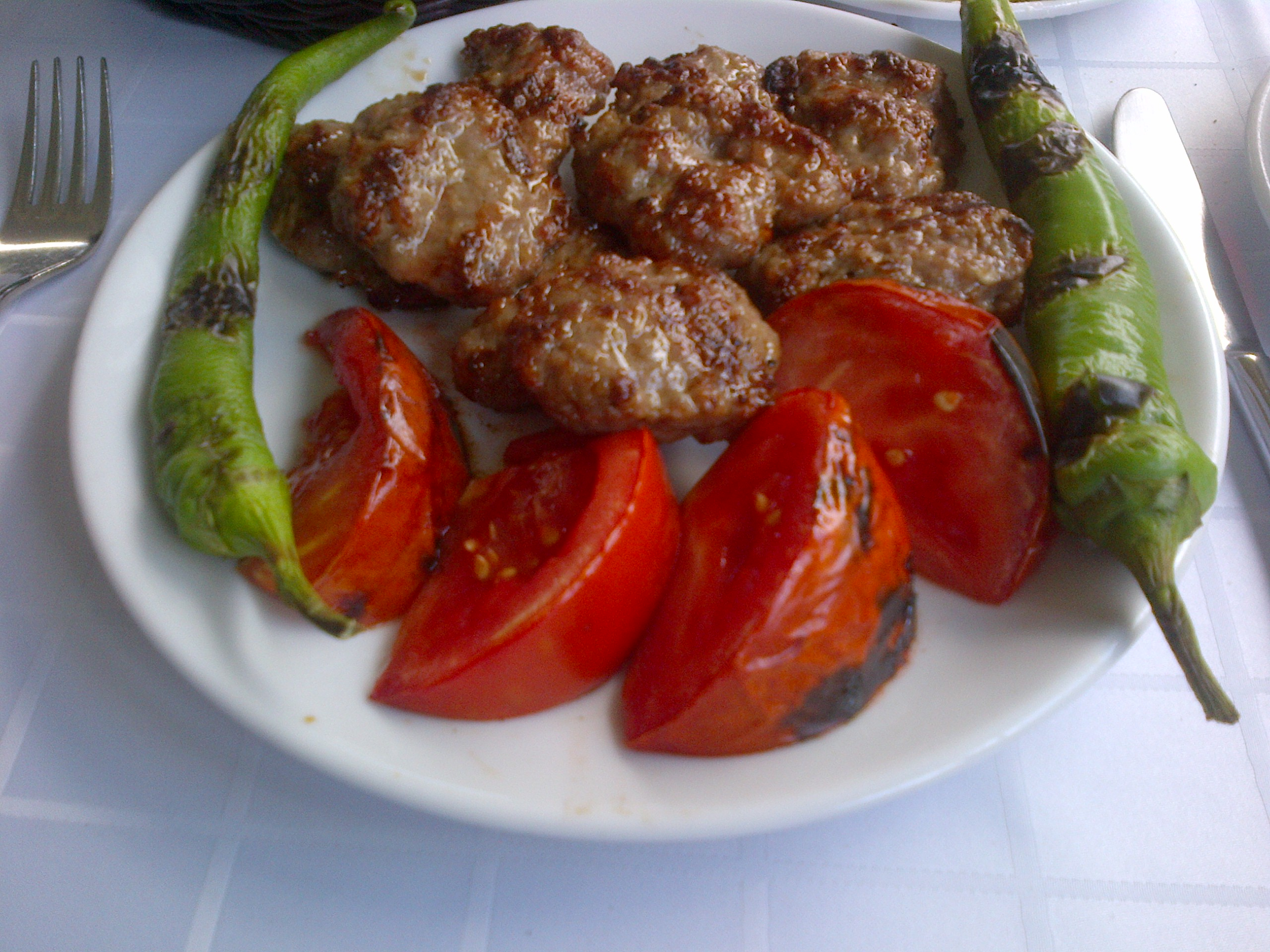
- Course: Main course
- Place of origin: Turkey
- Region or state: İnegöl, Bursa
- Main ingredients: Meat (lamb or beef), breadcrumbs, onion

İnegöl köfte are grilled meatballs (köfte) specific to İnegöl, Bursa, Turkey.

== History ==
The dish was invented by one Mustafa Efendi, who was born in 1842 in Pazarcık, Ottoman Bulgaria, and emigrated to İnegöl in 1892. In 1893, he began selling meatballs in his shop at the bazaar on the Ankara-Bursa road. These proved popular and the family-run shop is still in business till the present day.

== Preparation ==
Kneaded in a round shape, the meatballs are usually cooked on a grill. The fame of İnegöl meatballs has spread throughout Turkey. Production of İnegöl meatballs started in the 1930s and quickly spread all over the country. The most important feature of Inegol meatballs is that no seasoning is used other than salt. Each meatball is between 12 and 15 grams and round, though some places make them flat as well. İnegöl meatballs can consist of veal, lamb, salt, sodium-bicarbonate and onion mixture in specific proportions. Prepared meatballs are refrigerated for 2–3 hours, then they are ready to be cooked.

== See also ==
- Akçaabat meatballs
- Islama köfte
- Ćevapi
- List of meatball dishes
