= Simon Necronomicon =

Modern spellbook and occult text

- Author: Peter Levenda
- Language: English
- Publisher: Avon Books
- Publication date: 1977–1980
- Publication place: United States
- Media type: Print
- Pages: 288
- ISBN: 978-0380751921

The Simon Necronomicon is a grimoire attributed to "Simon", allegedly a pseudonym of writer Peter Levenda. Materials presented in the book are a blend of ancient Middle Eastern elements, with allusions to the writings of H. P. Lovecraft and Aleister Crowley, woven together with a story about a man known as the "Mad Arab".

The book was released in 1977 by Schlangekraft, Inc. in a limited edition hardback printing, followed by a paperback release by Avon Books, and a subsequent paperback release by Bantam Books.

== Simon's introduction ==
The introduction to the book (comprising about 80 pages of a total of 263) is the only part that Simon claims to have written. It relates how Simon and his associates were introduced to a Greek translation of the Necronomicon by a mysterious monk. Simon claims that after experimenting with the text, they verified that the work is a genuine collection of magical rituals that predates most known religions, and warns that anyone attempting to use the Necronomicon may "unleash dangerous forces". The introduction attempts to establish links between H. P. Lovecraft, Aleister Crowley and ancient mythology (including Sumerian, Babylonian, Assyrian, and Chaldean myths and rituals), and draw parallels to other religions (such as Christianity, Wicca, Satanism and Hebrew Mythology). Some of the discussion is based on a supposed connection between Crowley and Lovecraft first espoused by Kenneth Grant.

== "The Testimony of the Mad Arab" ==
In addition to an introduction, the book uses a frame story titled "The Testimony of the Mad Arab". The "Testimony" is in two parts, forming a prologue and an epilogue to the core Necronomicon. The author describes himself as a "Mad Arab".

The prologue explains how the Arab first came to discover the dark secrets that he is recording, accidentally witnessing an arcane ritual performed by a cult that worships Tiamat, in which both the demons Kutulu and Humwawa are conjured.

In the epilogue, the Mad Arab is haunted by premonitions of his gruesome death. He realizes that the horrors of the Necronomicon are enraged and seek revenge upon him for revealing their existence to the world. The text is littered with non sequiturs and arcane incantations, presented as indication of his unstable mental state and his desire to protect himself from perceived danger. He is unable to sign his work, and thus remains nameless.

== Magic ==
Much of the book is a collection of magic rituals and conjurations. Many incantations and seals are described. Most of these are intended to ward off evil or to invoke the Elder Gods to one's aid. Some of them are curses to be used against one's enemies. The incantations are written in a mixture of English and more ancient languages, with a few possible misspellings in the romanization of the archaic words. There are also several words that do not appear to be from any known language.

The many magical seals in the book pertain to particular gods and demons, and are used when invoking or summoning the entity with which each is associated. In some cases there are specific instructions on how to inscribe the seals and amulets, including the materials that should be used and the time of day for their creation; in other cases, only the seal itself is given.

For some rituals, the book mentions that sacrifices should be offered. One ritual in particular describes a human sacrifice of 11 men, needed to enchant a knife that can summon Tiamat (pp. 160–161).

Both the introduction and the book's marketing make sensational claims for the book's magical power. The back blurb claims it is "the most potent and potentially, the most dangerous Black Book known to the Western World," and that its rituals will bring "beings and monsters" into "physical appearance". The book's introduction gives readers frequent warnings that the powers it contains are potentially life-threatening, and that perfect mental health is needed; otherwise the book is extremely dangerous. It claims a curse afflicted those who helped publish the book. It also claims that the Golden Dawn methods of magical banishing will not work on the entities in this book.

== Textual authenticity ==
According to one book on the topic, The Necronomicon Files, several portions of the Necronomicon bear striking similarities to other works mentioned in its bibliography, such as R. C. Thompson's The Devils and Evil Spirits of Babylonia and James B. Pritchard's Ancient Near Eastern Texts Relating to the Old Testament — to an extent that it appears unlikely that separate translations could have arrived at the same result. In addition, two members of the Magickal Childe scene, Khem Caigan (the Necronomicon's illustrator) and Alan Cabal, an American occultist, have independently stated that the book was widely known as a hoax in the local occult community and references Peter Levenda as the author.

Owen Davies calls Simon Necronomicon "a well-constructed hoax", but adds that making a grimoire by stitching together material from previous sources is a well-worn motif in grimoire history, and that "it is their falsity that makes them genuine." The same thing is pointed out by Dan Clore who writes that the hoax Necronomicons are every bit as "authentic" as the Lesser Key of Solomon or the Sixth and Seventh Books of Moses.

== Accusations of black magic and connections to murder ==
The book was featured as courtroom evidence in the murder trial of Rod Ferrell, with suggestions that it played a part in Satanic human sacrifices. Ferrell, it is claimed, used the book during cult rituals.

== Dead Names ==
In 2006, Avon published Simon's Dead Names: The Dark History of the Necronomicon (ISBN 0-06-078704-X), in which he details the history of the Necronomicon and attacks his critics who claim the book is a hoax. The book's conclusions are considered suspect by his critics.

== Related links ==
- Babylonian mythology
- Cthulhu Mythos
- Necronomicon
- Peter Levenda
- Sumerian religion
