= History of the Necronomicon =

1927 short story by H. P. Lovecraft

- Short story by H. P. Lovecraft
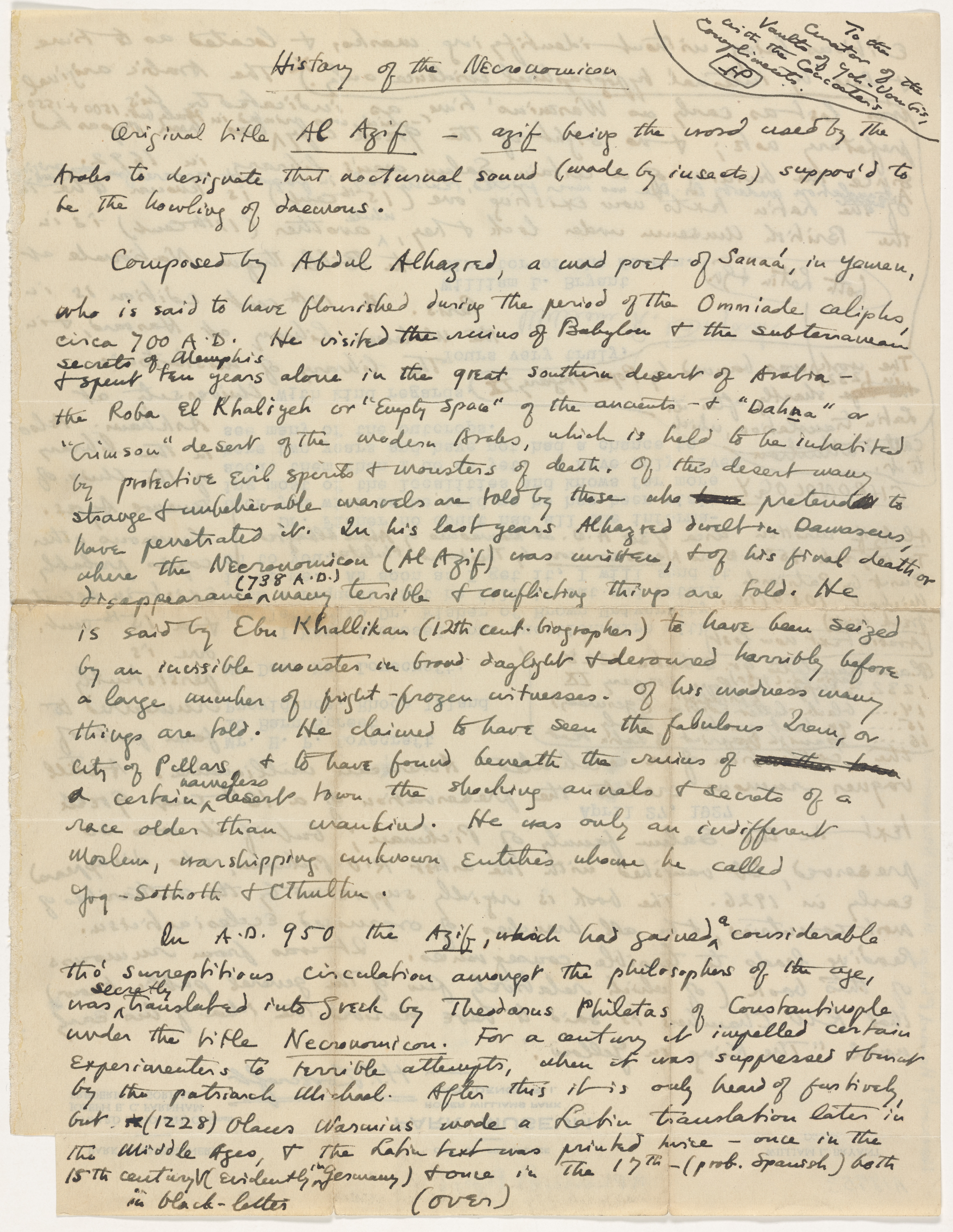
- First page of the manuscript of History of the Necronomicon.

Text available at Wikisource
- Country: United States
- Language: English
- Genre: Horror short story

Publication
- Publisher: The Rebel Press
- Media type: Short story
- Publication date: 1938

"History of the Necronomicon" is a short text written by H. P. Lovecraft in 1927, and published in 1938. It describes the origins of the fictional book of the same name: the occult grimoire Necronomicon, a now-famous element of some of his stories. The short text purports to be non-fiction, adding to the appearance of "pseudo-authenticity" which Lovecraft valued in building his Cthulhu Mythos oeuvre. Accordingly, it supposes the history of the Necronomicon as the inspiration for Robert W. Chambers' The King in Yellow, which concerns a book that overthrows the minds of those who read it.

== Text ==
The text tells how the Necronomicon was penned by the mad Arab Abdul Alhazred under the title Al-Azif. Alhazred died after being devoured by invisible demons in front of a terrified crowd. His work was subsequently suppressed, though survived. No original Arabic copies survive, nor any Greek translations. Only five Greek to Latin translations (retitled the Necronomicon) are held in libraries (British Museum, Bibliothèque nationale de France, University of Buenos Aires, Widener Library at Harvard University, and Miskatonic University), though private copies do exist.

Audio recording of the first paragraph of "History of the Necronomicon"

== Character name ==
Lovecraft created the name of the character Abdul Alhazred from a number of sources. As a child, Lovecraft was inspired by the novel One Thousand and One Nights and took an interest in Arabic culture. At the age of five, he developed the pseudonym "Abdul Alhazred" while playing, which was perhaps given to him by the family lawyer. It is speculated that the name could also be derived from an old family who lived in Providence at the same time as Lovecraft, the Hazards. The name could also be a pun as it phonetically sounds like "all-has-read" due to Lovecraft's love of reading.

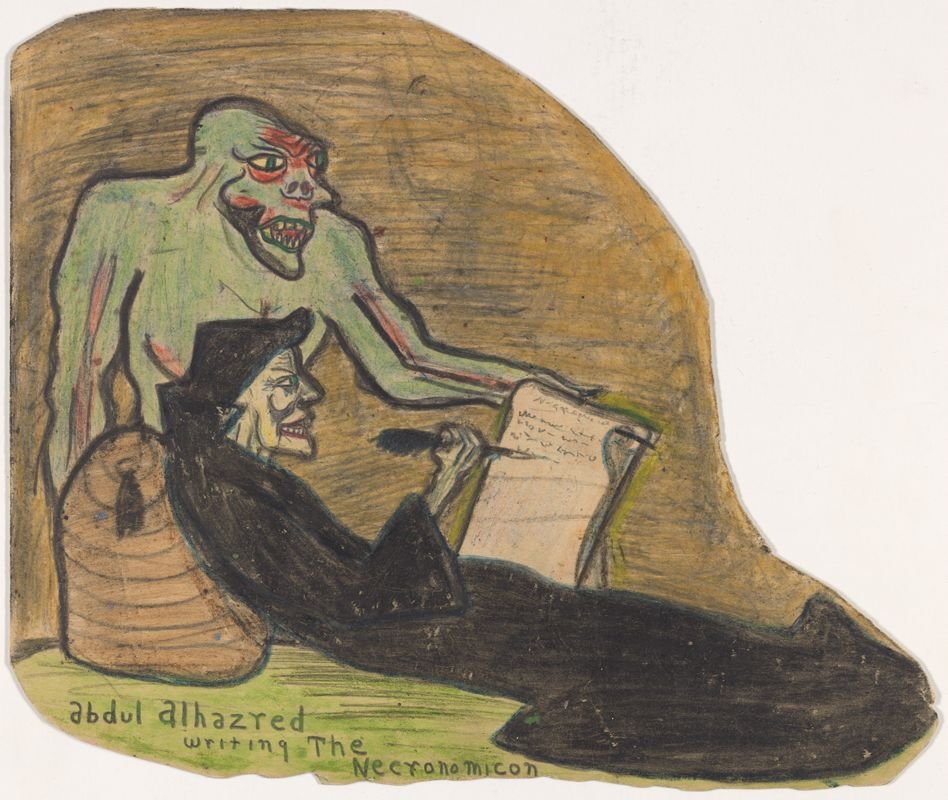
"Abdul Alhazred writing the Necronomicon" drawing by Robert Bloch, 1933

In the Arabic language, the name "Abdul Alhazred" is not grammatically correct. The suffix "-ul" and the prefix "al-" both refer to the article "the", essentially repeating it. In Arabic translations of "History of the Necronomicon", his name appears as "Abduallah Alhazred" or sometimes "Abd Al-Hazred". In the Cthulhu Mythos itself and when being referenced by scholars or other authors, the "Mad Arab" is always spelt using capitalization, suggesting that the "Mad Arab" is a proper noun and a title.

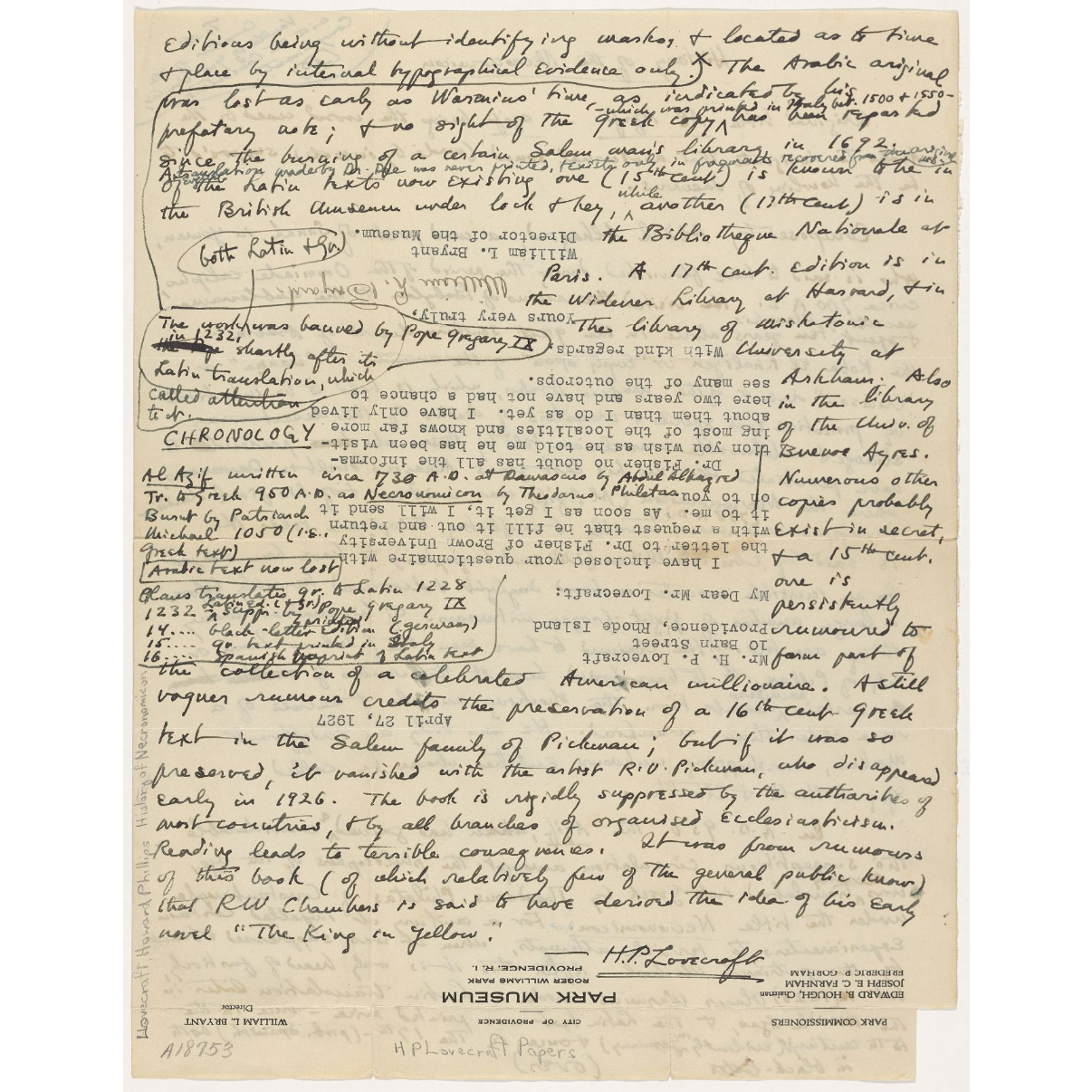
Second page of manuscript "History of the Necronomicon"

== Publication ==
"History of the Necronomicon" was posthumously published by the Rebel Press in 1938, a year after Lovecraft's death. Only 80 copies of the original edition were ever printed, but very few still exist today. No copies of the original edition are held in universities or libraries, not even the Brown University library, which has one of the largest collections of artifacts associated with Lovecraft. Most reprint versions of the short story were published by Necronomicon Press in the 1970s. "History of the Necronomicon" is one of the only Lovecraft stories to be rarely included in collected reprints and editions of his works.

Before publication, Lovecraft sent the fictional history he would write in "History of the Necronomicon" in a letter to fellow Weird Tales author and confidant Clark Ashton Smith. Lovecraft would write: "In particular I have drawn up some data on the celebrated & unmentionable Necronomicon of the mad Arab Abdul Alhazred... Once a man read through the copy in the library of Miskatonic University at Arkham—read it through & fled wild-eyed into the hills...but that is another story!".

== Pseudobiblia ==
Pseudobiblia is a type of storytelling device in which an imaginary narrative is presented as non-fiction, often using fictional citations or texts, sometimes referred to as a fictional book. Pseudobiblia can be used to establish verisimilitude, to add realism to a larger, connected story or to make connections to the real world. Lovecraft's use of pseudobiblia is very prevalent in History of the Necronomicon, which was written while Lovecraft was writing for the horror pulp fiction magazine, Weird Tales. Pseudobiblia was used extensively by the different writers for Weird Tales, who often engaged collaboratively in each other's works. The serialized nature of the medium prevented Lovecraft from crafting a new fictional setting, so pseudobiblia allowed him to world build within the restrictions of the pulp format. Additionally, there are examples in medieval Arabic literature of supernatural fiction stories being presented as non-fiction, a genre called "marvel tales", which Gonce described as "part travelog, part historical treatise, and part grimoire". One Thousand and One Nights is influenced by this genre of Arabic literature, which may also explain Lovecraft's propensity to use pseudobiblia in his works, according to Gonce.

Lovecraft would regularly cite genuine scholarly sources alongside fictitious ones of his own creation, such as "History of the Necronomicon". Lovecraft writes that the Necronomicon was suppressed and burned by Patriarch Michael I and Pope Gregory IX, who are both real, historical figures. However, it was named the Necronomicon and translated into Greek by scholar Theodorus Philetas, who is entirely fictional. Additionally, the novella At the Mountains of Madness is another Lovecraft text that employs pseudobiblia. The narrator of the story attempts to dissuade a group of explorers from venturing on a voyage to Antarctica and provides a detailed, alternative prehistory of the world that is foundational to the cosmology of the Cthulhu Mythos.

Lovecraft would reference and would be referenced by the other authors who wrote for Weird Tales in their own fictional stories, which Lovecraft would encourage as it creates "a background of evil verisimilitude", as he wrote in a letter. For example, fellow Weird Tales author Clark Ashton Smith's Book of Eibon draws heavy inspiration from Lovecraft's own Necronomicon, which Lovecraft himself celebrates as he thought it would be of the most "blackest and most appalling significance" for the readers who realized the connection between the two books.

John Engle argues that the pseudobiblia of "History of the Necronomicon" has resulted in people believing the story to be genuine, both casual readers and occultists who have included aspects of Lovecraft's works in their own occult practices despite Lovecraft himself scorning genuine occultists. For example, "History of the Necronomicon" states that John Dee translated the Necronomicon into English. Dee is a real historical mathematician and occultist who is still studied and revered by occultists today. Hoaxers have created fake Dee-translated Necronomicons that can be found online and are often presented as genuine occult texts or genuine first edition copies.

Lovecraft himself appeared to be conscious of this potential implication of his use of pseudobiblia, as he believed if the internal cosmology of his Cthulhu Mythos was to be realistic, he must construct it "with all the care and verisimilitude of an actual hoax". In 1936, a fake review of a new translation of the Necronomicon appeared in the Branford Review, a small-town newspaper in New York. Lovecraft said about this fake review, "If the Necronomicon legend continues to grow, people will end up by believing in it and accusing me of faking when I point out the true origin of the thing!" The original writer of this fake review is Donald Wollheim, an author and editor who was a fan of Lovecraft that began writing to him around the time his fake review of the Necronomicon was published. Wollheim would later publish a number of Lovecraft's works in his fanzine before his death. The Lovecraft scholar Kendrick Kerwin Chua argued that this false review inspired Lovecraft to write "History of the Necronomicon", which is untrue because it was written in 1927 but published posthumously.

== Criticism ==
History of the Necronomicon has been criticized for depicting Middle Eastern culture and histories in harmful ways, particularly when combined with the pseudobiblia of the text. Gabriel McKee argues that Lovecraft's depiction of the Middle East "as a place of mystery and strangeness" reinforces the public's lack of awareness and knowledge about the region. According to critics, it inadvertently promotes historical illiteracy as it mystifies or, in some extreme cases, demonizes the ancient world. The pseudobiblia and intertextual nature of "History of the Necronomicon" invites fans and authors to alter genuine Middle Eastern histories and attribute abstract moral notions like "good", "evil", or "satanic" to historical sites and figures. It can promote anti-intellectualism surrounding Middle Eastern culture, religion, and history, despite the fact much is known about it by academics in the fields of anthropology and ancient history. This confusion about Lovecraft's works has resulted in official courts of law using a defendant's connection to Lovecraftian literature as evidence for prosecution and the appropriation of Middle Eastern culture in Western cults and supernatural circles.

The origins of Lovecraft's misappropriation of Middle Eastern cultures and histories lie potentially with his xenophobic view points. Lovecraft associated magic and superstition with "Mongoloid peoples" and scholar Erik Davis argues that his fear of miscegenation and immigration can be seen throughout his works. The character of Abdul Alhazred is also a product of this mystification and orientalist understanding of the Middle East, according to essayist Ifran Ali, as Islam was seen in the West as a "mysterious, fringe religion" at the time. Alhazred, who is an apostate Muslim, authored the Necronomicon, a book to summon eldritch entities, which can be seen as a mischaracterization of Islam and the Middle East more generally. Ali argues this furthers Islamophobia as it associates Islam with the occult who are implicitly insane or odd.

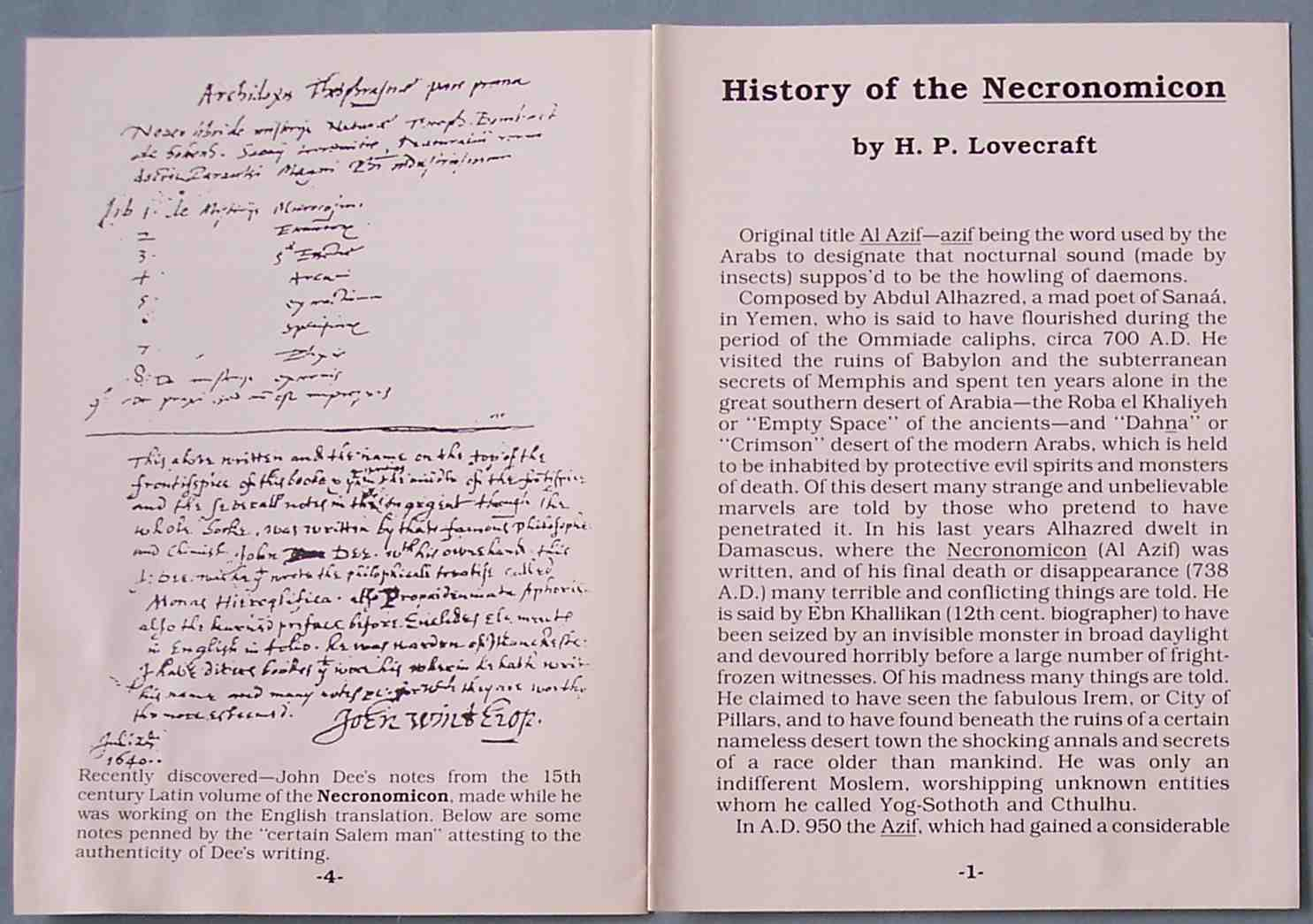
Print version of "History of the Necronomicon"

== Response to criticism ==
Other literary critics have argued that the setting of "History of the Necronomicon" in the Middle East turns the text into a critique of modernism and how Western academia treats non-Western historical artifacts. Haley agrees that the mystification of the Middle East in "History of the Necronomicon" reinforces the representation of the region as strange and foreign, but rather than it expressing Lovecraft's xenophobia, it critiques how history is approached by academics. Abdul Alhazred's title as the "Mad Arab" shows how non-Western scholars are othered and deemed "mad" for their practices and methodologies that do not align with traditional understanding. The Necronomicon is crafted in an empty desert as its creation falls outside the realm of the approved methodologies and research of Western academia. When the Necronomicon appears throughout history it is suppressed by the authorities due to its heretical nature and often appears in times when there are perceived occult activities, such as in the belonging of a man during the Salem witch trials. However, by the 20th century, copies of the Necronomicon can be found in various Western universities, which, according to Haley, shows how the same institutions that have historically demonized and persecuted non-Western artifacts they have not understood will arbitrarily decide it is worth studying, as "it is no longer an item to be feared, but a curiosity to be studied and examined".

Literary critic Ian Almond argues that the differences in analyzing Lovecraft's xenophobia in his works are a reflection of his own conflicting thoughts, simultaneously revealing his own racist assumptions about Arabic culture but also venerating it, given his love of One Thousand and One Nights. Traditional Christian beliefs about Arabic culture in the Middle Ages held that the Middle East was a place of unholy, dark magics. Almond argues Lovecraft balances this belief with a Rosicrucian view of the Middle East as a place with alternative sources of knowledge, information and spirituality compared to traditional Christian dogma. Lovecraft was an atheist, but also held xenophobic ideas, so, according to Almond, an understanding of Lovecraft's worldview is incomplete without an acknowledgment of both sides of his writings.
