= Koftet el hati =

Finger-shaped patty of minced meat eaten in Egypt

Koftet el hati كفتة الحاتى
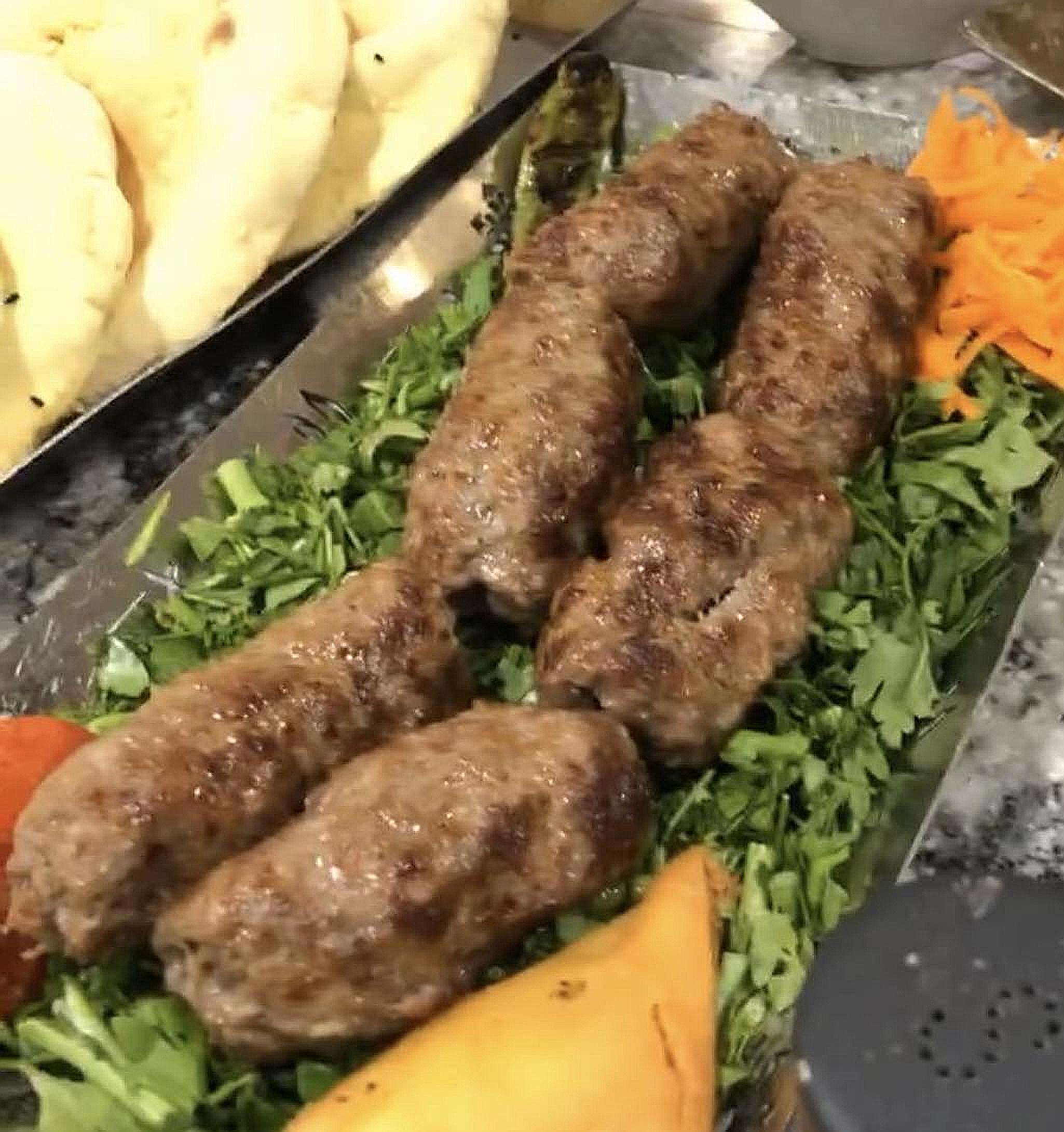
- Alternative names: Kofta
- Type: Kofta
- Place of origin: Egypt
- Main ingredients: Minced beef or lamb

Koftet el hati (Egyptian Arabic: كفتة الحاتى), commonly just referred to as kofta (كفتة) in Egypt, is a traditional Egyptian dish consisting of seasoned ground meat, typically beef or a combination of beef and lamb, mixed with herbs and spices, shaped into cylindrical patties or skewers, and grilled or baked. This dish is a staple in Egyptian cuisine and is one of various forms of kofta eaten in Egypt and across the Middle East.

== Preparation ==
The preparation of koftet el hati begins with finely mincing ground beef or a mixture of beef and lamb, ensuring a tender texture. Fresh parsley, onions, and garlic are finely chopped and combined with the meat to enhance flavor and moisture. A blend of spices, including cumin, coriander, allspice, cardamom, and black pepper, is added to the mixture to impart an aromatic profile. Some recipes incorporate breadcrumbs or soaked bread to bind the mixture and maintain juiciness during cooking. The seasoned meat is then molded onto wooden or metal skewers, forming elongated patties. Traditionally, koftet el hati is grilled over charcoal, imparting a smoky flavor and a charred exterior. Alternatively, it can be cooked on a stovetop grill pan or baked in the oven. Once cooked, kofta is commonly served with eish baladi, tahini, fresh salads, or rice.

== See also ==
- Egyptian cuisine
- Kofta
- List of Middle Eastern dishes
- List of African dishes
