= Tatarsko kyufte =

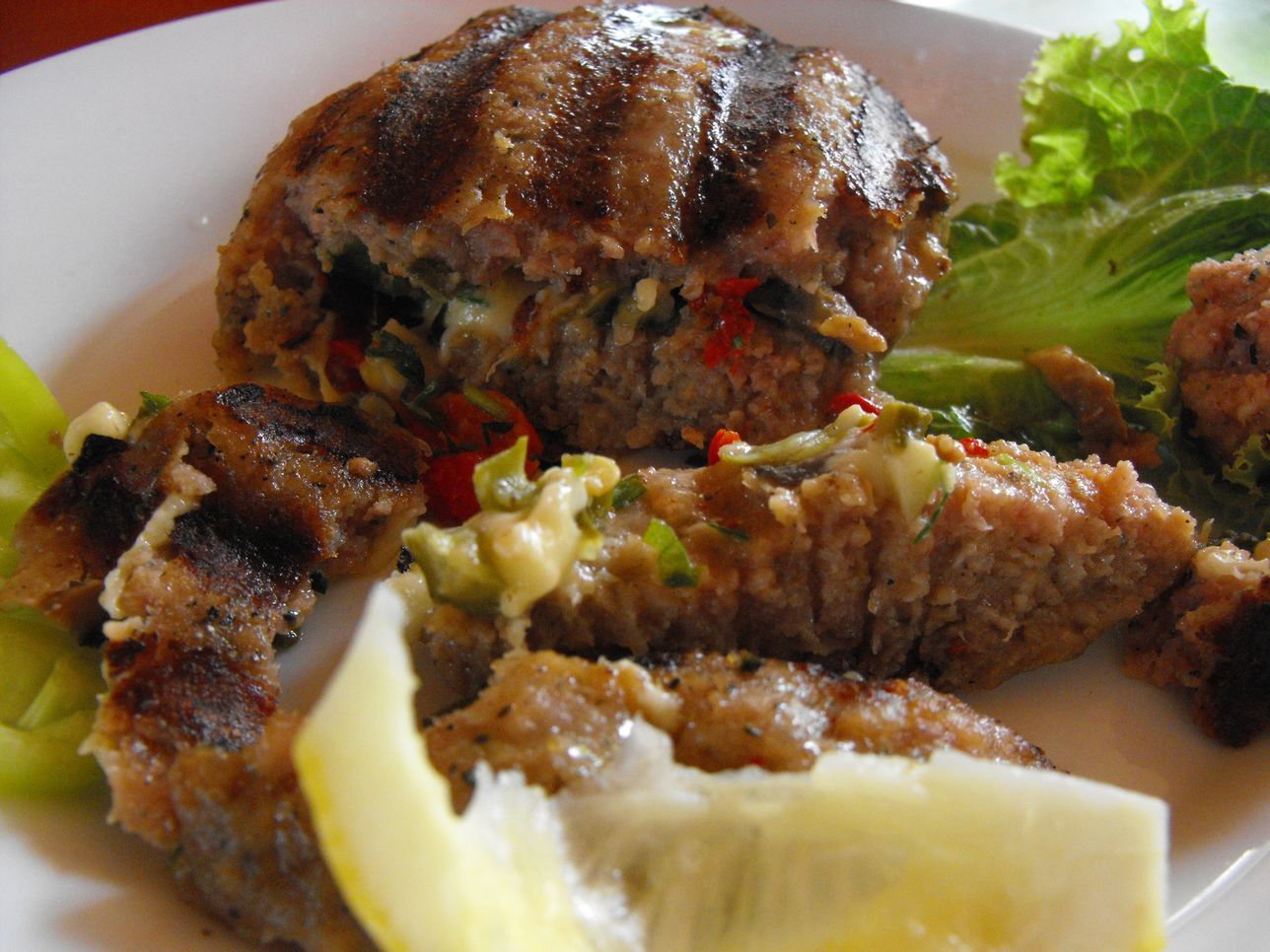
- Course: Main course
- Place of origin: Bulgaria
- Main ingredients: Meat (lamb or beef)

Tatarsko kyufte (Bulgarian: Татарско кюфте, Dobrujan Tatar: Tatar kóftesí; "Tatar kofta") is a Bulgarian recipe for a large kofta. The name references the Tatar minority in Bulgaria.

== See also ==
- Kabab koobideh, Iranian minced meat
- Adana kebabı, Turkish minced meat
- Kebapche, Bulgarian minced meat
- Mititei, Romanian minced meat
- Ćevapi, Balkan minced meat
