= Koftet rozz =

Egyptian meatballs made from minced meat and rice

Koftet rozz كفتة رز
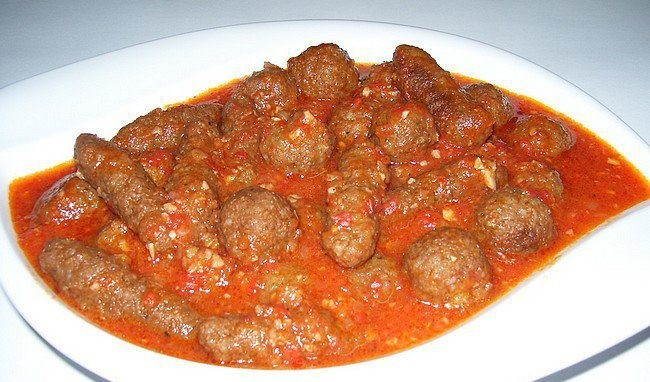
- Type: Kofta
- Place of origin: Egypt
- Main ingredients: Minced meat, rice, tomato sauce

Koftet rozz (Egyptian Arabic: كفتة رز) is an Egyptian dish comprising spiced meatballs made from a mixture of minced meat, crushed rice, and fresh herbs, cooked in a tomato-based sauce.

== Preparation ==
The preparation of koftet rozz begins with washing and soaking short-grain rice, then crushing it into granules, not powder. This crushed rice is combined with minced meat, traditionally camel meat, though ground beef is commonly used, along with finely chopped onions, garlic, and a blend of fresh herbs such as parsley, dill, and cilantro. The mixture is seasoned with spices like cumin, coriander, salt, and black pepper. After thoroughly mixing, the mixture is shaped into medium-sized balls or fingers. These are then deep-fried until golden brown and crunchy. Separately, a tomato-based sauce is prepared by sautéing minced garlic, adding tomato paste, tomato sauce, salt, black pepper, a broth cube, sugar, and water. The fried kofta is then added to the sauce and simmered together for 15-20 minutes. The dish is typically garnished with chopped parsley and served with rice.

An alternative method involves blending onions, garlic, water, and fresh herbs in a blender, then adding ground beef to form a cohesive mixture. This mixture is combined with rice flour, spices, and baking soda, kneaded until soft but firm, then shaped into balls and deep-fried until lightly browned. The fried meatballs can be consumed as is or added to a tomato or marinara sauce before serving.

Another variation includes frying the kofta, then adding them to a sautéed mixture of onions, tomato paste, ground cumin, cinnamon powder, black pepper, chicken stock powder, demi-glace base, water, and potato cubes. The dish is simmered until the potatoes are cooked through. This dish is popular during Ramadan.

== See also ==
- Egyptian cuisine
- Kofta
- List of Middle Eastern dishes
- List of African dishes
