= Necronomicon =

Fictional textbook of magic in stories by H. P. Lovecraft

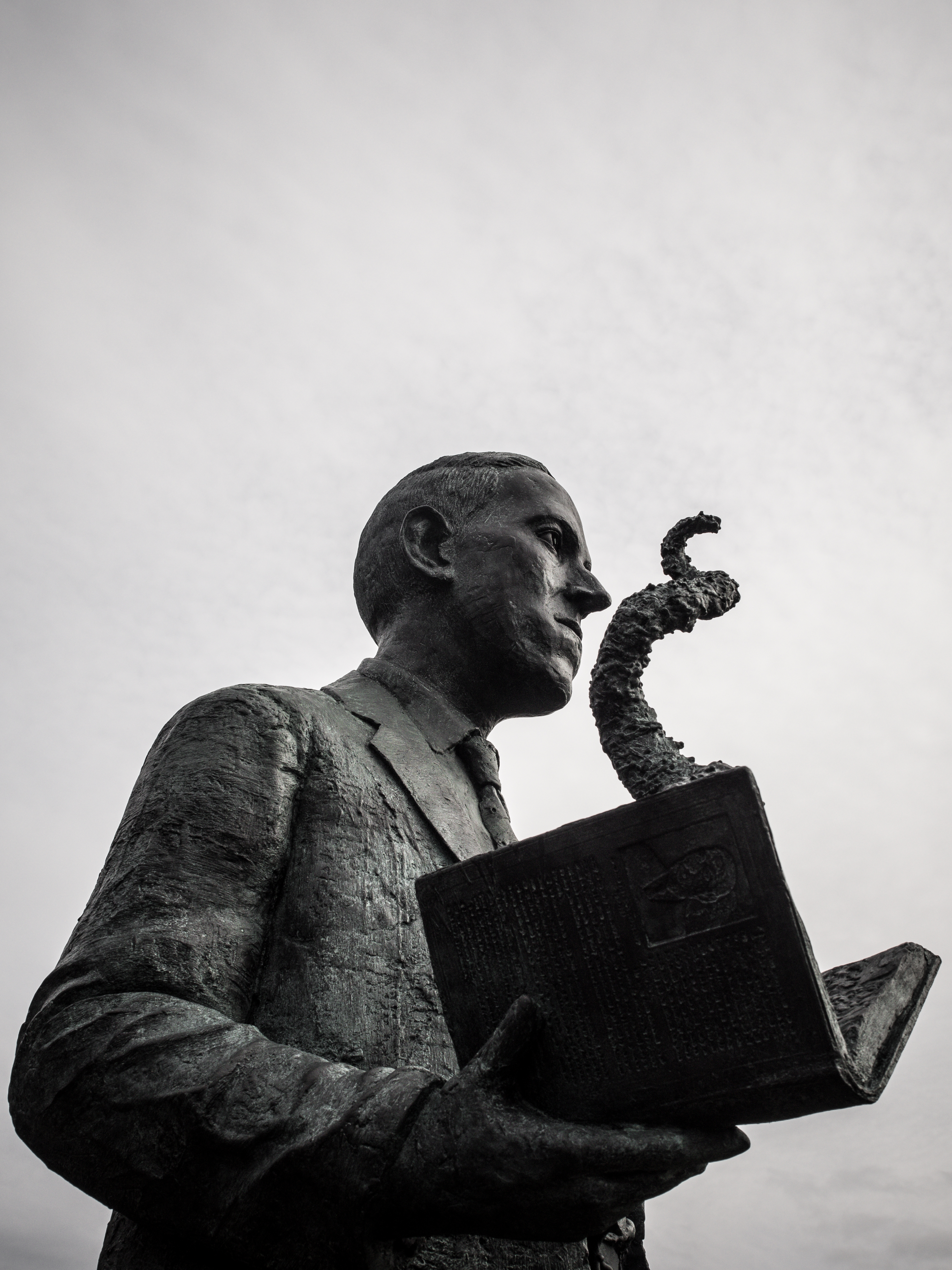
Statue of H. P. Lovecraft in Providence, Rhode Island (Lovecraft's hometown), the author who created the Necronomicon as a fictional grimoire and featured it in many of his stories

The Necronomicon, also referred to as the Book of the Dead, or under a purported original Arabic title of Kitab al-Azif, is a fictional grimoire (textbook of magic) appearing in stories by the horror writer H. P. Lovecraft and his followers. It was first mentioned in Lovecraft's 1924 short story "The Hound", written in 1922, though its purported author, the "Mad Arab" Abdul Alhazred, had been quoted a year earlier in Lovecraft's "The Nameless City". Among other things, the work contains an account of the Old Ones, their history, and the means for summoning them.

Other authors such as August Derleth and Clark Ashton Smith also cited the Necronomicon in their works. Lovecraft approved of other writers building on his work, believing such common allusions built up "a background of evil verisimilitude". Many readers have believed it to be a real work, with booksellers and librarians receiving many requests for it; pranksters have listed it in rare book catalogues, and a student smuggled a card for it into the card catalog of the Yale University Library.

Capitalizing on the notoriety of the fictional volume, real-life publishers have printed many books titled Necronomicon since Lovecraft's death.

== Origin and etymology ==
How Lovecraft conceived the name Necronomicon is not clear—Lovecraft said that the title came to him in a dream. Although some have suggested that Lovecraft was influenced primarily by Robert W. Chambers' collection of short stories The King in Yellow, which centers on a mysterious and disturbing play in book form, Lovecraft is not believed to have read that work until 1927.

Donald R. Burleson has argued that the idea for the book was derived from Nathaniel Hawthorne, though Lovecraft himself noted that "mouldy hidden manuscripts" were one of the stock features of Gothic literature.

Lovecraft wrote that the title, as translated from the Greek language, meant "an image of the law of the dead", compounded respectively from νεκρός nekros "dead", νόμος nomos "law", and εἰκών eikon "image". Robert M. Price notes that the title has been variously translated by others as "Book of the names of the dead", "Book of the laws of the dead", "Book of dead names" and "Knower of the laws of the dead". S. T. Joshi states that Lovecraft's own etymology is "almost entirely unsound. The last portion of it is particularly erroneous, since -ikon is nothing more than a neuter adjectival suffix and has nothing to do with eikõn (image)." Joshi translates the title as "Book considering (or classifying) the dead".

Lovecraft was often asked about the veracity of the Necronomicon, and always answered that it was completely his invention. In a letter to Willis Conover, Lovecraft elaborated upon his typical answer:

Now about the "terrible and forbidden books"—I am forced to say that most of them are purely imaginary. There never was any Abdul Alhazred or Necronomicon, for I invented these names myself. Robert Bloch devised the idea of Ludvig Prinn and his De Vermis Mysteriis, while the Book of Eibon is an invention of Clark Ashton Smith's. Robert E. Howard is responsible for Friedrich von Junzt and his Unaussprechlichen Kulten. ... As for seriously-written books on dark, occult, and supernatural themes—in all truth they don't amount to much. That is why it's more fun to invent mythical works like the Necronomicon and Book of Eibon.

Reinforcing the book's fictionalization, the name of the book's supposed author, Abdul Alhazred, is not even a grammatically correct Arabic name. What is transliterated as "Abdul" in English is actually a noun in the nominative form ʿabdu (عَبْدُ, "servant") and the definite article al- (الـ) and amounts to "servant of the" with the article actually being part of the second noun in the construct, which in this case is supposed to be "Alhazred" (traditional Arabic names do not follow the European first name-surname format). But "Alhazred", even if considered as a corruption of al-ḥaḍrāt (حَضْرَات, "the presences") though it seems unlikely, itself is a definite noun (i.e., a noun prefixed by the definite article) and thus "Abdul Alhazred" could not possibly be a real Arabic name. Lovecraft first used the name "Abdul Alhazred" as a pseudonym he gave himself as a five-year-old, and very likely mistook "Abdul" to be a first name while inventing "Alhazred" as an Arabic-sounding surname.

== Fictional history ==
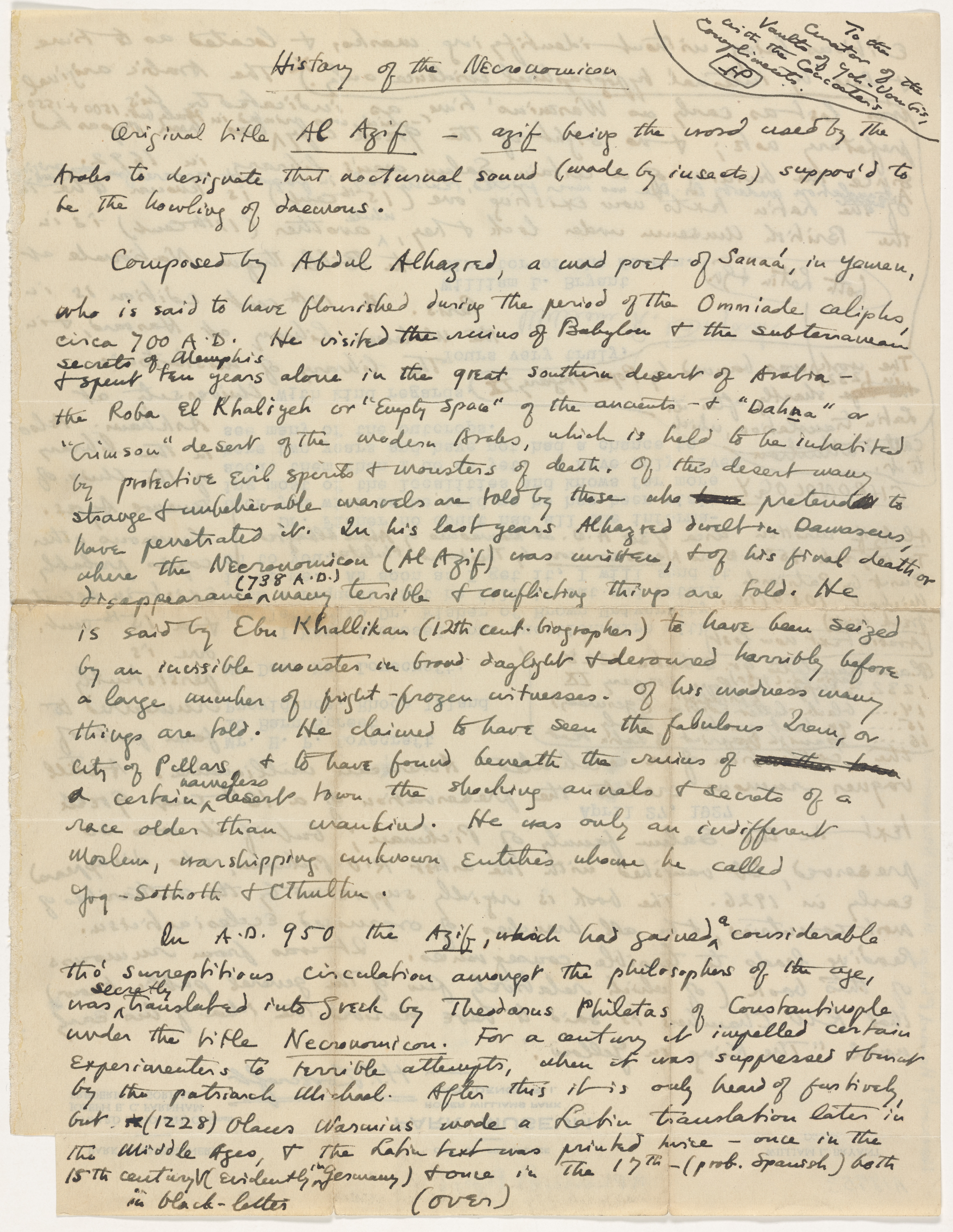
First page of the manuscript of History of the Necronomicon by Lovecraft

In 1927, Lovecraft wrote a brief fictitious history of the Necronomicon. This fictitious history was published in 1938, after his death, as "History of the Necronomicon". According to this account, the book was originally called Al Azif, an Arabic word that Lovecraft defined as "that nocturnal sound (made by insects) supposed to be the howling of demons", drawing on a footnote by Rev. Samuel Henley in Henley's translation of Vathek. Henley, commenting upon a passage which he translated as "those nocturnal insects which presage evil", alluded to the diabolic legend of Beelzebub, "Lord of the Flies" and to Psalm 91:5, which in some 16th century English Bibles (such as Myles Coverdale's 1535 translation) describes "bugges by night" where later translations render "terror by night". Classical Arabic lexicographer Ibn Manzur (1233–1311 CE) defines ʿazīf (عَزيف) in Lisan al-Arab as the sound of wind or the rustling of desert sand - traditionally attributed by ancient Arabs to the eerie voices of the jinn - rather than nocturnal insects. In the 10th century, Arab geographer Al-Hamdani (893–945 CE) recorded in Sifat Jazirat al-Arab that specific desert dunes were historically known as maʿāzif al-jinn ("musical instruments or haunts of the jinn"), tying the term directly to Arabian desert geography and folklore. British explorer H. St. John Philby documented this phenomenon in his 1933 account The Empty Quarter, describing how sliding sand dunes produced loud, organ-like vibrations ("singing sands") that local Bedouins attributed to the jinn, providing a field-observed explanation for the ancient tradition of ʿazīf.

In the "History", Alhazred is said to have been a "half-crazed Arab" who worshipped the Lovecraftian entities Yog-Sothoth and Cthulhu in the early 700s CE. He is described as being from Sanaá in Yemen. He visited the ruins of Babylon, the "subterranean secrets" of Memphis and the Empty Quarter of Arabia. In his last years, he lived in Damascus, where he wrote Al Azif before his sudden and mysterious death in 738, which, according to Ibn Khallikan (whom Lovecraft's manuscript erroneously identifies as a "12th cent. biographer", though he lived in the 13th century, 1211–1282 CE), happened when he was "seized by an invisible monster in broad daylight and devoured horribly before a large number of fright-frozen witnesses". In subsequent years, Lovecraft wrote, the Azif "gained considerable, though surreptitious circulation amongst the philosophers of the age." In 950, it was translated into Greek and given the title Necronomicon by Theodorus Philetas, a fictional scholar from Constantinople. This version "impelled certain experimenters to terrible attempts" before being "suppressed and burnt" in 1050 by Patriarch Michael (a historical figure who died in 1059).

After this attempted suppression, the work was "only heard of furtively" until it was translated from Greek into Latin by Olaus Wormius. (Lovecraft gives the date of this edition as 1228, though the real-life Danish scholar Olaus Wormius lived from 1588 to 1654.) Both the Latin and Greek text, the "History" relates, were banned by Pope Gregory IX in 1232, though Latin editions were apparently published in 15th century Germany and 17th century Spain. A Greek edition was printed in Italy in the first half of the 16th century. The Elizabethan magician John Dee (1527 – c. 1609) allegedly translated the book—presumably into English—but Lovecraft wrote that this version was never printed and only fragments survive.

According to Lovecraft, the Arabic version of Al Azif had already disappeared by the time the Greek version was banned in 1050, though he cites "a vague account of a secret copy appearing in San Francisco during the current [20th] century" that "later perished in fire". The Greek version, he writes, has not been reported "since the burning of a certain Salem man's library in 1692", an apparent reference to the Salem witch trials. (In the story "The Diary of Alonzo Typer", the character Alonzo Typer finds a Greek copy.) According to "History of the Necronomicon" the very act of studying the text is inherently dangerous, as those who attempt to master its arcane knowledge generally meet terrible ends.

== Appearance and contents ==
The Necronomicon is mentioned in a number of Lovecraft's short stories and in his novellas At the Mountains of Madness and The Case of Charles Dexter Ward. However, despite frequent references to the book, Lovecraft was very sparing of details about its appearance and contents. He once wrote that "if anyone were to try to write the Necronomicon, it would disappoint all those who have shuddered at cryptic references to it."

In "The Nameless City" (1921), a rhyming couplet that appears at two points in the story is ascribed to Abdul Alhazred:

That is not dead which can eternal lie.
And with strange aeons even death may die.

The same couplet appears in "The Call of Cthulhu" (1928), where it is identified as a quotation from the Necronomicon. This "much-discussed" couplet, as Lovecraft calls it in the latter story, has also been quoted in works by other authors, including Brian Lumley's The Burrowers Beneath, which adds a long paragraph preceding the couplet.

In his story "History of the Necronomicon", Lovecraft states that it is rumored that artist R. U. Pickman (from his story "Pickman's Model") owned a Greek translation of the text, but it vanished along with the artist in early 1926.

The Necronomicon is undoubtedly a substantial text, as indicated by its description in "The Dunwich Horror" (1929). In the story, Wilbur Whateley visits Miskatonic University's library to consult the "unabridged" version of the Necronomicon for a spell that would have appeared on the 751st page of his own inherited, but defective, Dee edition. The Necronomicon introduces the incantation with this passage:

Nor is it to be thought ... that man is either the oldest or the last of earth's masters, or that the common bulk of life and substance walks alone. The Old Ones were, the Old Ones are, and the Old Ones shall be. Not in the spaces we know, but between them, they walk serene and primal, undimensioned and to us unseen. Yog-Sothoth knows the gate. Yog-Sothoth is the gate. Yog-Sothoth is the key and guardian of the gate. Past, present, future, all are one in Yog-Sothoth. He knows where the Old Ones broke through of old, and where They shall break through again. He knows where They had trod earth's fields, and where They still tread them, and why no one can behold Them as They tread. By Their smell can men sometimes know Them near, but of Their semblance can no man know, saving only in the features of those They have begotten on mankind; and of those are there many sorts, differing in likeness from man's truest eidolon to that shape without sight or substance which is Them. They walk unseen and foul in lonely places where the Words have been spoken and the Rites howled through at their Seasons. The wind gibbers with Their voices, and the earth mutters with Their consciousness. They bend the forest and crush the city, yet may not forest or city behold the hand that smites. Kadath in the cold waste hath known Them, and what man knows Kadath? The ice desert of the South and the sunken isles of Ocean hold stones whereon Their seal is engraven, but who hath seen the deep frozen city or the sealed tower long garlanded with seaweed and barnacles? Great Cthulhu is Their cousin, yet can he spy Them only dimly. Iä! Shub-Niggurath! As a foulness shall ye know Them. Their hand is at your throats, yet ye see Them not; and Their habitation is even one with your guarded threshold. Yog-Sothoth is the key to the gate, whereby the spheres meet. Man rules now where They ruled once; They shall soon rule where man rules now. After summer is winter, after winter summer. They wait patient and potent, for here shall They reign again.

The Necronomicon's appearance and physical dimensions are not clearly stated in Lovecraft's work. Other than the obvious black letter editions, it is commonly portrayed as bound in leather of various types and having metal clasps. Moreover, editions are sometimes disguised. In The Case of Charles Dexter Ward, for example, John Merrit pulls down a book labelled Qanoon-e-Islam from Joseph Curwen's bookshelf and discovers to his disquiet that it is actually the Necronomicon.

Many commercially available versions of the book fail to include any of the contents that Lovecraft describes. The Simon Necronomicon in particular has been criticized for this.

== Locations ==
According to Lovecraft's "History of the Necronomicon", copies of the original Necronomicon were held by only five institutions worldwide:

- The British Museum
- The Bibliothèque nationale de France
- Widener Library of Harvard University in Cambridge, Massachusetts
- The University of Buenos Aires
- The library of the fictional Miskatonic University in the also fictitious Arkham, Massachusetts

The Miskatonic University also holds the Latin translation by Olaus Wormius, printed in Spain in the 17th century.

Other copies, Lovecraft wrote, were kept by private individuals. Joseph Curwen, as noted, had a copy in The Case of Charles Dexter Ward (1941). A version is held in Kingsport in "The Festival" (1925). The provenance of the copy read by the narrator of "The Nameless City" is unknown; a version is read by the protagonist in "The Hound" (1924).

== Hoaxes ==
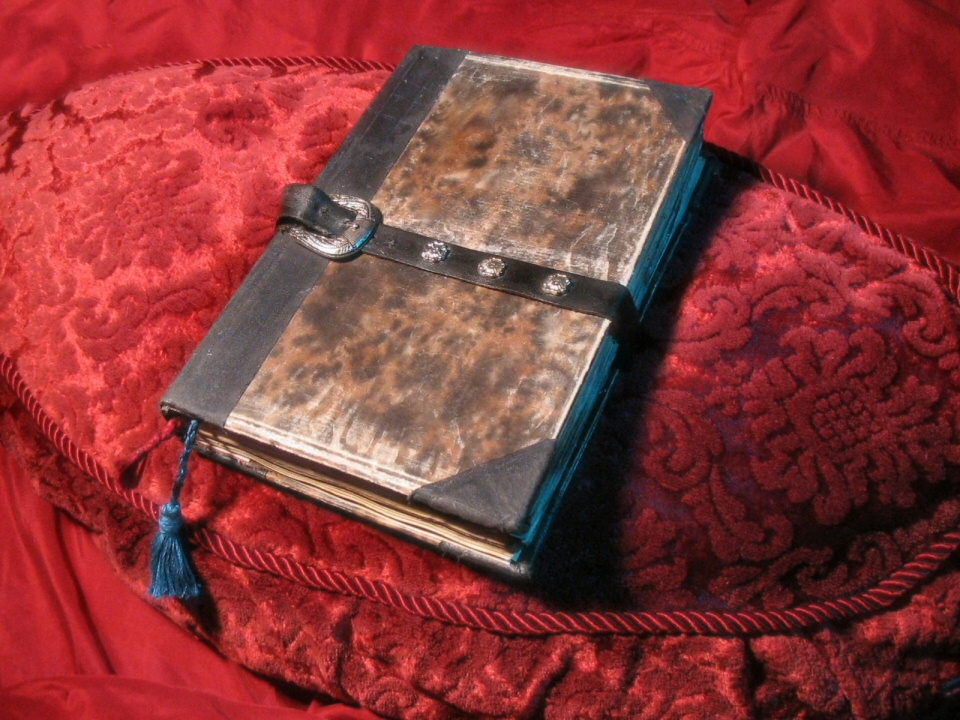
A fan-created prop representing the Necronomicon (2004)

Lovecraft felt that a well-written weird story should be believable and constructed like a convincing hoax. Therefore, many of his stories were written as if they were first-hand testimonials or news stories, leading some readers to believe there could be truth to them. Lovecraft said he felt guilty when he heard of fans searching libraries for real-life copies of the Necronomicon. Pranksters occasionally listed the Necronomicon for sale in bookstores or in library card catalogues. The Vatican receives requests for this book from those who believe the Vatican Library holds a copy.

Starting in the 1950s, various hoaxes were published that purported to be the real Necronomicon. However, none of these early hoaxes made a serious claim to authenticity and were understood to be homages. The early hoaxes typically combined excerpts of previously published occult books with references to Lovecraft's fiction. In 1973, George H. Scithers commercially published a hoax Necronomicon under his publishing company Owlswick. It featured an introduction by L. Sprague de Camp that purported it to be untranslatable and detailed a fictional history of various attempted translators who died mysteriously. In reality, it consisted of repeated, nonsensical glyphs in a fictional language known as Duriac. When some credulous customers believed it to be authentic, Scithers attempted to convince them otherwise. Around the same time, LaVeyan Satanists and some occultists became interested in incorporating Lovecraft's mythology into their rituals.

Drawn by the success of Scithers' Necronomicon, more followed. The most famous of these is the Simon Necronomicon, published in 1977. This book, by the pseudonymous "Simon", has little connection to the fictional Lovecraft Mythos but instead is based on Sumerian mythology. The author uses this as evidence of its authenticity, arguing that a hoax spellbook would not use the title of an in-universe spellbook from series of horror stories. It purports to come from an ancient manuscript that predates Lovecraft's stories, though there is no record of such a thing. Simon's story incorporates two real-life thieves who were arrested for selling stolen manuscripts, but they have no connection to the Simon Necronomicon, and nobody has ever produced the alleged manuscript. Instead, it is likely that Peter Levenda, the registered copyright holder of several of Simon's books, is the author. Levenda has denied this. The other major work was a hoax edited by George Hay, which was published in 1978 and included an introduction by the paranormal researcher and writer Colin Wilson. David Langford described how the book was prepared from a computer analysis of a discovered "cipher text" by John Dee. The resulting "translation" was in fact written by occultist Robert Turner, but it was far truer to the Lovecraftian version than the Simon text and incorporated quotations from Lovecraft's stories in its passages.

In 2004, Necronomicon: The Wanderings of Alhazred, by Canadian occultist Donald Tyson, was published by Llewellyn Worldwide. Donald Tyson has clearly stated that the Necronomicon is fictional, but that has not prevented his book from being the center of some controversy. Tyson has since published Alhazred, a novelization of the life of the Necronomicon's author.

Kenneth Grant, the British occultist, disciple of Aleister Crowley, and head of the Typhonian Ordo Templi Orientis, suggested in his 1972 book The Magical Revival that there was an unconscious connection between Crowley and Lovecraft. He thought they both drew on the same occult forces; Crowley via his magic and Lovecraft through the dreams which inspired his stories and the Necronomicon. Grant claimed that the Necronomicon existed as an astral book as part of the Akashic records and could be accessed through ritual magic or in dreams. Grant's ideas on Lovecraft were featured heavily in the introduction to the Simon Necronomicon and also have been backed by Tyson.

== See also ==
- List of spurious works of fiction – Fictional works not confirmed to exist
- List of Cthulhu Mythos books
- Cthulhu Mythos in popular culture – Cultural references to H. P. Lovecraft
- Found manuscript – Literary technique
- Grimoire – Book of magic spells, invocations, and talismans
- Necronomicon Press – American small press publisher
- Simon Necronomicon – Modern spellbook and occult text
- Alchemy and chemistry in medieval Islam
- Astrology in medieval Islam – Islamic astrology of the Golden Age
- Necronomicon: The Best Weird Tales of H. P. Lovecraft: Commemorative Edition – 2008 collection of stories by H. P. Lovecraft
- Abdul Alhazred (comics)
