= Islama köfte =

Turkish dish from Adapazarı

Islama Köfte
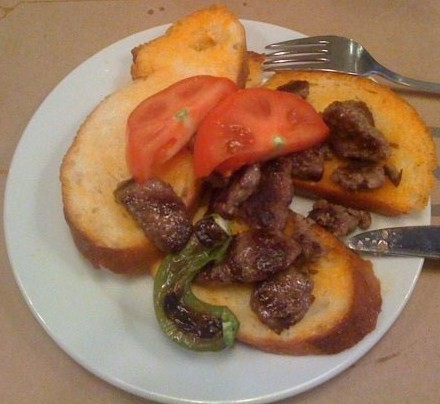
- Type: Entree
- Place of origin: Turkey
- Main ingredients: meat, spice, broth, bread

Islama köfte is a traditional dish originated in Adapazarı, the capital of Sakarya Province in Turkey.

They are served with bread slices and unfermented grape juice on the side. The sliced bread is dipped in meat broth and grilled along with the meatballs. Tomato slices and green hot peppers accompany the dish, also piyaz can be eaten along with it.

Islama köfte is a popular dish in Turkey.

== See also ==
- Entree
- Köfte
- Piyaz
- Turkish cuisine
