= Alhazred (novel) =

2006 Cthulhu Mythos novel by Donald Tyson

- Author: Donald Tyson
- Publisher: Llewellyn Publications
- Publication date: July 8, 2006
- ISBN: 978-0-7387-0892-8

Alhazred is a 2006 Cthulhu Mythos novel by Canadian writer Donald Tyson. The book is a follow-up to Tyson's 2004 "translation" of the Necronomicon. Like Tyson's Necronomicon and related works, Alhazred draws heavily from the work of early 20th-century American fiction writer H. P. Lovecraft.

== Synopsis ==
The book is written as an autobiographical account of the life of Abdul Alhazred, the author of the legendary grimoire known as the Necronomicon. The book does not draw on any previous accounts of Alhazred's life, but portrays him instead as a tragic antihero. The book begins with a short narrative describing how Alhazred was tortured as a young man by the ruthless king of his home city, which is explained in gruesome detail. The tortures endured by Alhazred (and his subsequent banishment from his home) contribute to his violent attitude as an adult, which leads him to commit, among other acts, cannibalism, the murder of innocent children and assisting a cult of ghouls in their war against a rival clan.

Throughout his travels, Alhazred learns to use his abilities (lack of empathy, uncanny agility and the ability to communicate with the dead) to survive, often in gratuitously self-serving ways. He accumulates an array of grim survival tools, such as an obsidian blade and mysterious spiders which, when eaten, grant him the ability to see in the dark and amplified hearing. He also encounters many beings and characters from the Cthulhu Mythos in which his adventures take place.
