= Qanoon-e-Islam =

1832 book by Jaffur Shurreef

Qanoon-e-Islam: or, the Customs of the Moosulmans of India
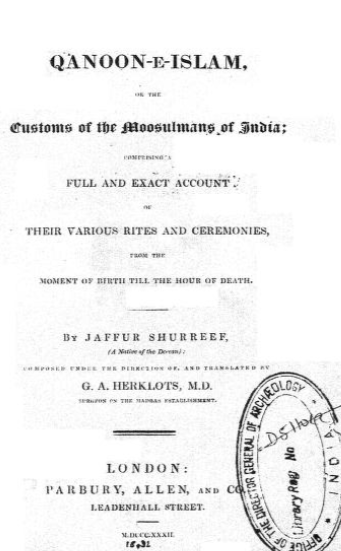
- Author: Jaffur Shurreef
- Translator: Gerhard Andreas Herklots
- Subject: Islam
- Publisher: Parbury, Allen, and Co.
- English publication date: 1832
- Media type: Print
- Pages: 436

Qanoon-e-Islam: or, the Customs of the Moosulmans of India (later published as The Qānūn-i-Islām; the customs of the Musalmāns of India) is a book describing the culture and rituals of Indian Muslims in the nineteenth century. It was written by Jaffur Shurreef (Ja'far Sharīf) and translated into English by Gerhard Andreas Herklots in 1832. H. P. Lovecraft mentions this book in his story The Case of Charles Dexter Ward, where its title is used for disguising the text of the Necronomicon.
