= Mondeghili =

Italian fried meatball

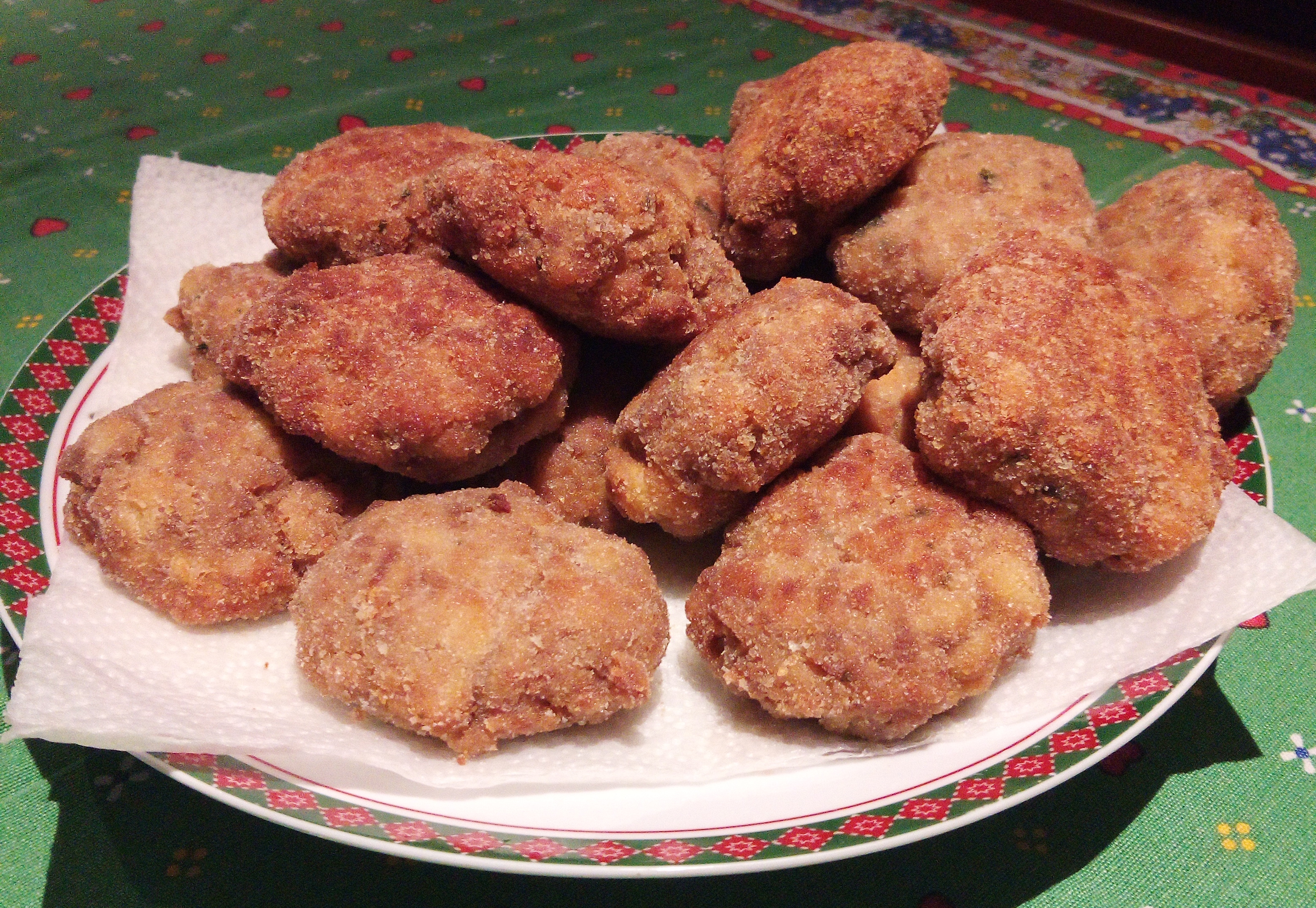
- Alternative names: Mondeghini
- Course: Secondo (Italian course)
- Place of origin: Italy
- Region or state: Lombardy
- Associated cuisine: Italian (Lombard)
- Main ingredients: Leftover boiled meat; egg; bread; milk; parsley; salt

Mondeghili (Milanese: mondeghili), also known outside Milan as mondeghini (Lombard: mondeghitt), are meatballs typical of Milanese cuisine.

The dish was developed as a way to use up leftover cuts of meat, usually beef because of its popularity in Milan. The meatballs are often enriched with sausage, raw salami, liver, mortadella and other pork.

Although mondeghili were granted the Denominazione comunale d'origine (De.C.O.) by the City of Milan in 2008, they are also traditionally prepared in Pavia—where they are known as munighili—and in the Lomellina area, where they go by the name friciulìn.

== History ==
The dish was created during the Spanish domination of the Duchy of Milan, between 1535 and 1706. Its name is likely derived from the Spanish albóndiga (diminutive form: albondiguito, meaning 'little meatball'), which in turn originates from the Arabic term for fried meatballs, al-bunduq (البندق, literally 'the hazelnuts').

The first attested recipe for mondeghili dates back to 1839. The mixture included potatoes (for sure not part of the older recipes, since its usage was uncommon in Milanese cuisine before the 19th century), breadcrumbs soaked in milk, eggs, cheese, garlic (or onion) and nutmeg. This mixture would be formed into balls, fried, and served very hot. This makes the dish quite heavy. Due to this heaviness and the bad hygienic conditions of the era, doctor Angelo Dubini in his 1842 book La cucina per gli stomachi deboli (Cooking for weak stomachs) recommended to "never eat mondeghili at an osteria". In Francesco Cherubini's Milanese-Italian Dictionary (1839), mondeghili are defined as "a kind of meatball made with old meat, bread, egg and similar ingredients". Since then, the recipe has not changed much, save for refinements in the method of preparation. The dish remains a street food popular among the common people. Nowadays they are mainly served to accompany an aperitivo, but also during lunch or dinner. In Milan, there are those who order them as an appetizer, and those who prefer them as a second course, often accompanied by a sauce.

Almost all dialectal texts between the end of the 1800s and the beginning of the 1900s, starting from those by Carlo Porta, mention mondeghili. The dish is cited also by The Betrothed (Italian: I promessi sposi) by Alessandro Manzoni, the most famous Italian novel: in chapter VII, Renzo Tramaglino, the novel's protagonist, offers a bite to his friends Tonio and Gervaso at an osteria in Milan, and the innkeeper announces: "And now I will bring you a plate of meatballs, the like you have never eaten."

In 2008 the mondeghili were inserted in the official De.CO (denominazione comunale d'origine), or De.Co. (denominazione comunale), product list of the city of Milan.

== Preparation ==
According to the De.C.O. recipe, the ingredients for four people are: 300 g of leftover boiled meat, one egg, the crumbs of a rosetta bread soaked in milk, squeezed and sifted; chopped parsley; yellow lemon peel to taste; salt; butter for frying. The leftovers of festive dishes, typically braised or boiled, are chopped together with mortadella, sausage, stale bread soaked in milk, combined with egg and spices, breaded and finally molded to take an intermediate form between a meatball and a small burger patty. Since this dish is based upon reused food, there are numerous variations in the ingredient list. The meatballs are then fried in butter, as is customary in Lombardy.

== See also ==
- List of meatball dishes
