= The Baker's Mark =

Sandwich restaurant in Portland, Oregon, U.S.

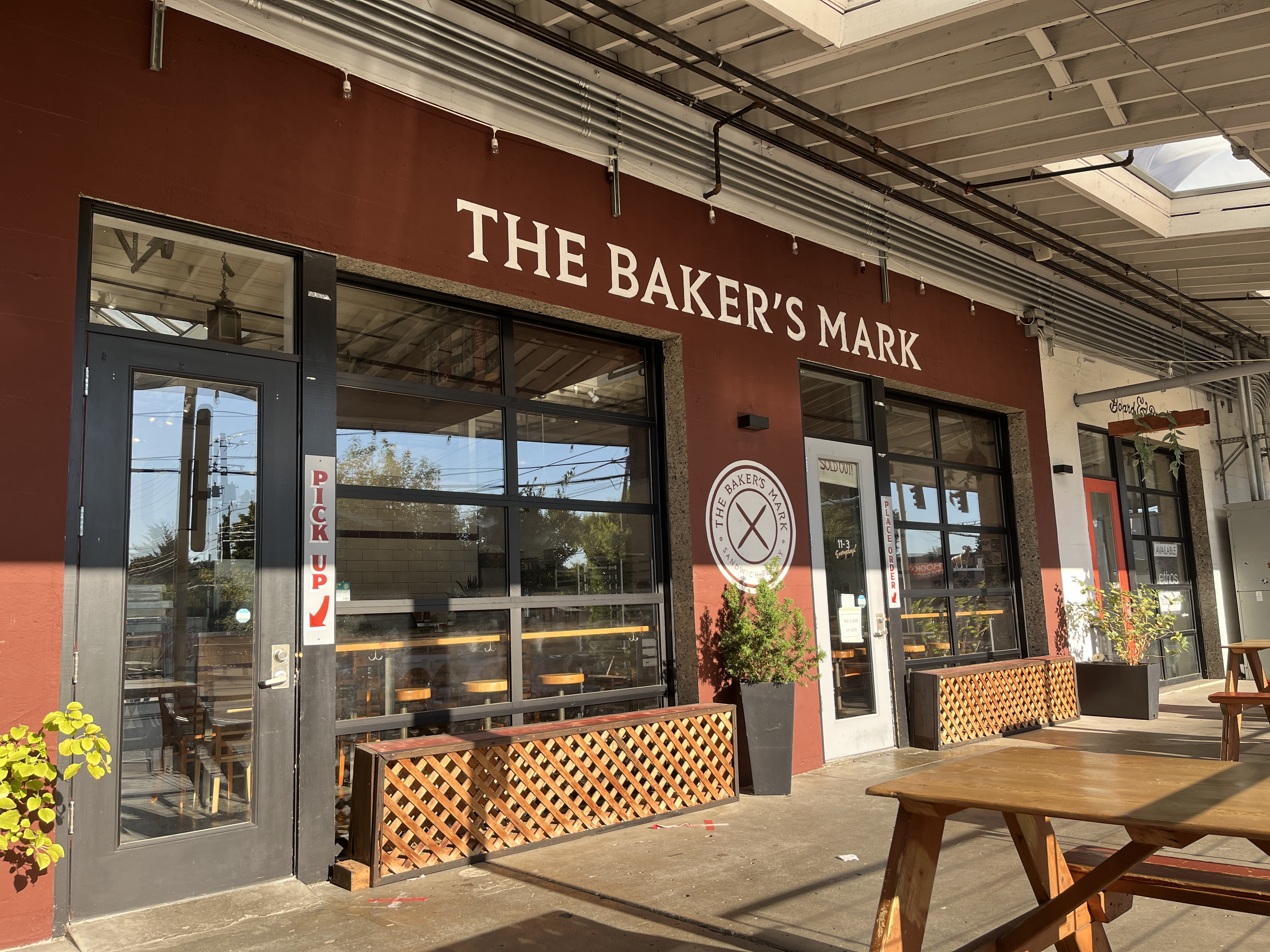
- Exterior of the restaurant in southeast Portland, Oregon, 2025
- Interactive map of The Baker's Mark

Restaurant information
- Location: Portland, Multnomah, Oregon, United States
- Coordinates: 45.5047°N 122.6540°W
- Website: thebakersmark.com

The Baker's Mark is a sandwich restaurant in Portland, Oregon, United States. The original location is in southeast Portland and an outpost operates in northwest Portland's Pearl District.

== Description ==
The Baker's Mark operates two sandwich shops in Portland, Oregon. The original shop operates on Division Street in southeast Portland's Hosford-Abernethy neighborhood and an outpost is at the intersection of 10th and Everett in northwest Portland's Pearl District. Portland Monthly has described the business as a"blue-collar sandwich operation with a small but steady following".

Sandwich options include a meatball sub, French dip, ham and cheese, and a BLT with turkey. The Godfather has prosciutto, salami, capicola, ham, mortadella, and provolone. The business bakes its own bread as well as cookies.

== History ==
Mark and Lenore Eklund are owners. In August 2014, Eater Portland said the restaurant planned to open in November. The Pearl District location opened in January 2020.

For Sandwich Week in 2022, the restaurant served a Spicy Bourbon on Spicy Dutch Crunch.

== Reception ==
Michael Russell ranked the business tenth in The Oregonian's 2017 ranking of Portland's 17 best sandwich shops. The newspaper's Samantha Bakall also included the restaurant in a list of Portland's 10 hottest new restaurants of 2017. Alex Frane included The Baker's Mark in Thrillist's 2020 overview of Portland's best sandwiches. He later included the business in Eater Portland's 2025 list of the city's 19 best sandwich shops. The Baker's Mark also placed second in the Best Sandwich Shop category and was a finalist in the Best Deli category of Willamette Week's annual 'Best of Portland' readers' poll in 2025.
