= Meatball sandwich =

Sandwich made with meatballs

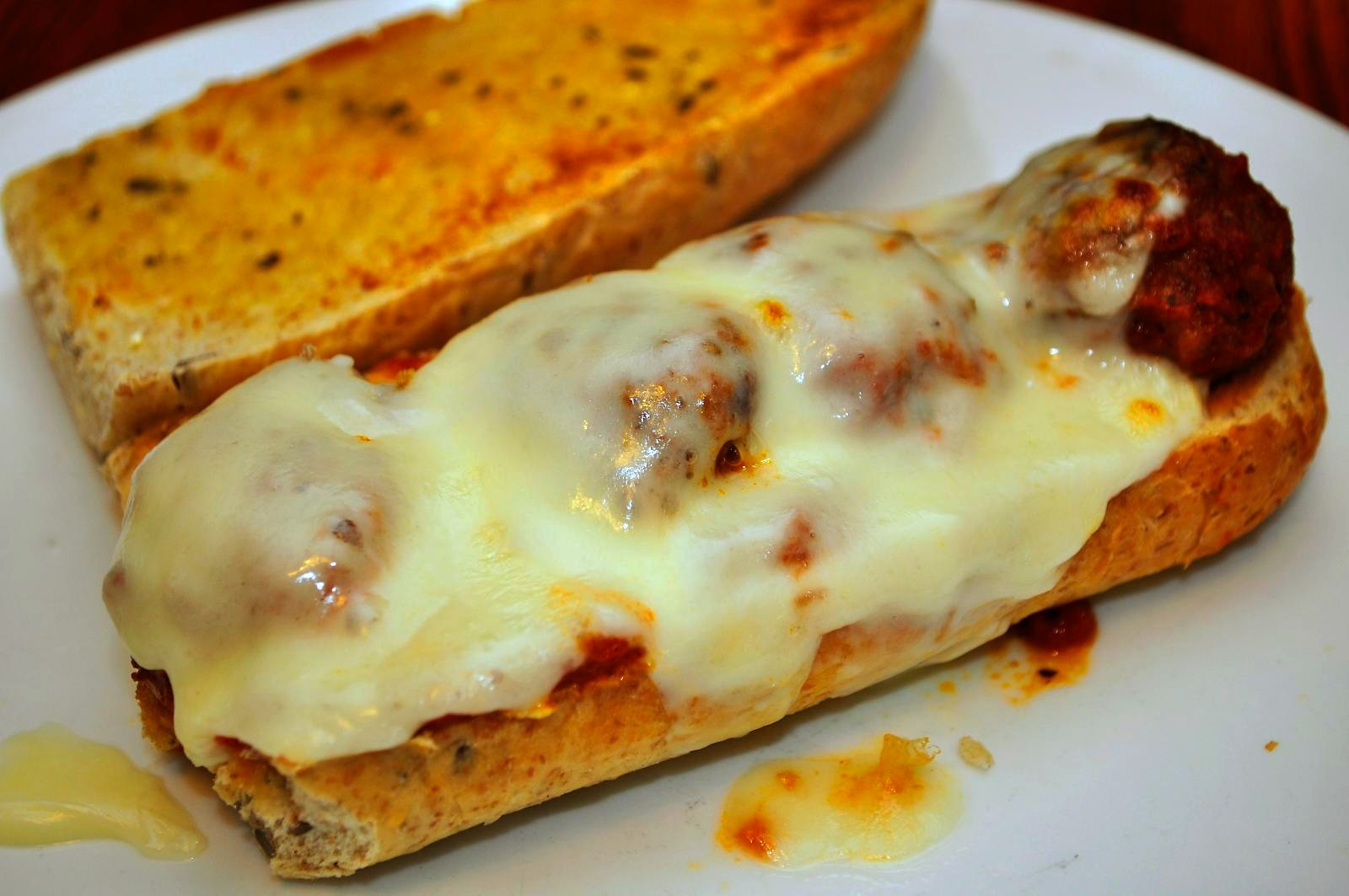
- Meatball submarine sandwich associated with Italian-American cuisine
- Course: Sandwich
- Place of origin: United States
- Serving temperature: Hot
- Main ingredients: Meatballs, bread
- Variations: Tomato or marinara sauce

The meatball sandwich is a common sandwich that is a part of several cuisines, including Italian-American cuisine and American cuisine.

== Overview ==
The sandwich primarily consists of meatballs (typically made from beef or pork), a tomato sauce, commonly marinara, and bread, such as Italian bread, baguette and bread rolls. Cheese such as provolone and mozzarella is sometimes used as an ingredient. Additional ingredients can include garlic, green pepper and butter, among others. It is sometimes prepared in the form of a submarine sandwich.

== History ==
It has been suggested that the meatball sandwich was invented in the United States around the time of the turn of the 20th century, although the specific location is disputed.

== Gallery ==
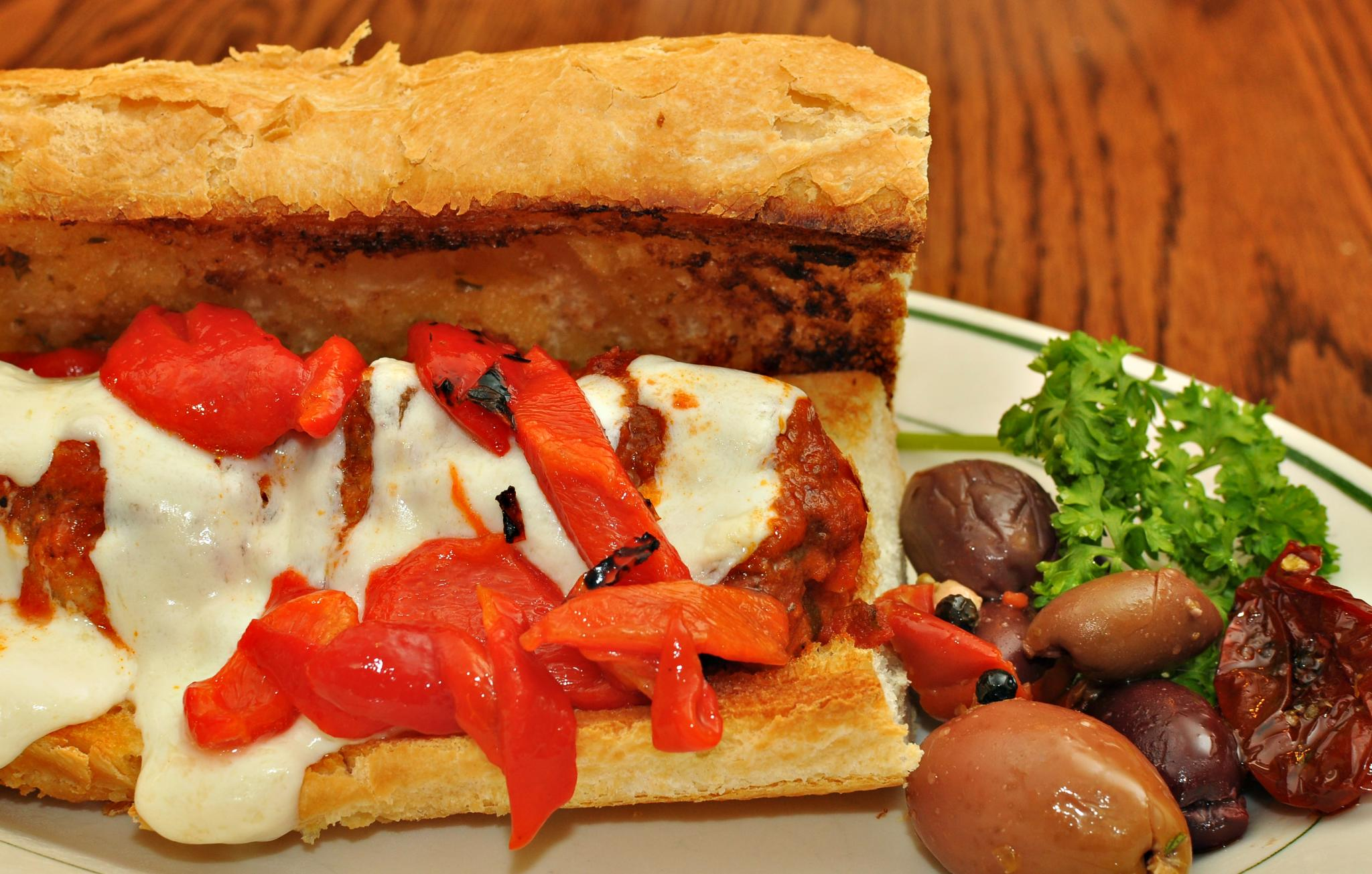
A meatball sandwich with marinara sauce, mozzarella and roasted peppers

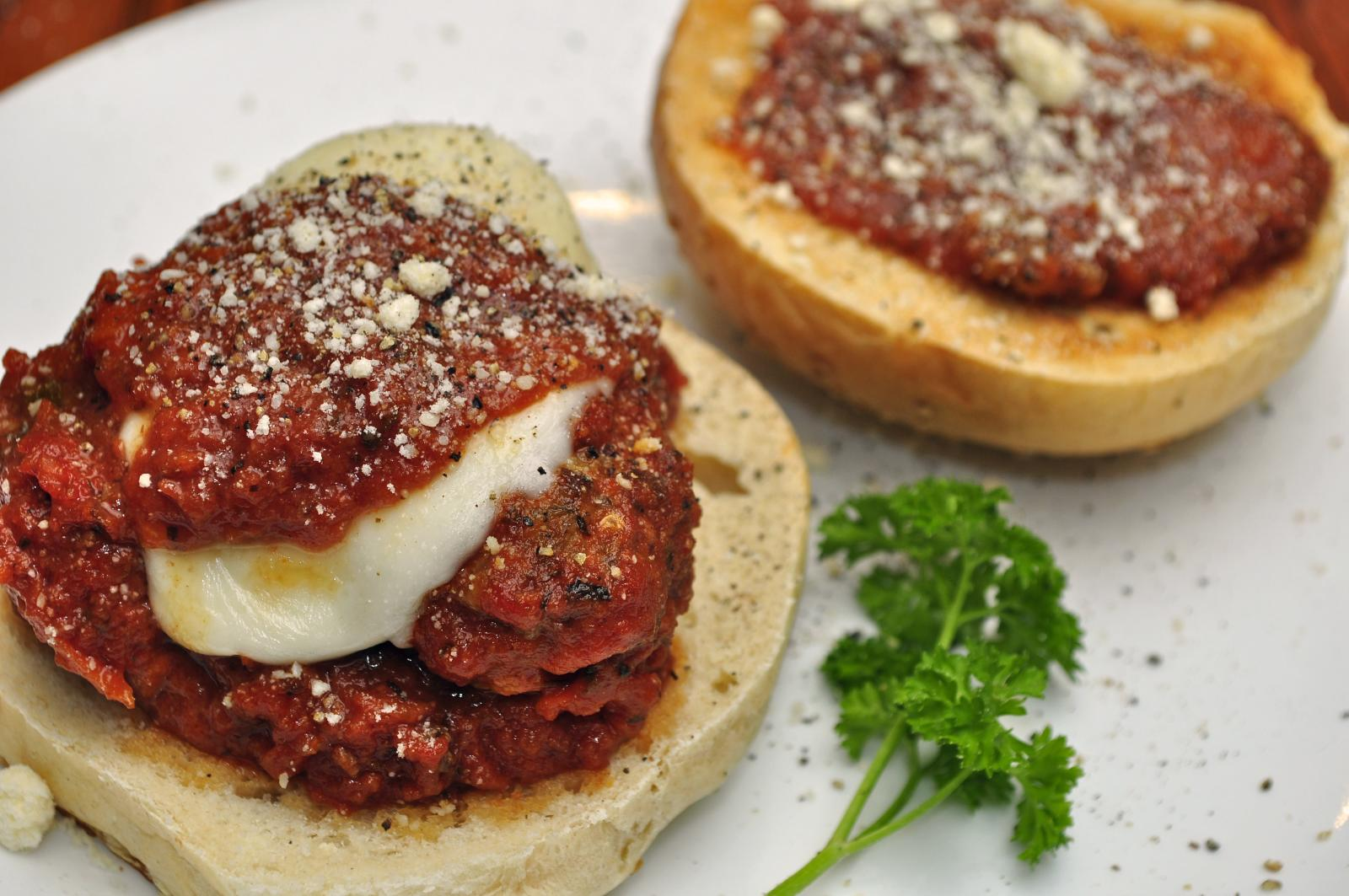
A meatball sandwich prepared using a bun

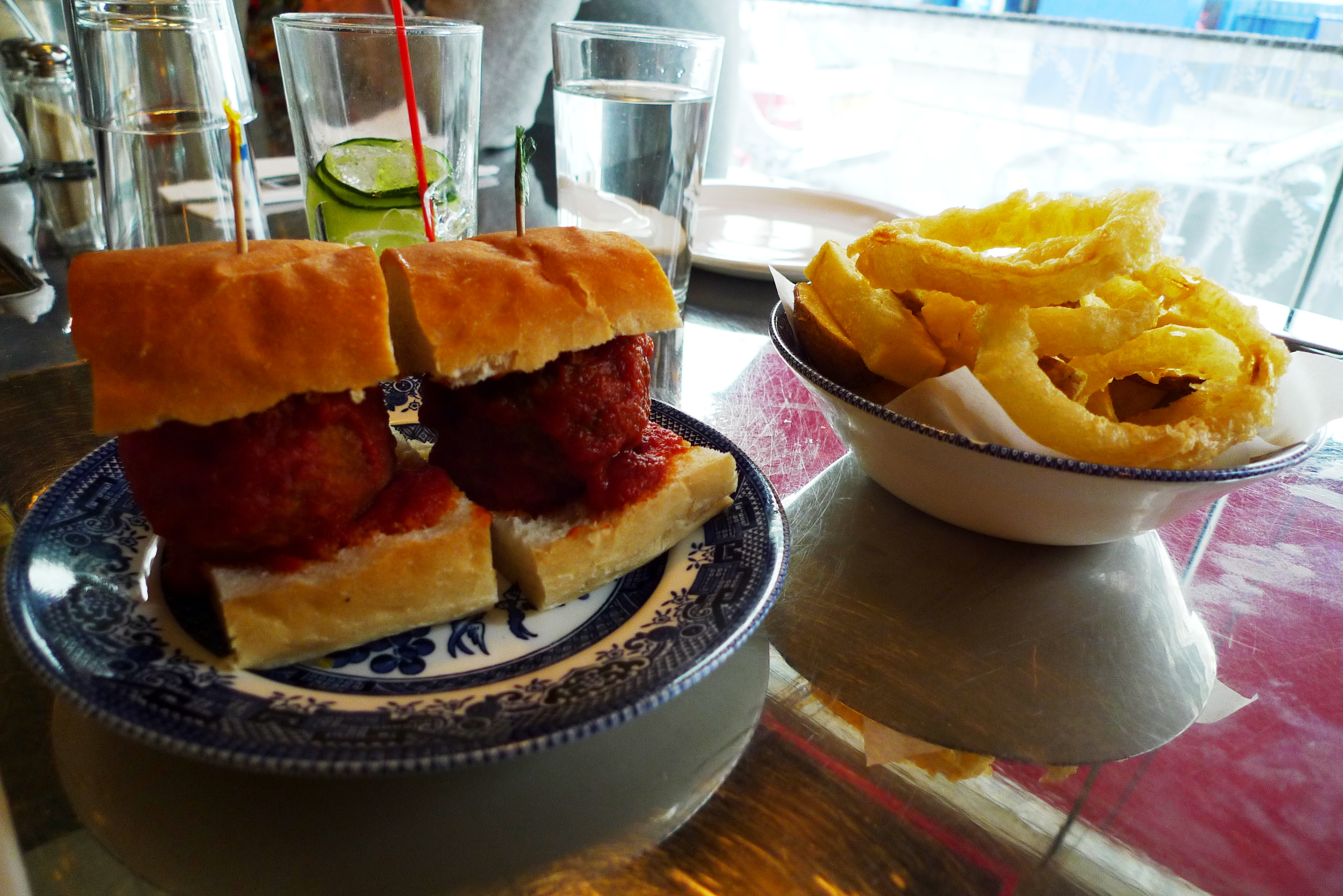
A meatball sandwich with onion rings at a London restaurant

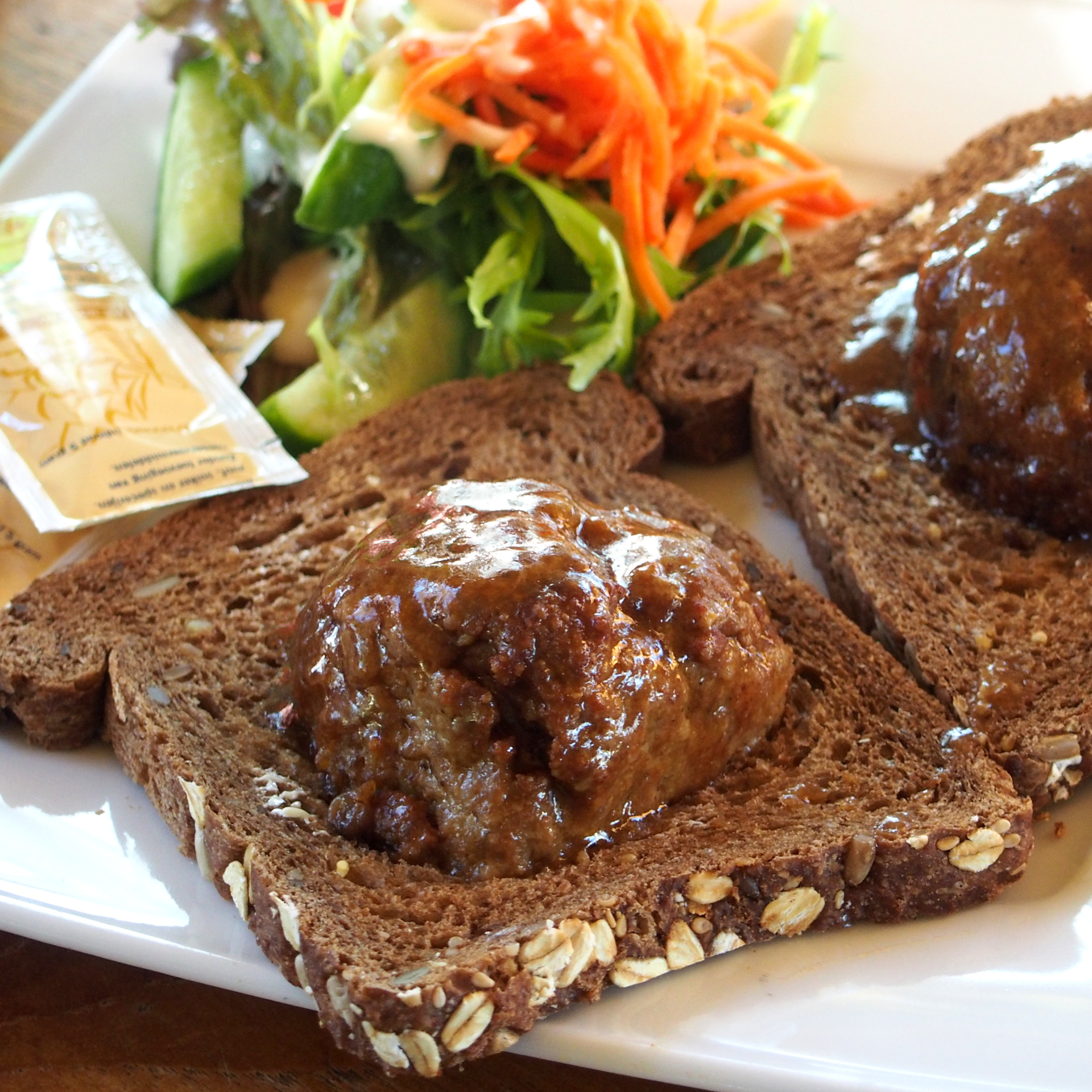
Broodje bal with gravy in the Netherlands

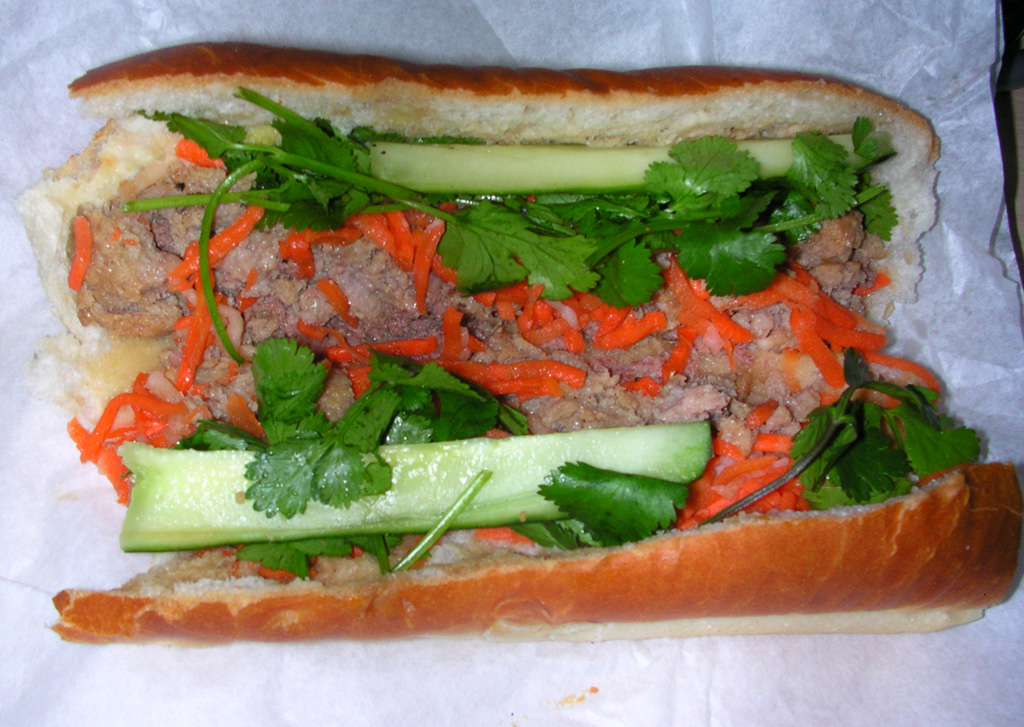
A Vietnamese-style bánh mì with meatballs

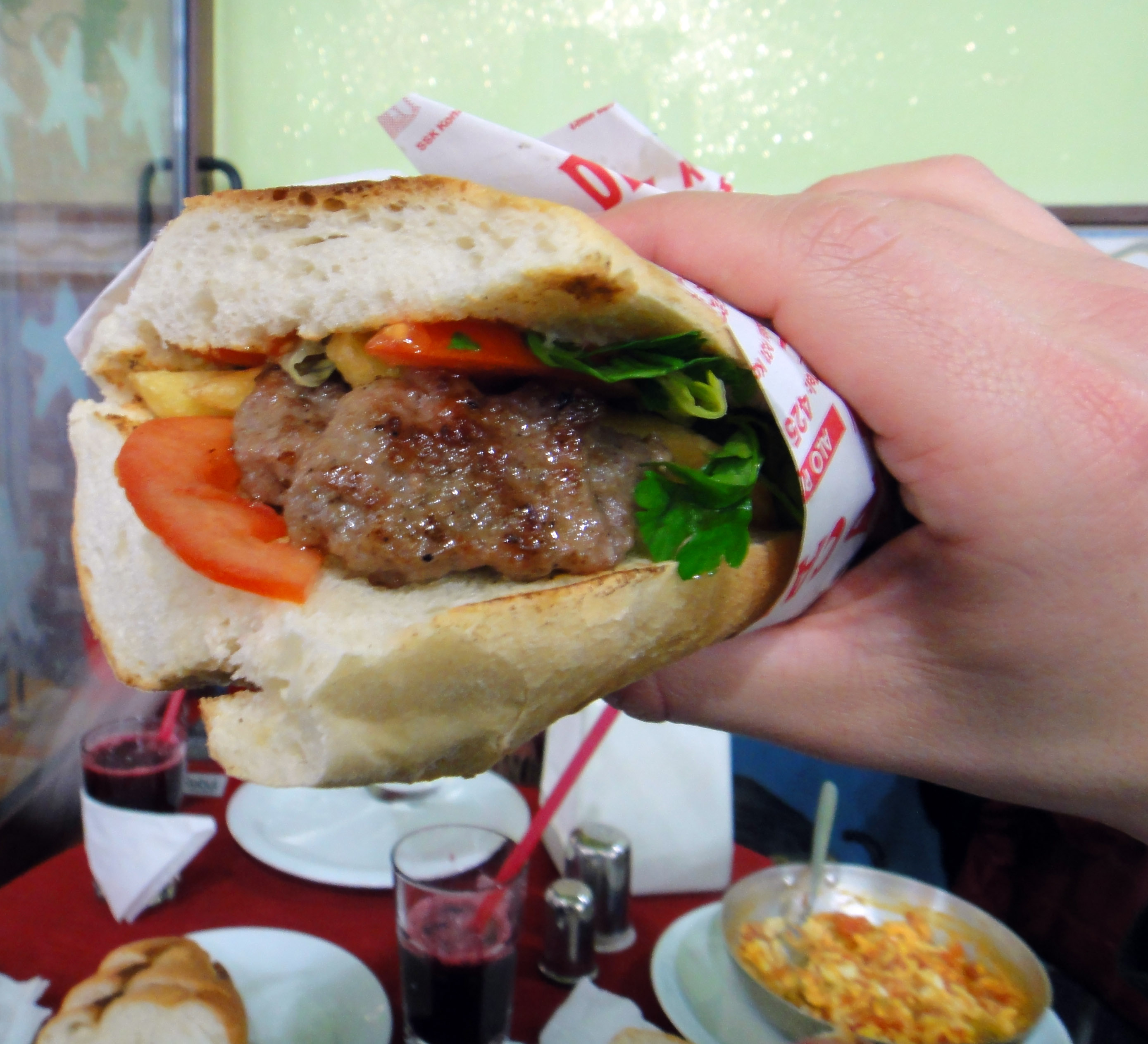
A sandwich with kofta in Turkey

== See also ==
- Italian beef sandwich
- Italian sandwich
- List of meatball dishes
- List of sandwiches
- Spaghetti and meatballs
