= Frikkadel =

South African dish

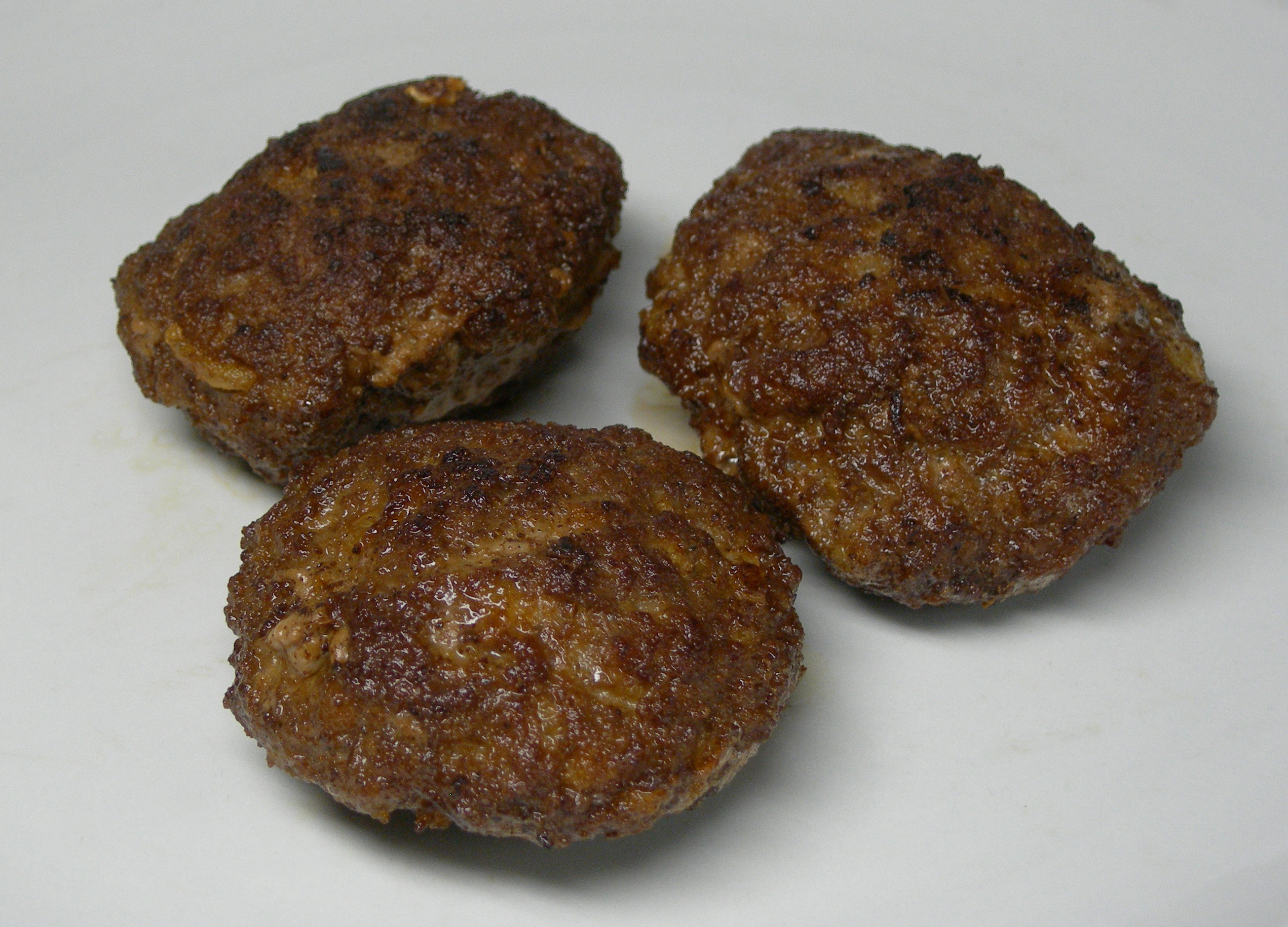
- Type: Meatball
- Place of origin: South Africa
- Serving temperature: Hot or cold
- Ingredients generally used: Onion, bread, eggs, vinegar and spices
- Similar dishes: Kofte, perkedel

Frikkadel is a traditional Afrikaner dish consisting of usually baked, but sometimes deep-fried, meatballs prepared with onion, bread, eggs, vinegar and spices. These meatballs can be served hot or cold. Many recipes have put a modern twist on this traditional recipe such as alternating chicken and lamb with the traditional beef staple. Frikkadel are also popular in Sri Lankan cuisine by way of the Burgher people.

== The Afrikaner frikkadel ==
Traditionally, frikkadels are eaten alone or with a sauce served with mashed potatoes, rice and pasta.

== Danish variant ==
The Danish frikadeller is a similar meatball, made of pork.

== See also ==
- Kofte (Persian and Indian)
- Perkedel (Indonesian)
- List of African dishes
- List of meatball dishes
