= Van köfte =

Turkish recipe for meatballs

Etli köfte
- Alternative names: Acem köftesi
- Place of origin: Van, Turkey,
- Main ingredients: Ground meat, rice, leeks, bulgur

Etli köfte or Acem köftesi is a Turkish recipe for big meatballs (köfte in Turkish) from Eastern Anatolia region of Turkey, from the city of Van. The ingredients are ground beef, rice, bulgur, yellow split peas, leeks, mint, parsley, onion and local spices.

== See also ==
- Köfte
- Tabriz meatballs
- List of meatball dishes
