= Beef ball =

Cantonese traditional beef dish

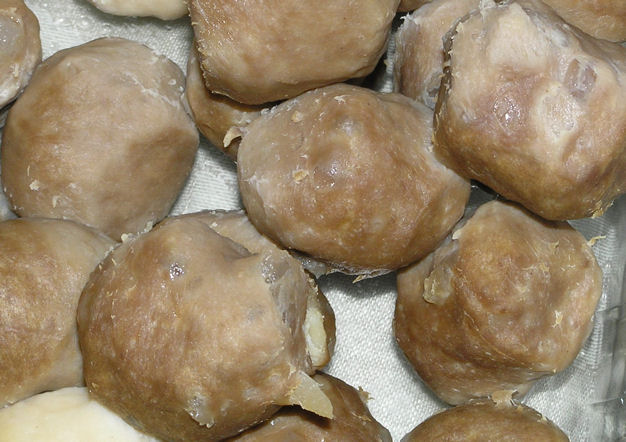
- Pre-cooked beef balls
- Chinese: 牛丸
- Hanyu Pinyin: niúwán
- Cantonese Yale: ngàuyún
- Literal meaning: beef ball
Transcriptions
Standard Mandarin
- Hanyu Pinyin: niúwán
- Bopomofo: ㄋㄧㄡˊ ㄨㄢˊ
- IPA: [njǒu wǎn]
Yue: Cantonese
- Yale Romanization: ngàuyún
- Jyutping: ngau4jyun2
- Sidney Lau: ngau4yuen2
- IPA: [ŋɐ̏u y̌ːn]
Southern Min
- Hokkien POJ: gû-uân

A beef ball (Chinese: 牛丸; pinyin: Niúwán) is a common food in Cantonese and overseas Chinese communities and originated from the Teochew people. Beef balls are made of pulverized beef and are similar in form and preparation to fish balls, but with a darker color.

== Production ==
Nearly all meatballs (made from pork, beef, fish, or other animal flesh) made in Asia differ significantly in texture to their European counterparts. Instead of mincing the meat, which is done for meatballs of European origin, cooks pound the meat until it is pulverized. This process results in a smooth texture. Pounding, unlike mincing, uncoils and stretches previously wound protein strands in meat and allows them to cure to a gel with heat in a similar manner as surimi. This technique is also often used for meat fillings in steamed dishes.

After the meat is prepared, it is divided into balls, seasoned, and boiled in water. With prolonged cooking, the tiny pieces of tendon from the meat in the balls will dissolve. The result is meatballs with a tender, bouncy texture.

== Hong Kong ==
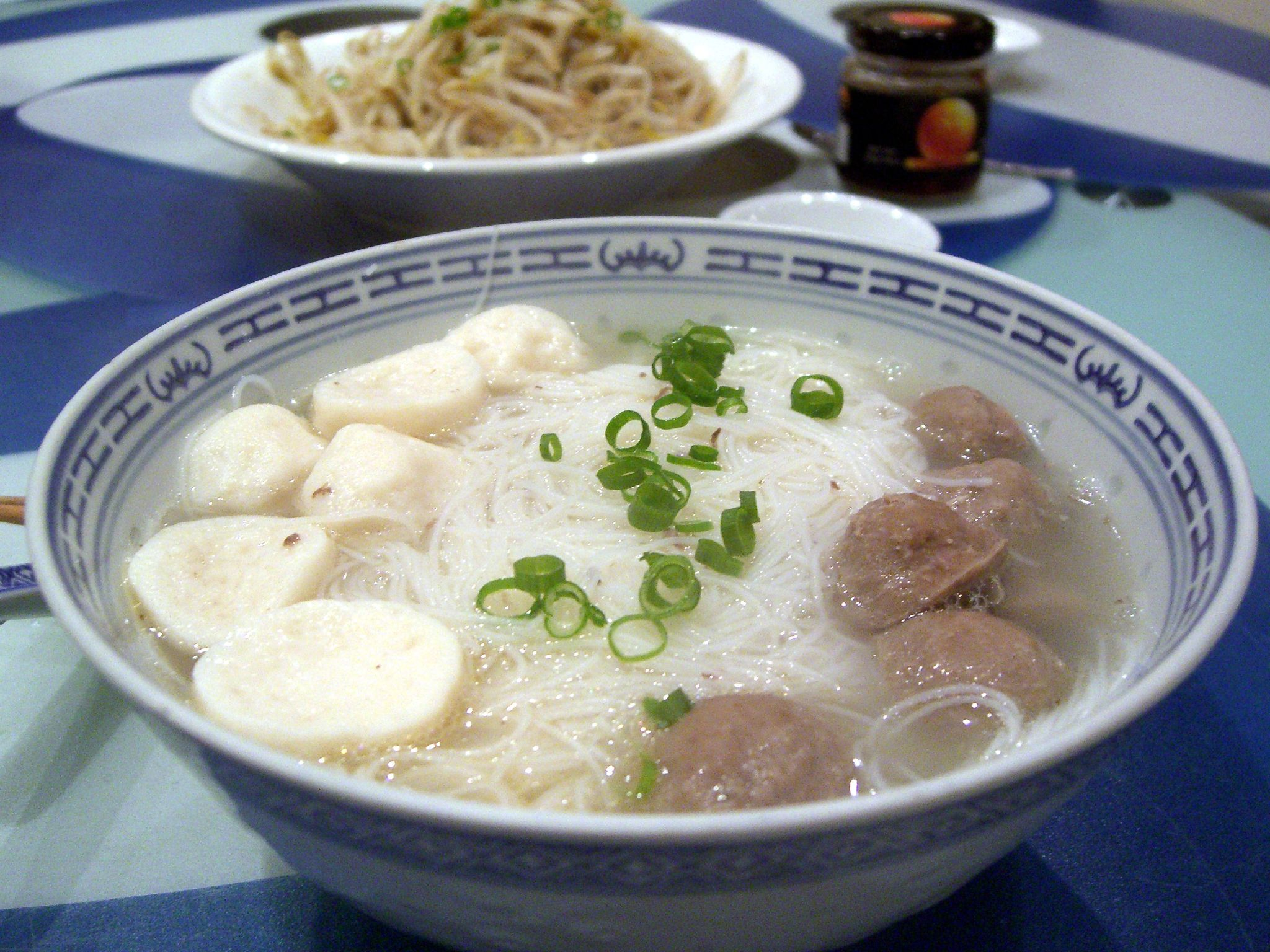
Rice vermicelli with fish balls and beef balls

Beef balls are commonly mixed in with wonton noodles and other fish ball noodles. It is available in traditional markets and supermarkets. Beef balls are also a popular ingredient for hot pot dishes. It has a variety of uses within Chinese cuisine.

Some Hong Kong grocery stores and markets have controversially been found to sell beef balls that contain other kinds of ground meat, such as pork and chicken. This discovery raised concerns for religious customers who cannot eat pork.

== See also ==
- Bakso
- List of meatball dishes
- Steamed meatball
