= List of meatball dishes =

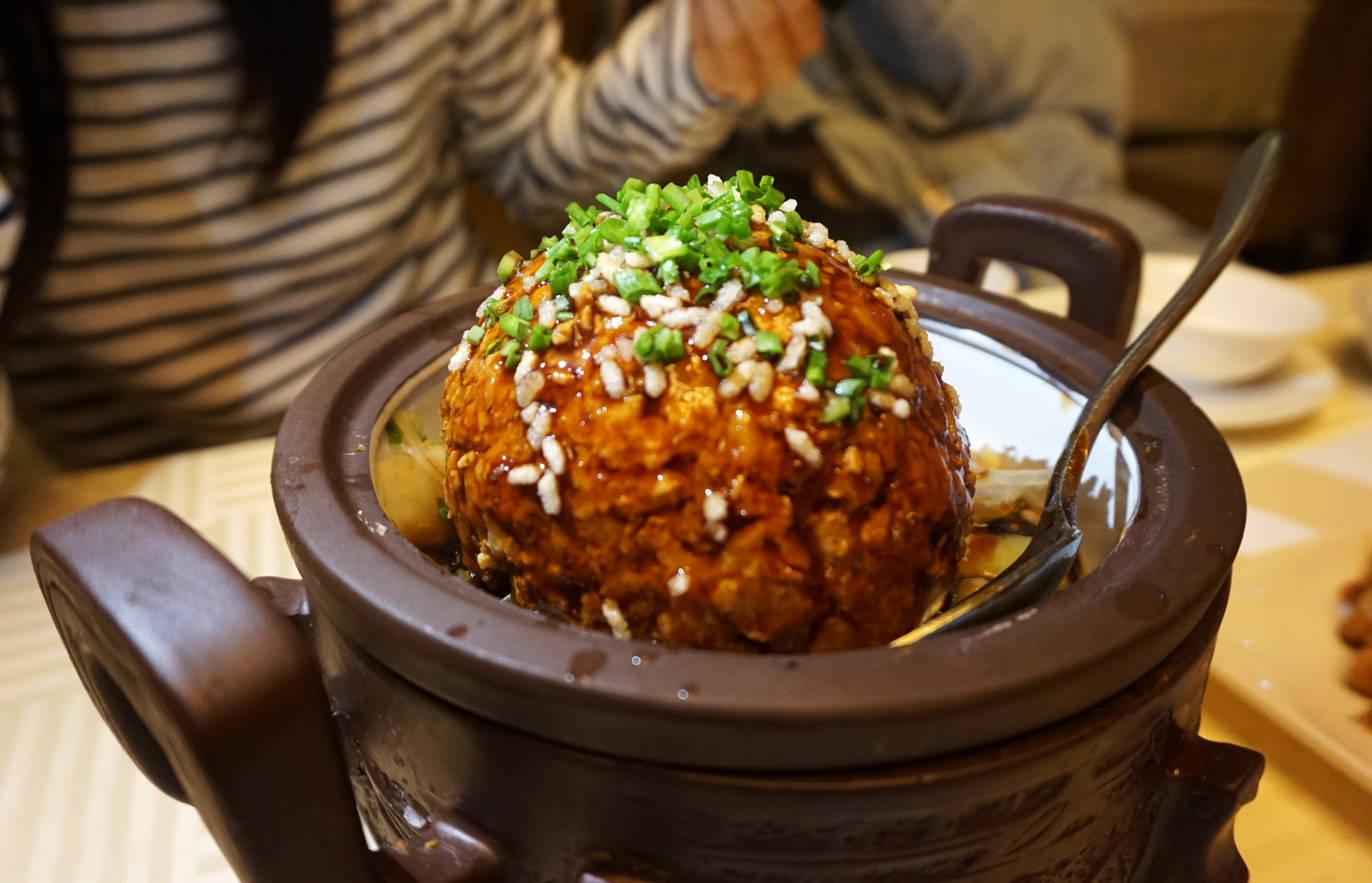
Lion's Head is a dish from the Huaiyang cuisine of eastern China, consisting of large pork meatballs stewed with vegetables.

A meatball is ground or minced meat rolled into a small ball, sometimes along with other ingredients, such as bread crumbs, minced onion, eggs, butter, and seasoning. Meatballs are cooked by frying, baking, steaming, or braising in sauce. There are many types of meatballs using different types of meats and spices, and most cuisines have a version of the dish.

== Meatball dishes ==
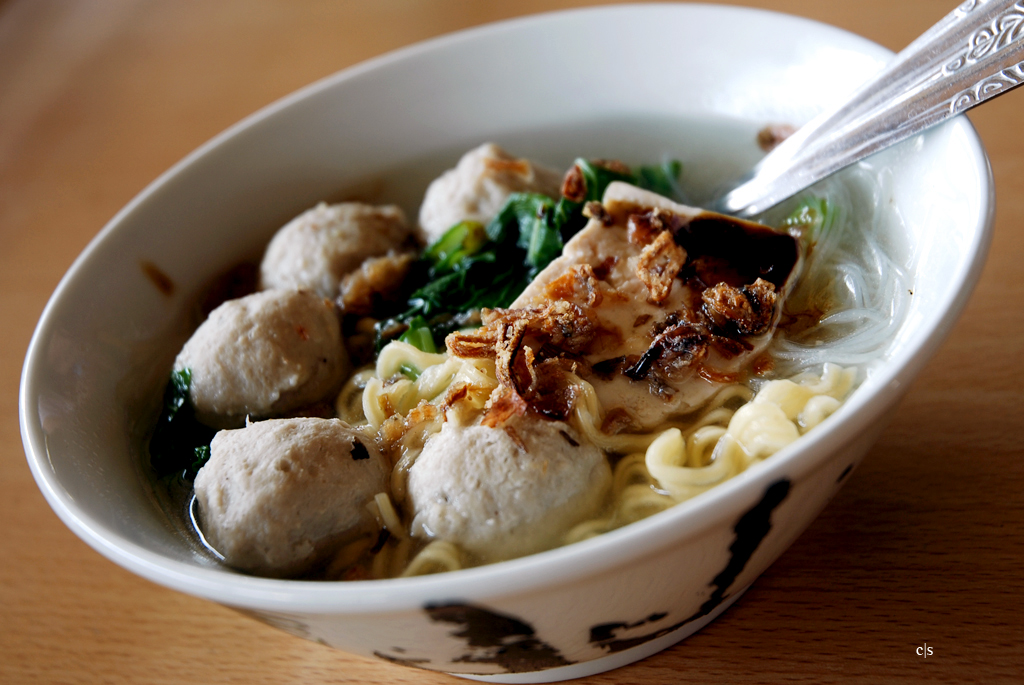
Bakso sapi

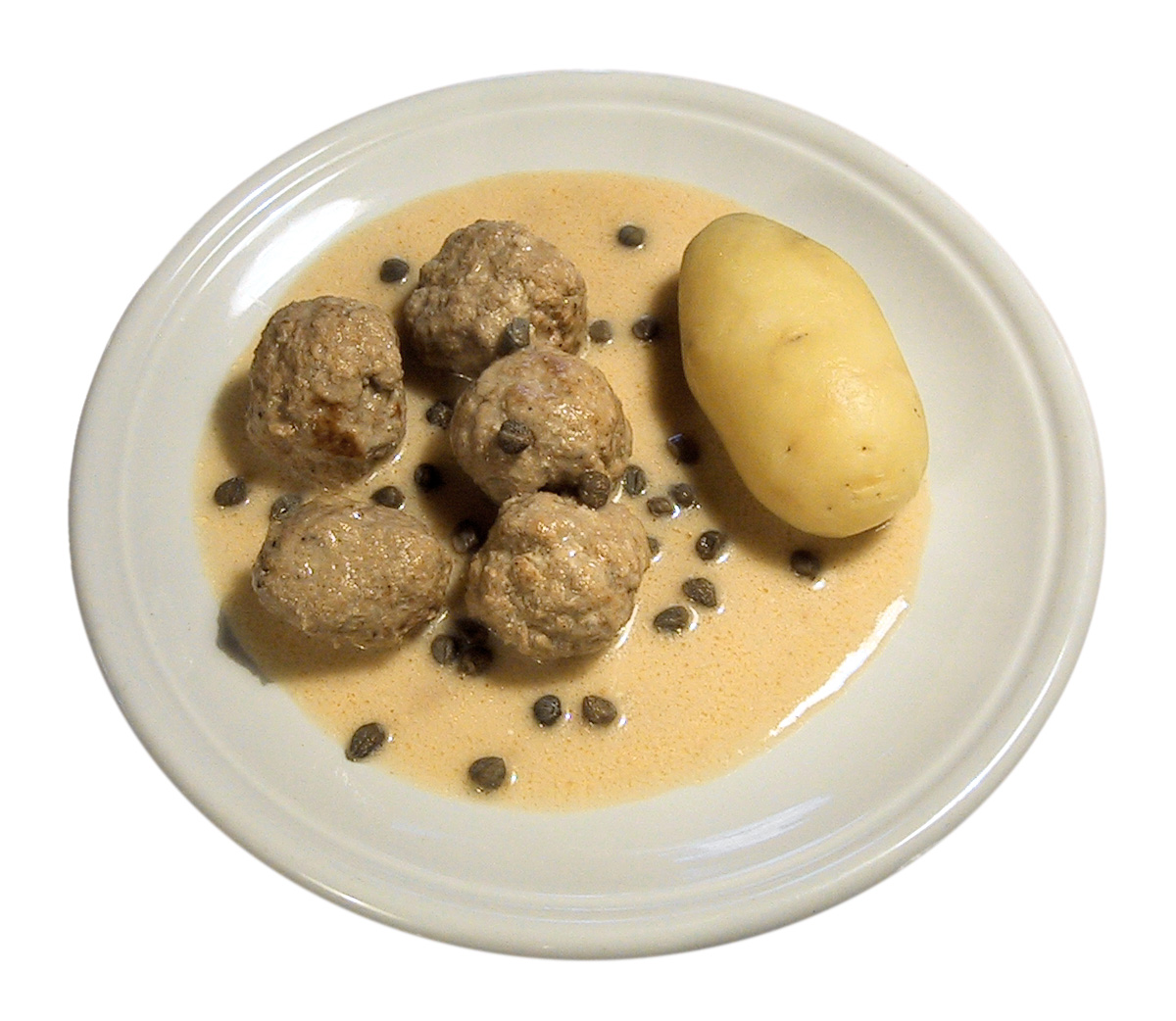
Königsberger Klopse

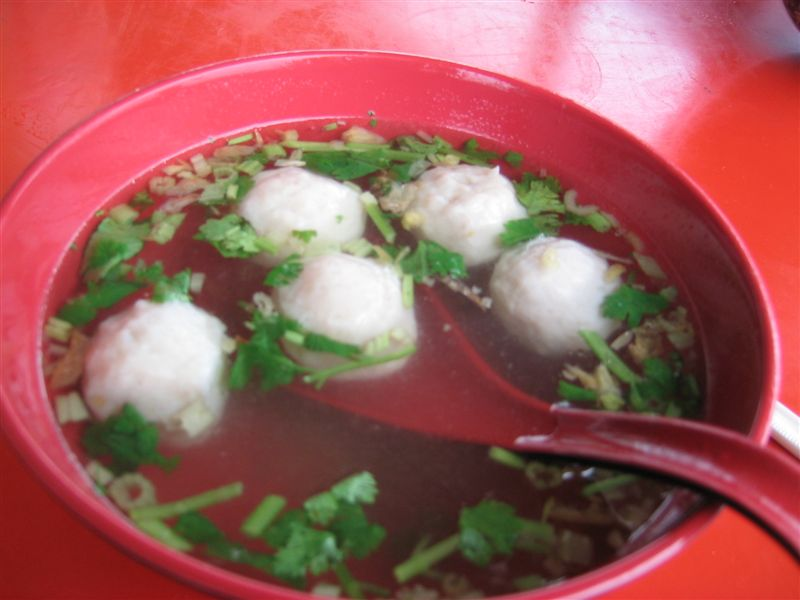
Pork ball soup

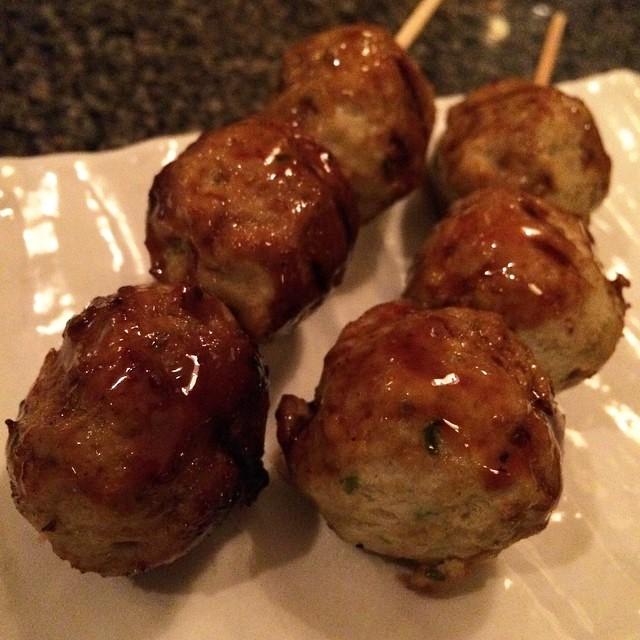
Tsukune, Japanese chicken meatballs

- Bakso – an Indonesian meatball or meat paste made from beef surimi.
- Bakso Bakar Malang – Roasted Bakso dish from Malang City, Indonesia. Usually served with spicy sauce.
- Beef ball
- Chiftele
- Faggot – a dish in the United Kingdom typically consisting of minced pork liver and heart, wrapped in bacon, with onion and breadcrumbs. It is often cooked in a crock with gravy and served with peas and mashed potatoes. Faggots can also be made with beef.
- Fish ball
- Frikadeller – flat, pan-fried meatballs of minced meat, often likened to the Danish version of meatballs. The origin of the dish is unknown but the dish is most often associated with Danish cuisine specifically, or Scandinavian cuisine in general.
- Frikkadel – a traditional Afrikaans dish comprising usually baked, but sometimes deep-fried, meatballs prepared with onion, bread, eggs, vinegar and spices.
- Gondi – a Persian Jewish dish of meatballs made from ground lamb, veal or chicken traditionally served on Shabbat.
- Kibbeh – a Levantine dish made of bulgur (cracked wheat), minced onions, and finely ground lean beef, lamb, goat, or camel meat with Middle Eastern spices (cinnamon, nutmeg, clove, allspice). Some types of kibbeh are shaped into balls or patties, and baked, cooked in broth, or served raw. Kibbeh is considered to be the national dish of many Middle Eastern countries.
- Klopsiki – a Polish meatball dish often prepared using tomato sauce (Note: "Klopsiki: This is the traditional meatball, ranging in size from that of a small walnut to that of a small apple. It is rarely perfectly round, as it gets slightly flattened with the spatula during browning.")
- Königsberger Klopse – a German specialty of meatballs in a white sauce with capers
- Kotlet mielony – a Polish dish consisting of minced meat cutlet with eggs, bread crumbs, garlic, and salt and pepper rolled into a ball and fried with onions and butter.
- Köttbullar – Swedish meatballs that are typically prepared with ground pork or a meat mix, diced onion, breadcrumbs and broth. Cream is sometimes used.
- Leberknödel – a traditional dish of German, Austrian and Czech cuisines. It is usually composed of beef liver, although in the German Palatinate region pork is used instead. The meat is ground and mixed with bread, eggs, parsley and various spices, often nutmeg or marjoram. In Austria spleen is often mixed with the liver in a 1/3 ratio.
- Lion's Head – a stewed Chinese meatball mixed with vegetables, from the Huaiyang cuisine of eastern China. There are two varieties: white (or plain), and red (红烧, cooked with soy sauce).
- Meatball pizza
- Meatball sandwich
- Meatball soup
- Meatballs with cuttlefish – a traditional Catalan dish of meatballs with cuttlefish, these two elements are fused together in one of the many dishes of the Catalan version of surf'n'turf.
- Mititei – a traditional Romanian dish of grilled ground meat rolls made from a mixture of beef, lamb and pork with spices, such as garlic, black pepper, thyme, coriander, anise, savory, and sometimes a touch of paprika. Sodium bicarbonate and broth or water are also added to the mixture.
- Mondeghili
- Nem nguội – Vietnamese meatballs that are a variation of the Nem nướng meatballs. They are small and rectangular in shape, and stuffed with vermicelli. The reddish meat is covered with peppers and typically a chili pepper. Very spicy, they are eaten almost exclusively as a cocktail snack.
- Nem nướng – (literally "grilled sausage") Vietnamese grilled pork sausage or grilled meatballs
- Pârjoale
- Pearl meatballs - Chinese meatballs made of pork and coated in glutinous rice
- Pentol – a dish in Surabaya, Indonesia that can be prepared as vegetarian or with meat
- Perișoare
- Porcupines – ground-beef meatball, ingredients including chopped onions and long-grain rice. When cooked (traditionally in canned tomato soup) the rice projects from the meatball, creating the porcupine-look.
- Pork ball
- Poume d'oranges
- Skilpadjies – a traditional South African food consisting of lamb's liver wrapped in netvet (caul fat), which is the fatty membrane that surrounds the kidneys. Most cooks mince the liver, add coriander, chopped onion, salt and Worcestershire sauce then wrap balls of this mixture with the netvet and secure it with a toothpick. The balls, approximately 80 mm (3.1 in) in diameter, are normally barbecued (grilled over an open fire) and ready when the fat is crisp.
- Spaghetti with meatballs
- Steamed meatball – a common Cantonese dim sum dish
- Tsukune – Japanese chicken meatballs most often cooked yakitori style, but also can be fried or baked

=== Middle East and South Asia ===
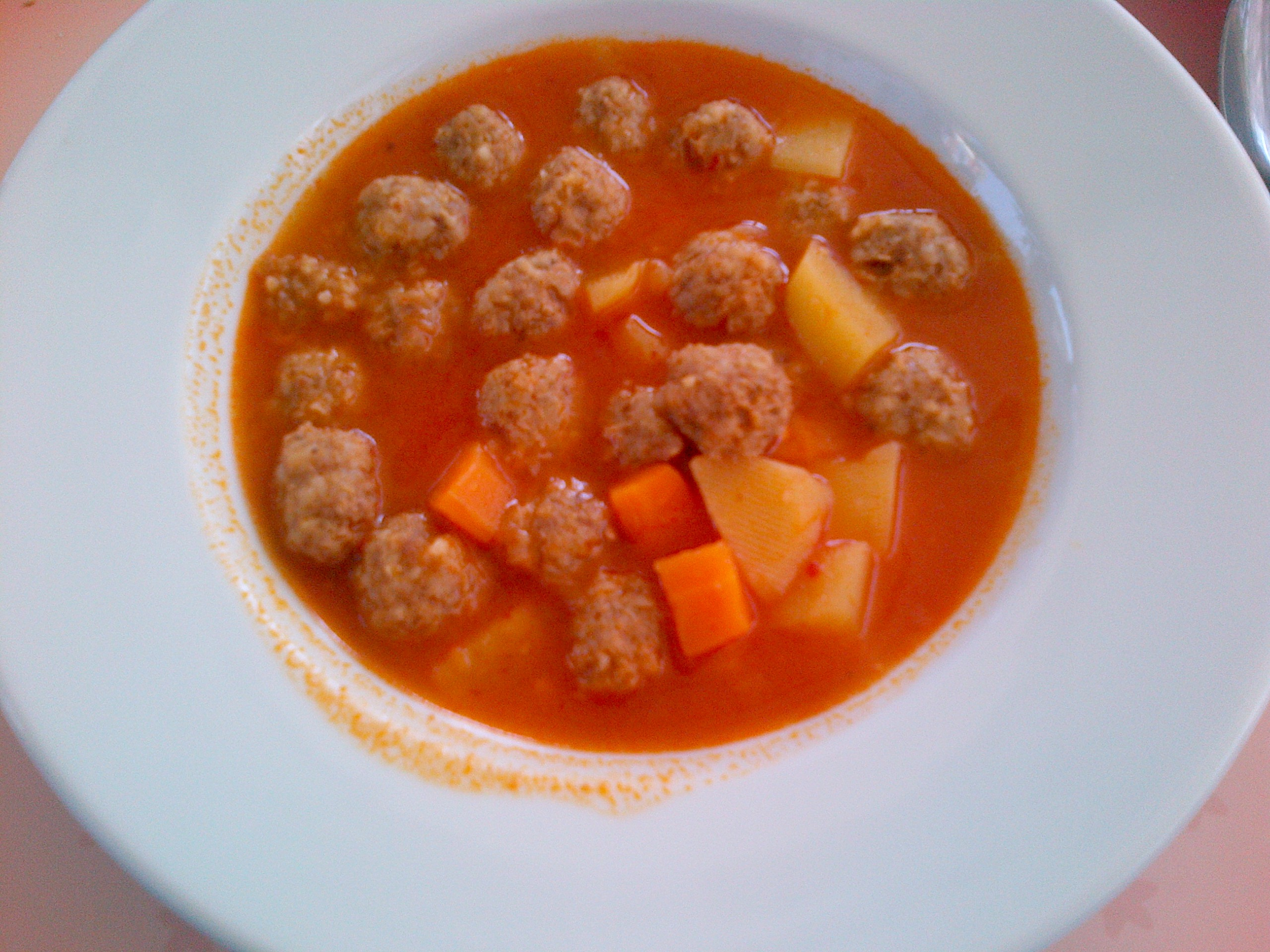
Sulu köfte

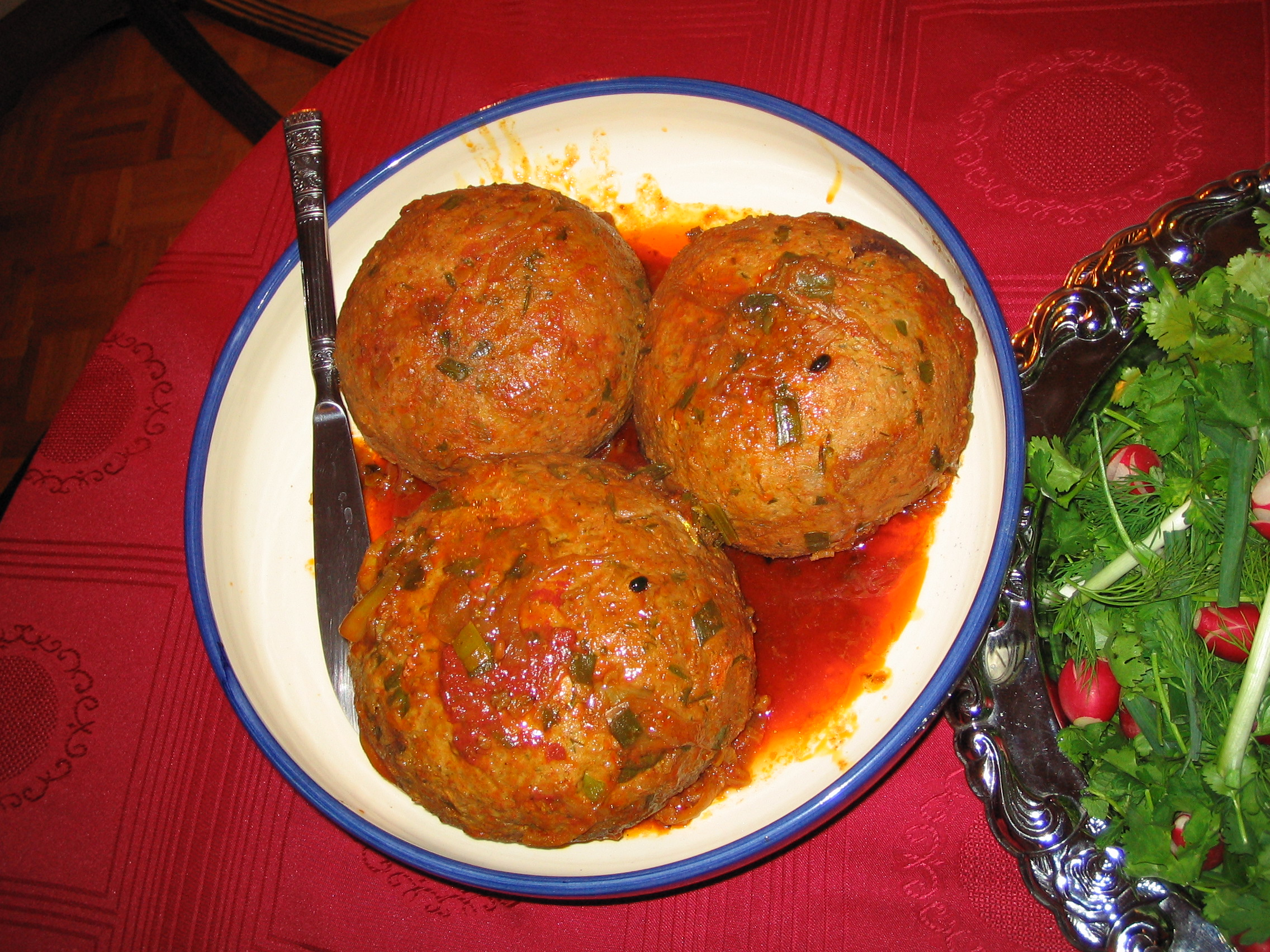
Tabriz meatballs

Köfte is a family of meatball or meatloaf dishes found in South Asian, Middle Eastern, Balkan, and Central Asian cuisine. In the simplest form, koftas consist of balls of minced or ground meat—usually beef, chicken, lamb, or pork—mixed with spices or onions. In Turkey, meatballs are named after the places where they are respectively produced.

- Akçaabat meatballs – found traditionally in Akçaabat, Trabzon, Turkey
- Çiğ köfte – a raw meatball dish in Armenian, Kurdish, and Turkish cuisines
- Dry meatballs
- Harput meatballs, large meatballs from Elazığ (formerly Harput), Turkey
- İnegöl meatballs, grilled meatballs from İnegöl, Turkey
- Islama köfte, grilled meatballs with toast from Adapazarı, Turkey
- Şiş köfte – a köfte or kebab variant in the Turkish cuisine. It consists of minced lamb, mutton, veal or beef, or a mixture of some of these meats with herbs, often including parsley and mint, on a şiş (skewer), grilled.
- Smyrna meatballs, also called soutzoukakia Smyrneika (σουτζουκάκια σμυρνέικα) or İzmir köfte: elongated meatballs in spicy sauce
- Sulu köfte – a Turkish stew or thick soup (çorba) with köfte
- Tabriz meatballs (koofteh Tabrizi) – an Iranian stuffed meatball dish from Tabriz
- Tire meatballs – thin grilled meatballs with butter from Tire, İzmir, Turkey
- Van köfte, large meatballs from Van, Turkey
- Yuvarlakia – a Greek meatball made of beef and rice or bulgur and cooked in moist heat, served in egg-lemon sauce

== Gallery ==
Meatball dishes around the world

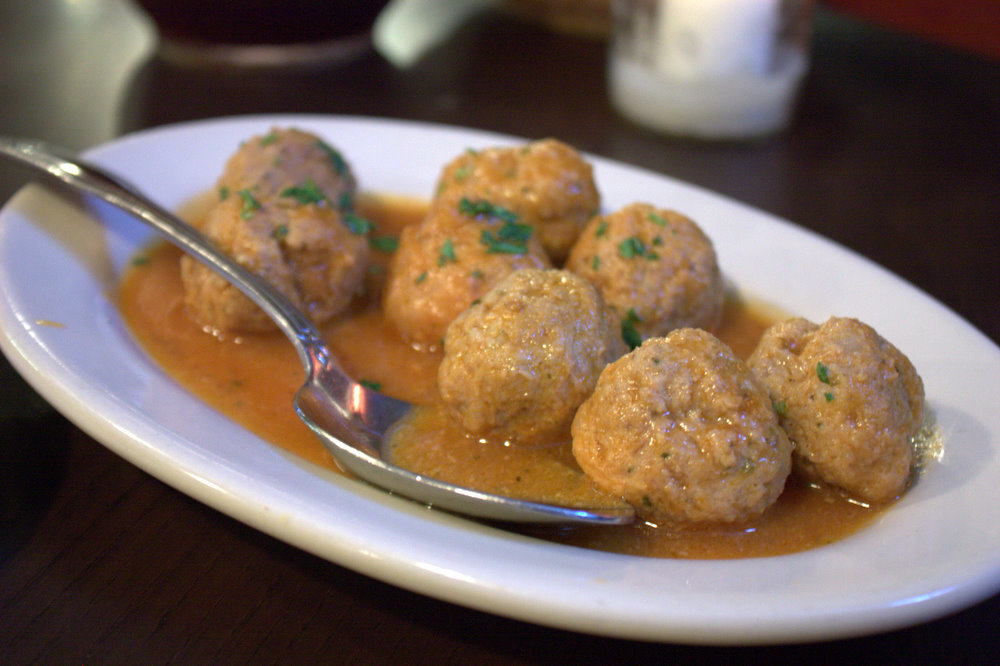
Albondigas are small meatballs prepared in the cuisines of Mexico, Spain and South America. Pictured is albondigas in Spain.

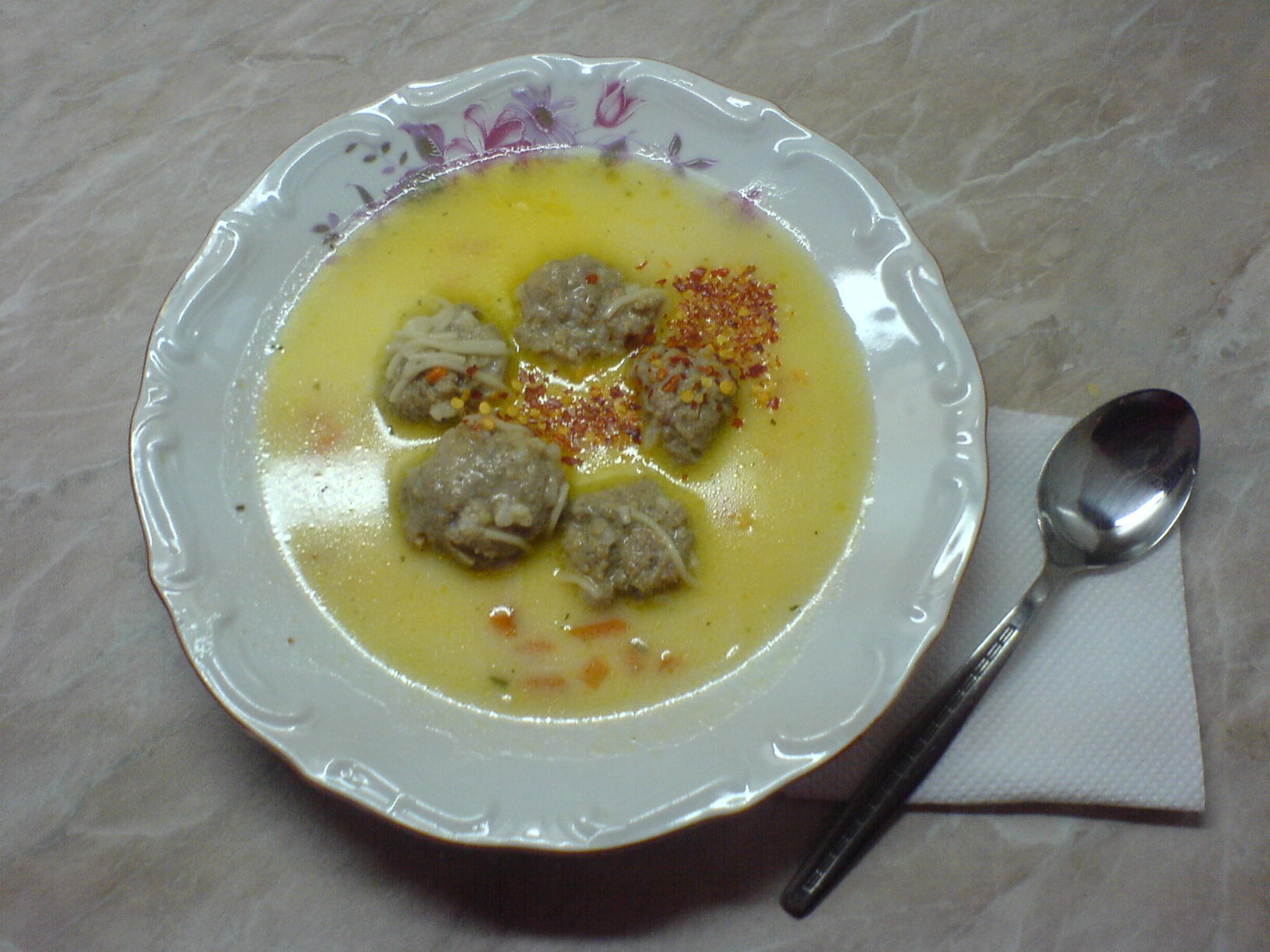
Bulgarian meatball soup

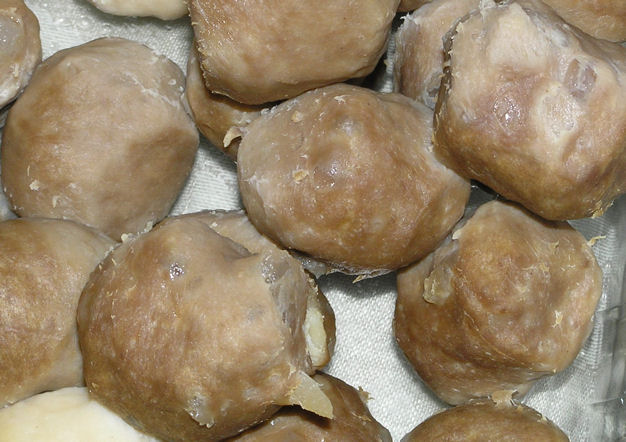
Precooked beef balls

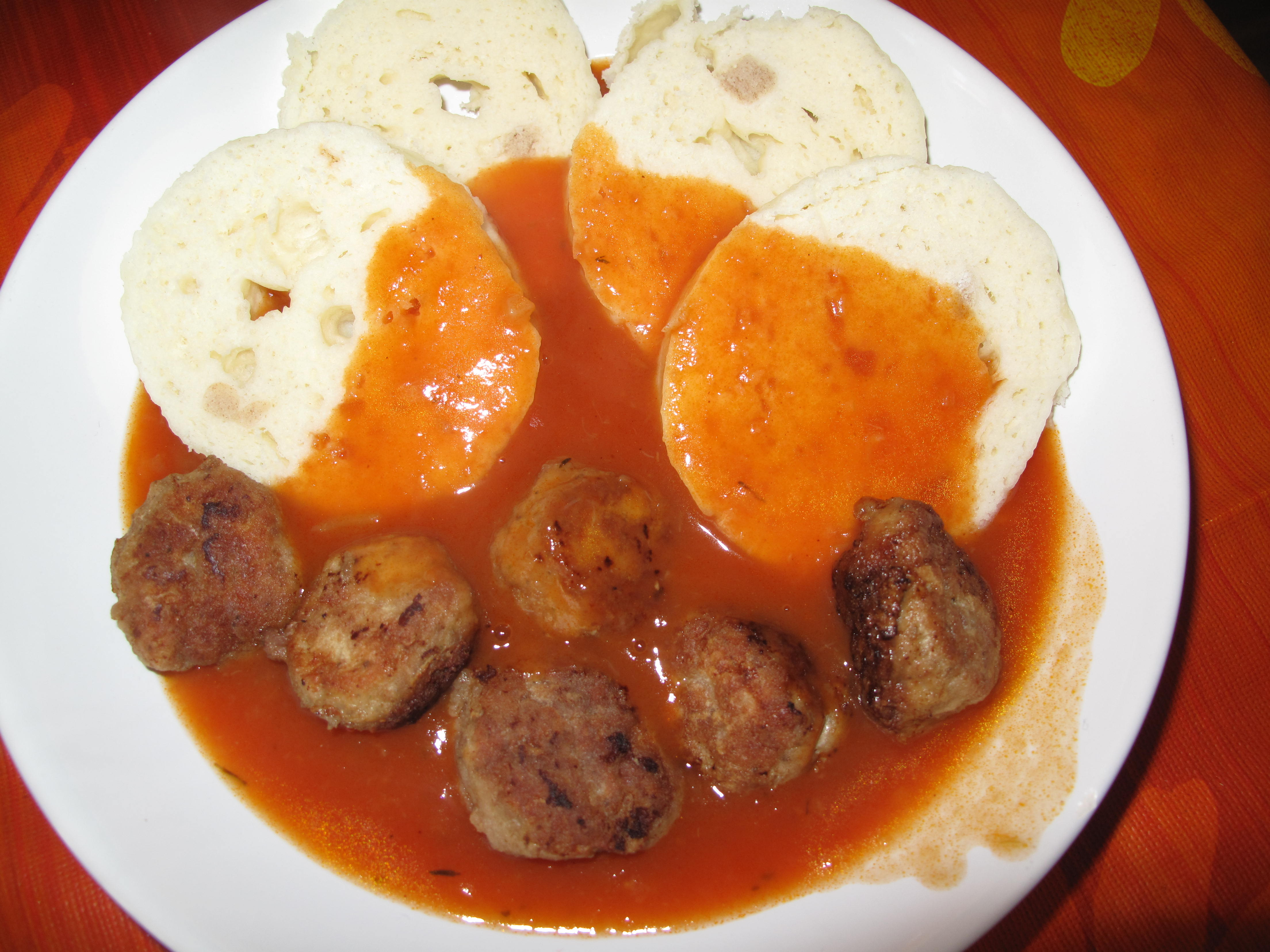
Meatballs with tomato sauce and bread dumplings in the Czech Republic

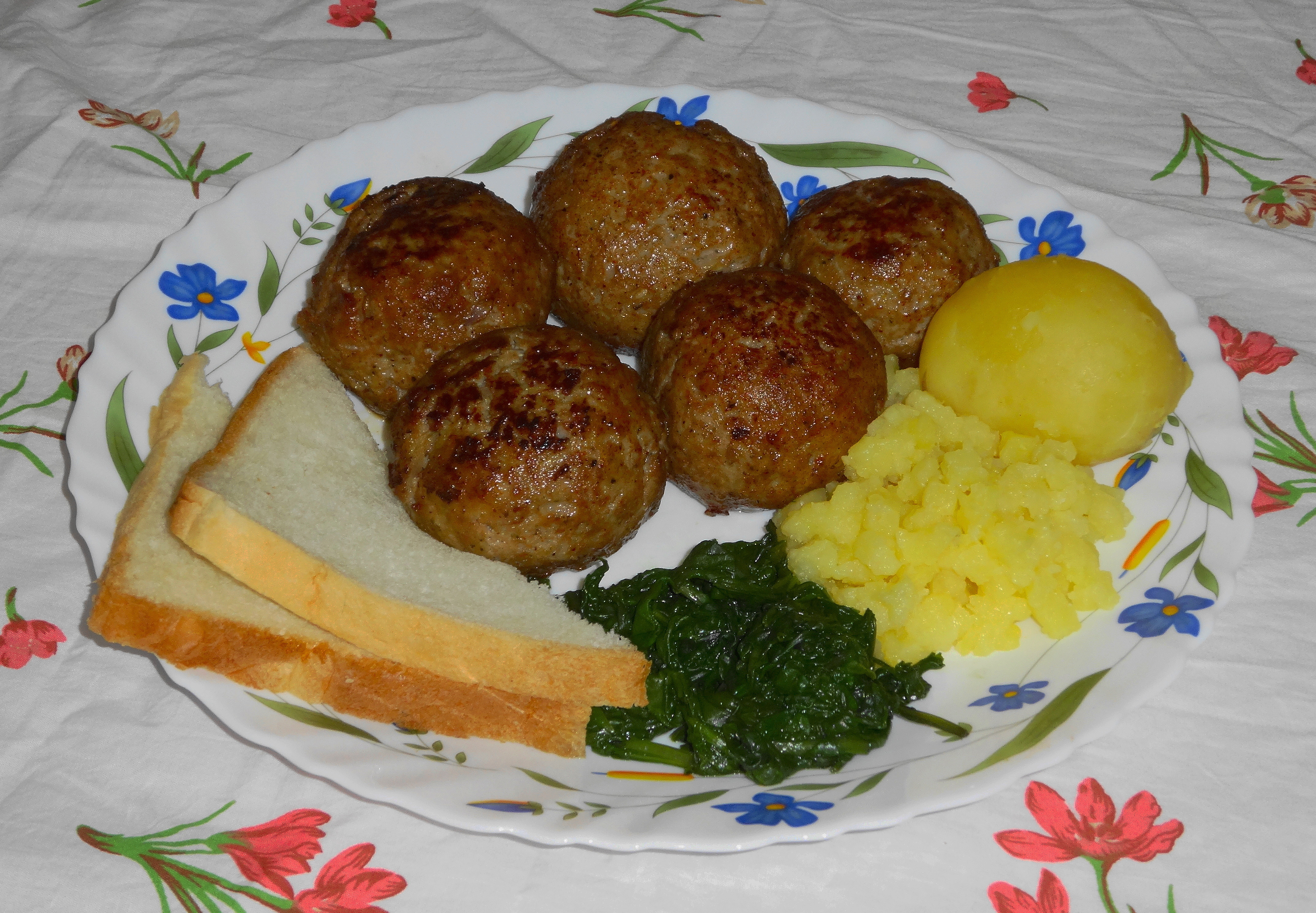
Dutch gehaktballen

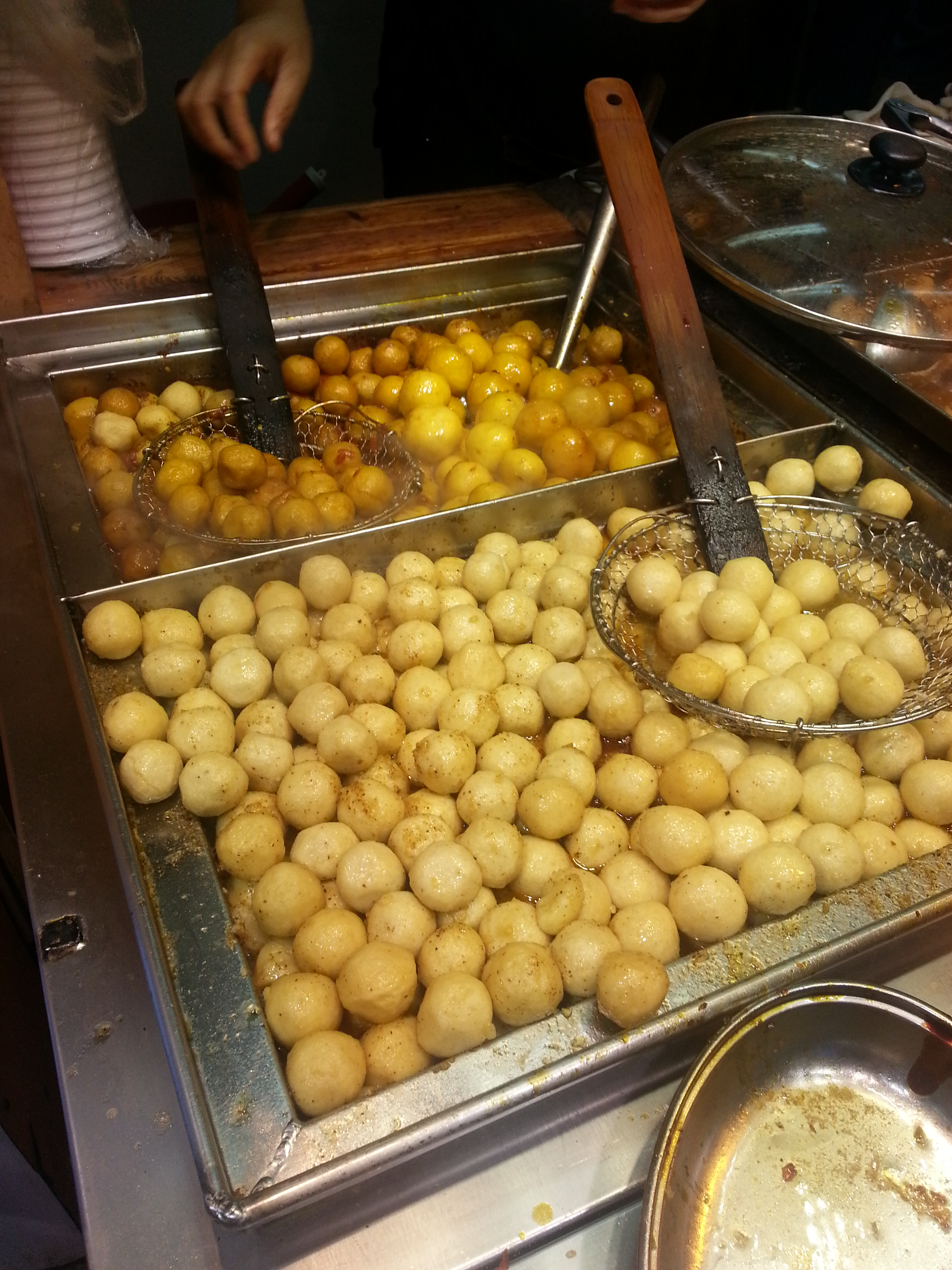
Fish balls

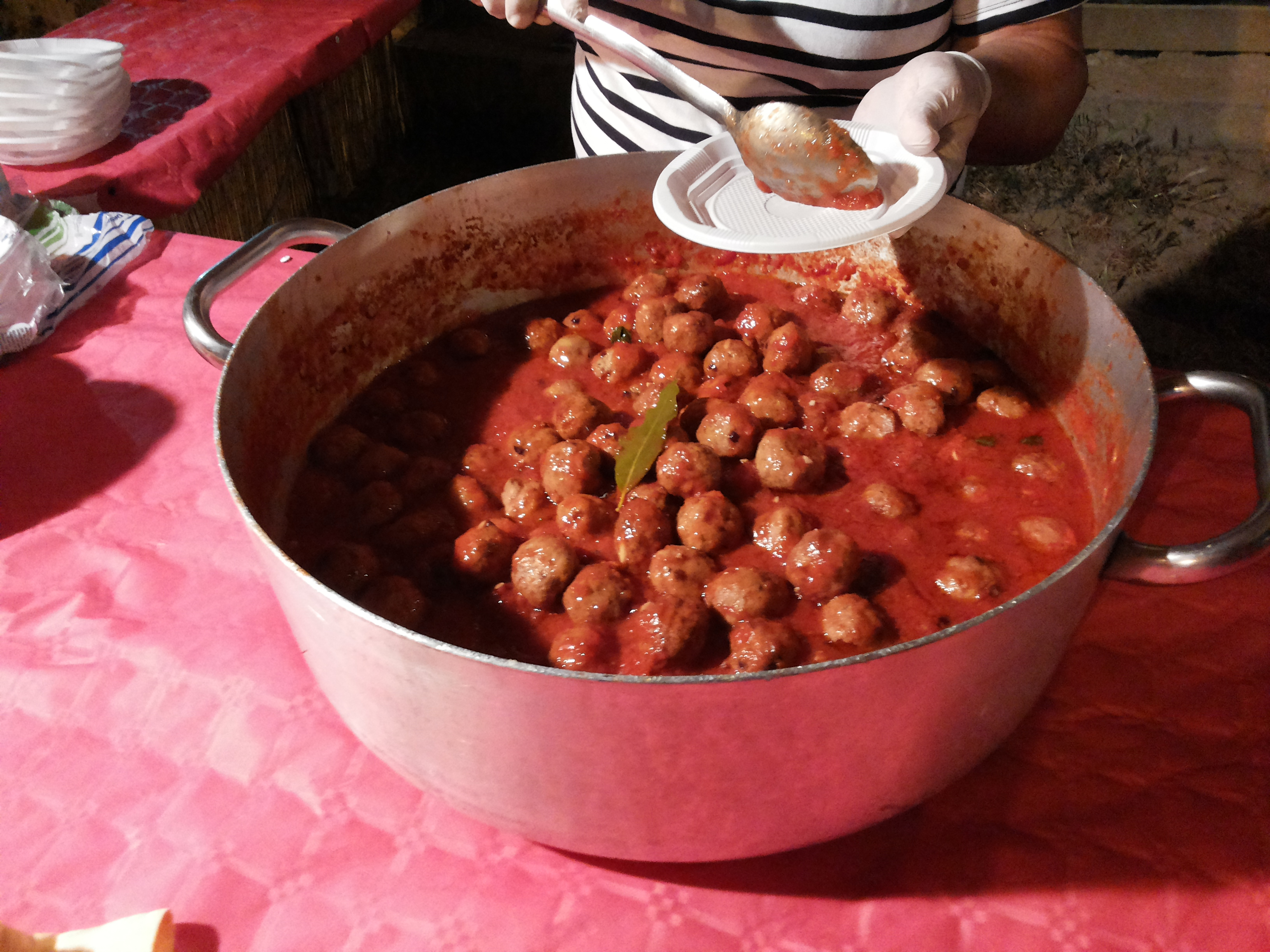
Fish balls at a restaurant in Italy

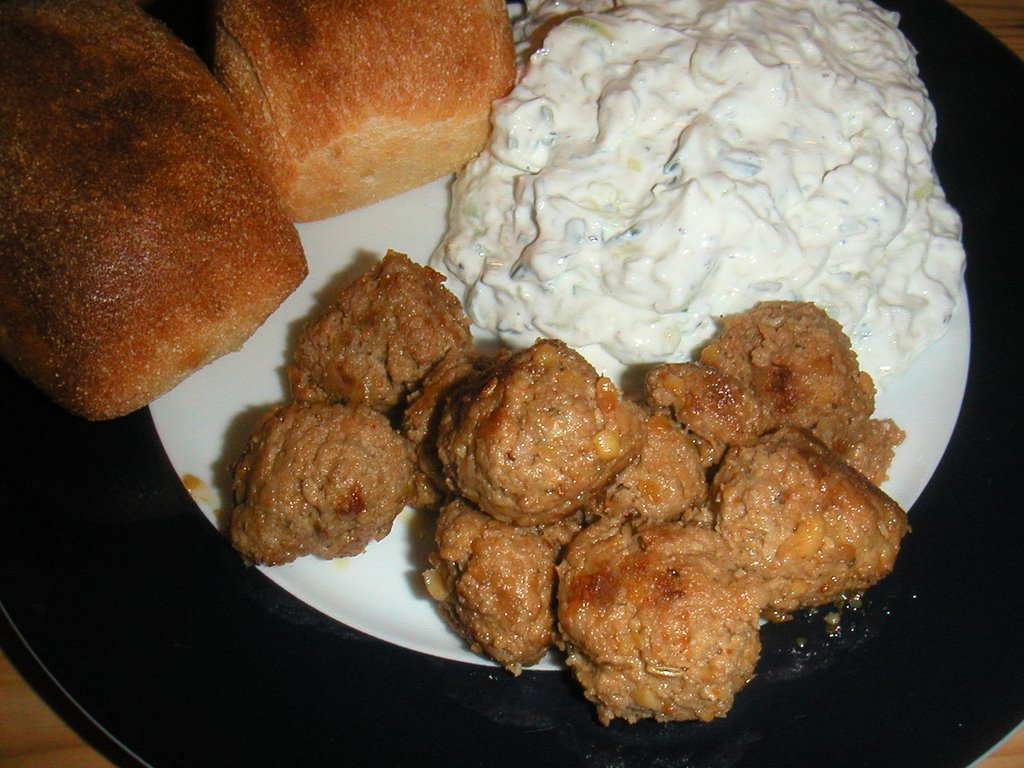
Danish frikadelle accompanied with bread and tzatziki

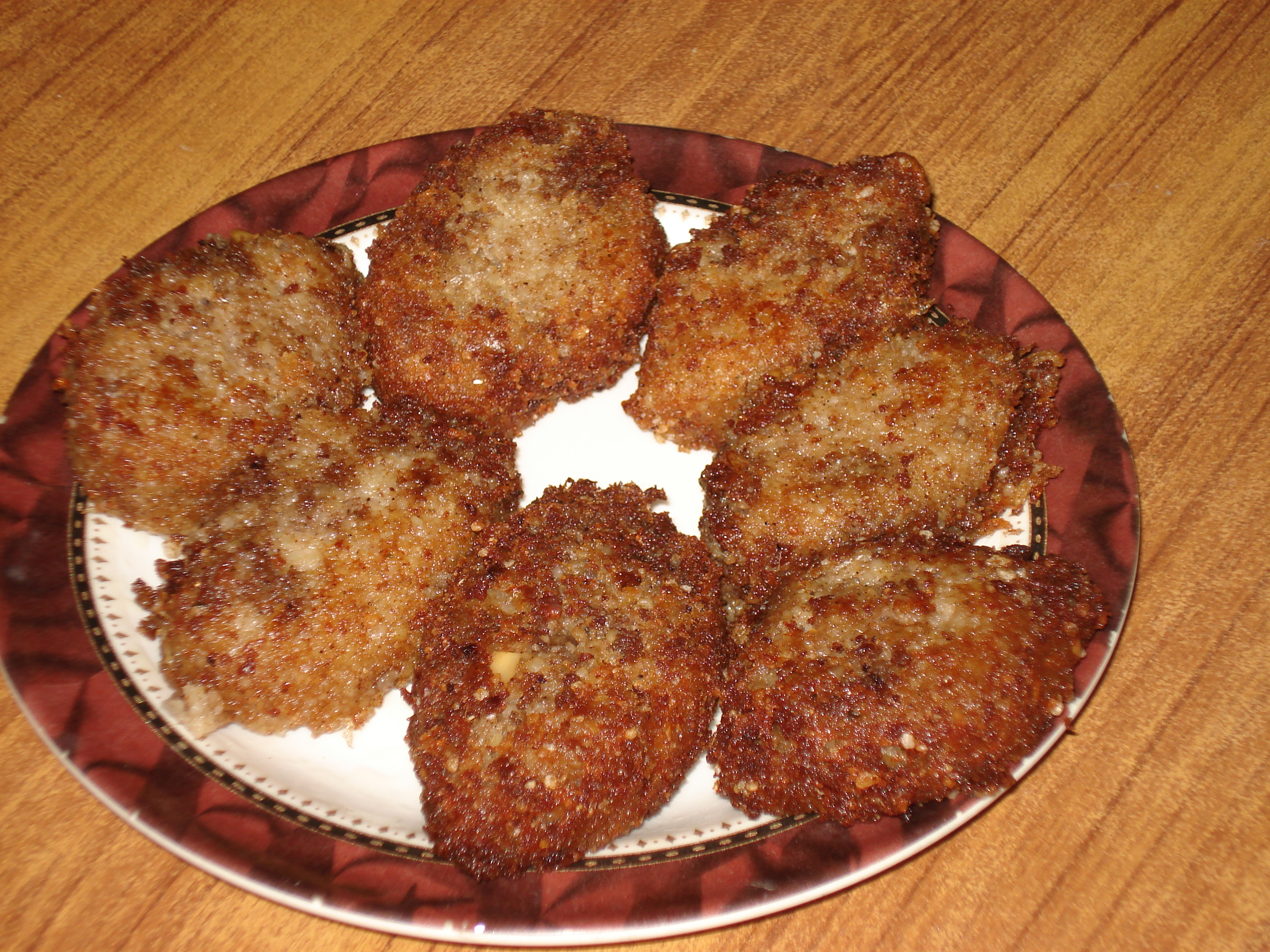
Fried kibbeh

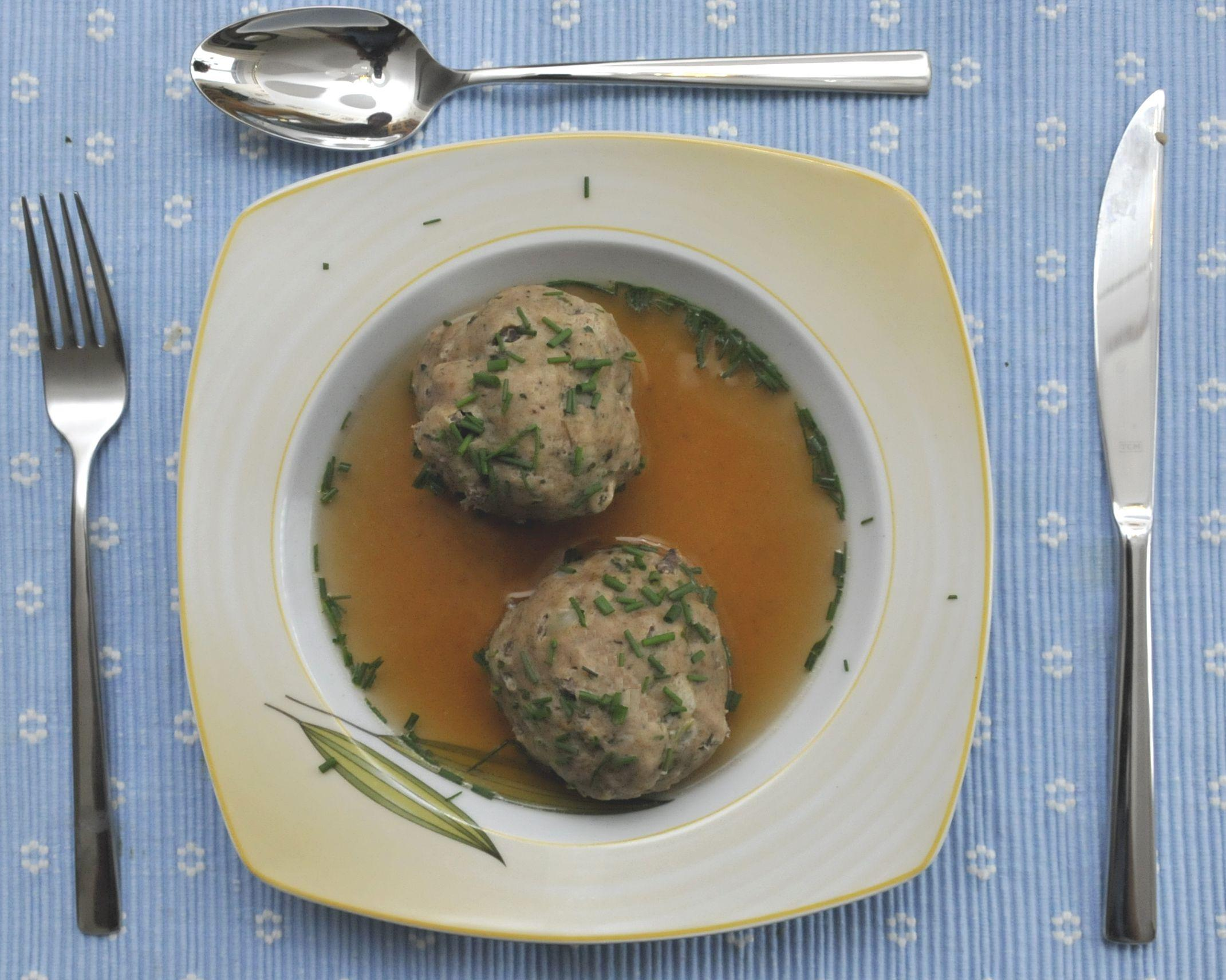
A leberknödel soup

Meatball pizza

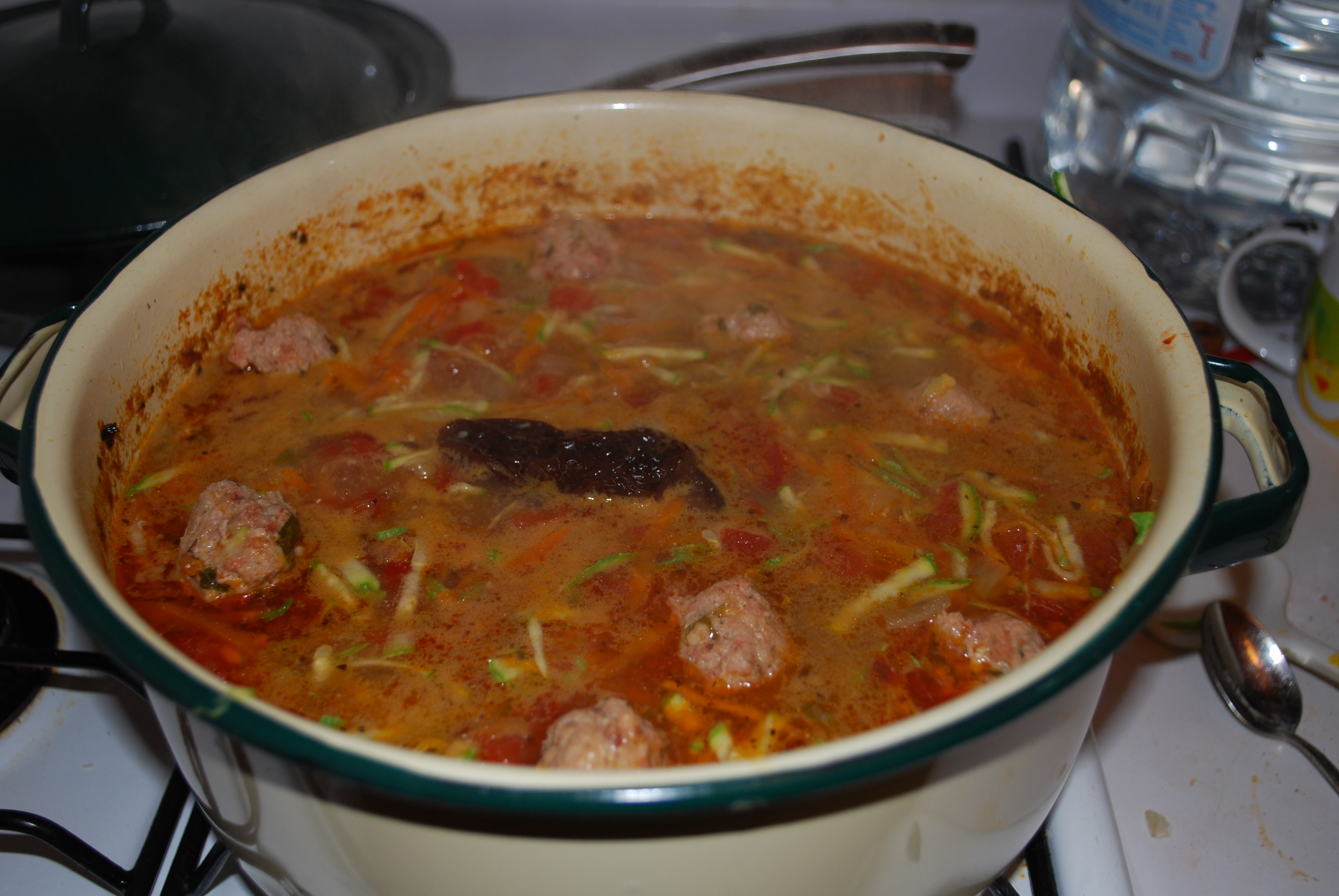
Mexican meatball soup simmering on a stove

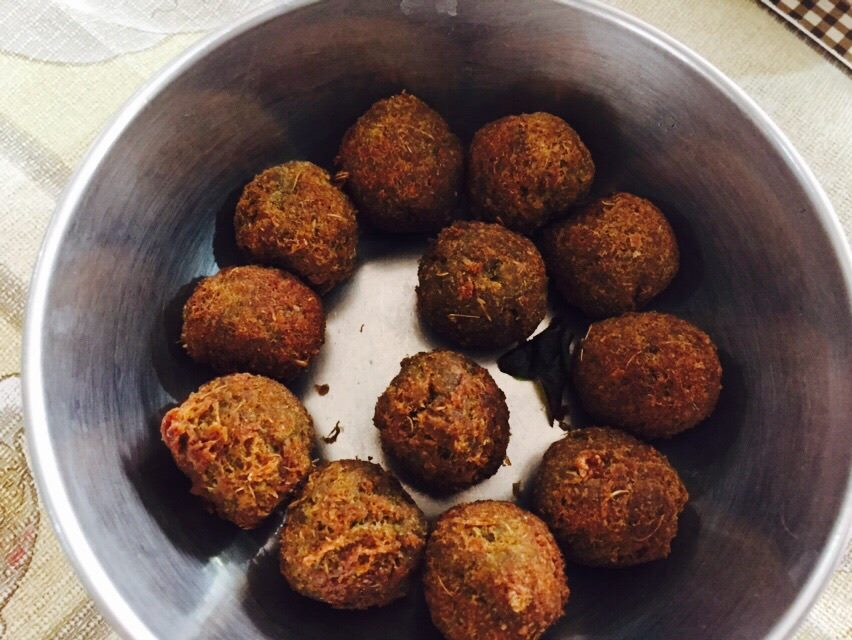
Mutton meatballs in India

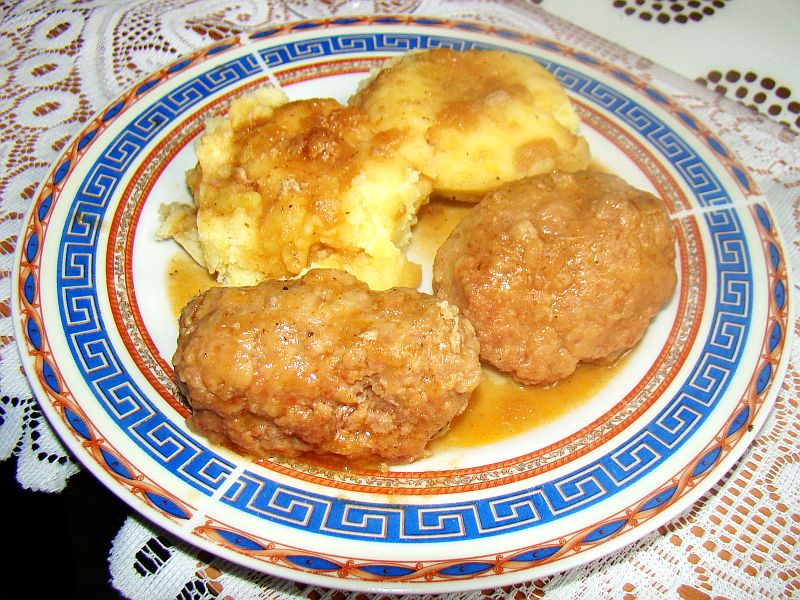
Polish kotlet mielony

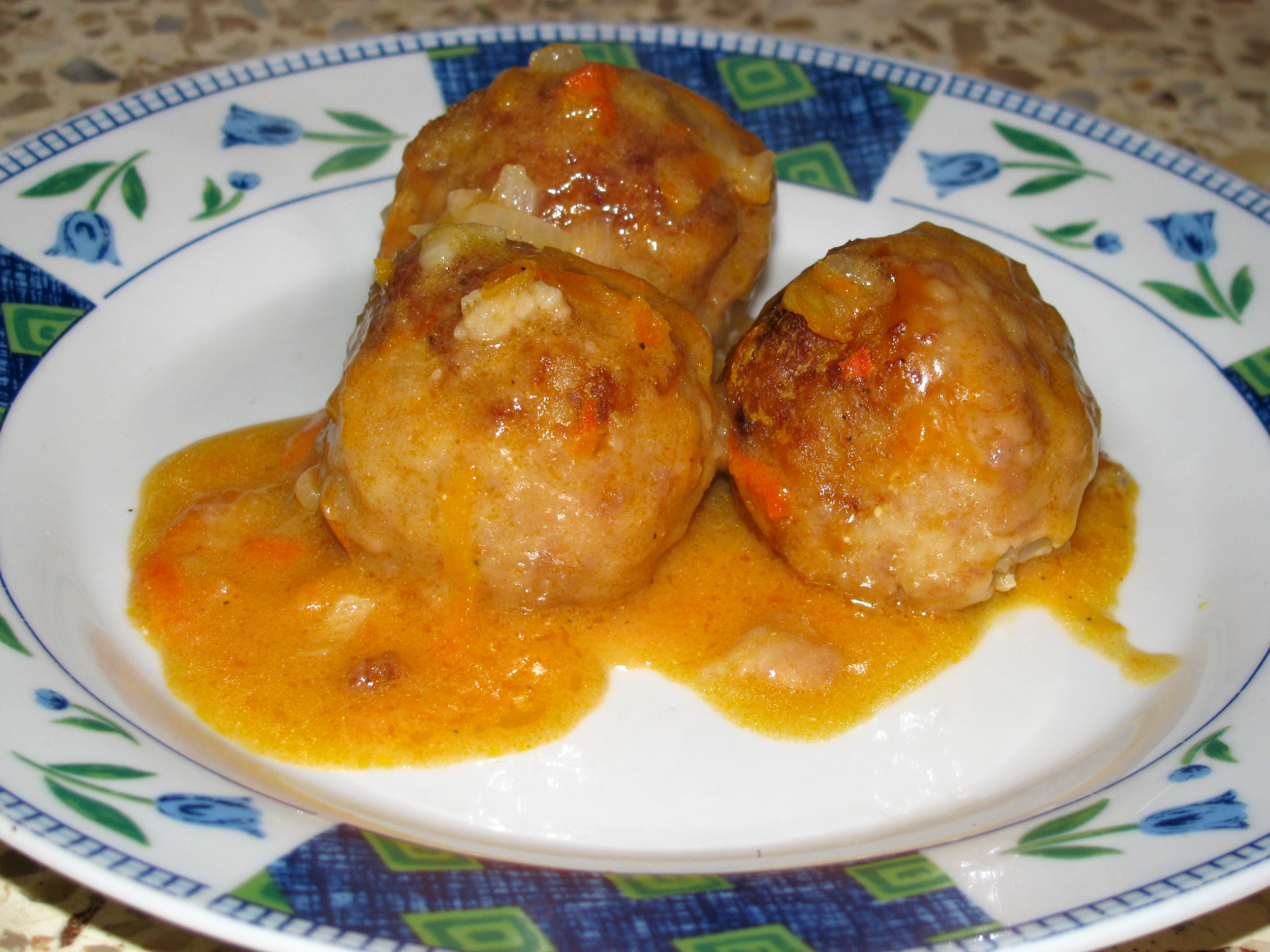
A Russian meatball dish

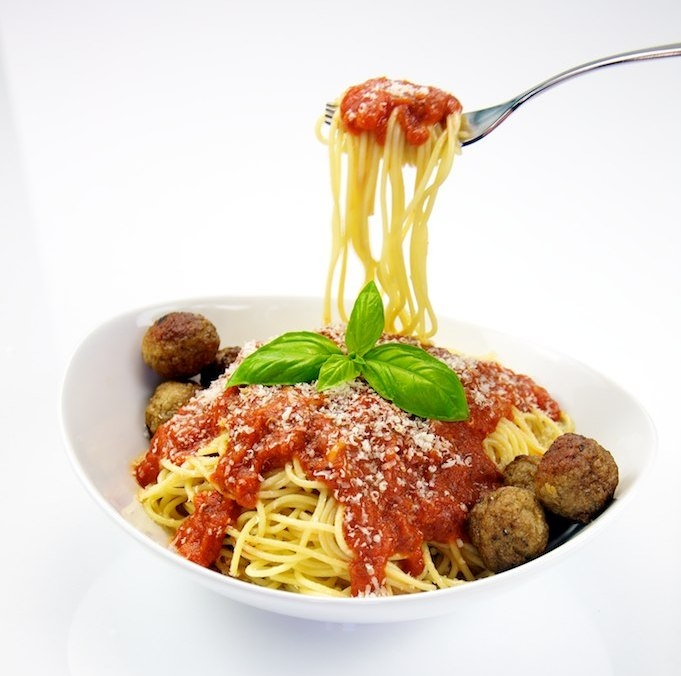
Spaghetti with meatballs

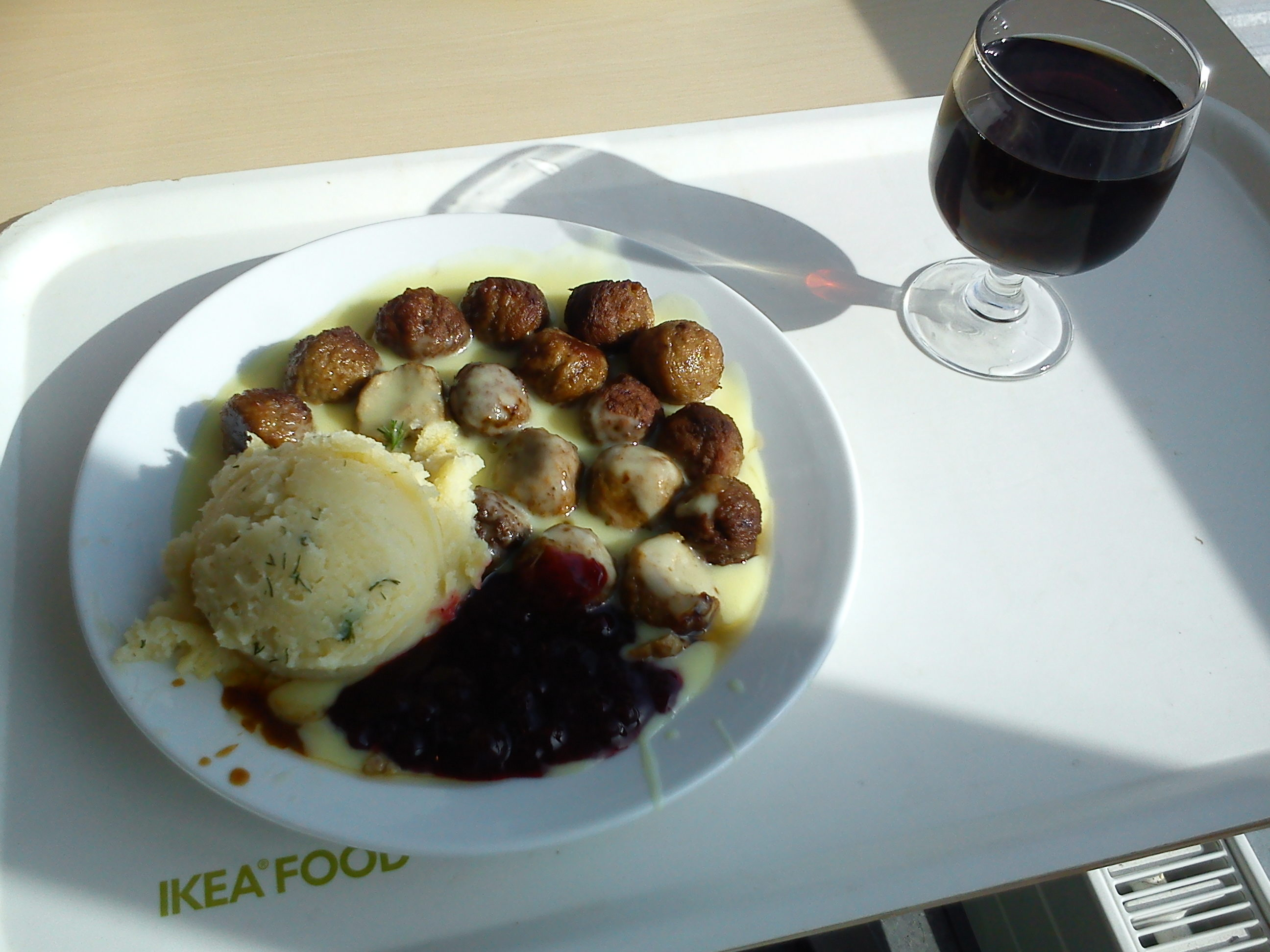
Swedish meatballs (köttbullar) at an Ikea store in Poznań, Poland

== See also ==
- List of beef dishes
- List of fish dishes
- List of lamb dishes
- List of pork dishes
