= Denominazione comunale d'origine =

Italian food protection recognition

Denominazione comunale d'origine (De.CO) or denominazione comunale (De.Co.) is an Italian recognition established and granted by the municipal administration in order to protect and enhance a typical product, a traditional recipe, an agri-food business or a craft product (food and non-food) in close correlation with the territory and its community, without any overlap with the designations of origin in force. The municipal designation of origin, unlike designations such as PDO, PGI, and TSG, is not a quality indication, but a certificate of typicality.

== Description ==
The De.Co. were established following state law no. 142 of 8 June 1990, which allows municipalities the right to regulate, within the scope of the principles on administrative decentralization, regarding the enhancement of traditional agri-food activities. Since 2002, they have normally been established using a model regulation prepared by National Association of Italian Municipalities.

In some cases, for example in Turin, the De.Co. can also be attributed to festivals, knowledge or characteristic lands of the territory. Liguria, with the regional law n. 11/2018, established a regional register of Ligurian municipalities with De.Co. products.

In the case of Stupinigi, a frazione of the comune of Nichelino, but whose territory of the natural park also extends within the administrative boundaries of Beinasco, Candiolo, None, Orbassano, and Vinovo, the De.Co. was established with inter-municipal regulation.
