= Spaghetti and meatballs =

Italian-American pasta dish

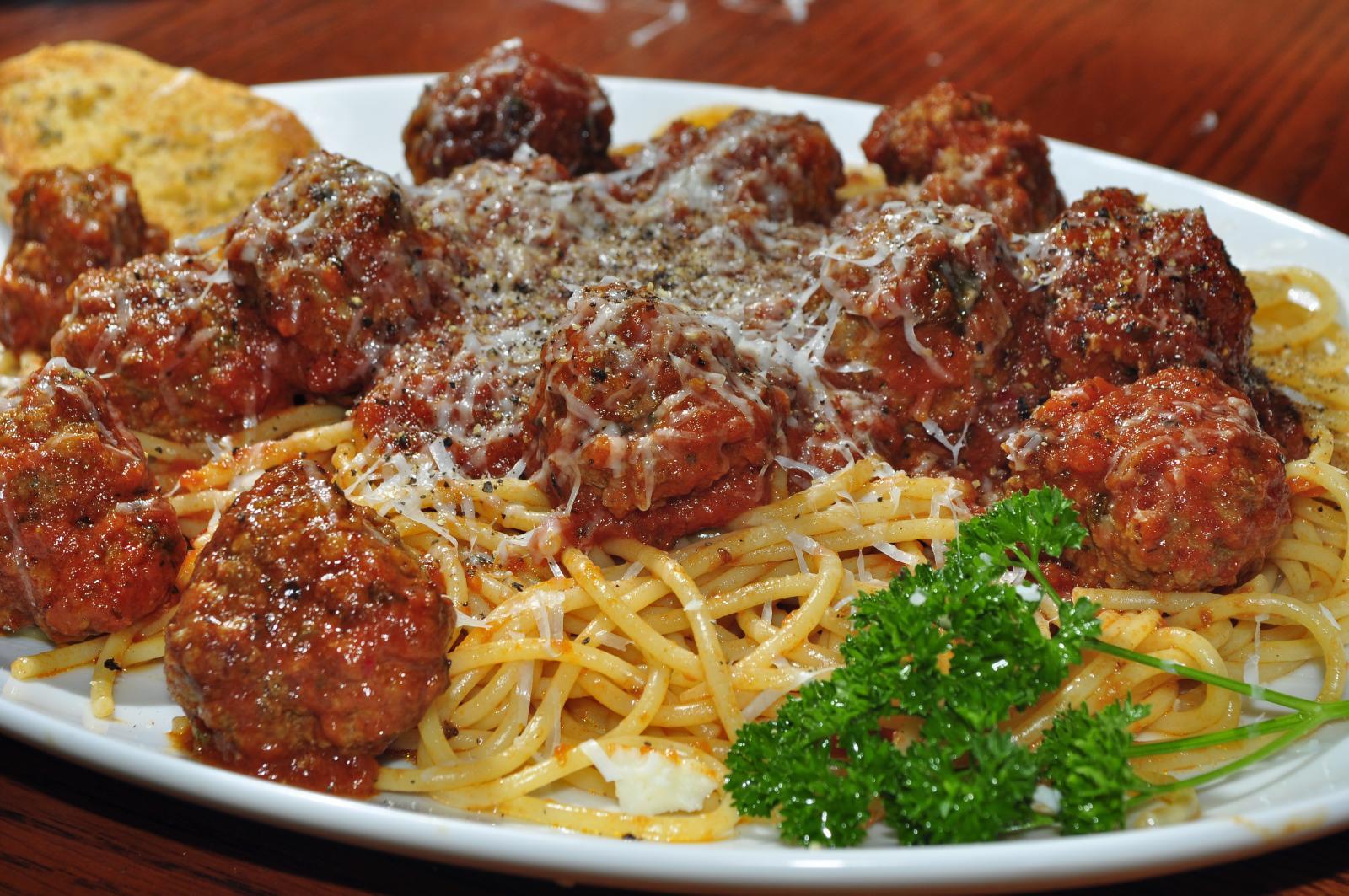
- Course: Main
- Place of origin: United States
- Region or state: New York City
- Associated cuisine: Italian-American
- Main ingredients: Spaghetti, tomato, meatballs

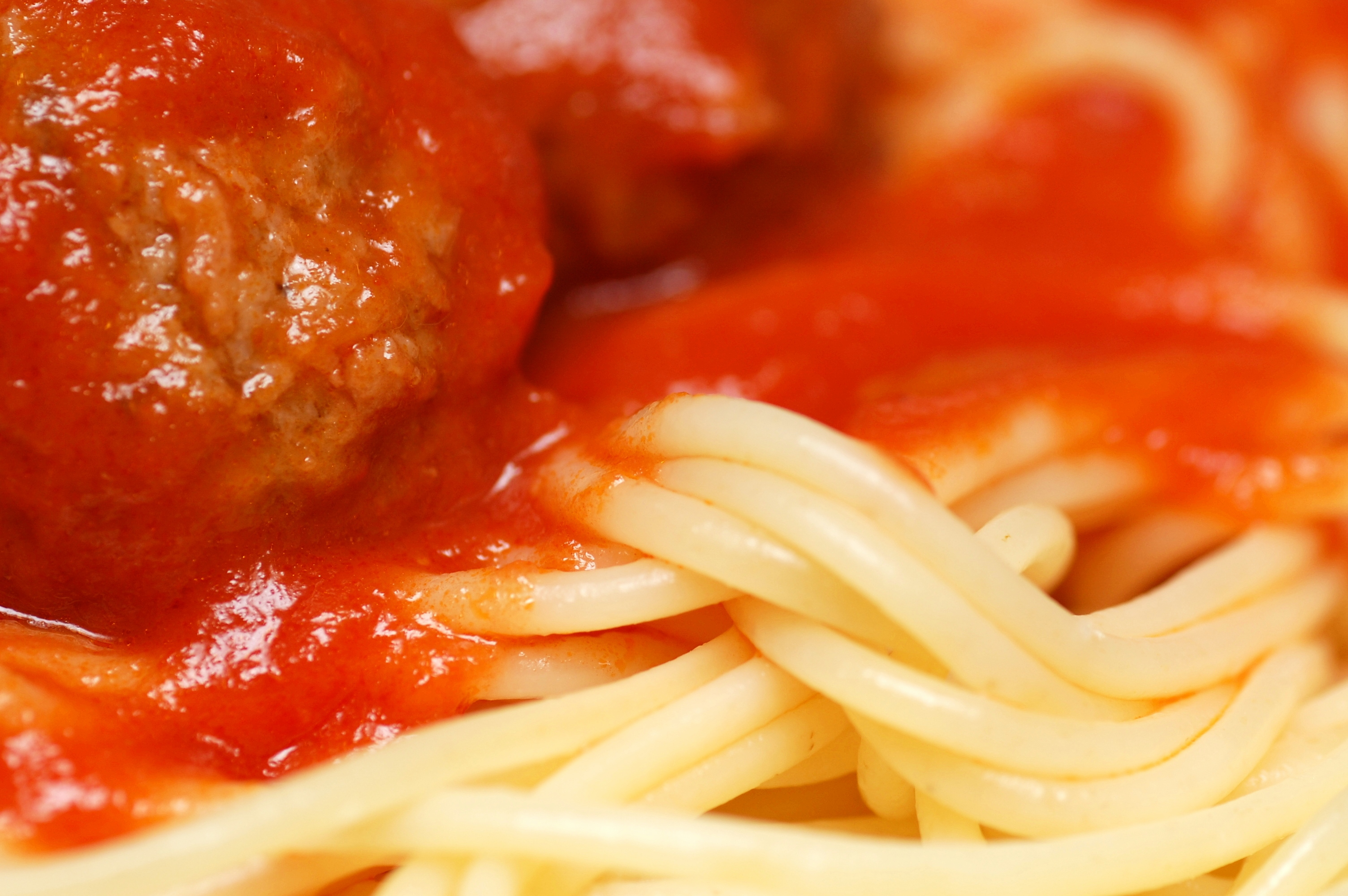
Close-up view of spaghetti and meatballs

Spaghetti and meatballs is an Italian-American pasta dish made with spaghetti, tomato, and meatballs.

Originally inspired by similar dishes from southern Italy, the modern version of spaghetti and meatballs was developed by Italian immigrants in New York City. It grew in popularity during the first half of the 20th century and is today considered a classic in Italian-American cuisine both in New York City and the rest of the U.S.

== History ==
When arriving in America, Italian immigrants brought their food traditions with them, but the availability of new ingredients and a better economy meant that traditional peasant foods from southern Italy evolved. This often included the addition of more expensive ingredients and a higher meat content, creating more plentiful meals. This way, spaghetti and meatballs soon became a popular dish among Italian immigrants in New York City.

Early references to the dish include:

- In 1888, Juliet Corson of New York published a recipe for pasta and meatballs and tomato sauce.
- In 1909, a recipe for "Beef Balls with Spaghetti" appeared in American Cookery, Volume 13.
- The National Pasta Association (originally named the National Macaroni Manufacturers Association) published a recipe for spaghetti and meatballs in the 1920s.
- In 1931, Venice Maid in New Jersey was selling canned "spaghetti with meatballs in sauce".

== In Italy ==
The dish is widely popular in the United States, albeit practically unheard-of in Italy. Italian writers and chefs often mock the dish, together with many other popular examples of Italian-American cuisine, such as chicken parmesan, as pseudo-Italian or non-Italian.

== See also ==
- Italian-American cuisine
- List of pasta
- List of pasta dishes
- List of meatball dishes
