= Hamburger America (film) =

- Directed by: George Motz
- Produced by: George Motz; Casey Benjamin
- Cinematography: George Motz
- Edited by: George Motz; Virginie Danglades
- Music by: Tony Ormond
- Production company: MotzFilms
- Release dates: April 11, 2004 (Chicago); December 3, 2004 (Santa Fe)
- Running time: 54 minutes
- Country: United States
- Language: English
- Budget: $10,000

Hamburger America is a 2004 American documentary film directed by George Motz. The film highlights eight family-owned hamburger restaurants across various regions of the United States.

== Background and production ==
Working as a commercial cameraman in 2001, George Motz had the idea to create Hamburger America while sitting with his wife Casey Benjamin, who co-produced the film; as Motz explained, "We were watching TV and saw a show about hot dogs, and I thought, 'Gee, I've never seen a really good documentary about hamburgers.'"

Over the course of the next three years, Motz traveled across the United States to various hamburger restaurants, selecting them under the criteria that they must be family-owned, use fresh beef, be more than 40 years old, and offer a distinctive burger that has stayed the same over those years. Motz researched 26 restaurants throughout the country, eight of which made it into the film. None of the restaurants featured in the film are from major coastal cities; as Motz explained, "Anybody can go to New York or L.A. and get a burger ... But I want people to go to Milwaukee and get a burger. I want people to think about Oklahoma and think about burgers."

Motz calls Hamburger America a "pro-burger film," in contrast to works criticizing fast food such as the documentary Super Size Me, which was released the same year, or the book Fast Food Nation, which Motz cited as an inspiration for the film.

== Release ==
The film premiered on April 19, 2004, at the Museum of Contemporary Art Chicago, followed by a release party at Billy Goat Tavern, one of the restaurants featured in the film. It was also shown on December 3, 2004, at the Santa Fe Film Festival. It was released on DVD alongside two screenings at Two Boots Pioneer Theater in New York City on February 1, 2005.

== Restaurants ==
Hamburger America documents the following hamburger restaurants, listed in order of appearance in the film:

Restaurant	Location	Opened	Known for	Ref.
Dyer's Burgers	Memphis, Tennessee	1912	Deep-fried hamburgers	
Ted's Restaurant	Meriden, Connecticut	1959	Steamed cheeseburgers	
Wheel Inn Drive-In	Sedalia, Missouri	1947 (closed in 2013)	Guber burgers (made with peanut butter)	
Solly's Grille	Glendale, Wisconsin	1936	Butter burgers	
Meers Store & Restaurant	Meers, Oklahoma	1901	Texas Longhorn burgers	
Bobcat Bite	Santa Fe, New Mexico	1953	Green chile burgers	
Louis' Lunch	New Haven, Connecticut	1895	Claiming to have invented the hamburger	
Billy Goat Tavern	Chicago, Illinois	1934	Curse of the Billy Goat and Saturday Night Live's Olympia Café	

== Legacy ==
In 2006, Hamburger America was nominated for a James Beard Foundation Award. In 2011, the film was selected by the United States National Archives and Records Administration for a screening at the National Archives Building.

Since releasing the film, George Motz has become a "leading authority on hamburgers," as described by The New York Times. The film went on to inform Motz's later ventures, including his 2008 book Hamburger America: A State-by-State Guide to 200 Great Burger Joints, as well as his restaurant Hamburger America, which opened in SoHo, Manhattan in 2023 and draws inspiration from the restaurants featured the film.
