= Hamburger America =

Restaurant in Manhattan, New York, U.S.

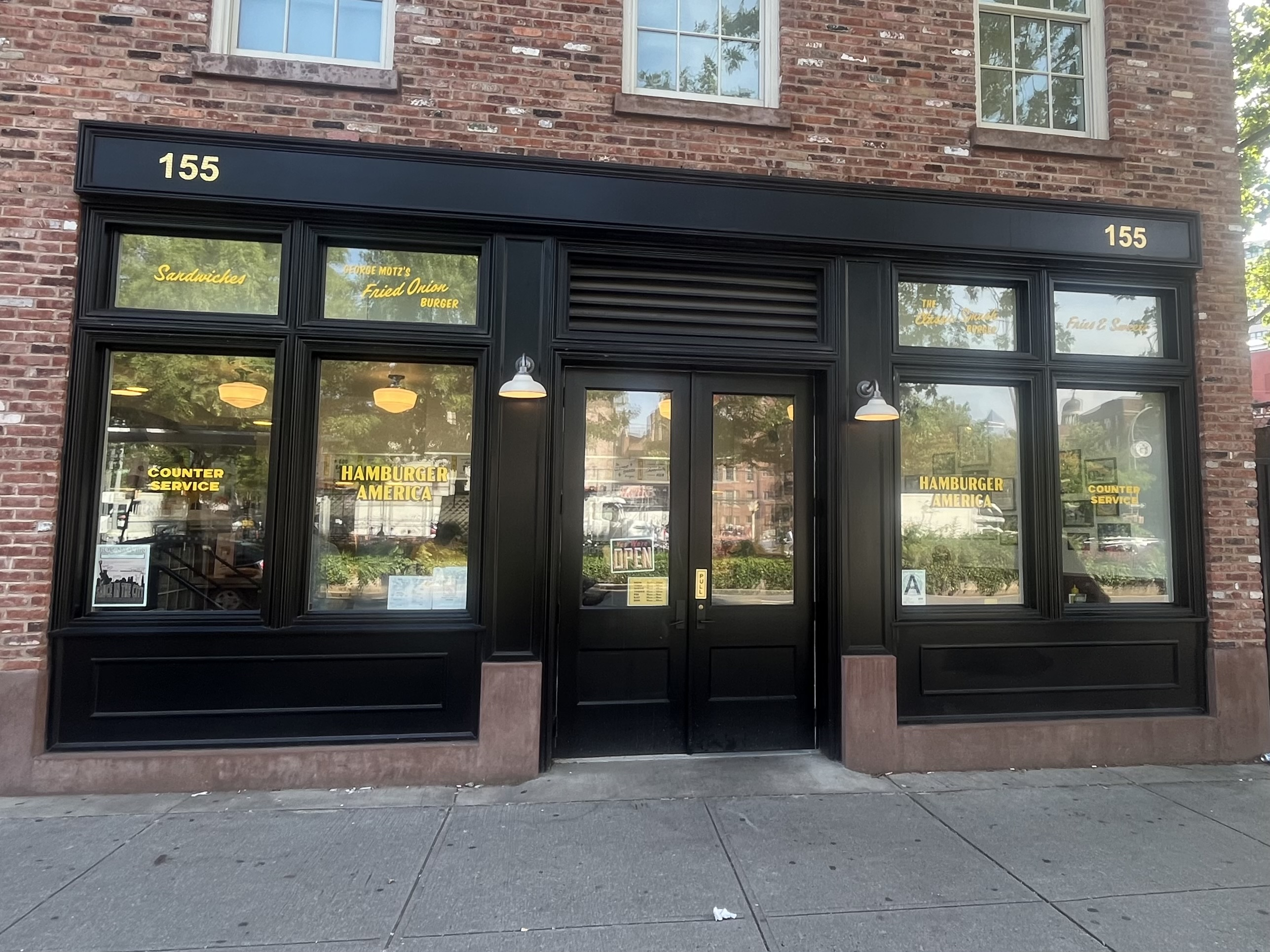
- The restaurant's exterior in May 2024
- Interactive map of Hamburger America

Restaurant information
- Established: November 2023; 2 years ago
- Owner: George Motz
- Head chef: George Motz
- Food type: Hamburgers; sandwiches; American cuisine
- Location: 51 MacDougal Street (entrance on Houston Street), New York, New York, 10012, United States
- Coordinates: 40°43′41″N 74°00′09″W
- Website: www.hamburgeramerica.com

Hamburger America is a luncheonette-style hamburger restaurant located at 51 MacDougal Street in SoHo, Manhattan, New York City. It was founded in 2023 by American chef, television personality, and burger scholar George Motz as an homage to the history of the hamburger in the United States. Specializing in traditional smash burgers, french fries, sandwiches, and milk drinks including egg cream, the restaurant offers 11-stool counter service, booth and table seating, and take-out.

== History ==
Hamburger America derives its name from founder George Motz's 2004 documentary film Hamburger America and 2008 book Hamburger America: A State-by-State Guide to 200 Great Burger Joints, which both chronicle the history of the hamburger in the United States and showcase regional burgers throughout the United States.

During the COVID-19 pandemic, Motz created the Burgerslide, "a socially distant burger delivery system" through which he delivered thousands of Oklahoma onion burgers out of his Brooklyn apartment and other pop-up locations. He then partnered with restaurant owners Jonathan and Andrew Schnipper to develop his first brick-and-mortar restaurant, which became Hamburger America. Motz's goal was to recreate "what hamburgers used to taste like" by using historically accurate ingredients and cooking processes.

Construction for Hamburger America broke ground in May 2023, with initial plans to open in July 2023. The restaurant eventually opened in November 2023, drawing notable guests on its opening day including Chris Rock, Sean Evans, Christy Turlington, and former New York City mayor Michael Bloomberg.

Motz has considered expanding the restaurant to additional locations, but says that for the time being, he is "just trying to get one right".

== Menu ==
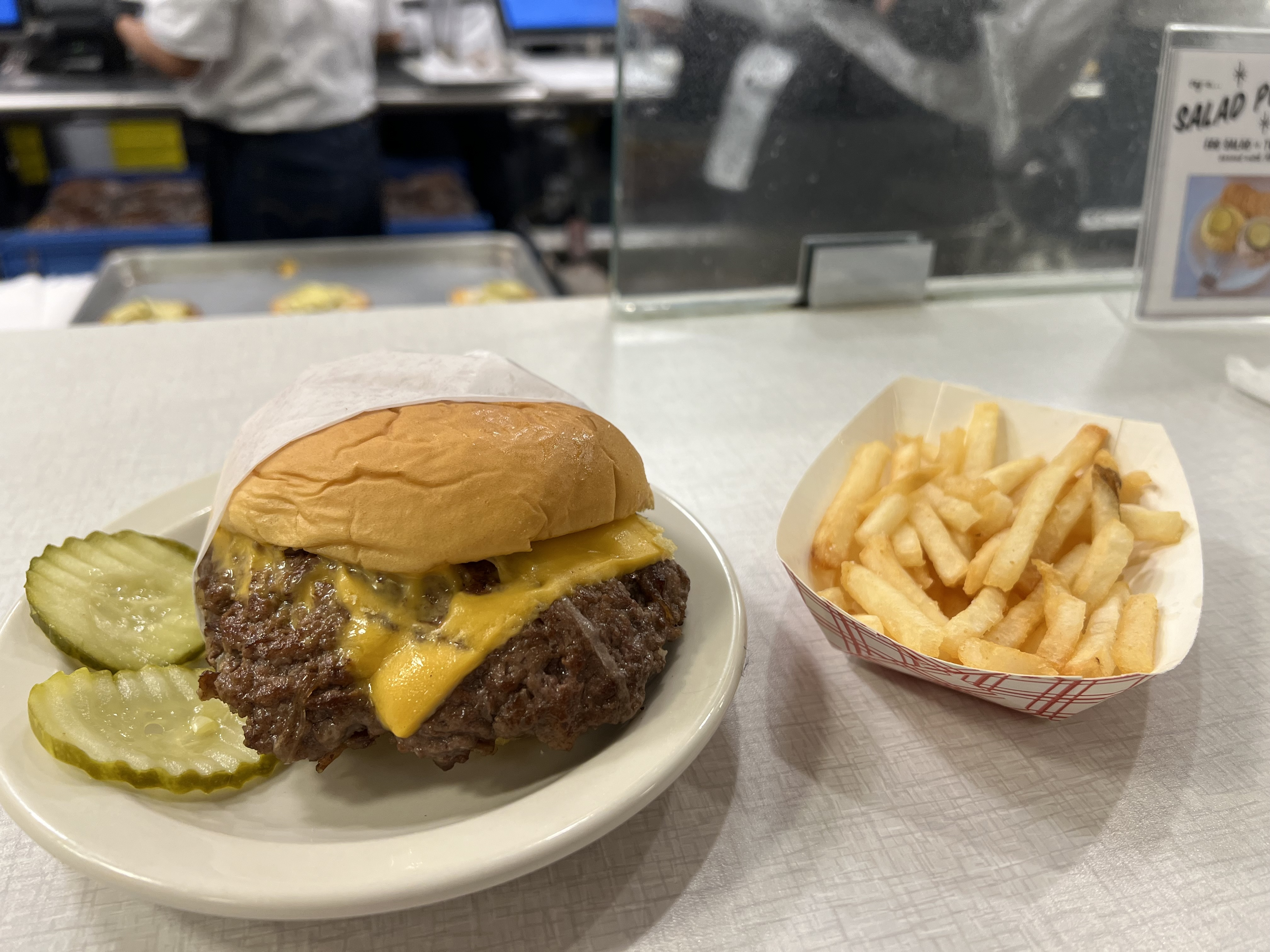
Motz's fried onion burger with french fries, served at the countertop

Hamburger America offers two hamburgers—a classic smash burger and an Oklahoma-style fried onion burger known as "George Motz's fried onion burger"—both of which can be ordered with a single or double patty and with or without American cheese. Both burgers are smashed using Motz's proprietary "Smashula", which is custom-made in Argentina. The restaurant also serves french fries; diner-style sandwiches including egg salad, tuna salad, peanut butter and jelly, and The Chester, a variant on the patty melt; and desserts including key lime pie. Beverages include coffee, lemonade, Miller High Life beer, and a selection of traditional American flavored milk drinks such as coffee milk and egg cream.

Since April 2024, the restaurant has offered a monthly rotation of regional American hamburgers, including the olive burger from Lansing, Michigan, the butter burger from Wisconsin, and the double-patty No. 5 from Keller's Drive-In in Dallas, Texas.

== Reception ==
Hamburger America has received positive reviews from restaurant critics. In April 2024, The New York Times restaurant critic Pete Wells named the restaurant among the top 100 restaurants in New York City, calling it "the geeked-out burger stand New York didn't know it needed". In a full-length review, Wells called Hamburger America "part fast food restaurant, part shrine to roadside America, part art installation, part nostalgia immersion," writing that Motz's onion burger "tastes like late-night drives into empty downtowns, of cheap beer on boardwalks and wax paper at fly-by-night carnivals, of places where you talk to weird characters you wouldn't meet in the daytime."

Helen Rosner of The New Yorker wrote that the classic smash burger "is fantastic, strong and correct. You don't need to know the history of burgers to be taken with its honest flavors, its modest size, its firm handshake of pickle and onion and good ol' American ground beef. It's a hamburger you trust, a hamburger you'd feel good about taking your daughter to prom." Robert Sietsema of Eater said the classic smash burger is "probably the best smash burger in the city".

Tammie Teclemariam of New York magazine's Grub Street pointed to the restaurant's hype on social media platforms such as TikTok, confirming that its burgers "live up to the hype: they deliver a concentrated beef flavor and bring a new level of crusty smash to the city."

== See also ==
- 7th Street Burger
- List of hamburger restaurants
- List of restaurants in New York City
