= 7th Street Burger =

American fast-food hamburger restaurant chain

- Exterior of the restaurant's original location on East 7th Street in East Village, Manhattan
- Type: Private
- Industry: Fast-food restaurant
- Founded: June 2021; 5 years ago in East Village, Manhattan, New York City
- Founders: Kevin Rezvani; Paras Jain
- Headquarters: New York City, United States
- Number of locations: 19 (2025)
- Area served: New York metropolitan area; Washington, D.C.
- Products: Smash burgers; french fries
- Website: www.7thstreetburger.com

7th Street Burger is an American fast-food restaurant chain specializing in smash burgers that primarily serves the New York metropolitan area. Founded by American entrepreneurs Kevin Rezvani and Paras Jain, its first location opened in June 2021 on the namesake East 7th Street in East Village, Manhattan, New York City.

As of January 2025, it has expanded to 19 locations mostly in New York City, with two in Washington, D.C., one in Hackensack, and additional planned locations in Philadelphia, Baltimore, and Boston. According to Rezvani, the restaurant aims to be the "In-N-Out of the East Coast".

== History ==
7th Street Burger was founded by New Jersey-based entrepreneur Kevin Rezvani, who grew up visiting his grandfather's bakery in Japan, worked in the cafeteria while he was a student at Rutgers University, and worked as a line cook for several years after graduation. His first restaurant venture was the casual sit-down hamburger restaurant chain Diesel & Duke, based in New Brunswick, New Jersey, which closed in 2020 due to disagreements with his business partners. During the COVID-19 pandemic, Rezvani worked at a moving company and as an Amazon delivery driver, which inspired him to create a restaurant that focused on maximizing operational efficiency and output. After closing Diesel & Duke, he drove around the country seeking burger inspiration, finding it from slider restaurants in Detroit and fried onion burgers from El Reno, Oklahoma.

In early June 2021, Rezvani and his longtime friend Paras Jain opened the first location of 7th Street Burger in a small space at 91 East 7th Street, the former location of longtime tenant Caracas Arepa Bar, in the East Village neighborhood of Manhattan. Rezvani said he "maxed out" his credit card to pay for the property's security deposit, which was discounted due to pandemic-era closures. Upon its opening, the restaurant featured a simple menu, listing only four food items: a single and double cheeseburger, an Impossible Burger, and French fries. Four months after opening, Rezvani reported that the restaurant sold between 900 and 1,000 burger patties on a typical weekend night, with sales peaking just before the restaurant's 3 a.m. closing time. The restaurant employs bouncers to control intoxicated customers.

7th Street Burger opened its second location at 110 MacDougal Street in Greenwich Village in March 2022. The chain rapidly expanded, reaching 10 locations in Manhattan by July 2023, opening an outpost in Hoboken, New Jersey in September 2023, and expanding to Brooklyn and Astoria, Queens, with 16 total locations by May 2024. Its first location outside of the New York metropolitan area opened in the Georgetown neighborhood of Washington, D.C. in June 2024. In September 2024, 7th Street Burger conducted a five-day residency in a "burger exchange" at Truffle Burger in Soho, London. As of January 2025, the chain has reached 19 locations and plans to open additional locations in Philadelphia, Baltimore, and Boston.

Since opening 7th Street Burger, Rezvani and Jain have also become co-owners of the New York City bagel restaurant chain Apollo Bagels.

== Menu ==
7th Street Burger is noted for its minimal menu, allowing customers to order single or double smash burgers made with beef or Impossible patties, with or without cheese. The burgers are made with 75% lean beef sourced from Schweid & Sons, topped with sweet onions, American cheese, a single pickle slice, and a house sauce, and served on a Martin's potato roll. French fries are offered in one size, optionally "loaded" with ground beef and burger toppings. Beverages are limited to water, Mexican Coke, and Fanta.

== Reception ==
Eater restaurant critic Robert Sietsema called 7th Street Burger's cheeseburger "an absolute joy to eat," commenting: "The beef brims with flavor and grease gloriously soaks the bun. Whether the bun is intentionally flattened by the grill cook or not, the squished bun further concentrates the flavors, with the supporting roles filled by lightly sautéed onions, yellow American cheese, and a sour-creamy sauce that tastes slightly of mustard." In a 2023 review, he added that "the Impossible vegetarian version tasted the same, only more crumbly".

In a 2021 review for New York magazine's Grub Street, Rob Patronite and Robin Raisfeld affirmed that the restaurant's burger exemplifies "how God intended burgers to be, as well as loosely packed, onion-smashed, crisp-edged, and spectacularly greasy," naming it "one of the best new burgers in town." The Infatuation restaurant critic Kenny Yang concluded that he "wouldn't change a single thing about" the burger, writing that "the whole thing, with its gooey yellow American cheese, is an unapologetic salute to salt and fat."

Condé Nast Traveler, The Infatuation, and Gotham have listed 7th Street Burger among the best hamburger restaurants in New York City.

== See also ==
- Hamburger America
- List of hamburger restaurants
- List of restaurants in New York City
