= Smoked hamburger =

Hamburger patty

A smoked hamburger is a hamburger patty that has been cooked by exposing it to smoke from burning or smoldering material, most often wood. It is common in Texas.

Smoking a burger can require 30 minutes to two hours' time over low heat, such as 225 °F (107 °C). Smoking ground meat is prone to overcooking, as smoking is intended for long, slow cooks "far beyond well-done", according to Texas Monthly. Nevertheless a hamburger is "one of the fastest and easiest things to cook on a smoker", making it a good choice for beginners, according to chef Robbie Shoults, speaking to Tasting Table.

According to George Motz, recommended toppings are barbecue sauce, pickles, and onion.
