= History of the hamburger in the United States =

Aspect of American culture history

A hamburger is a specific type of burger. It is a sandwich that consists of a cooked ground beef meat patty, placed between halves of a sliced bun. Hamburgers are often served with various condiments, such as dill relish (condiment), mayonnaise, and other options including lettuce, tomato, onion, pickles, and cheese.

== History ==
The Texas historian Frank X. Tolbert attributes the invention of the hamburger to Fletcher Davis of Athens, Texas. Davis is believed to have sold hamburgers at his café at 115 Tyler Street in Athens, Texas, in the late 1880s, before bringing them to the 1904 St. Louis World's Fair.

=== 1891: Oscar Bilby ===
There is evidence that the first hamburger served on a bun was made by Oscar Bilby of Tulsa, Oklahoma, in 1891.

In April 1995, the Dallas Morning News reported on an Oklahoma author who said that Tulsa beat out Texas as the birthplace of the delicacy. Michael Wallis, author of "Route 66, The Mother Road", was quoted by the newspaper as saying that he had discovered Tulsa's place in culinary history, which he made while researching the state’s tastiest hamburgers. He started at the restaurant that has been voted Tulsa's best burger more often than any other restaurant since 1933, Weber’s Root Beer Stand. Wallis’ research revealed that Oscar Weber Bilby was the first person to serve a real hamburger when, on July 4, 1891, ground beef was served on his wife’s homemade buns at a Fourth of July party on his farm, just west of present-day Tulsa. Until then, ground beef had been served in Athens, Texas, on simple slices of bread, known then and presently as a "patty melt". According to the Tulsa-based author, the bun is essential. Therefore, in 1995, Governor Frank Keating cited Athens, Texas' serving of ground beef between two slices of bread as a minor accomplishment. The governor's April 1995 proclamation also cites the first true hamburger on the bun, after meticulous research, was created and consumed in Tulsa in 1891. The Governor's Proclamation cites April 13, 1995, in Tulsa as "The Real Birthplace of the Hamburger."

=== 1885: Menches Brothers ===
Residents of Hamburg, New York, which is named after Hamburg, Germany, attribute the hamburger to Ohioans Frank Menches and Charles Menches. According to legend, the Menches brothers were vendors at the 1885 Erie County Fair (then called the Buffalo Fair) when they ran out of sausage for sandwiches and used beef instead. They named the resulting sandwich after the location of the fair. However, Frank Menches's obituary in The New York Times stated, instead, that these events took place at the 1892 Summit County Fair in Akron, Ohio.

=== 1885: Charlie Nagreen ===
The Seymour Community Historical Society of Seymour, Wisconsin, credits Charlie Nagreen, now known as "Hamburger Charlie", with the invention of the hamburger. Nagreen was 15 when he reportedly made sandwiches out of meatballs that he was selling at the 1885 Seymour Fair (now the Outagamie County Fair) to make it easier for customers to eat while walking. The Historical Society explains that Nagreen named the hamburger after the Hamburg steak, with which local German immigrants were familiar.

=== 1894: Barny's Saloon ===
Hamburger expert and "burger scholar" George Motz has cited a Texas newspaper from 1894 as the earliest documented mention of a hamburger to date, which says "Hamburger steak sandwiches every day in the week at Barny's Saloon, Moulton."

=== 1895: Louis' Lunch ===
The Library of Congress credits Danish immigrant Louis Lassen of Louis' Lunch, a small lunch wagon in New Haven, Connecticut, with selling the first hamburger and steak sandwich in the U.S. in 1895.

== Hamburger bun ==
The hamburger bun was invented in 1916 by a fry cook named Walter Anderson, who co-founded White Castle in 1921.

=== U.S. hamburger restaurants ===
The following restaurants have either played a part in the creation of the hamburger sandwich, developed a unique cooking method, or were the first to sell them nationwide:

- Louis' Lunch 1895, New Haven, Connecticut. Louis' Lunch has been selling steak and hamburger sandwiches since 1895, when Louis Lassen opened his lunch wagon. This small establishment, which advertises itself as the oldest hamburger restaurant in the U.S., is credited by some with having invented the classic American hamburger when Louis sandwiched a ground steak patty between two pieces of white toast for a busy office worker in 1900. Louis' Lunch flame broils the hamburgers in the original 1898 Bridge & Beach vertical cast iron gas stoves using locally developed steel wire gridirons to hold the hamburgers in place during cooking (U.S. Patent #2,148,879). In 1974, The New York Times published a story about Louis' Lunch claiming to have invented the hamburger. The U.S. Library of Congress' American Folklife Center Local Legacies Project website credits Louis' Lunch as the maker of America's first hamburger and steak sandwich. The hamburger is still served today on two pieces of toast and not a bun.
- Dyer's Burgers, 1912, Memphis, Tennessee, deep-fried burgers using a cast-iron skillet.
- White Castle, 1921, Wichita, Kansas. Following the war, hamburgers became unpopular until the White Castle restaurant chain marketed and sold large numbers of small two-and-a-half-inch square hamburgers. They started to punch five holes in each patty, which helps them cook evenly and eliminates the need to flip the burgers. Their burger first sold for five cents. White Castle holds a U.S trademark on the word "slyders." The White Castle building was modeled after the water tower building in Chicago, with the turrets and fortress-like walls. White Castle was the first to sell their hamburgers in grocery stores and vending machines. They also created the industrial-strength spatula, and were the first to mass-produce the paper hat. Today, there are more than 400 White Castle restaurants around the country, selling over 550 million hamburgers per year.

=== Cheeseburger ===
- The Rite Spot, circa 1925, Pasadena, California. Lionel Sternberger claims to have invented the cheeseburger.
- Kaelin's Restaurant, 1934, Louisville, Kentucky. This Kentucky restaurant claims to have invented the cheeseburger in 1934.
- Humpty Dumpty Drive-In, 1935, Denver, Colorado. A trademark for the name cheeseburger was awarded to Louis Ballast of the Humpty Dumpty Drive-In in 1935.
- Jack’s Lunch, 1930s, Middletown, Connecticut. The steamed cheeseburger is believed to have been invented at this restaurant operated by Jack Fitzgerald.
- Bob's Pantry (Bob's Big Boy), 1937, Glendale, California. Bob Wian invented the double-deck cheeseburger. The Big Boy double-deck hamburger lent its name to his restaurant chain.

== Variations ==
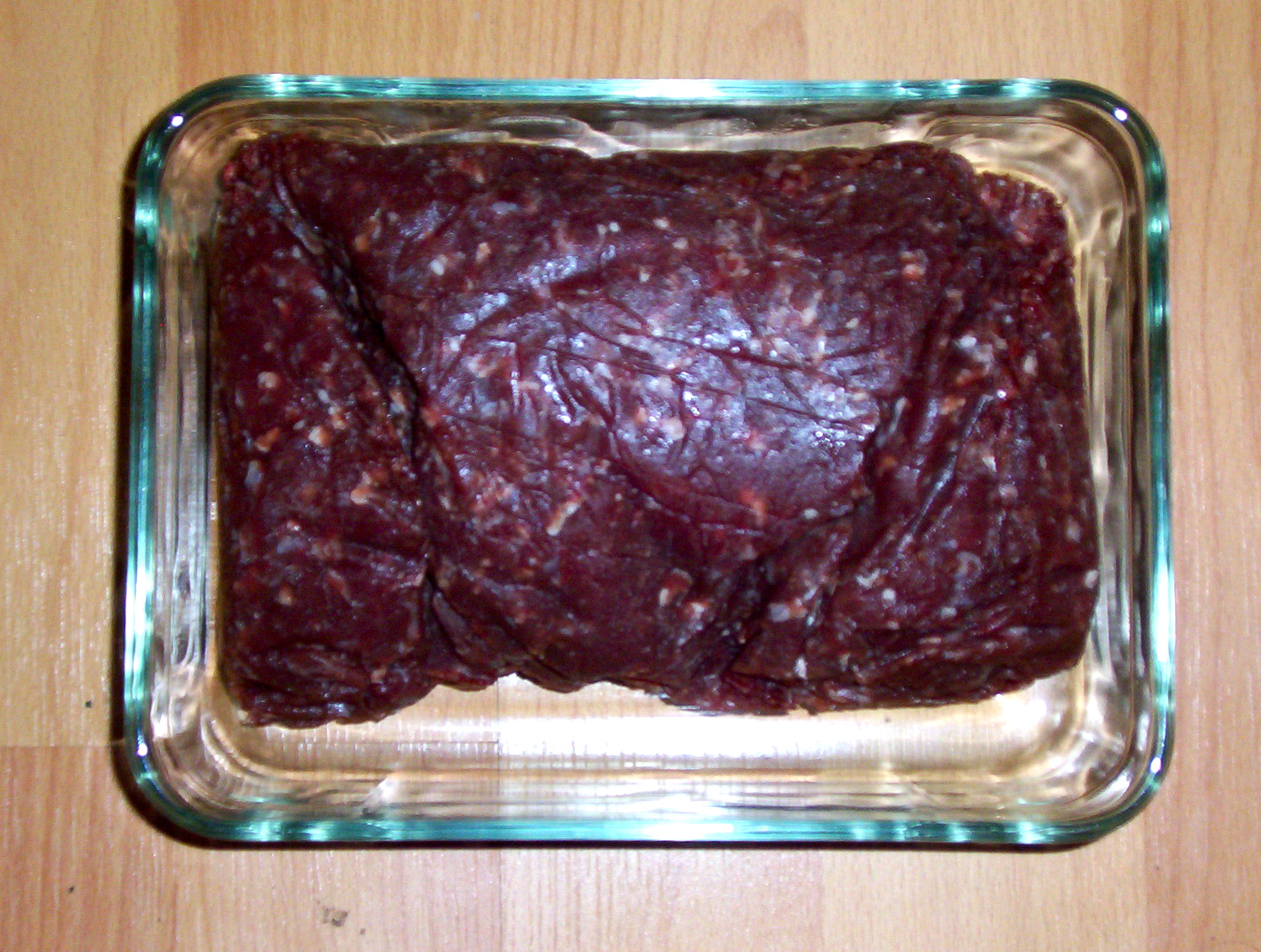
Game meats and other exotic or unusual meats are increasingly used to make burgers, such as this ground Elk meat. Note the relatively low fat content. (approx 1 pound (0.45 kg))

In the United States, hamburgers may be classified into one of two primary categories: fast food hamburgers or individually prepared burgers made in homes and restaurants. The latter are traditionally prepared "with everything" (or "all the way", "deluxe", "the works", "dragged through the garden", or, in some regions, "all dressed"), which includes lettuce, tomato, onion, and sliced pickles (or pickle relish). Cheese (usually processed cheese slices, but often Cheddar, Swiss, pepper jack, or blue cheese), either melted on the meat patty or crumbled on top, is a popular option. In the Carolinas, a time-honored popular style for hamburgers and hot dogs served in diners and homes (but not fast food chains) is "all the way", meaning mustard, slaw, chili and onions.

Condiments may be added to the hamburger or offered separately on the side. The three most common condiments are mustard, mayonnaise, and ketchup. However, salad dressings and barbecue sauce are also popular. McDonald's uses their own "Big Mac sauce" on their signature Big Mac hamburger. Heinz 57 sauce is popular among burger enthusiasts.

Other popular toppings include bacon, avocado or guacamole, sliced sautéed mushrooms, sliced sauce and/or chili (usually without beans). Somewhat less common toppings include fried egg, scrambled egg, feta cheese, salsa, pineapple, Jalapeños and other varieties of chile peppers, anchovies, slices of ham or bologna, pastrami, or teriyaki-seasoned beef, tartar sauce, french fries, onion rings, or potato chips.

Standard toppings on hamburgers may vary depending upon location, particularly at restaurants that are not national or regional franchises. A "Texas burger" uses mustard as the only sauce, and comes with or without vegetables, jalapeno slices, and cheese. In New Mexico and parts of the Southwest, green chile burgers are very common. In the Upper Midwest, particularly Wisconsin, burgers are often made with a buttered bun, butter as one of the ingredients of the patty, or with a pat of butter on top of the burger patty. This is called a "Butter Burger". In the Carolinas, a Carolina-style hamburger "with everything" may be served with cheese, chili, onions, mustard, and coleslaw. National hamburger chain Wendy's sells a "Carolina Classic" burger with these toppings in these areas. In Hawaii, hamburgers are often topped with teriyaki sauce, derived from the Japanese-American culture, and locally grown pineapple. In areas of the Midwest and East Coast, a hamburger served with lettuce, tomato, and onion is called a "California burger". This usage is sufficiently widespread to appear on the menus of Dairy Queen. In the Western U.S., a "California" burger often denotes a cheeseburger with guacamole and bacon added. Pastrami burgers are particularly popular in Salt Lake City, Utah.

Hamburgers may be described by their combined uncooked weight. A single, uncooked burger weighing a nominal four ounces or 113.5 grams is a "quarter pounder". Instead of a "double hamburger", one might encounter a third- or half-pounder, weighing eight ounces or 227 grams. Burger patties are nearly always specified in fractions of a pound.

In the continental U.S., it is uncommon to hear of a chicken patty or breast on a hamburger bun referred to as a "chicken burger". This is almost always called a "chicken sandwich," except for rare exceptions, such as with the Red Robin chain of restaurants. In Canada, "chicken burgers" generally refer to patties and, when using a chicken breast, to "chicken sandwiches". In Hawaii, small (usually marinated) pieces of chicken piled on a bun are referred to as a teriyaki chicken burger. This is similar to what is found in Japan, but is a local variation.

- A hamburger with two patties is called a "double decker" or simply a "double", while a hamburger with three patties is called a "triple". Doubles and triples are often combined with cheese and sometimes with bacon, yielding a "double cheeseburger", a "triple bacon cheeseburger", or, alternatively, a "bacon double" or "triple cheeseburger".
- A hamburger smothered in red or green chile is called a slopper and is common in the southwestern United States.
- A patty melt consists of a patty, sautéed onions, and cheese between two slices of rye bread. Sauerkraut may be added. The sandwich is then buttered and fried.
- A slider is a small hamburger patty sprinkled with diced onions and served on an equally small bun, so-named because their small size allows them to "slide" down the throat in one or two bites. Other versions of the story say that the term "slider" originated from the hamburgers served by flight line galleys at military airfields, which were so greasy they slid right through you; or aboard U.S. Navy ships, because of the way greasy burgers slid across the galley grill while the ship pitched and rolled. Another purveyor of the slider is Krystal restaurant. Burger King has sold pull-apart mini-burgers, first under the name "Burger Buddies" and later as "Burger Shots". In the late 2000s, the "slider" gained in popularity and has been featured on the menu even at more expensive restaurants, such as T.G.I. Fridays. Jack in the Box also serves sliders marketed as "Mini Sirloin Burgers".
- In Minnesota, a "Juicy Lucy" (or "Jucy Lucy", depending on which restaurant's origin claims is to be believed) is a hamburger with cheese inside the meat patty, rather than on top. A piece of cheese is surrounded by raw meat and cooked until it melts, resulting in a molten core of cheese within the patty. This scalding hot cheese tends to gush out at the first bite, so servers frequently warn patrons to let the sandwich cool for a few minutes before consumption.
- Buffalo burgers are made with meat from the American bison.
- A low carb burger is a hamburger with the bun omitted, and large pieces of lettuce used in its place, with mayonnaise and/or mustard being the primary sauces used.

== See also ==
- Food history
- Hamburger America
- List of hamburgers
- List of hamburger restaurants
