= Pete's Hamburgers =

Hamburger stand in Prairie du Chien, Wisconsin, U.S.

- Interactive map of Pete's Hamburgers

Restaurant information
- Location: Prairie du Chien, Wisconsin, United States
- Coordinates: 43°03′05.4″N 91°08′50.7″W

Pete's Hamburgers is a seasonal walk-up hamburger stand in Prairie du Chien, Wisconsin.

== Description ==
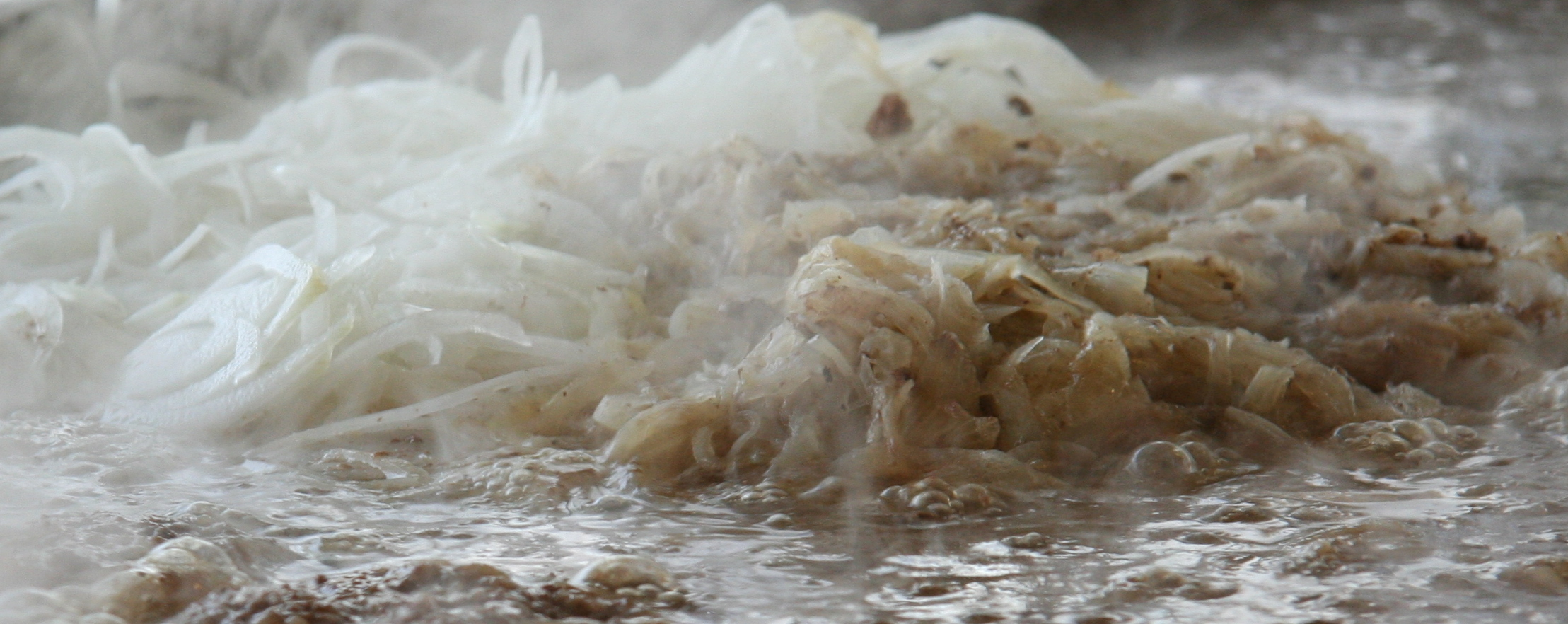
Onions poaching and frying on the grill at Pete's

The walk-up stand Pete's Hamburgers operates in Prairie du Chien, Wisconsin. It is open Friday through Sunday from April through October.

Pete's serves a hamburger that is poached in shallow water with thinly sliced onions that are poached along with the burgers. Burgers are served with or without cooked or raw onions and condiments; cheese is not offered as a topping. The 'Paul Gokey' burger includes cooked and raw onions, horseradish, and ketchup.

== History ==
The stand was started in 1909 by Pete Gokey, who owned a food cart he took to local events. He served burgers, and in order to keep burgers not immediately sold from drying out while he kept them warm on the flattop would add water to the flattop; customers returning for a second burger remarked that the second—watered—burger was better than the first, and Gokey started poaching the burgers. Eventually he opened a stand at the intersection of Blackhawk Avenue and Beaumont Road in Prairie du Chien. The stand goes through approximately one ton of onions in a season.

== Reception ==
George Motz wrote, "It's nowhere near a major city and is a destination burger stand if there ever was one." The Minneapolis Star-Tribune said it was "worth the drive to Wisconsin".
