= Smashburger (restaurant chain) =

American fast-casual chain

Smashburger IP Holder LLC
- Trade name: Smashburger
- Type: Subsidiary
- Industry: Restaurants
- Genre: Fast casual restaurant
- Founded: 2007; 19 years ago
- Founders: Rick Schaden and Tom Ryan
- Headquarters: Denver, Colorado, United States
- Number of locations: 227 (220 in the United States, 7 in Canada) (2026)
- Area served: United States; Canada; Costa Rica; El Salvador; Panama; Saudi Arabia; United Kingdom
- Products: Hamburgers, chicken sandwiches, salads, French fries, shakes, soft drinks
- Revenue: $338.3 million (2016)
- Parent: Independent (2007–2018); Jollibee Group (2018–present)
- Website: smashburger.com

Smashburger IP Holder LLC, doing business as Smashburger (stylized SmashBURGER), is an American multinational fast-casual hamburger restaurant chain founded in Denver, Colorado. As of 2022, it has more than 227 corporate and franchise-owned restaurants in 35 U.S. states, the District of Columbia and 2 Canadian provinces.

Founded in 2007 by Rick Schaden and Tom Ryan, the chain serves "smashed" burgers using a specialized process of cooking them on a flattop grill at a high heat. This technique originated in the Great Lakes region at pressed-chuck burger restaurants, and has been a staple there for decades. The method sears the burger for flavor. These are then topped with additional ingredients and can be customized. At one time, the chain offered unique burgers in each city where its restaurants were located. The menu also includes chicken, turkey and portobello sandwiches as well as french fries, sweet potato fries, fried pickles and other items. Some locations offer the Udi's gluten-free bun.

The restaurant saw rapid growth after its first location opened in 2007 and it added several hundred locations within a few years, although a larger slowdown of the "better burger" industry saw it slow its size and expansion plans. Company leaders initially considered an IPO, but Philippine-based quick-service operator Jollibee Group bought a 40 percent stake in the company in 2015, at which time it was valued at $335 million. As of December 2018, Jollibee owns 100% of Smashburger.

== History ==
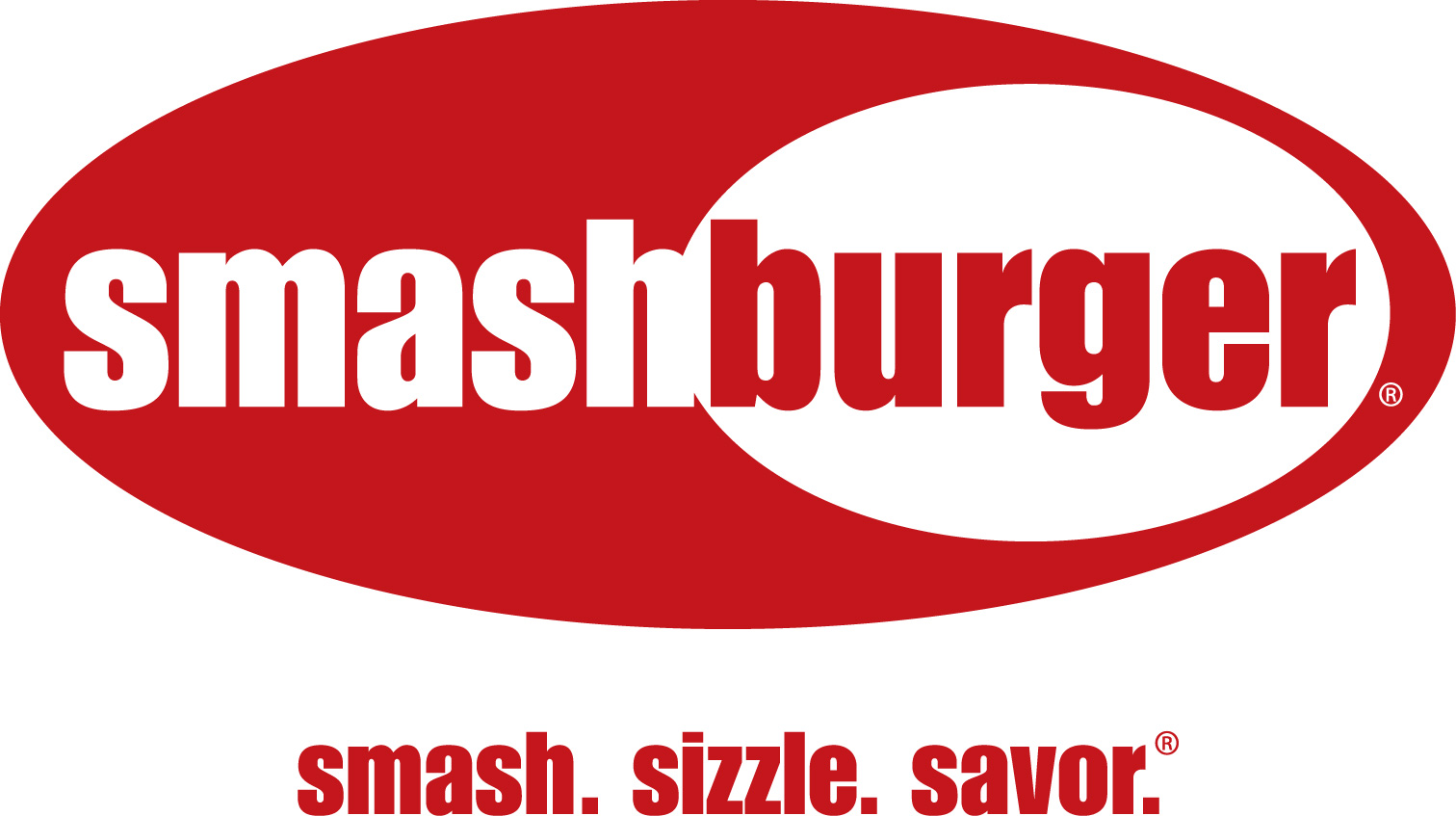
Logo used from 2010 until 2015

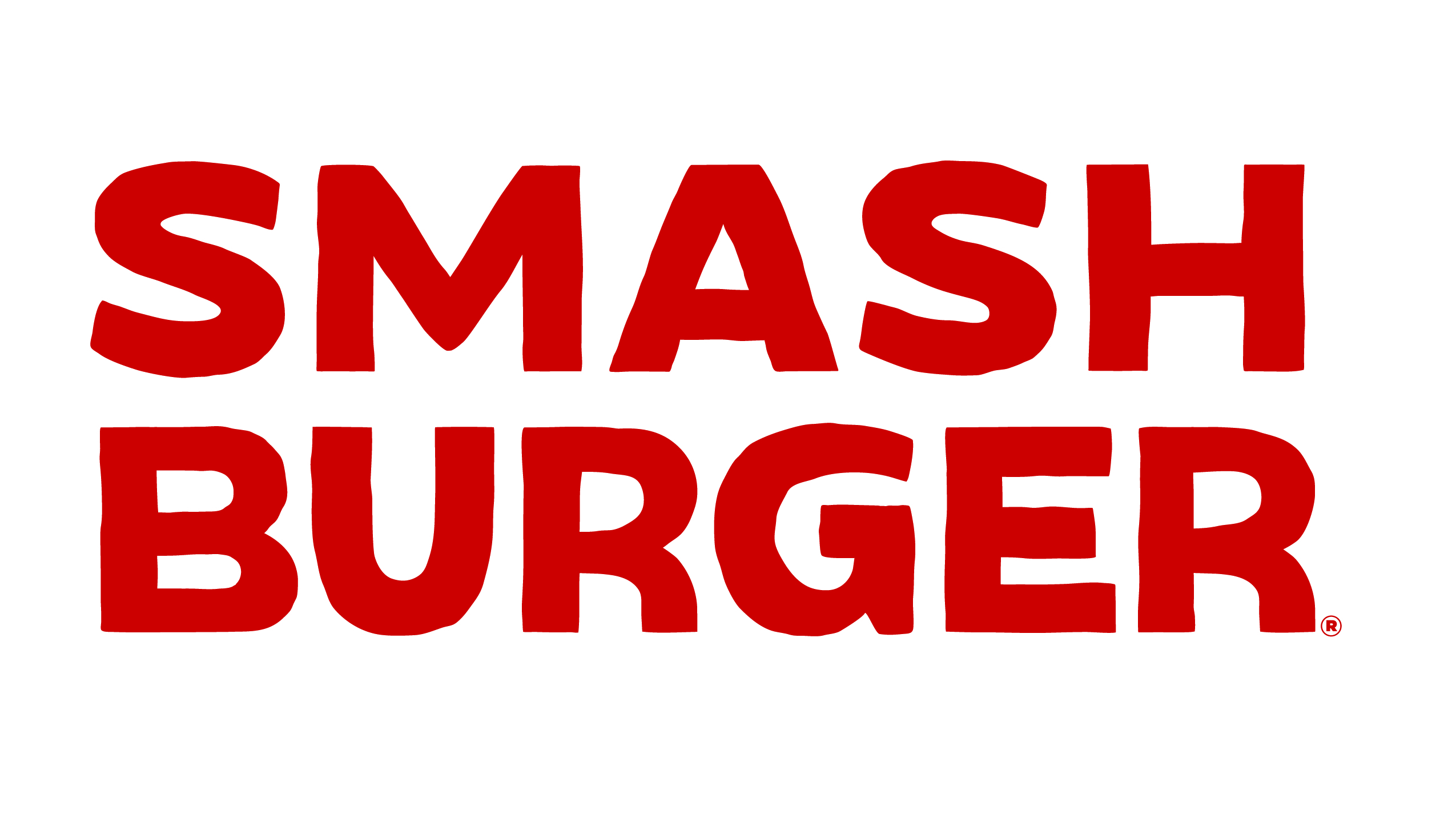
Logo used from 2016 until 2021

=== Creation ===
Smashburger was founded in 2007 by two fast food industry veterans. Tom Ryan had previously helped to develop the stuffed crust pizza concept for Pizza Hut and later served as chief concept officer for McDonald's, and Rich Schaden was a former owner of Quiznos. The two launched the venture with private equity firm Consumer Capital Partners. The restaurant was envisioned to highlight a higher market for hamburgers, as a part of a wave of "better burger" restaurants including Shake Shack, which uses similar techniques. It adopted the name Smashburger, Ryan later said, because the name "had this really great hand-crafted connotation, which we do. It also kind of had this organic, earthy, commonly popular approach, and it had a little edginess to it, for younger [generation] people." Ryan has a Ph.D. in flavor and fragrance technology and lipid toxicology from Michigan State University.

With $15 million in capital, the two bought a Denver restaurant, Icon Burger, to experiment with cooking and management techniques for a higher-end burger restaurant. The founders then spent six months developing an efficient and fast "kitchen engine", designing the restaurant's kitchen to have modular surfaces, and with a central griddle that houses a refrigerated area underneath where meatballs are stored. This allows the burger cook to be properly supplied without having to walk away from the griddle. The kitchen concept was later adapted and standardized for every Smashburger location. The restaurant's signature "smashing" technique is achieved with a special cutter and technique, which also allows it to train new cooks quickly and open new locations without having to redesign the back-end process. They used flattop grills for the kitchen and rejected char broilers or barbecue grills, and the founders did a blind taste test of 300 kinds of beef, including varieties of Wagyu and Kobe, for the burgers before settling on chopped Angus beef. During the taste testing, the founders systematically narrowed the choices of beef based on test results; when only four beef types remained, they found that all were Angus beef from different distributors.

=== Growth ===
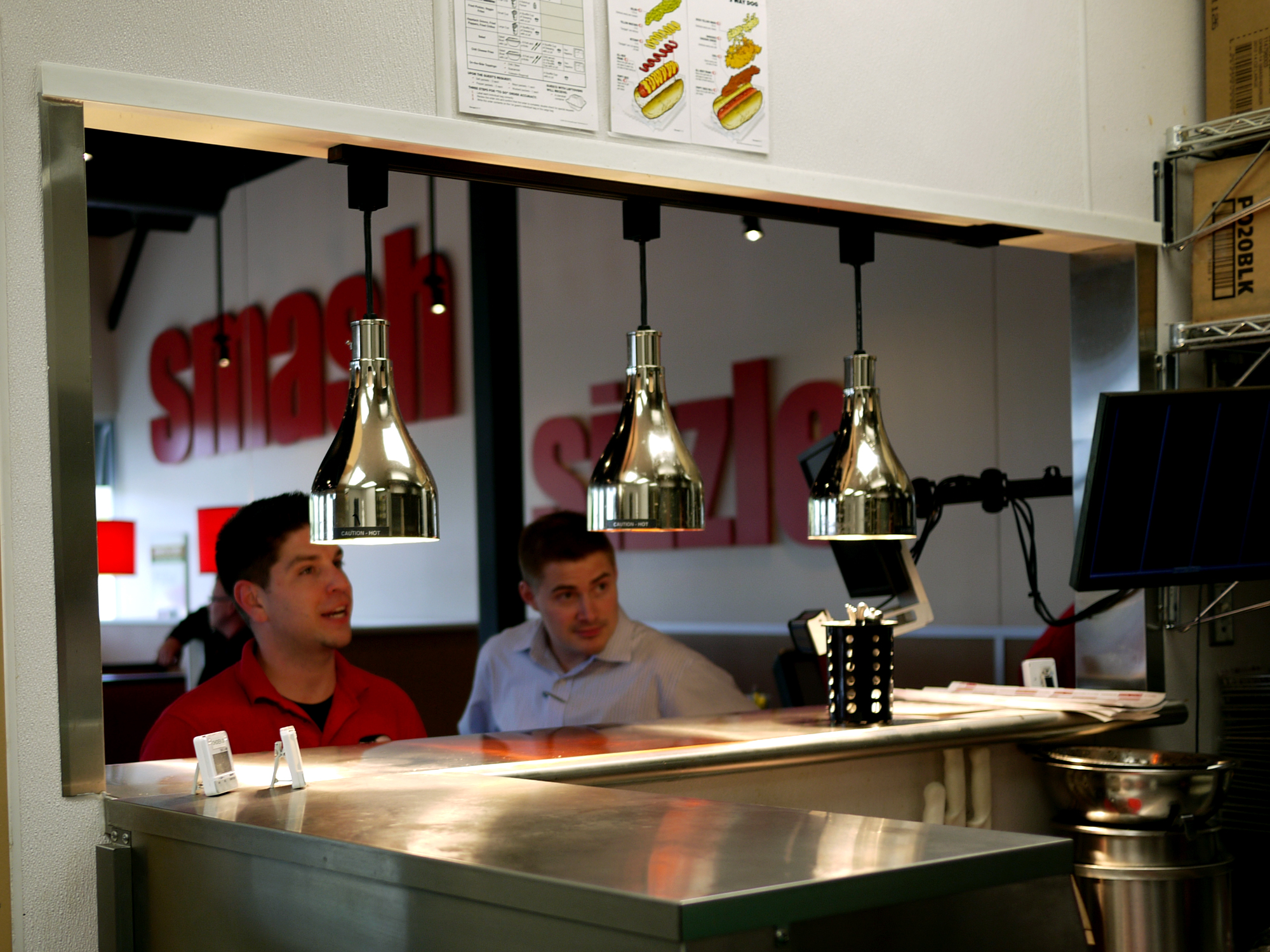
Inside the kitchen of a Smashburger restaurant in Cincinnati (closed in 2022)

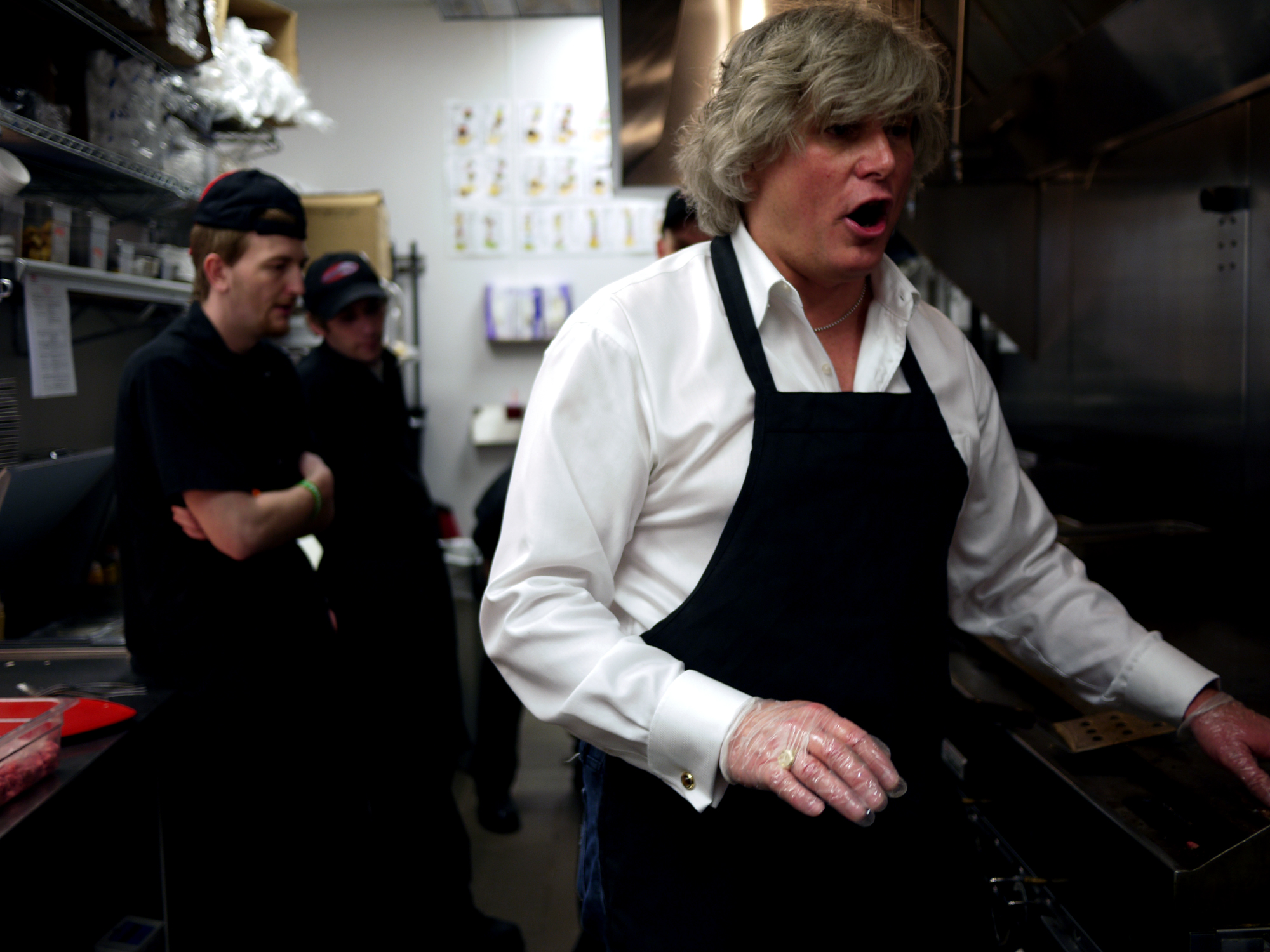
Tom Ryan, co-founder of Smashburger, in the kitchen of a Cincinnati restaurant in 2013 (closed in 2022)

With David Prokupek as CEO and Ryan focusing on developing the menu, the restaurant was designed with quick scalability in mind. The first Smashburger restaurant opened in Denver in June 2007, and the chain then expanded to Houston, and then to Minneapolis, areas where Ryan and other founding management were familiar with the local real estate market.

Marketing for the restaurants focused on the customizability of the menu, freshness of ingredients, and features to give each restaurant a local feel. The chain's first marketing revolved around the tagline "Smash, sizzle, savor". In 2011, as the business was growing at a steady clip, it shifted its theme to "Smashed Fresh. Served Delicious." The restaurant identified 14 distinct customer archetypes to pursue based on income levels, geography, education and lifestyle. While it initially relied heavily on social media to build its brand, the company started television and radio advertising in 2013 with Denver-based Definite Productions as a marketing manager. It later hired one of the executives from that company as chief marketing officer.

The restaurant chain grew to 143 locations, half of which are franchises, and it had $54 million in annual revenue by the end of 2011. That year, it was reported to have as many as 450 franchise agreements in the books. That year it announced plans to open new locations around airports in Kuwait, Saudi Arabia and Bahrain through franchises. It had grown to 170 locations around the world by 2013, and $228 million in revenue. In 2014 it grew to 256 locations and $300 million in revenue. It had grown to 312 stores with 7,000 employees in early 2015. In mid-2016 this had grown to 365 locations. That year, the company announced a franchise agreement with Pearl Investments LLC to open 26 new locations in the United Arab Emirates and Qatar. By mid-2017, this had grown to 380 locations in 38 U.S. states and nine countries, of which 220 were company owned and the rest were franchises.

The success of Smashburger and other specialty burger restaurants is credited with taking market share from major fast food brands like McDonald's, even with Smashburger's burgers selling at higher prices. Where McDonald's was considered the market leader for casual dining, it saw a sales drop of 2.4 percent and a 15 percent drop in net income in 2014, the first decline in those figures in 33 years. Changed consumer tastes, in particular Smashburger's popularity, was credited, because of a customer perception that Smashburger's food was of higher quality and more customizable. Still, Smashburger commands a relatively small portion of the larger U.S. market for burgers. The restaurant had an estimated 0.2 percent U.S. market share in 2014, compared to 1.4 percent for Five Guys and a combined 71 percent for McDonald's, Wendy's and Burger King.

=== Acquisition by Jollibee ===
Growing quickly, Smashburger was by 2013 considered an attractive prospect for an IPO. That year, it secured a $35 million debt facility from Golub Capital. This capital, in addition to the revenue generated by business operations, was thought to support two or three years worth of expansion by the chain. Its CEO said, though, that converting to a public company was a possibility for the company over the long-term. In 2015, Smashburger CEO Scott Crane again suggested the company could prepare for its own IPO at some point, saying it had until that point grown 20 to 25 percent and that it was adding 60 to 80 restaurants a year.

In October 2015, the Philippine-based quick-service operator Jollibee Group announced that it had acquired a 40 percent stake in Smashburger for $100 million, in a deal that gave the chain an enterprise value of $335 million. Its CEO said the decision to sell would mean more stable long-term growth as opposed to relying on the stock market, which could be unpredictable. Following this, Smashburger began additional advertising, renegotiated leases for some of its restaurants and launched a subscription-based rewards program platform called Smash Pass in order to increase customer traffic. The chain also introduced Apple Pay, as well as offering specials like a pass that allows customers to buy a $1 burger a day for 54 days in a bid to build loyalty. It also introduced new menu items including a turkey burger, tater tots and a "triple double", although the latter prompted a copyright infringement lawsuit from In-n-Out Burger, as well as a class-action lawsuit for false advertising.

The restaurant faced difficulties in continuing to grow, in part as shoppers began to shift away from shopping in traditional retail centers where its restaurants were concentrated. At the same time, larger restaurant chains increased their efforts to grow sales and brought on higher-quality menu items to compete with Smashburger and restaurants like it. Subsequently, Smashburger saw its overall same-store sales decline as a number of other local "better burger" concepts grew. Crane left as CEO in April 2016, and was replaced by Mike Nolan, but he resigned nine months later and Ryan took over the role. The restaurant thus condensed its expansion strategy to focus on existing markets and began mentorship programs to develop leadership talent from within its ranks of workers. It also bought back some franchise restaurants in several major markets. Smashburger competitors like Shake Shack and Five Guys experienced many of these difficulties, as well.

In 2016, Smashburger was estimated to have $338.3 million in sales. On 13 February 2018, Jollibee increased its ownership stake to 85 percent of Smashburger in another $100 million deal. In making the acquisition, the companies said the move would allow Smashburger to further expand its presence in southeast Asia. On 14 December 2018, Jollibee increased its ownership stake to 100%, full ownership of Smashburger in a $10 million deal.

== Restaurants ==
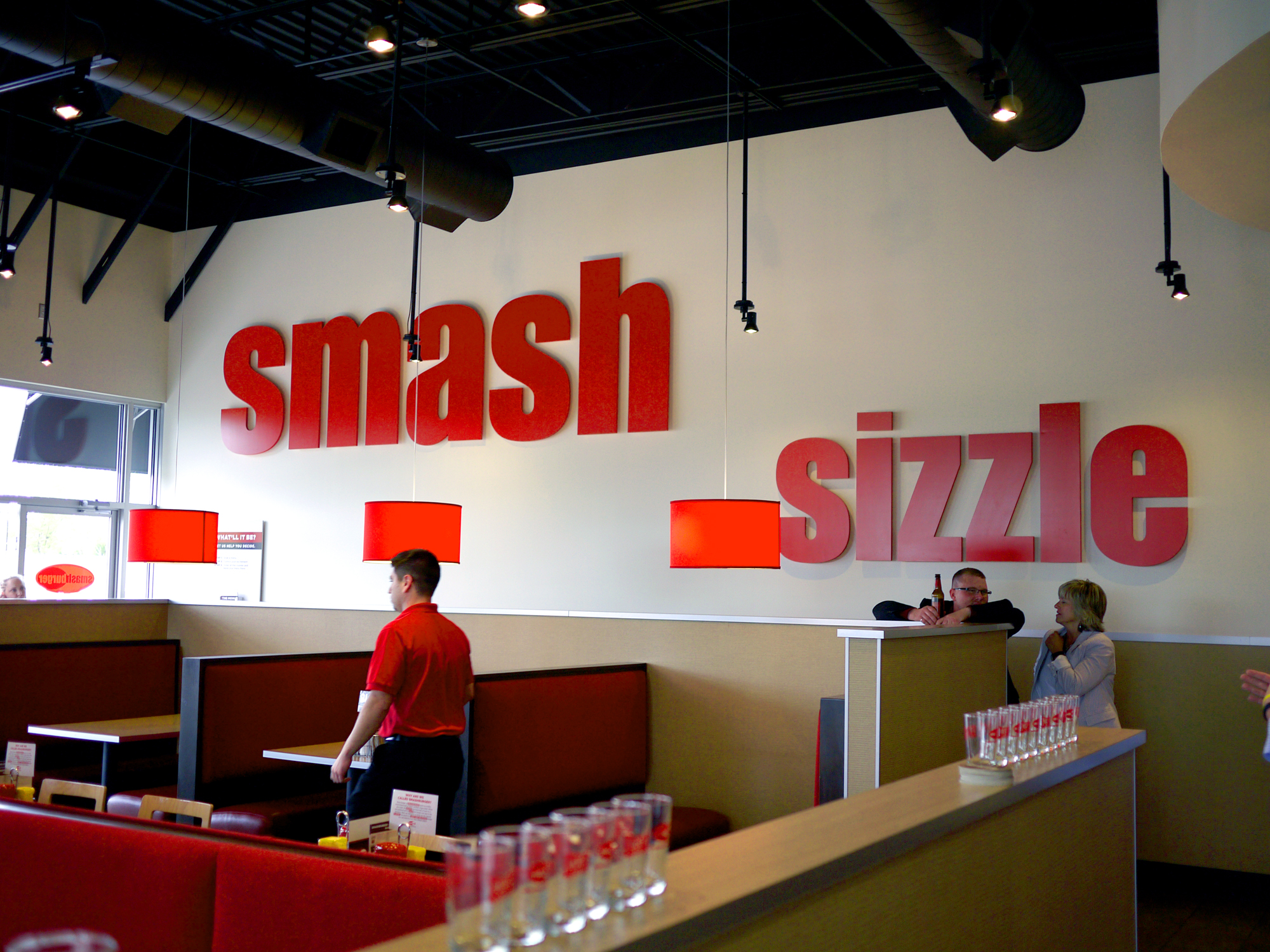
A Smashburger restaurant in Cincinnati, Ohio (closed in 2022)

Smashburger uses market research to determine where to open new restaurants, and the restaurant has favored opening new locations next to many major college campuses in the United States, sometimes opening shops directly on campus which are run by concessionaire companies like Compass Group and Aramark. It has also sought to open locations in casinos, in particular signing agreements in casinos in Las Vegas and in Oklahoma. It has also opened locations in high-traffic airports as well, partnering with HMSHost. A typical Smashburger location sees $3,000 to $5,000 in revenue during a mealtime rush, but its highest-volume restaurants can see $3 million to $5 million a year in sales.

Ryan integrated ambiance, decor and music as a part of a larger customer experience. Restaurants are designed with specific decor, a prominently bright red color scheme, and customer flow. But, the restaurant does not have a model footprint and so each location can be tailored to the available space. Restaurant interiors are designed in a modern style with indirect lighting and decorated with locally produced photo murals. Customers order at a central counter and food is brought to them in stainless steel baskets. They are given silverware to eat with in place of plasticware. Restaurants are designed with a social feel in mind, and feature high tables and low tables, booths, and an outdoor patio.

The company has a tailored music soundtrack for restaurants as well. An internal team designed and built the initial soundtracks around the restaurant's "Smash, sizzle, savor" theme. As Smashburger began to grow, management brought in outside consultants in 2011 to develop a new program for music that would better fit a "modern, high-energy" restaurant concept, although it retains a family-friendly vibe. Music in restaurants was subsequently designed with a target audience of 32 years old, avoiding overly bubblegum or electronic music and rooted in contemporary pop, allowing its sound track to remain mainstream but allowing for older classics as well as new and emerging international music. International locations feature an American-inspired soundtrack as well.

The company also has employee incentives for stores it owns directly which it credits with boosting morale, including paying $9 an hour in 2011, above the then-minimum wage of $7.25. Bonuses are awarded for certain milestones as well. Cooks are awarded extra money for filling orders in under six minutes, while managers are given bonuses for meeting monthly revenue goals and gaining positive customer reviews.

=== Awards ===
The restaurant chain was named "America's Most Promising Company" in 2011 by Forbes. In 2014, it again made this list coming in at number 6 for "America's Most Promising Companies". In 2017 the chain was named the number 9 favorite burger restaurant brand in America by The Harris Poll's annual EquiTrend Study. Crane was named one of "10 Executives to Watch" by Nation's Restaurant News during his tenure at the company.

== Menu ==
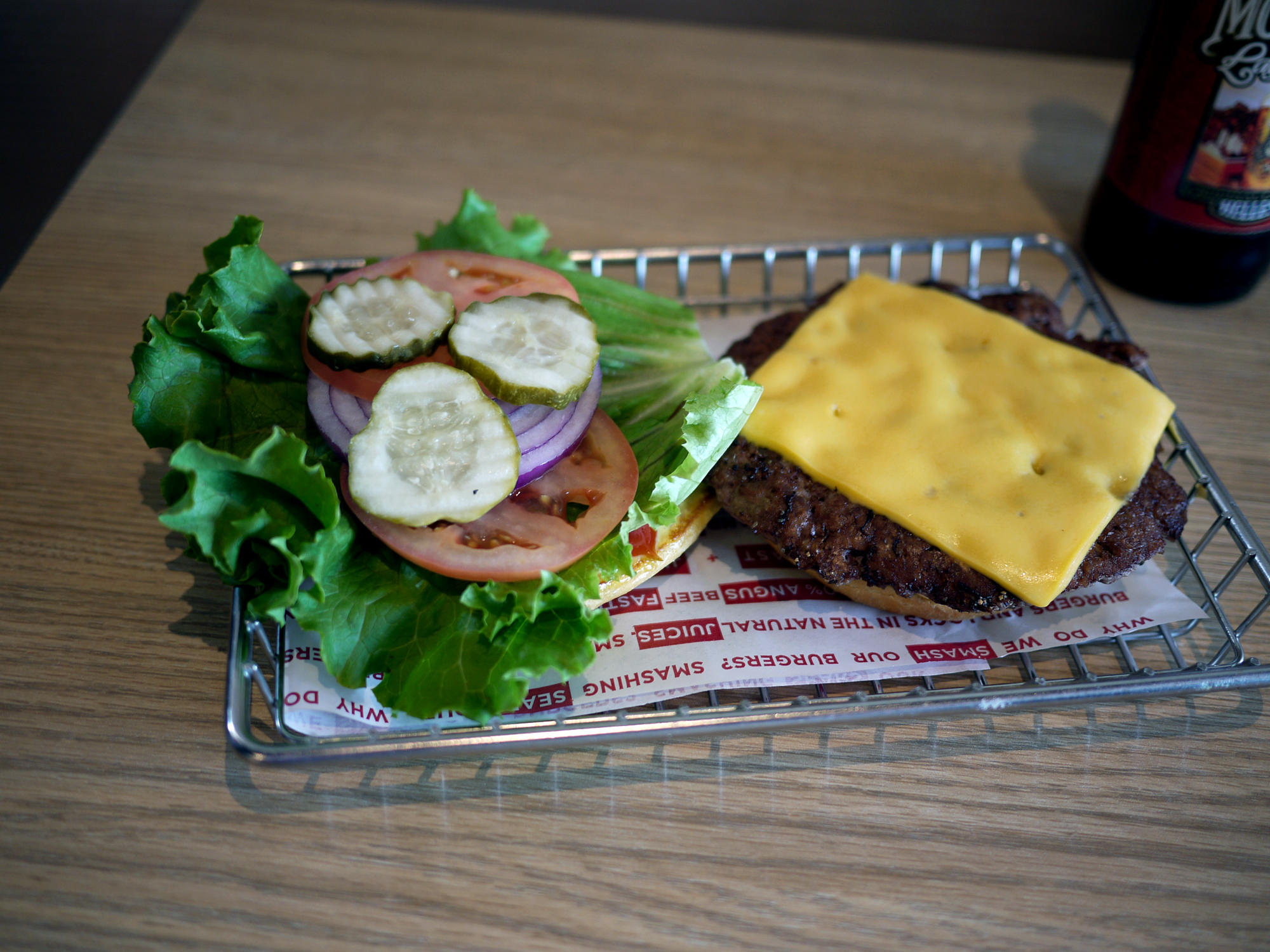
A Smashburger with standard toppings in a location in Cincinnati (closed in 2022)

Smashburger's menu focuses primarily on burgers, chicken sandwiches, black bean burgers and salads, with a variety of toppings and options that can be customized to a customer's taste. The company also offers a number of sides, including french fries, sweet potato fries, fried onions, and fried pickles, and "smash fries" which are topped with rosemary and olive oil. Many of the sandwiches are topped with an in-house "smash sauce" made with mayonnaise, mustard, pickles and lemon juice. Smashburger's main dessert item is a milkshake made with Häagen-Dazs ice cream. About 20 milkshakes are sold per 100 burgers.

The chain experimented with a breakfast menu for a time but it found this to be unprofitable, accounting for just 10 percent of its revenue but 30 percent of expenses. Some of its specialized locations such as those in casinos do continue to offer breakfast menus. Smashburger also attempted a system for customers to fill out menu cards as they waited in line which was not successful.

=== Burger technique ===
The restaurant's burgers are created using chopped Angus beef chuck steak cut into thin slices. Fast food restaurants more typically use ground beef to form burger patties. It also markets its meat as "fresh, never frozen" and the beef is transported in 10-pound (4.5 kg) portions from distribution sites to restaurants each morning. There, employees divide the beef into loosely packed meatballs by hand. The burger meatball contains a bouillon-like flavoring and it is also seasoned with a proprietary blend that includes kosher salt, black pepper, and garlic, shortly before cooking. Meanwhile, the burger buns are made using a compression toaster and butter wheel so that they do not become too soggy once a patty is placed on them.

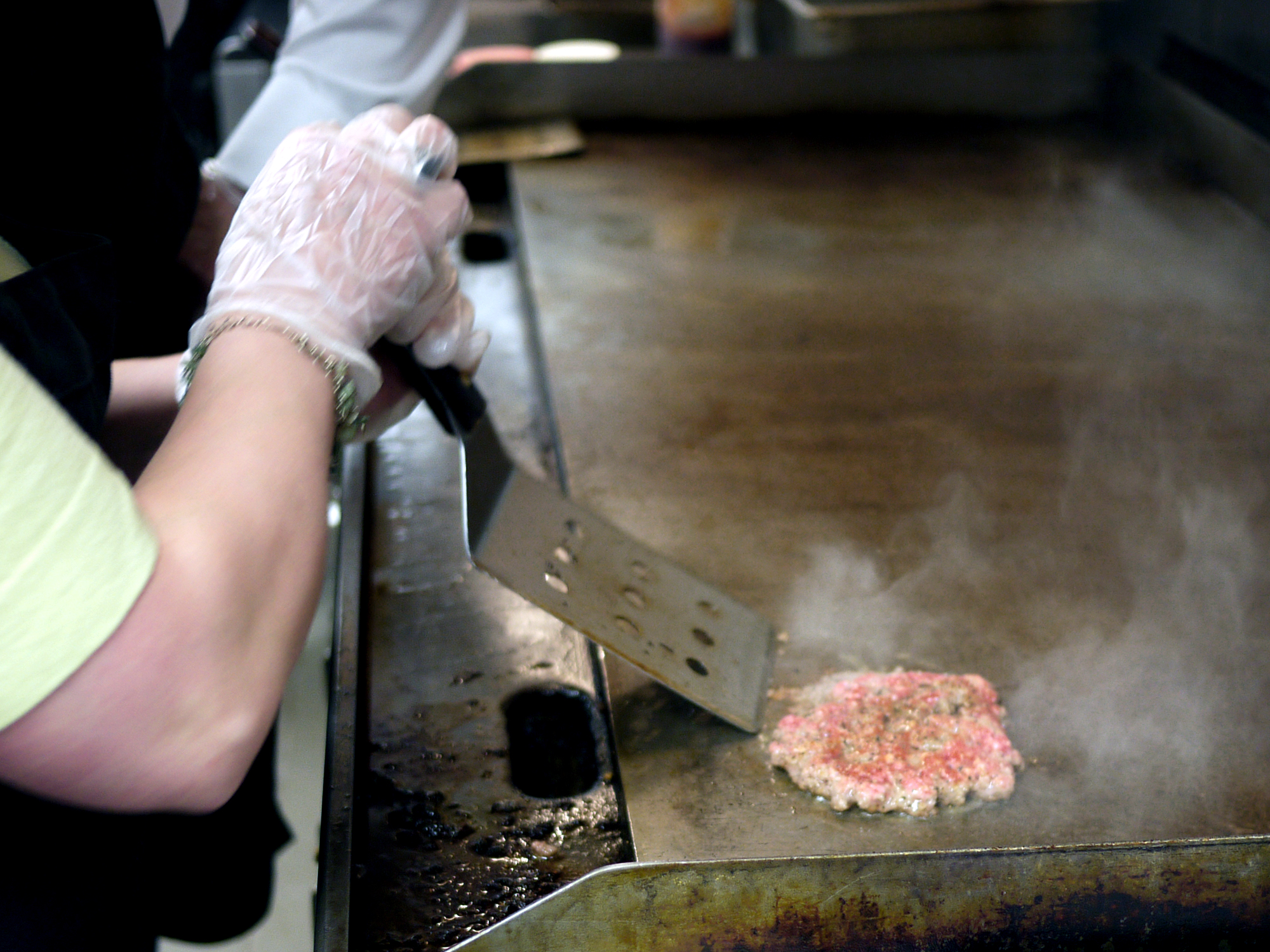
An employee "smashes" a burger in the kitchen of a Smashburger restaurant in Cincinnati (closed in 2022).

Burgers are produced in a made-to-order format, with Smashburger's smashing technique achieved by placing the meatball on a griddle heated to 385 °F (196 °C) and pressing it hard using a special tool for 10 seconds to flatten it. Burgers typically are not further pressed after they have begun to cook; once the patty is heated to the point that fat begins to melt, pressing the burger will squeeze the juices out and cause it to dry out. The technique caramelizes the bottom of the patty onto the buttered griddle and locks the juices into the burger, preventing them from escaping and marinating the burger in its own juices. Smashburger's smashing technique also lets it cook burgers in three minutes, where a traditional burger can take up to eight minutes to cook. During mealtime rushes, this also means customers cycle through the tables in the restaurant more quickly and each table can turn three successive groups of guests per hour instead of two.

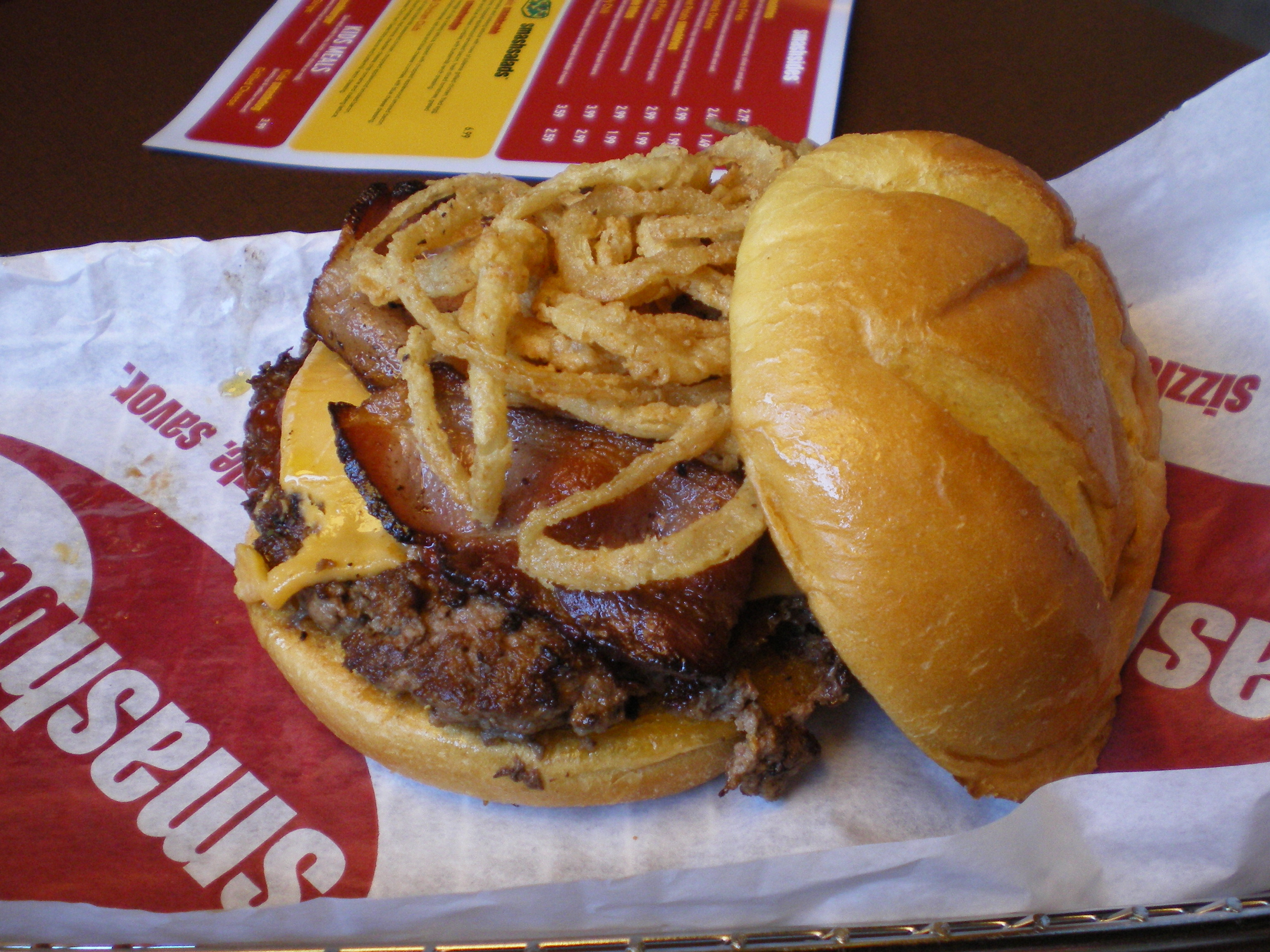
A BBQ bacon cheddar burger with deep-fried onions on top, another core menu item

In order to avoid the stigma of a restaurant chain, Smashburger crafts local burgers for each city where it is located and markets them extensively. These burgers are designed after consulting with distributors for the kinds of ingredients that are most shipped to a particular city or geographic area. For instance, Smashburger's Colorado locations serve burgers with roasted green chiles, while locations in Miami serve burgers with grilled chorizo. In Minneapolis, the chain has a double-cheese, double-onion variety evoking Scandinavian and Germanic cuisine. Its Oklahoma variety features locally popular fried pickles, while Boston locations serve a burger with onions and a cranberry chutney supplied locally by Ocean Spray. The burgers tend to be original creations as opposed to duplicating local flavors; in the case of Minneapolis the chain deliberately avoided selling a burger that would resemble the locally renowned Jucy Lucy. There are exceptions, such as in Kalamazoo and Grand Rapids restaurants, where the local burger is topped with olives, a tradition that had once been locally popular.

The restaurant attracted criticism from health experts for the unhealthiness of some of its menu offerings. A large BBQ Bacon and Cheddar Smashburger has 1,050 calories, while a Chocolate Oreo Shake has 950 calories. Initially, the restaurant made only larger burgers and marketed large servings as a value add, but as it grew it began to offer different sizes to appeal to a larger audience. In order to appeal to people who are health-conscious and people who want less-expensive meals, the chain now offers burgers in 1/4 pound (113 g), 1/3 pound (151 g) and 1/2 pound (227 g) varieties.

=== Local beer and ingredient pairings ===
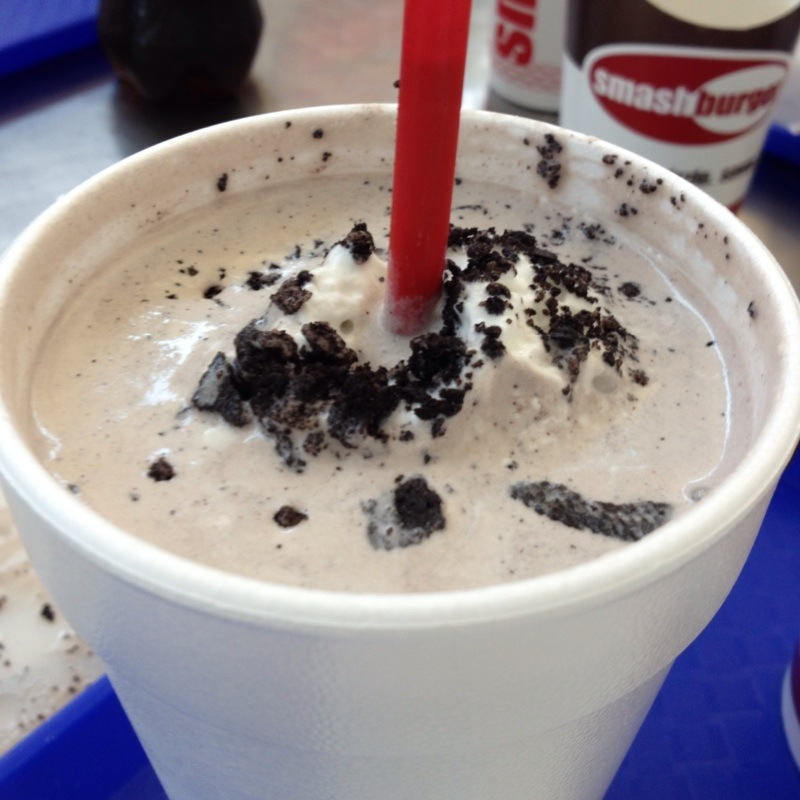
An Oreo milkshake at Smashburger, which is made with Häagen-Dazs ice cream

Smashburger sources its ingredients from producers local to its stores, where possible. Chicago-based locations serve burgers made with Sweet Baby Ray's barbecue sauce, while Tennessee burgers use Jack Daniel's BBQ sauce, Florida locations use barbecue sauce containing orange juice, New Orleans locations have a barbecue sauce containing Barq's syrup and Utah locations serve honey barbecue. Telera rolls are used as buns in California restaurants, pretzel buns are served in Chicago restaurants, onion rolls in Minnesota restaurants and brioche in New York restaurants.

In 2012, the company launched a program to partner with regional craft beer breweries to serve local beers to pair with its burgers and sandwiches. It promoted the new program with tasting events featuring bloggers and local media. In this program, each burger on Smashburger's menu is paired with a specific beer from the brewer, which is then sold in restaurant locations in that area. The partnerships caused a 30 to 50 percent increase in beer sales in stores, Ryan later said. About 15 to 20 percent of all orders now include a beer order. Among the breweries Smashburger partners with (as of 2016) are Deep Ellum Brewing Co. in Dallas, Summit Brewing Co. in Minneapolis, Sixpoint Brewery in New York, and Christian Moerlein Brewing Co. in Cincinnati.

== See also ==
- List of hamburger restaurants
