= List of hamburgers =

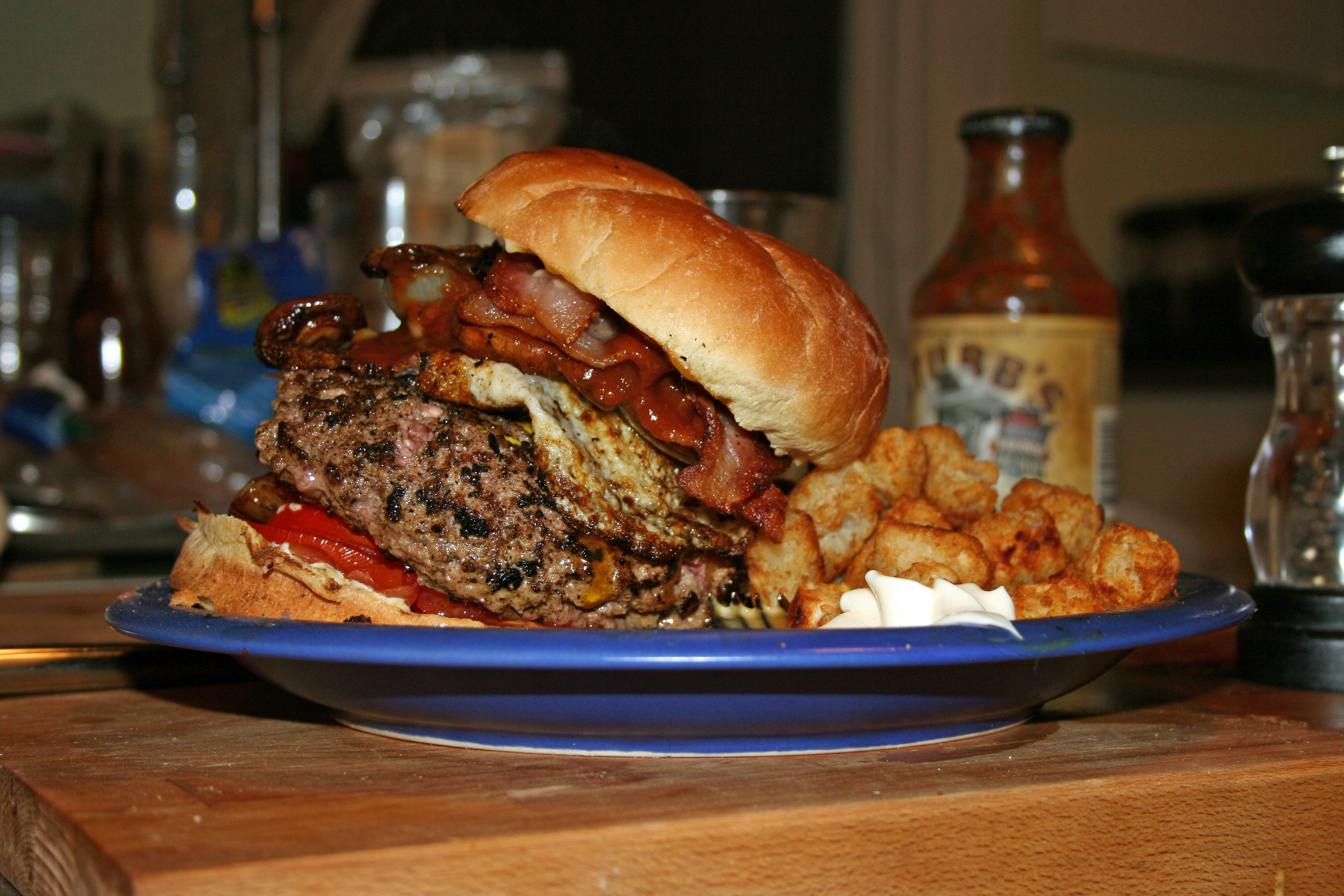
A homemade gourmet hamburger with bacon

This is a list of notable hamburger variants. A hamburger typically consists of a cooked patty of ground meat usually placed between two slices of a bread roll. Hamburgers are often served with other toppings and condiments. There are many types of regional hamburgers with significant variations.

== Hamburgers ==
Name	Image	Origin	Description
50/50 burger		California, United States	Half ground bacon, half ground beef burger patty developed by Scott Slater for Slater's 50/50 restaurant. Another variety is half kangaroo meat and half bacon.
Afghani burger		Afghanistan	Also known as the Kabuli burger or the Ayatollah Burger, an Afghan fast food wrap consisting of a piece of Afghan bread rolled around french fries, along with chutney and other condiments, vegetables, and often sausages or other meat.
Angus burger		Aberdeen Angus cattle originate in the counties of Aberdeenshire and Angus in Scotland	A hamburger made using beef from Angus cattle. The name "Angus burger" is used by several fast-food hamburger chains for one or more "premium" burgers; however, it does not belong to any single company. Pre-made frozen Angus burgers are increasingly available from retailers.
Aussie burger/Kiwiburger		Australasia	Popular regional hamburger ingredients in Australia and New Zealand include canned beetroot, pineapple and a fried egg. Pictured is a burger with slices of canned beetroot within it.
Bacon cheeseburger		An A&W Restaurants store in Lansing, Michigan in 1963	Hamburger with bacon and cheese is a bacon cheeseburger, which became an official menu item at an A&W Restaurant owned by Dale Mulder in Lansing, Michigan, in 1963. Hamburgers with bacon but no cheese may be referred to as bacon burgers.
Banquet burger		Toronto, Canada	Cookbook author Kathleen Sloan-McIntosh credits Francis Deck as the inventor of this burger, stating its original name was the Forest Hill burger. Similar to a bacon cheeseburger, this burger is often served open-faced, with the hamburger patty, cheese, and bacon on a flat bottom bun next to the top rounded bun containing the lettuce, tomato, and onion slices. The ground beef contains black pepper, Worcestershire sauce, and grated onion. Condiments used are mayonnaise, mustard, ketchup, and dill pickles.
Bøfsandwich		Denmark	Classic Danish take on a hamburger. It contains the hamburger elements of a cooked ground beef patty placed inside a sliced bread roll. Bøfsandwiches are traditionally sold from hotdog stands and other fast food establishments, but some traditional Danish restaurants have started serving gourmet versions.
Butter burger		Most likely first served in 1936 at Solly's Grille in Milwaukee	In the Upper Midwest, particularly Wisconsin, burgers are often made with a buttered bun, butter as one of the ingredients of the patty or with a pat of butter on top of the burger patty.
Buffalo burger		New York	Prepared with meat from the American bison, buffalo burgers have less cholesterol, less fat, and fewer calories than beef hamburgers and chicken hamburgers. The American Heart Association recommended buffalo burgers in 1997 as more heart-healthy than chicken or beef.
California burger		California	In the Western U.S., a "California" burger most often consists of a normal cheeseburger, with the addition of bacon and either guacamole or avocado. In the Eastern U.S., a California burger is traditionally a burger with lettuce, tomato, and raw onion.
Carolina burger		North Carolina, United States	In portions of the Carolinas, a Carolina-style hamburger "with everything" may be served with cheese, chili, onions, mustard, and cole slaw. Common in local restaurants in the Carolinas, it is also periodically offered at Wendy's restaurants as the Carolina Classic.
Cheeseburger		United States	Hamburger accompanied with melted cheese. The term itself is a portmanteau of the words "cheese" and "hamburger". The cheese is usually sliced, then added a short time before the hamburger finishes cooking to allow it to melt. In fast food restaurants, the cheese that is added to a cheeseburger is typically American cheese, but there are many other variations. Mozzarella, blue cheese, Swiss cheese, pepper jack, and especially cheddar are popular choices.
Chili burger		Thomas M. "Ptomaine Tommy" DeForest appears to have developed the chili burger in the 1920s	Consists of a hamburger, with the patty topped with chili con carne
Chimichurris		Dominican Republic	Ground beef, chicken, or pork leg served on pan de agua and garnished with cabbage and salsa rosa.
Chori burger		Merly's BBQ, a street food stall in Boracay, Philippines	A Filipino hamburger characteristically made with chorizo (longganisa) patties, banana ketchup, mayonnaise, and atchara, in addition to tomatoes and lettuce. It was first popularized by Merly's BBQ, a street food stall in the island of Boracay in the Philippines.
Coconut burger		Philippines	Also known as sapal burger or niyog burger, this is a Filipino veggie burger made with shredded coconut pulp (sapal), which are the by-products of traditional coconut milk extraction in Filipino cuisine.
Fat Boy		Greek burger restaurants in Winnipeg, Manitoba, in the 1950s.	The Fat Boy commonly consists of one or more patties, topped with a distinct chili sauce, quartered dill pickles, tomatoes, lettuce and a large amount of mayonnaise and mustard with fresh-cut fries.
Green chile burger		Historical creator is unclear; both the Owl Bar & Grill and the Buckhorn Tavern in San Antonio, New Mexico, were serving them circa 1945	Burger topped with roasted New Mexico green chiles. Many places around New Mexico serve variations of this burger.
Guber burger		The Wheel Inn Drive-In in Sedalia, Missouri	Burger topped with peanut butter
Hamdog		Invented in 2004 by Australian Mark Murray and patented in 2009. The Hamdog received global media recognition in late 2016 as the world's only patented and trademarked burger.	Australian invention that consists of a special combination hamburger and hotdog bun. A meat patty is split in half and has a sausage run through the middle. It is then topped just as a conventional burger.
Islak Burger		Taksim Square, Turkey	A Turkish street food composed of a hamburger soaked in tomato sauce. Popular around Taksim Square in Turkey.
Jucy Lucy		Two bars on the same street in South Minneapolis both claim to have invented the sandwich: Matt's Bar and the 5-8 Club.	A cheeseburger that has the cheese inside the meat patty rather than on top. A piece of cheese is surrounded by raw meat and cooked until it melts, resulting in a molten core of cheese within the patty.
Kimchi burger		It has been stated that Uncle Joe's Hamburger of Seoul, South Korea, was the inventor of the kimchi burger	A hamburger that includes kimchi in its preparation
Louis' Lunch burger		A hamburger served at Louis' Lunch restaurant in New Haven, Connecticut that claims to be the first restaurant to serve hamburgers as well as the oldest operating hamburger restaurant in the United States.	A hamburger made with ground steak made from a blend of five cuts of beef, vertically flame broiled, then served on two square pieces of toasted white bread.
Luther Burger		The origin is disputed. According to legend, the burger was named for and was a favorite (and possible invention) of musician Luther Vandross. The Daily Telegraph reported that Mulligan's, a suburban bar in Decatur, Georgia, may be progenitor of the burger when the owner substituted the doughnuts when running out of buns.	Hamburger or cheeseburger prepared with one or more glazed doughnuts in place of the bun
Office Burger		Served at the Father's Office chain of gastropubs in Los Angeles, California. The Office Burger was called by Esquire one of the best burgers in the world.	A burger of dry-aged beef, blue cheese and Gruyère cheese, caramelized onions, applewood bacon compote and served on a toasted oblong shaped French baguette. Father's Office has a no-modification policy for the Office Burger that will not allow substitutions or add-ons of any kind such as ketchup.
Oklahoma onion burger		Oklahoma, United States	A burger with a large amount of thinly sliced onions piled on top of the ground beef before smashing the patty into the grill to embed the onions in the beef. It was conceived of during The Great Depression in Western Oklahoma as a way for local diners to stretch ground beef.
Olive burger		Lansing, Michigan	A burger topped with "olive sauce", a mixture of chopped green olives and mayonnaise. Most likely originating at Weston's Kewpee Sandwich Shop in the 1920s, olive burgers are a popular local fast food burger in the Lansing metropolitan area.
Pastrami burger		Popularized by Crown Burgers of Utah in 1978.	A burger with cheese and thin-sliced pastrami on top, commonly served at Greek burger restaurants in Utah.
Patty melt		United States	Hamburger sandwich consisting of a ground beef patty, pieces of sautéed or grilled onion and Cheddar or Swiss cheese between two slices of bread (traditionally rye, though sourdough is sometimes substituted).
Ramen burger		Created at Smorgasburg in Williamsburg, Brooklyn,New York City U.S. by Keizo Shimamoto	Burger in between two hardened cakes of ramen noodles acting as the bun.
Rice burger		Created in Japan by MOS Burger	Style of hamburger in which the bun is a compressed cake of rice. The MOS Burger fast-food restaurant chain introduced the rice burger in 1987, and it has since become a popular food item in East Asia.
Roujiamo		Shaanxi, China	Pork belly or a beef with spices, served in a baked bun. Popular in Shaanxi.
Salmon burger		United States	Fishcake made mostly from salmon in the style of a hamburger. Salmon burgers are especially common in Alaska where they are routinely offered as an alternative to beef hamburgers.
Slider		According to the earliest citations, the name originated aboard U.S. Navy ships, due to the way greasy burgers slid across the galley grill while the ship pitched and rolled. Other versions claim the term "slider" originated from the hamburgers served by flight line galleys at military airfields, which were so greasy they slid right through one; or because their small size allows them to "slide" right down the throat in one or two bites. White Castle trademarked the spelling variant "Slyder" and used it between 1985 and 2009.	Primarily refers to small hamburgers, but can also cover any small sandwich served on a slider roll
Slopper		The slopper originated in 1965 or earlier in Pueblo, Colorado; however, the exact restaurant is disputed. Some say that it was created at Coors Tavern while others argue that it originated at Star Bar.	Cheeseburger or hamburger served open-faced and smothered in red chile, or green chile (aka chile verde or green chile sauce). Sloppers generally include grilled buns and are often topped with freshly chopped onions. Eating a slopper is no easy task. The use of a fork or spoon is essential, but a fork and knife, or fork and spoon combination is recommended.
Slugburger		Northeast Mississippi	Traditional southern delicacy found in northeast Mississippi, particularly Booneville and Corinth. The original recipe was made to help people extend their beef supply, by adding stale bread crumbs to the beef. The name comes from the burger originally costing 5¢, or a nickel (a "slug"). Today, a slugburger is a patty made from a mixture of beef or pork and an inexpensive extender such as soybeans or soy flour, it is deep fried in oil. It is typically served on a bun with mustard, pickles, onion, and in some places with a side of French fries.
Smash burger		United States	For the patty, a ball of ground beef is pressed firmly onto a hot griddle or skillet, creating a thin patty with crisp edges and a browned surface.
Steak burger		United States	Typically prepared with ground, sliced or minced beefsteak meat. Additional meats are also used.
Steamed cheeseburger		Mainly available in central Connecticut. It is believed to have been invented at a restaurant called Jack's Lunch in Middletown, Connecticut in the 1930s.	Instead of being fried in a pan or grilled on a grill, a steamed cheeseburger is steamed in a stainless-steel cabinet containing trays that hold either a hamburger patty or a piece of cheese. This method of cooking makes the fats in the meat melt away, resulting in a moist, juicy burger which is then put on a bun and covered with the melted cheese. Various customary toppings can then be added to the burger.
Tempeh burger		Indonesia	Vegetarian hamburger variant with tempeh (Indonesian fermented soybean cakes) as its main ingredient.
Teriyaki burger		According to George Motz, the burger has Japanese origins. It is popular in Hawaii.	Teriyaki burger (テリヤキバーガー) refers to a variety of hamburger either topped with teriyaki sauce or with the sauce worked into the ground meat patty.
Veggie burger		United States, Canada, Mexico	Veggie burger, garden burger, or tofu burger uses a meat analogue, a meat substitute such as tofu, textured vegetable protein, seitan (wheat gluten), Quorn, beans, grains or an assortment of vegetables, which are ground up and formed into patties.

== See also ==
- History of the hamburger
- History of the hamburger in the United States
- Hot dog variations
- List of beef dishes
- List of hamburger restaurants
- List of sandwiches
- List of steak dishes
