= Smash burger =

Type of hamburger

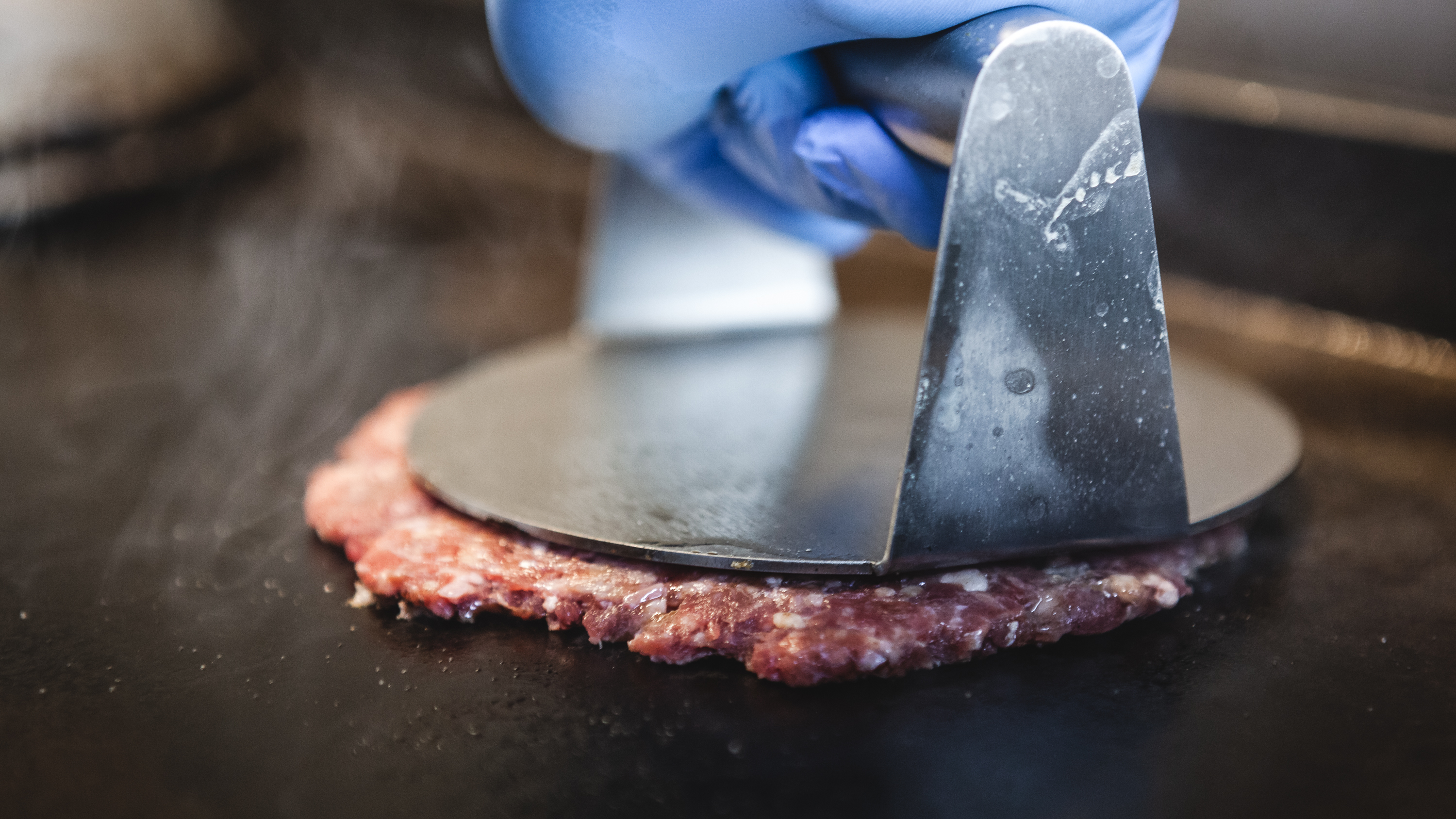
- A smash burger patty being made on a griddle
- Alternative names: Smashburger; Smashed burger
- Type: Hamburger
- Course: Main
- Place of origin: United States
- Associated cuisine: American
- Invented: 1920s–1930s (modern form popularized in 2000s–2010s)
- Serving temperature: Hot
- Main ingredients: Ground beef, bread bun
- Ingredients generally used: Onion, cheese, condiments
- Similar dishes: Steak burger, Butter burger, Veggie burger

A smash burger, also written smashburger, or smashed burger, is a type of hamburger in which a ball of ground beef is pressed firmly onto a hot griddle or skillet, creating a thin patty with crisp edges and a browned surface. The technique maximizes the Maillard reaction, producing a savory crust while keeping the interior juicy.

== Definition and characteristics ==
The Food Network defines a smash burger as:

"A thin beef patty cooked on a super-hot griddle. The burger is smashed down, usually with a spatula, to increase browning and craggy bits on the surface for extra flavor."

The patties are typically cooked quickly, within 90 to 180 seconds, and often served in double or triple stacks. High-fat beef (typically 70–80% lean) is recommended, and the smash should occur once, early in cooking, to avoid pressing out juices.

=== Preparation ===
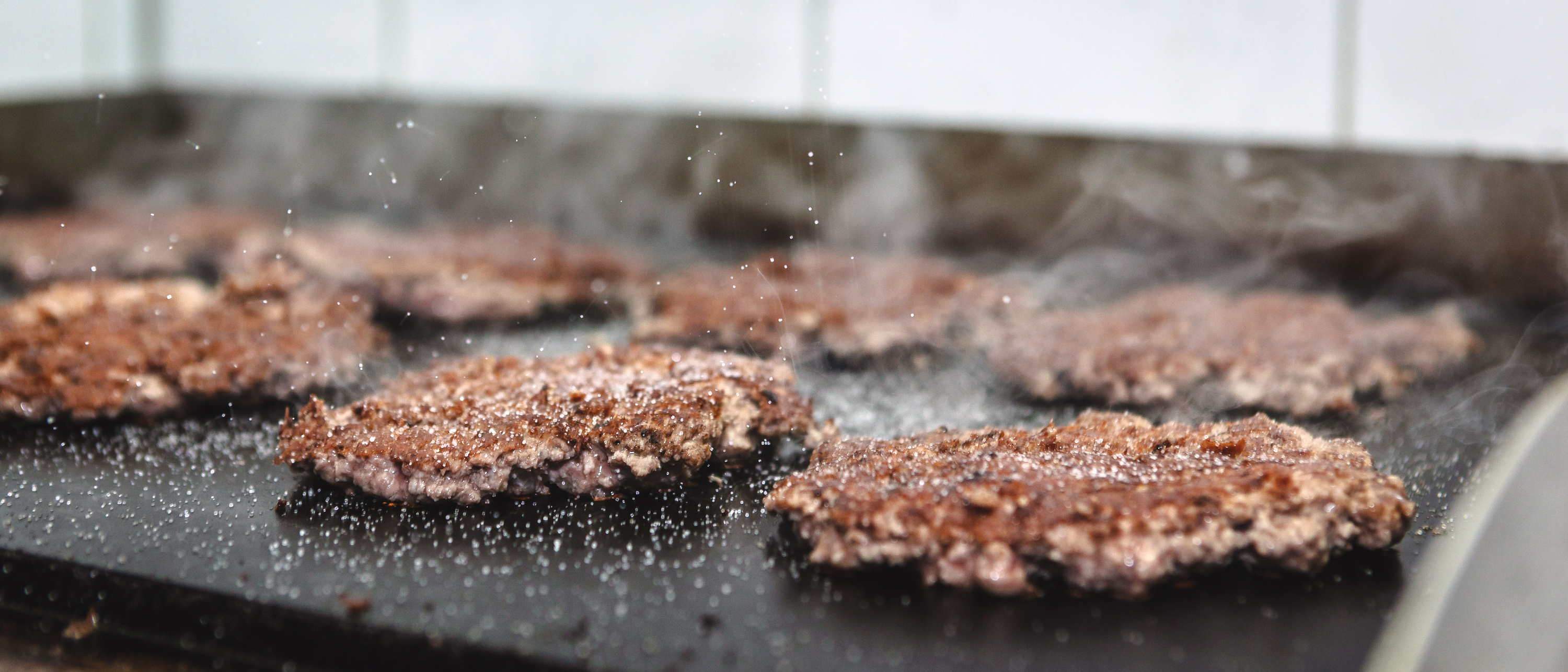
Smash burgers cooking

Smash burgers are made by placing a ball of ground beef, commonly around 3 to 5 oz. (90 to 150 g), onto a hot flat-top grill and pressing it flat with a spatula or burger press. The goal is to maximize surface contact, which increases browning. The technique maximizes the Maillard reaction, producing a savory crust while keeping the interior juicy.

Variations in thickness exist: some restaurants serve extremely thin patties stacked in multiples, while others prepare slightly thicker versions. The ideal fat content is around 30% for moisture retention and flavor. Buns vary regionally, with brioche common in the UK, and potato rolls and milk rolls preferred in the U.S.

== History ==
=== Origins ===
The origins of the smash burger are debated. Food historian George Motz argues that some of the earliest American hamburgers, sold at fairs and factories in the late 19th and early 20th centuries, were thin patties pressed into pans for speed. Others trace the style to the Great Depression, when smashing ground beef was a way to stretch portions cheaply.

A widely cited story credits Dairy Cheer, a diner in Ashland, Kentucky, where in the 1960s a cook reportedly used a bean can to press beef balls onto the griddle, creating the crisp, thin patty that became known as a smash burger. Miner-Dunn, a restaurant in Indiana, has also claimed continuous service of smash burgers since the 1930s.

=== Popularization ===
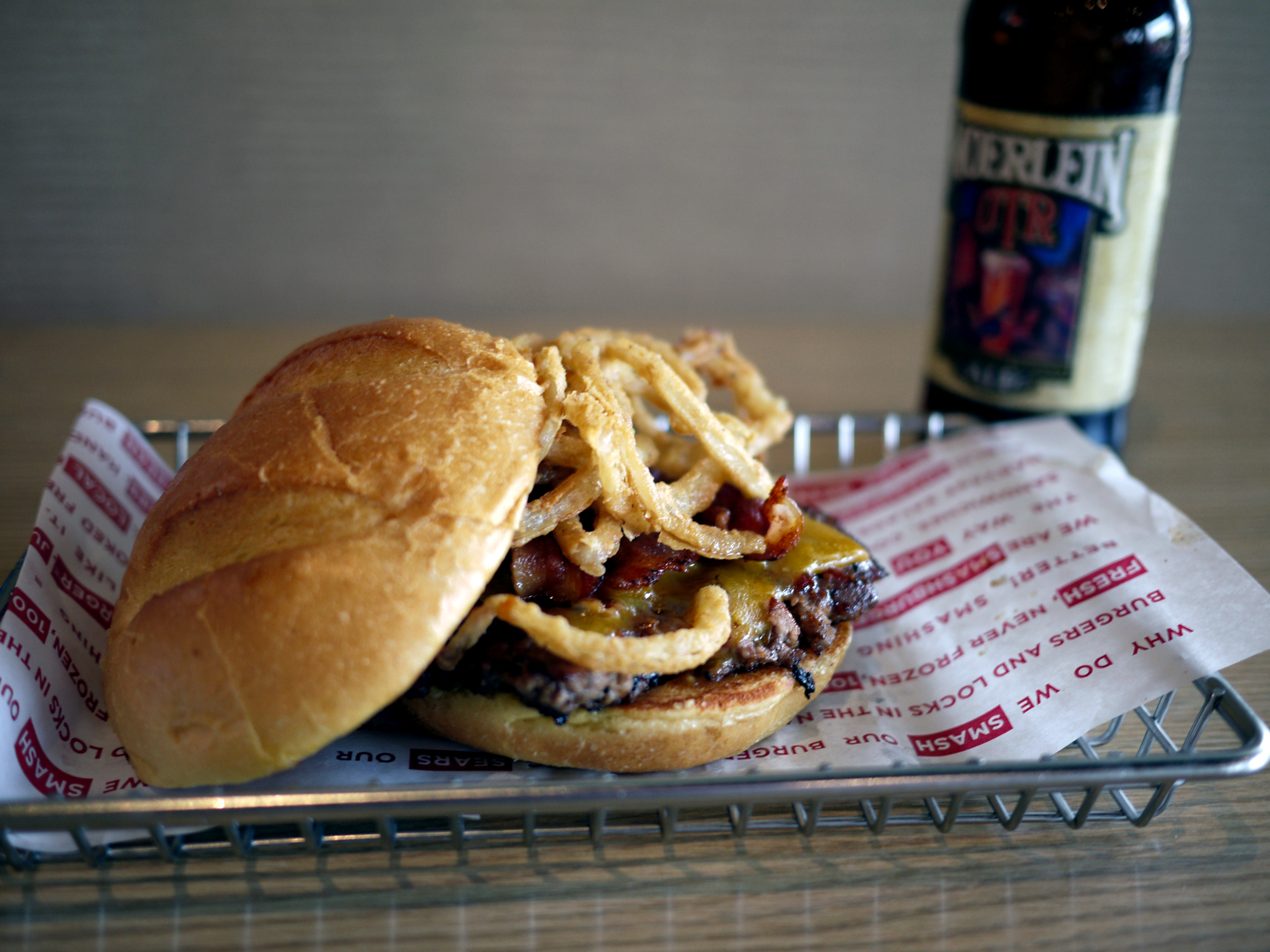
A smash burger served at the US restaurant chain SmashBurger

The cooking style was long associated with diners and chains such as Steak 'n Shake. It gained renewed attention in the 2000s and 2010s through U.S. fast-casual chains including Shake Shack and SmashBurger. By the early 2020s, independent restaurants and food critics noted a significant rise in global popularity. In Central Europe, the Hungarian-founded Simon's Burger was among the early adopters of the format, opening its first restaurant in Budapest in 2022.

In the United Kingdom, some restaurants had specialized in the format before 2020, but the trend expanded rapidly after 2022. National supermarket chains such as Waitrose and Aldi Süd also introduced smash burger products.

By the 2020s, the smash burger was frequently described as the "it" burger of the decade. Analysts and restaurateurs cite its appeal as fast, cost-effective to produce, and well-suited for casual dining menus, in contrast with the thick, gourmet-style "bistro burger" popular in the 2000s and 2010s.

== Variations ==
The fried onion burger, also called an "Oklahoma onion burger" or an "Okie burger," is a regional style in which a wad of thinly sliced onions is smashed into the patty as it cooks, producing caramelized onion shards within the burger.

Other variations include the mustard-fried smash patty, credited to In-N-Out Burger, in which mustard is spread on one side of the beef before grilling, and regional adaptations such as Wisconsin butter burgers and Memphis deep-fried patties at Dyer's Burgers.

Meat-free versions also exist, such as Beyond Meat's "ready to smash" plant-based patty and Symplicity's mushroom-based alternative. Chicken-based smash burgers have also gained popularity.

== See also ==
- History of the hamburger
- List of hamburgers
