= Bobcat Bite =

Restaurant in Santa Fe, New Mexico

Coordinates: 35°34′57″N 105°53′50″W

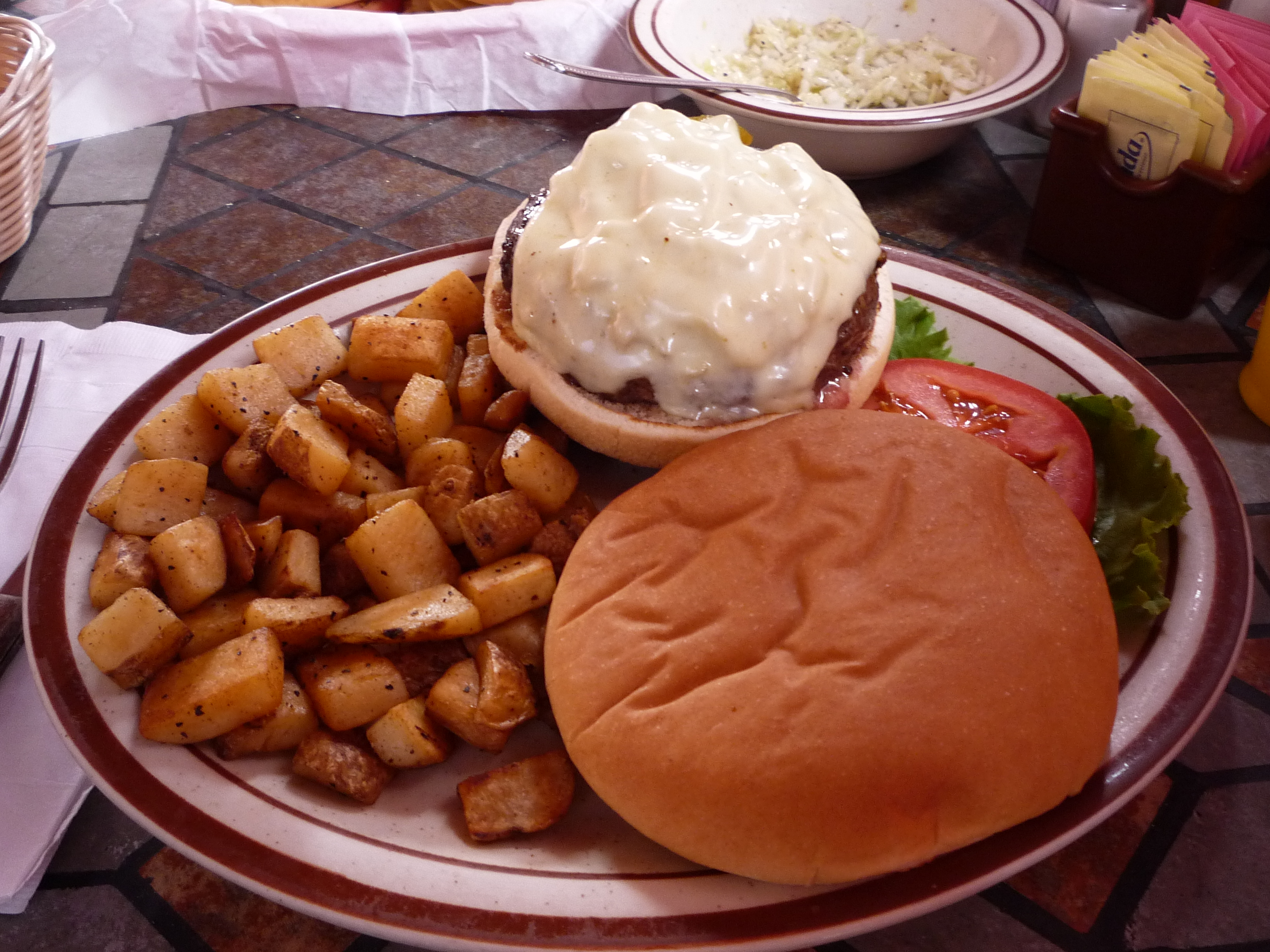
- Bobcat Bite Burger
- Interactive map of Bobcat Bite

Restaurant information
- Established: 1953; 73 years ago
- Food type: Southwestern
- Location: 418 Old Las Vegas Highway, Santa Fe, Santa Fe County, New Mexico, 87505, United States
- Seating capacity: 55
- Reservations: First-come, first-served
- Website: jambobobcatbite.com

Bobcat Bite is a restaurant that is located in Santa Fe, New Mexico, off of the Old Las Vegas Highway. The location itself has hosted two businesses, both of which have gone by the name "Bobcat Bite". The original Bobcat Bite specialized in the preparation of steak, chops, and hamburgers.

== Origins ==
The historic building that housed Bobcat Bite was originally a trading post. It later became a gun shop, until Rene Clayton and her daughter, Mitzi Clayton/Panzer, converted it into a restaurant. In 1956, Rene's sister Millie Cowell and her husband Don Cowell moved from Iowa Falls to operate the Bobcat Bite. The Bobcat Bite has been variously featured in newspapers, television, and other such media, and has been referred to by said media as "...the place to go for a green chile cheeseburger."

The name of the establishment is in reference to alleged accounts that tell of bobcats descending from the surrounding hills to visit "bobcat-friendly" diners that reportedly served the animals fresh scraps of food.

== Reception ==
During its time under the Eckre family's management, Bobcat Bite has been named in several articles, including those contained within the Albuquerque Journal, the Chicago Tribune, and The New York Times. Bobcat Bite also appeared in the 2004 documentary Hamburger America. The restaurant in 2007 was mentioned in the Food Network's program Top American Restaurants: Bon Appétit Picks the Best, hosted by Alton Brown. Bobcat Bite was featured in the 2012 episode "New Mexico" on Bizarre Foods America. Host Andrew Zimmern ranks it in his top 3 hamburgers.

=== Awards ===
Bobcat Bite's burgers, specifically the green chile cheeseburger, have won awards including:

- GQ magazine listed Bobcat Bite at #12 on its list of "The 20 Hamburgers You Must Eat Before You Die".
- The Santa Fe Reporter awarded Bobcat Bite with "Best Burger" in 2002, 2003, and 2004.

== Status ==
The original Bobcat Bite closed June 9, 2013. Former owners Bonnie & John Eckre opened a new restaurant known as Santa Fe Bite in August 2013. It closed in October 2018, but re-opened in a new location in Santa Fe in late 2019, in combination with an additional location in Albuquerque. The original site later reopened as Jambo Bobcat Bite under Kenyan chef Ahmed Obo, with a menu fusing African and Caribbean cuisine with American and New Mexican.

== See also ==
- List of hamburger restaurants
