= Schweid & Sons =

American meat supplier

Schweid & Sons is a family-owned ground beef supplier, which began in the late 1800s as a butcher shop in New York City.

As of 2025, Schweid & Sons products are sold in approximately 18,000 retail locations across the country.

== History ==
When Schweid & Sons started, it was owned by Harry Schweid; in the 1950s, his son, Sam Schweid, continued the tradition by starting another butcher shop.

Sam's son, David, was the one to coin the name "Schweid & Sons", as well as shift the primary focus to ground beef.

In 2023, the company introduced Brazen Climate Friendly Ground Beef Burgers.

The CEO as of 2017 is Jamie Schweid, one of David Schweid’s two sons; the other son being Brad Schweid.
