= Butter burger =

Hamburger topped with butter

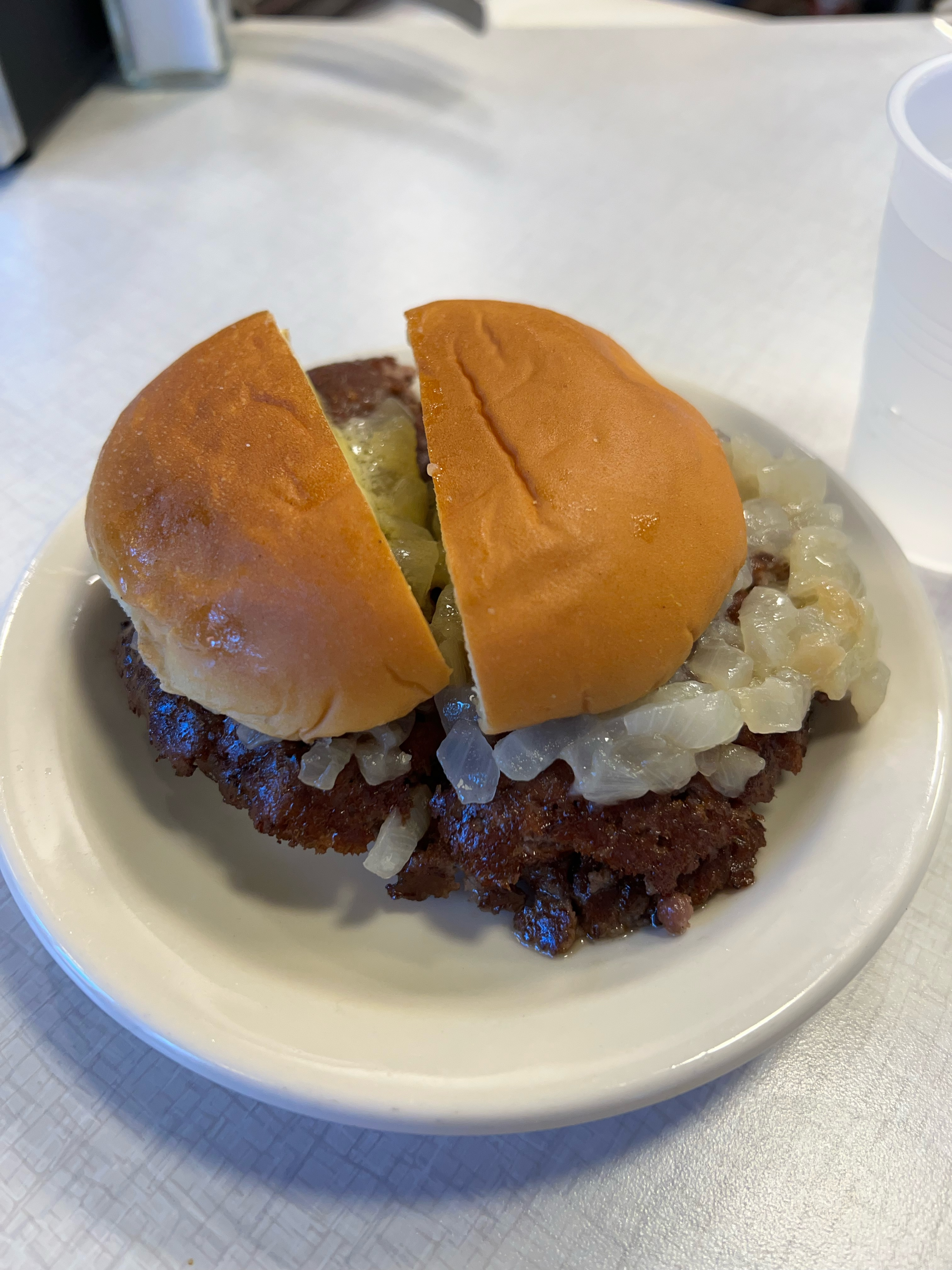
- Butter burger with onions, from Hamburger America
- Place of origin: United States
- Region or state: Wisconsin
- Main ingredients: Hamburger, butter

A butter burger is a hamburger topped with butter, either directly on the patty, or on the bun. Believed by many to have been invented in Wisconsin, they remain popular in some northern parts of the midwestern United States, and are the principal item of Wisconsin-based fast food restaurant Culver's. Many restaurants in and around Wisconsin serve butter burgers.

== History ==
Charlie Nagreen served hamburgers fried in butter at the Seymour fair in 1885, the precursor to the butter burger. The butter burger was popularized by the restaurants Solly's Grille and Krolls' beginning in 1936. Hamburger historian George Motz posited in 2018 that Solly's was one of the last "real" butter burgers left, in that they use butter as a condiment and add up to three tablespoons of it on top of each hamburger.

Culver's, founded in 1984, butters the top bun, as opposed to the patty itself. Steak 'n Shake introduced their "Wisconsin Buttery Steakburger" in 2009, using Wisconsin butter and American cheese. Jack in the Box introduced the "Classic Buttery Jack" in 2015, a butter burger with garlic herb butter melted onto the patty.

== See also ==
- List of hamburgers
