= Fried pickle =

Snack food made by deep-frying sliced battered dill pickles

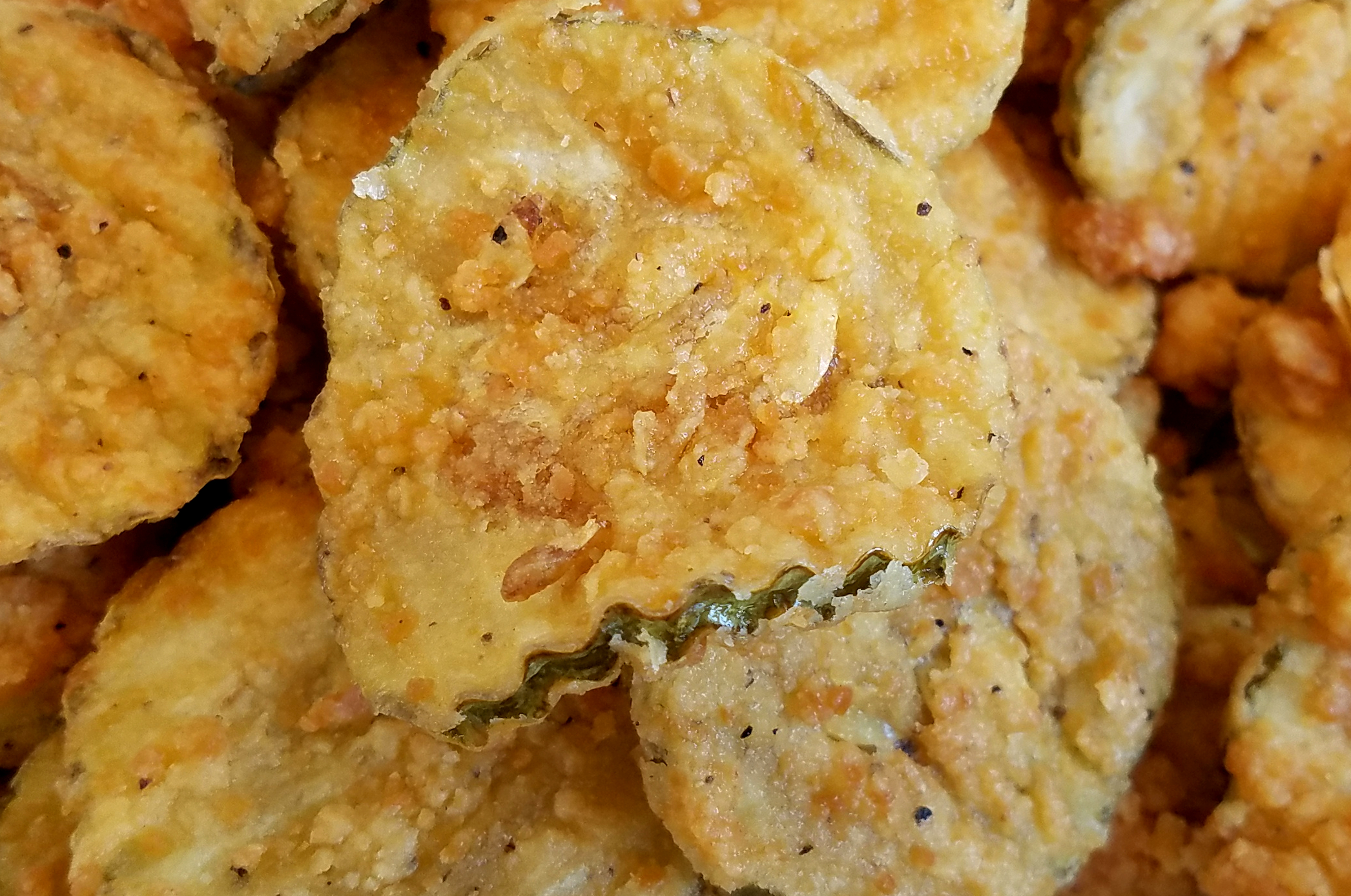
- Fried pickles
- Course: Snack/side dish
- Place of origin: United States
- Region or state: Southern US
- Main ingredients: Pickled cucumber Batter; Cooking oil

Fried pickles are a side dish and appetizer found commonly in the Southern U.S. They are made by deep-frying sliced battered dill pickles.

== History ==
Fried pickles first appeared on the American culinary scene in the early 1960s. The first known fried pickle recipe was printed in the Oakland Tribune on November 19, 1962, for "French Fried Pickles", which called for using sweet pickle slices and pancake mix.

Fried dill pickles were popularized by Bernell "Fatman" Austin in 1963 at the Duchess Drive In located in Atkins, Arkansas. The Fatman's recipe is only known to his family and used once each year at the annual Picklefest in Atkins, held each May.

Fried pickles are served at food festivals and menus of individual and chain restaurants throughout the United States and elsewhere. They can be eaten as an appetizer or as an accompaniment to other dishes. Fried pickles are frequently served with a ranch dressing or other creamy sauce for dipping. In 1963, before the culinary world knew of ranch dressing, the Fatman offered ketchup as a dipping sauce.

== See also ==
- List of deep fried foods
- List of pickled foods
