= Solly's Grille =

American restaurant

Coordinates: 43°6′1″N 87°55′2″W

- Interactive map of Solly's Grille

Restaurant information
- Established: 1936
- Owner: Fieber family
- Food type: Butter burgers, diner food
- Location: 4629 N. Port Washington Road, Glendale, Wisconsin, United States
- Website: sollysgrille.com

Solly's Grille is a Glendale, Wisconsin diner thought to be the creator of the butter burger.

== History ==
The Fieber family has owned the restaurant since 1936, and it is named after Glenn Fieber's stepfather Kenneth Salmon, known as Solly. When it opened, the restaurant was called Solly's Coffee Shop, but Glenn renamed it Solly's Grille in 1993 when he bought the restaurant from his mother.

Though open since 1936, it has been in its current location since 1971.

Their traditional butter burger is cooked atop a flattop grill and is steamed in butter and is then topped with butter as a condiment.

== Honors and awards ==
In 2022, they were named a James Beard America's Classic.
