= Steamed cheeseburger =

Type of hamburger

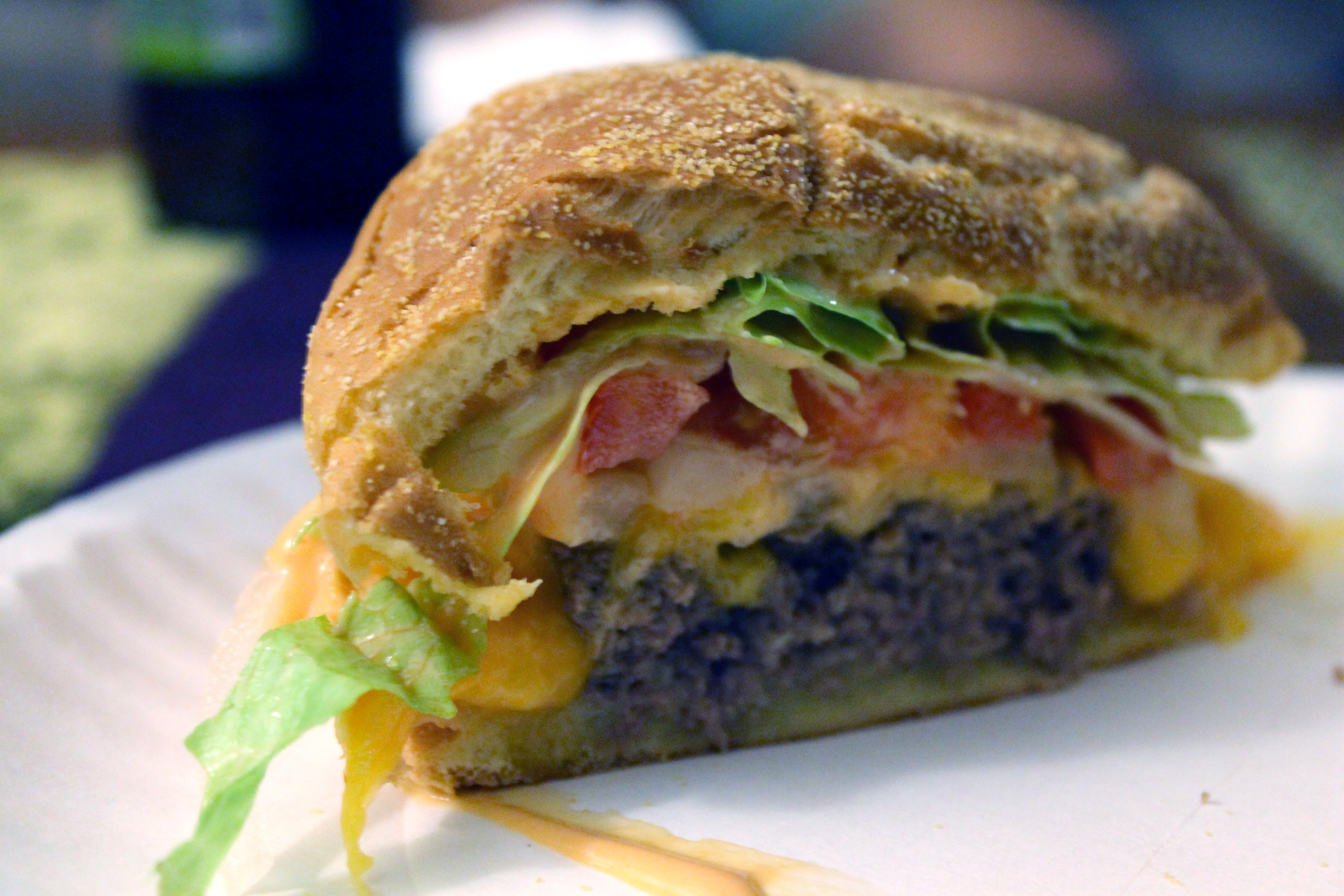
Half of a steamed cheeseburger

A steamed cheeseburger, also referred to as a steamer or cheeseburg, is a hamburger topped with cheese that is cooked via steaming and originally only served by restaurants in central Connecticut in the United States in the early 20th century. Despite it now being available elsewhere, it is still difficult to find outside that area.

== Preparation ==
What makes the steamed cheeseburger different from typical cheeseburgers is the way it is prepared. Instead of being fried in a pan or grilled on a grill, it is steamed in a stainless-steel cabinet containing rectangular trays are either packed with 5 ounces (140 g) of extra-lean ground beef patties or contain a 2-ounce (57 g) chunk of New York or Wisconsin cheddar cheese. This method of cooking makes the fats in the meat melt away; they are then drained from the tray once the patty is fully cooked. The end result is a moist, juicy burger which is then served by scooping the meat onto a hard roll, and then pouring the melted cheese over the meat. They are served with various toppings, although sweet onions and mustard are customary.

The steamer is a custom-built stainless-steel steaming box that steams the burgers and cheese in the same chamber.

== Invention ==
The steamed cheeseburger is believed to have been invented at a restaurant called Jack's Lunch in Middletown, Connecticut, in either the 1920s or 1930s. Jack's Lunch was located at 434 Main Street and operated by Jack Fitzgerald for 44 years. The steamed cheeseburgers at Jack's Lunch were "cooked in a tall copper box filled with simmering water for 18 tin trays of square ground-beef patties." Cheddar cheese was an option at an additional 5 cents. One theory as to what sparked the idea for the steamed cheeseburger is that, back in the 1920s, steaming was being touted as a healthy alternative to frying, in that steamed food was easier to digest than fried food.

The steamed cheeseburger was believe to have been introduced to Meriden, Connecticut by Fred Klett at the Broad Street Diner. At the time, restaurants used steamers made for canning or had steamers custom made out of sheet metal. A Meriden resident, Dale Greenbacker, founded Daleco Corp to manufacture a steamer specifically designed for hamburgers, the Burg'r Tend'r, which is still widely used by steamed cheeseburger restaurants.

== Availability and distribution in central Connecticut ==
Ted's Restaurant in Meriden is the most famous eatery that serves steamed cheeseburgers, but they are also available at establishments in the adjacent towns of Wallingford, Middletown, Portland, and Cromwell; further east in East Hampton; and further south in North Haven. Ted's also operates a food truck called the Steam Machine, which sells steamed cheeseburgers further north at UConn Huskies football games, at Pratt & Whitney Stadium at Rentschler Field in East Hartford, Bushnell Park in downtown Hartford, and the Xfinity Theatre amphitheatre in Hartford. Ted's also has a concession stand behind section 101 inside the PeoplesBank Arena arena in Hartford.

== Hartford Yard Goats promotion ==
During the 2018 Minor League Baseball season, the Hartford Yard Goats played one home game as the "Hartford Steamed Cheeseburgers". Special one-off uniforms resembling the food item were worn by the players and made-to-order steamed cheeseburgers from Ted's Restaurant were available for fans to purchase.

== See also ==
- List of hamburgers
- List of steamed foods
