= Fried onion burger =

Regional American burger style and specialty of Oklahoma cuisine

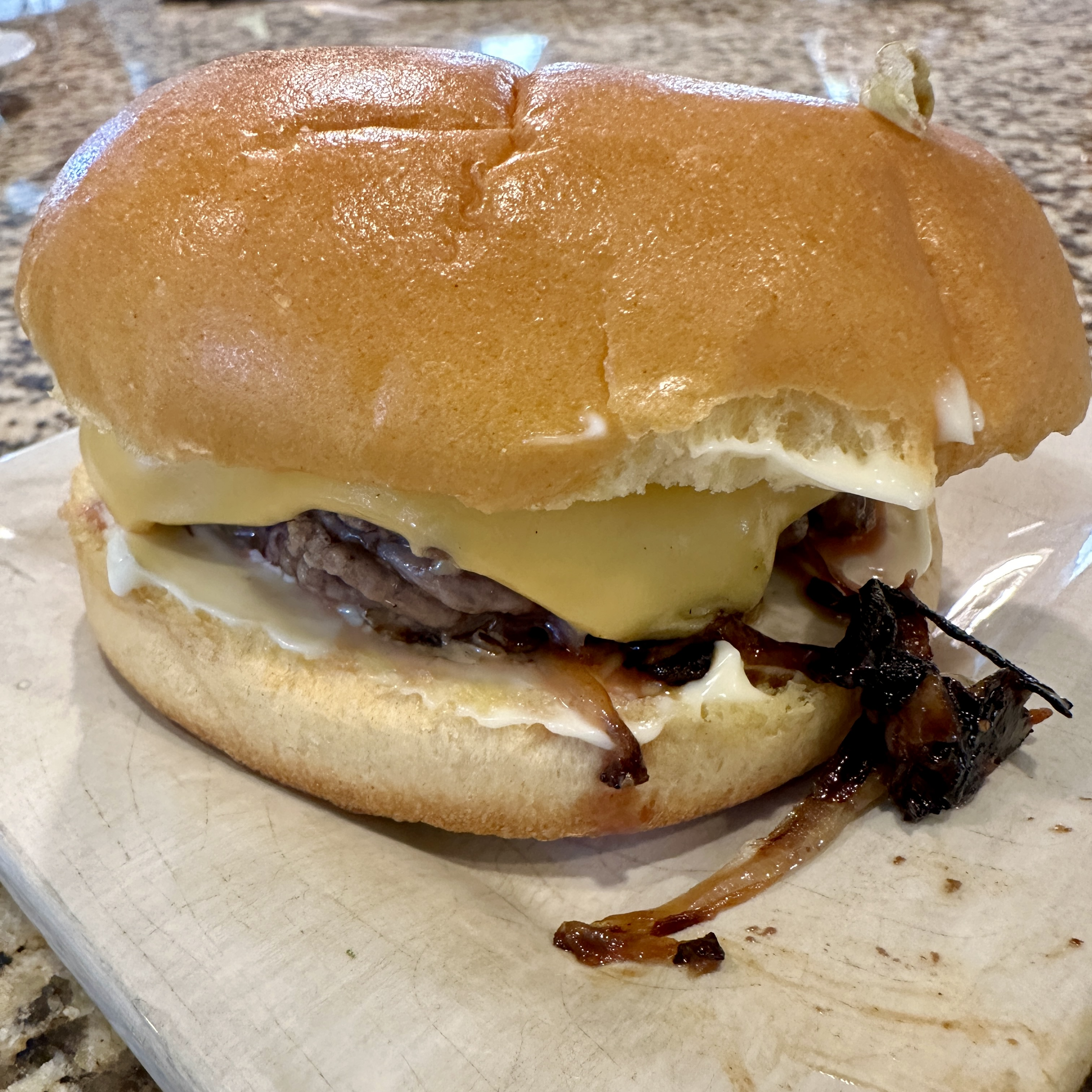
Fried onion burger

A fried onion burger, also called an Oklahoma onion burger, is a regional American burger style and specialty of Oklahoma cuisine. The dish was created in El Reno, Oklahoma, in the 1920s by a restaurateur searching for a way to stretch ground beef with a less expensive ingredient in order to cheaply feed striking railroad workers during the Great Railroad Strike of 1922. Its primary ingredients are thinly sliced onions and ground beef.

== Background ==
According to restaurateur and food historian George Motz, El Reno sits within the American Burger Belt, which reaches from Texas to Wisconsin and where traditional American burgers were created.

== Origin ==
The onion burger was created in El Reno by Homer and Ross Davis, a father and son, at their restaurant Hamburger Inn near the intersection of Route 66 and U.S. Route 81 as a way to stretch ground beef with less expensive onions to feed railroad workers during the Great Railroad Strike of 1922 and became further popularized during the Great Depression. The Davises named it the Depression Burger and sold it for five cents. The dish spread throughout western Oklahoma.

Other burgers with onions were created around the same time and for the same reasons. According to food historian John T. Edge, the inclusion of a large amount of onions "bespoke a frugal impulse that is more universal than local...the taste for burgers laced with onions was wrought during the days of privation". Extending ground beef with onions also predates the onion burger; the 1883 Boston Cooking School Cookbook included a recipe that called for mashing two or three onions into a pound of ground beef.

== Ingredients and preparation ==
Thinly sliced yellow onion is piled onto a small thick patty of ground beef, set onto the hot grill, and pressed hard to form a large thin patty with the onions embedded into the meat. The burger is approximately half onion.

The burger is seared for a short time on the first side, and when flipped, the onions cook and caramelize. Buns are untoasted and are steamed on top of the grilling burger before assembling the sandwich. Garnishes include pickles, served on the side, and usually yellow mustard. American cheese is another common addition, although it is rarely opted for among the older generations in Oklahoma.

== Popularity ==
As late as 2016 the burger was not well known outside of El Reno. The burger became better known outside of the area in the 2010s and 2020s; according to J. Kenji Lopez-Alt, the burger became known outside the area due to the work of Motz.

The city of El Reno holds a Fried Onion Burger Day festival annually on the first Saturday in May.

Nic’s Grill in Oklahoma City and its onion burger were featured on Diners, Drive-Ins and Dives on August 7, 2009.

== See also ==
- Smash burger
- List of hamburgers
