= George Motz =

American presenter, historian and author

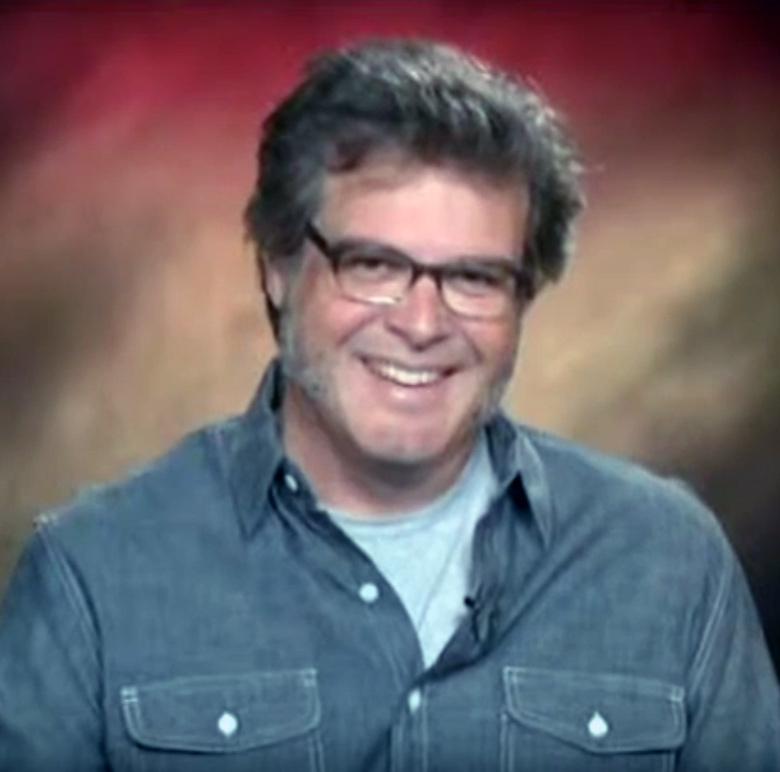
- Motz in 2013
- Education: Catholic University of America
- Occupations: Television personality, author, filmmaker, restaurateur
- Known for: Directing Hamburger America and founding the restaurant of the same name

George Motz is an American television personality, author and filmmaker. Motz directed the 2004 documentary film Hamburger America and has written books detailing the history of the hamburger in the United States. He hosted the Travel Channel show Burger Land from 2012 to 2013. He is a contributor for First We Feast with a series titled Burger Scholar Sessions. He is also the owner and head chef of Hamburger America in SoHo, Manhattan.

== Career ==
Motz worked as a Director of Photography for WNET in New York. For his work he was a recipient of three Emmy Awards (one in 2000 and two in 2006).

Motz taught a single session New York University course about hamburgers in the fall of 2005.

In 2007, Motz founded The Food Film Festival based in New York City. The festival is held annually in New York City, Chicago, and Charleston.

In November 2023, Motz opened Hamburger America, a luncheonette-style hamburger restaurant in New York's SoHo neighborhood.

== Filmography ==
=== Hamburger America ===
In 2004, Motz directed a documentary film titled Hamburger America about the American hamburger and eight "iconic burger joints". A book of the same name was later released.

=== Burger Land (2012–2013) ===
Between 2012 and 2013, Motz was the host of Burger Land on the Travel Channel.

=== Burger Scholar Sessions ===
Motz has been a regular contributor for First We Feast since 2018, for The Burger Show, where he would frequently guest star, and also his own hosted series, Burger Scholar Sessions, where Motz would introduce audiences to different distinct regional hamburgers, such as the Oklahoma fried onion burger, and also show how the burgers are prepared.

== Personal life ==
Motz grew up on Long Island, New York; most notably in Garden City and Quogue. Motz lives in New York. He has two children.

== Published works ==
- Hamburger America: One Man's Cross-Country Odyssey to Find the Best Burgers in the Nation (2008)
- Great American Burger Book: How to Make Authentic Regional Hamburgers at Home (2016)
