= History of the hamburger =

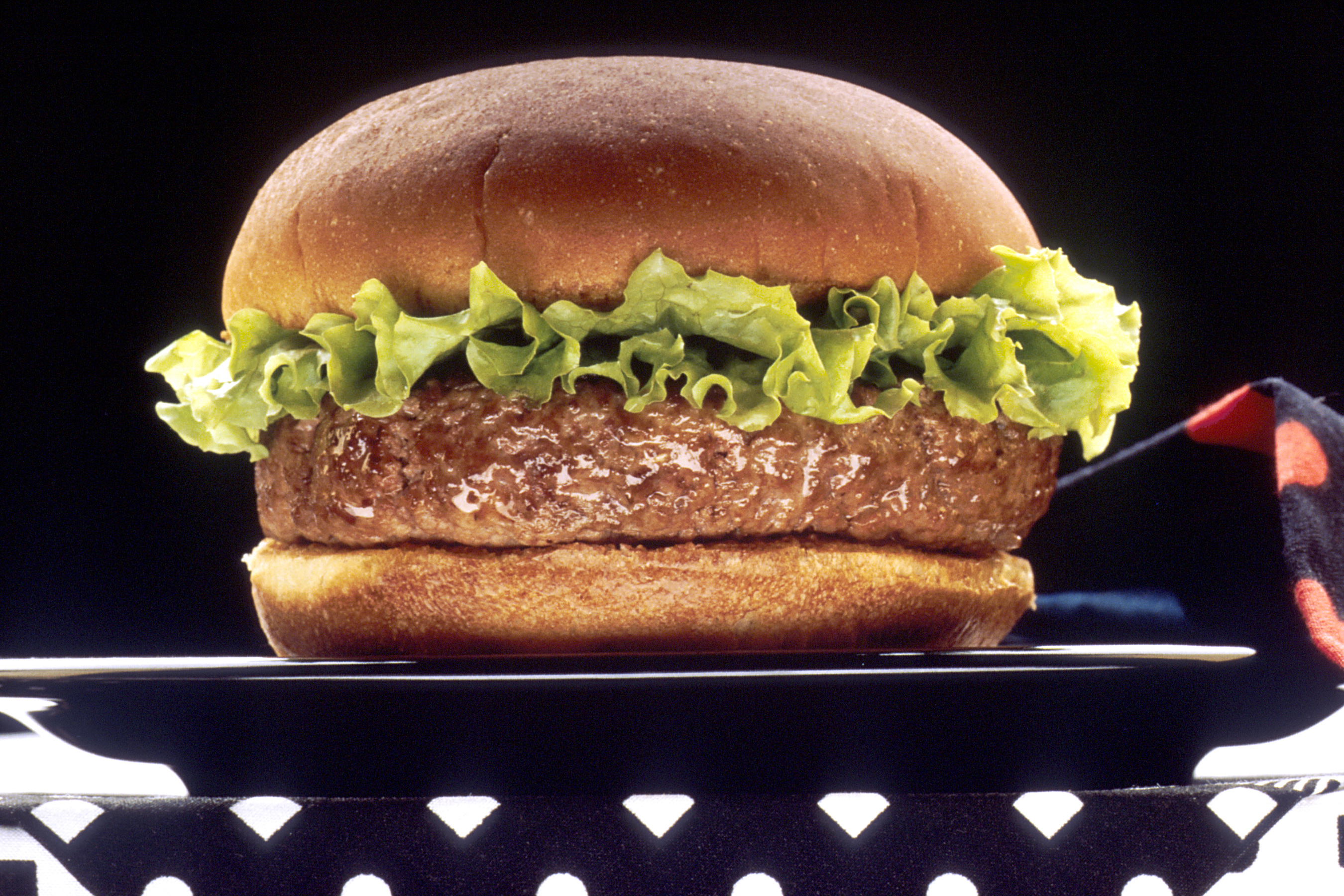
Hamburger profile showing the typical ingredients: bread, vegetables, and ground meat.

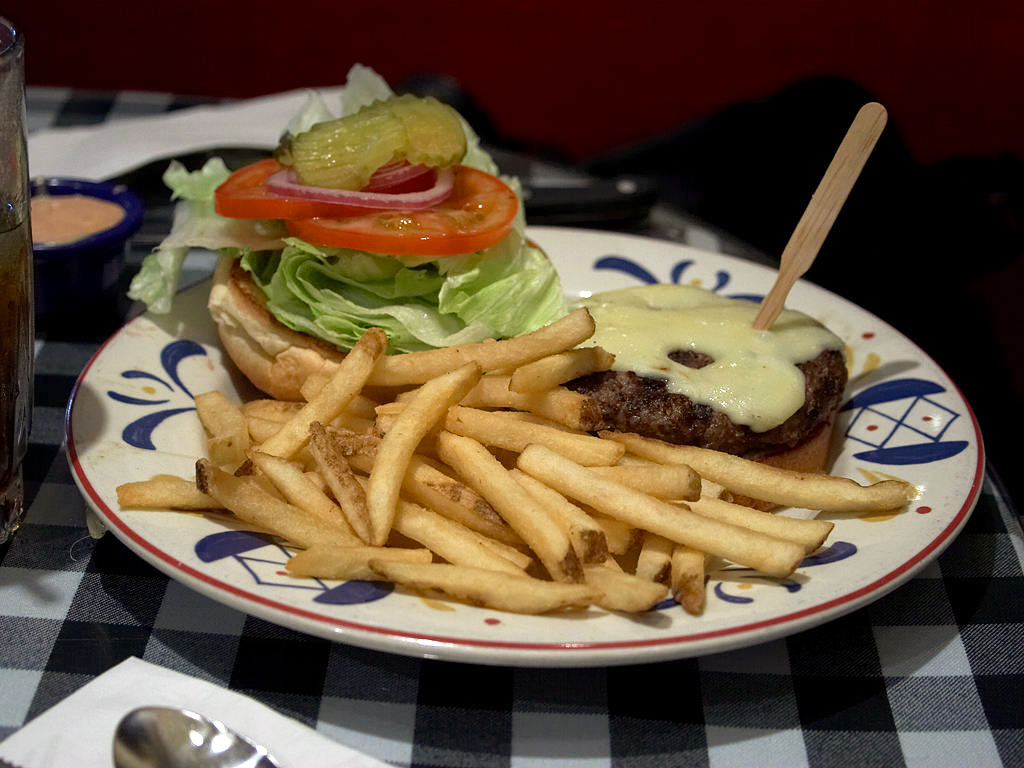
Open hamburger with cheese and fries served in an American diner

Originally just a ground beef patty, as it is still interpreted in multiple languages, (Note: Eg. Italian: hamburger.) and the name "hamburger" may be a reference to ground beef sold in Hamburg; evidence also suggests that the United States was the first country to create the "hamburger" as it is known today, where two slices of bread and a ground beef patty were combined into a "hamburger sandwich" and sold as such. The hamburger soon included all of its current characteristic trimmings, including onions, lettuce, and sliced pickles.

There is still some controversy over the origin of the hamburger – mainly because its two basic ingredients, bread and beef, have been prepared and consumed separately for many years in many countries prior to their combination. However, after various controversies in the 20th century, including a nutritional controversy in the late 1990s, the burger is now readily identified with the United States, as well as a particular style of American cuisine, namely fast food. Along with fried chicken and apple pie, the hamburger has become a culinary icon in the United States.

The hamburger's international popularity is the result of the larger globalization of food that also includes the rise in global popularity of other national dishes, including the Italian pizza, Chinese fried rice, and Japanese sushi. The hamburger has spread from continent to continent, perhaps because it matches familiar elements in different culinary cultures. This global culinary culture has been produced, in part, by the concept of selling processed food, first launched in the 1920s by the White Castle restaurant chain and its founder Edgar Waldo "Billy" Ingram and then refined by McDonald's in the 1940s. This global expansion provides economic points of comparison like the Big Mac Index, by which one can compare the purchasing power of different countries where the Big Mac hamburger is sold.

== Origins ==
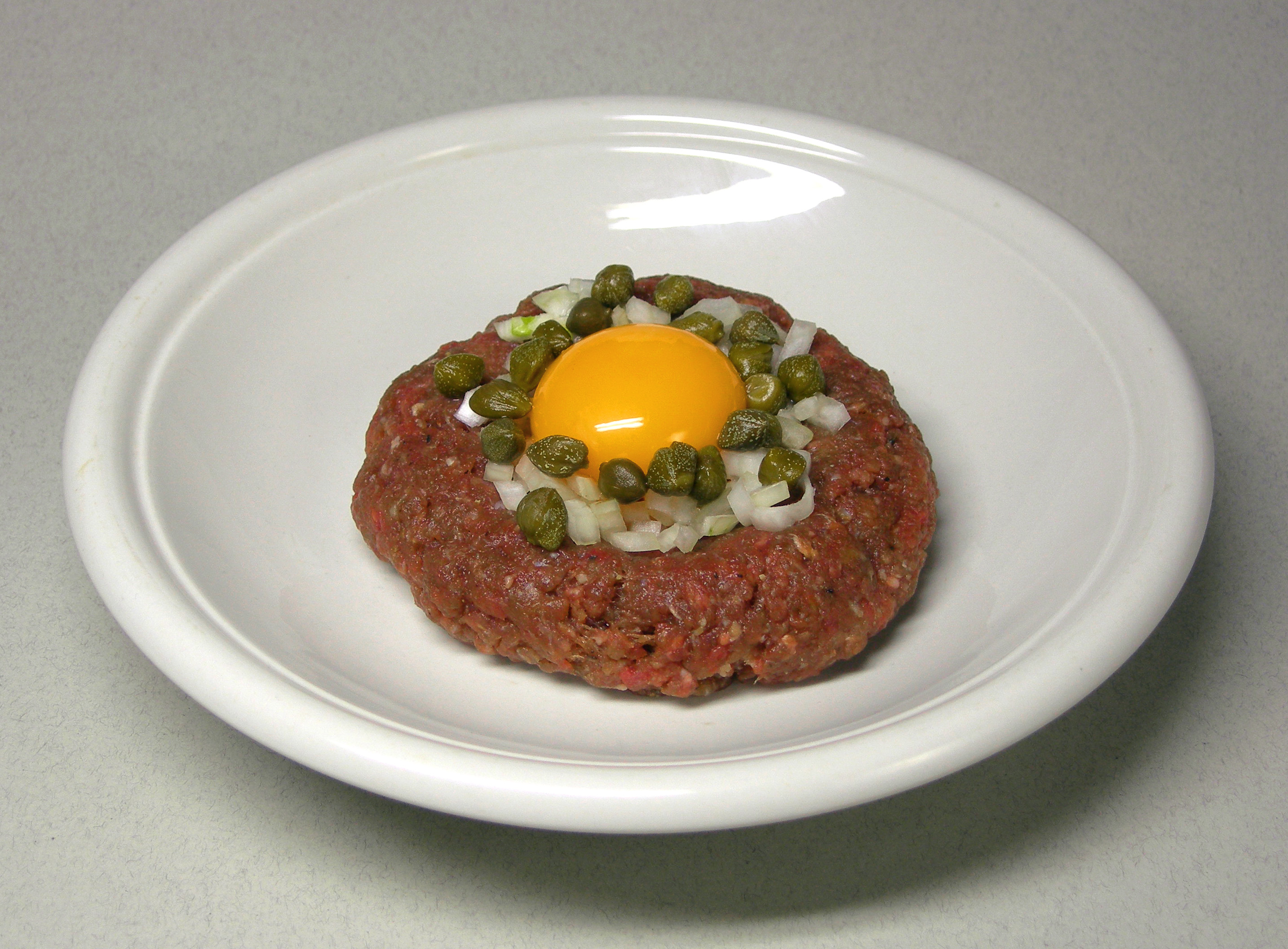
A french steak tartare

Apicius describes a ground meat dish, isicia omentata, which consists of chopped meat wrapped in caul fat and sauteed in a reduction of grape juice.

Another precursor to the hamburger is steak tartare, a seasoned ground beef patty served raw. It is not known when the first restaurant recipe for steak tartare appeared. While not providing a clear name, the first description of steak tartare was given by Jules Verne in 1875 in his novel Michael Strogoff. There are certain similarities between steak tartare and the German dishes Labskaus and Mett.

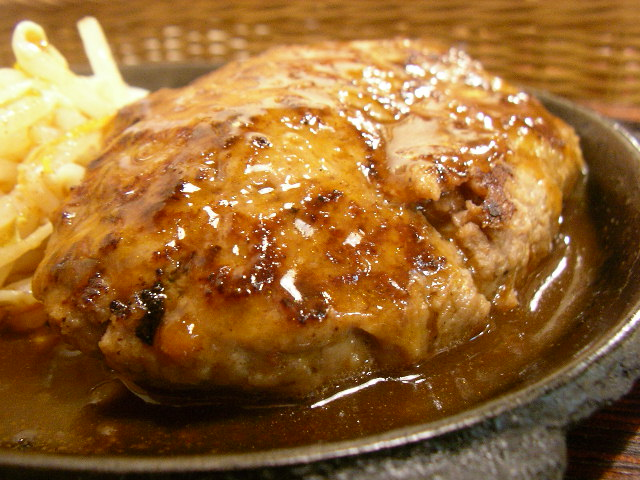
Hamburg steak has been known by the name "Frikadelle" in Germany since (at least) the 17th century.

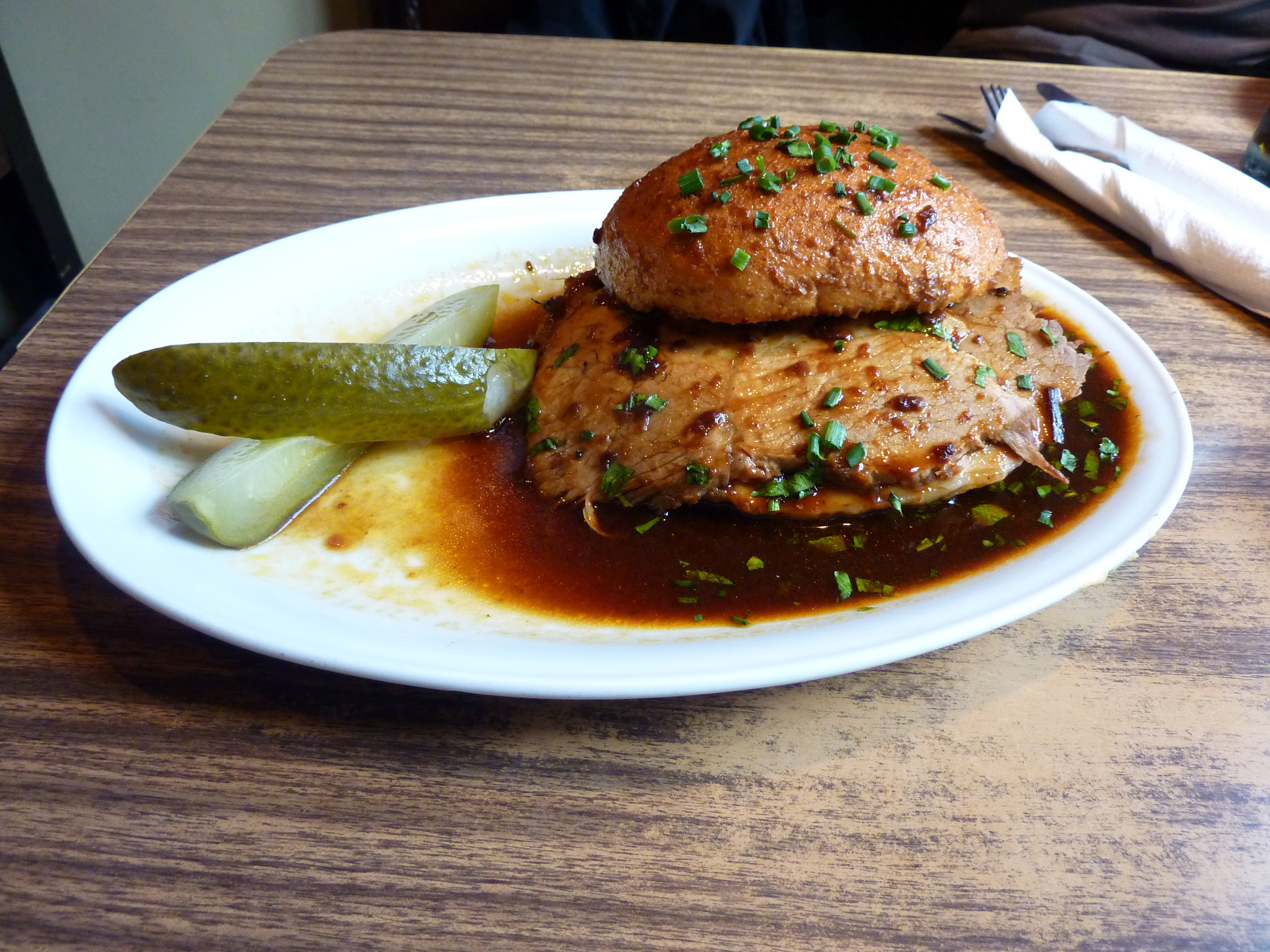
The ”Hamburger Rundstück” was popular already in 1869, and is believed to be a precursor to the modern hamburger.

Other similar raw, chopped meats appeared in the 20th century. One of the earliest known references to a "Hamburgh [sic] Sausage" dates to 1763 in Hannah Glasse's Art of Cookery, Made Plain and Easy. Hamburgh Sausage is made with minced meat and a variety of spices, including nutmeg, cloves, black pepper, garlic, and salt, and is typically served with toast. Other dishes are also made with minced meat, such as meatloaf, the Serbian pljeskavica, the Arab kofta, and meatballs.

The word sandwich was not recorded until the 18th century. Many cultures claim invention of the sandwich, but it was given its name around the year 1765 in honour of the English aristocrat John Montagu, 4th Earl of Sandwich, who preferred to eat sandwiches for the convenience so he could continue to play cards. In 1840, Elizabeth Leslie Cook included a sandwich recipe in her cookbook and it appeared in the local cuisine of the United States.

=== Hamburg and its port ===
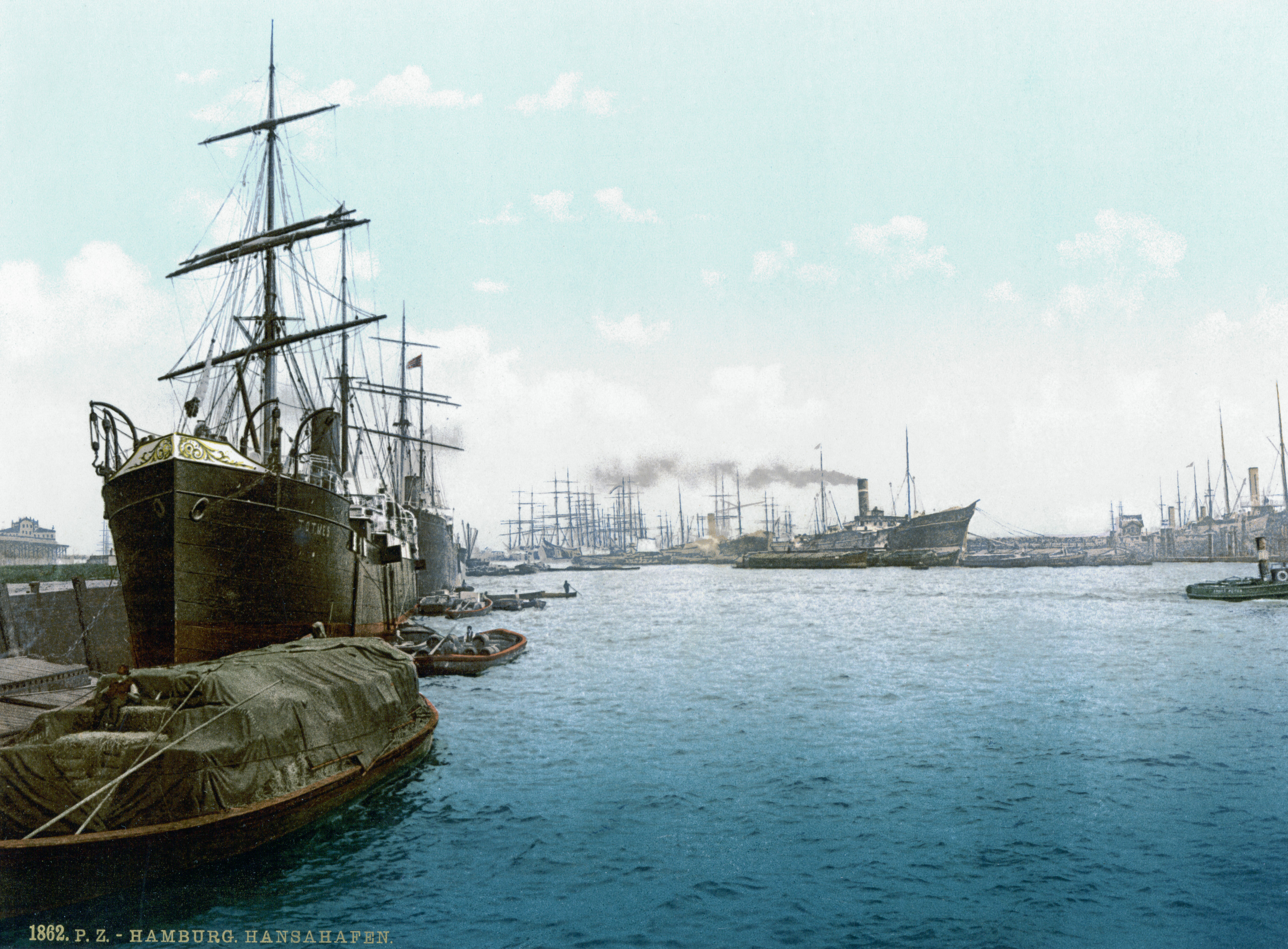
The port of Hamburg in the 1860s

Minced meat was a delicacy in medieval cuisine, red meat usually being restricted to the higher classes. Very little mincing was done by medieval butchers or recorded in the cookbooks of the time, perhaps because it was not part of the sausage-making process that preserves meat.

During the first half of the 19th century, most European emigrants to the New World embarked from Liverpool, England and rivalled later in the 19th century by Bremerhaven and Hamburg, Germany, and New York City was their most common destination. Restaurants in New York offered Hamburg-style American fillet, or even beefsteak à la Hambourgeoise. Early American preparations of minced beef were therefore made to fit the tastes of European immigrants, evoking memories of the port of Hamburg and the world they left behind.

=== Hamburg steak ===
In the late 19th century, the Hamburg steak became popular on the menus of many restaurants in the port of New York. This might consist of a fried patty of chopped beef, eggs, onions, and seasoning, such as salt, or it might be lightly salted and often smoked, and served raw in a dish along with onions and bread crumbs. The oldest document that refers to the Hamburg steak is a Delmonico's Restaurant menu from 1873 which offered customers an 11-cent plate of Hamburg steak prepared according to a recipe developed by American chef Charles Ranhofer (1836–1899). This price was high for the time, twice the price of a simple fillet of beef steak. However, by the end of the century the Hamburg steak was gaining popularity because of its ease of preparation, which in turn decreased its cost. This is evident from its detailed description in some of the most popular cookbooks of the day. Documents show that this preparation style was used by 1887 in some U.S. restaurants and was also used for feeding patients in hospitals; the Hamburg steak was served raw or lightly cooked and was accompanied by a raw egg.

The menus of many American restaurants during the 19th century included a Hamburg beefsteak that was often sold as a breakfast item. A variant of Hamburg steak is the Salisbury steak, which is usually served with a gravy similar in texture to brown sauce. Invented by Dr. James Salisbury (1823–1905), the term Salisbury steak has been used in the United States since 1897. Nowadays, in the city of Hamburg as well as in other parts of northern Germany, this type of dish is called Frikadelle, Frikandelle, or Bulette, which is similar to the meatball. The term hamburger steak was replaced by hamburger by 1930, which has in turn been somewhat displaced by the simpler term burger. The latter term is now commonly used as a suffix to create new words for different variants of the hamburger, including cheeseburger, porkburger, baconburger and mooseburger. There are other foods with names derived from German cities that are shortened in different ways in American English. An example is the frankfurter, often abbreviated as frank.

== Invention ==
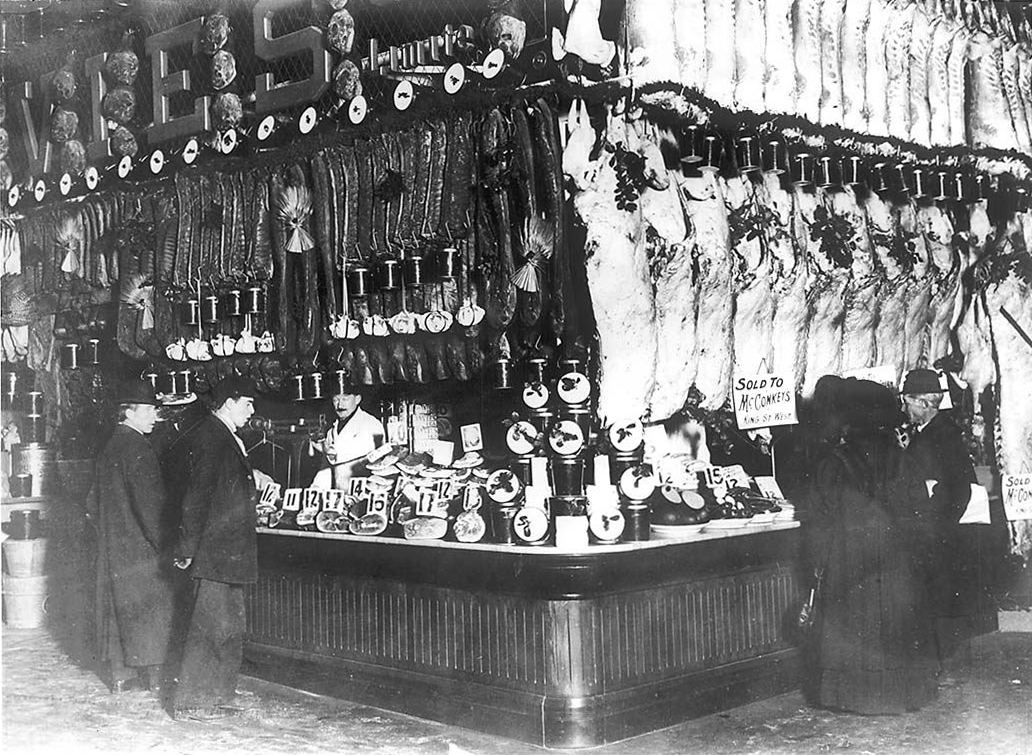
William Davies Company stall at the St. Lawrence Market in Toronto, Canada. Scenes such as this became common during the early twentieth century in the United States and Canada as the meat market grew rapidly.

Many recipes and dishes traveled along with transatlantic immigrants to their destinations in the New World. Some authors question whether the Hamburg America Line was part of this, arguing that the hamburger was created to meet needs that arose amongst immigrants already in the New World. Others, however, support the thesis that the Hamburg America Line brought the first hamburger steaks from Europe to the Americas. The hamburger as it is known today has multiple invention claims dating to between 1885 and 1904, but it is well established by the early 20th century. During the following 100 years, the hamburger spread throughout the world as a result of the emerging concept of fast food and a new business model: the franchise.

=== North America ===
The industrial use of mechanical meat shredding was the technical advance that helped popularize the Hamburg steak. The first meat grinder was invented in the early 19th century by the German engineer Karl Drais. The machine made it possible for minced meat to be sold at market in large quantities at reasonable prices. By 1845, numerous patents existed for improved meat grinders in the United States. These machines could all shred meat to sizes that were previously unimaginable. Before this, minced meat was prepared by hand at home using specialized chisels and requiring intensive manual labor that severely limited the amount that could be produced. It is very likely that the invention of the meat grinder contributed directly to the popularization of Hamburg steak, while the steak gradually became distant from its German roots in the minds of many Americans. Minced meat also came to be used in other popular American foods, including hot dogs and meatloaf.

Another development facilitating the invention and popularization of the proto-hamburger was the increased production of beef through livestock intensification. By the late 19th century, an increasing amount of land was being devoted to cattle and a growing number of people being employed as cowboys, resulting in the United States becoming one of the world's largest producers and consumers of beef. The 1880s were declared "The Golden Age of Beef", during which the abundance of rural beef production made vital its transportation by rail from agricultural to urban areas. This gave rise to various methods of meat preservation for making possible the consumption of fresh meat in urban and industrialized areas, among the refrigerator cars and different methods of packaging meat (such as corned beef), which were promoted by industrialists like Gustavus Swift (1839–1903). Around this time, the city of Chicago, along with cities on the East Coast, became a focal point for the large-scale processing of beef. Beef was already inexpensive at that time, and it was available to the working class. This put the Hamburg steak within reach of the vast majority of the population, giving rise to what some authors jokingly call the "American beef dream". In this era, the number of steakhouses that specialized in serving steaks increased markedly; some restaurants even served steak along with seafood, in a dish known as Surf and turf.

The high production and consumption of beef cattle in the United States made the meat industry increasingly powerful by the end of the 19th century. Corruption problems soon arose in the meat industry, problems that endangered both quality and hygiene. At the beginning of the 20th century, Upton Sinclair published The Jungle, a novel about conspiracies and corruption in the American meat industry, intended as a veiled criticism of the industry itself. The book raised popular awareness about the safety of meat processing and helped lead to the creation of the Pure Food and Drug Act, which was sponsored by the Food and Drug Administration. The Jungle was a milestone in the subsequent history of the hamburger, as it led the American public to force restaurant chains to prove the safety of their cooked meat. In 1933, Arthur Kallett published a similar book, entitled 100,000,000 Guinea Pigs: Dangers in Everyday Foods, Drugs, and Cosmetics, which warned consumers specifically about the content preservatives in hamburgers.

=== Controversial origins ===
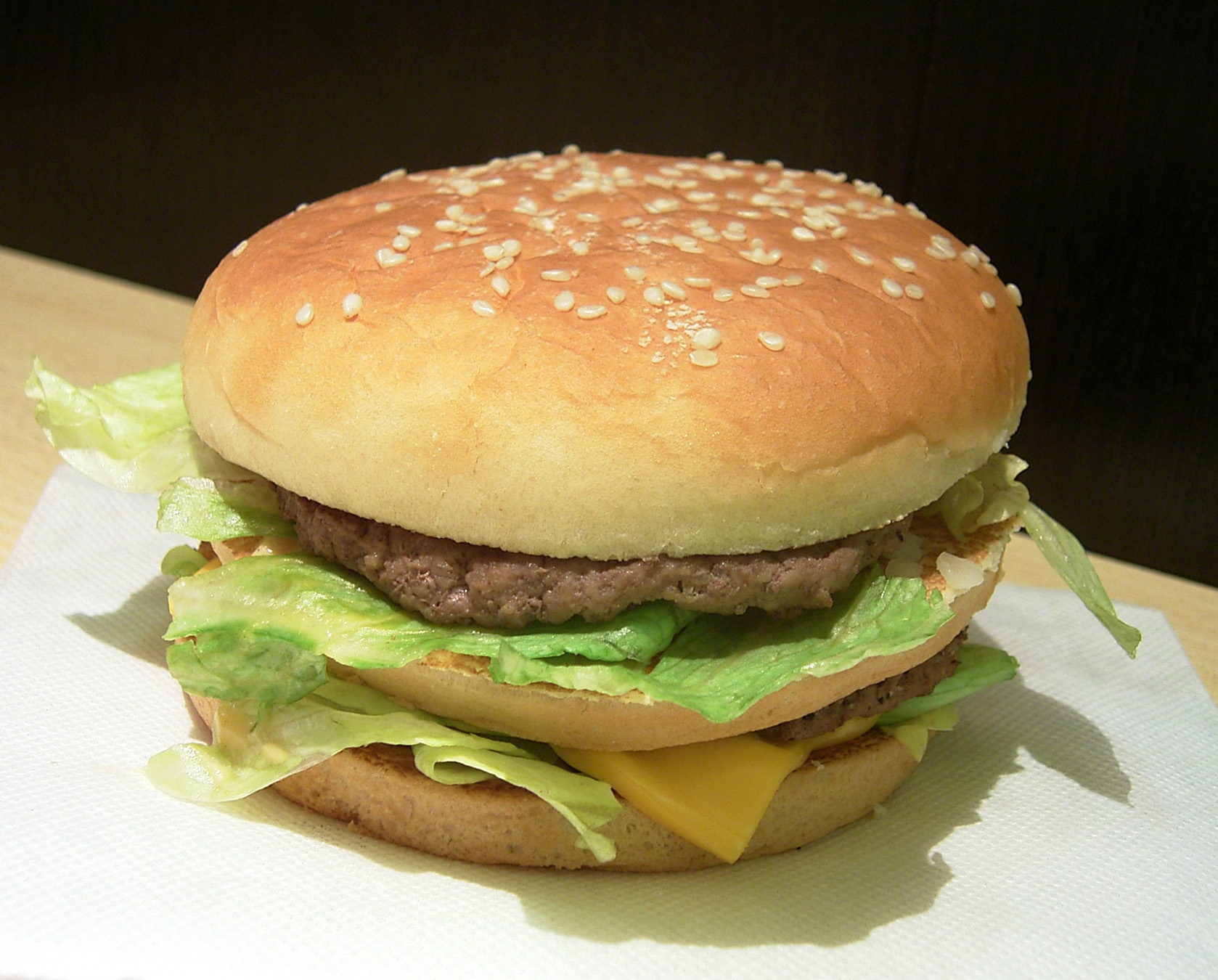
The Big Mac popularized an evolution in the image of the hamburger.

Many people have claimed to have invented the hamburger as a sandwich of a ground beef patty placed between two slices of bread. All claims for invention occur between 1885 and 1904, making it probable that the hamburger was created sometime in these two decades. Despite varieties, common elements in these narratives include the claim that the hamburger was born as a food associated with major events such as amusement parks, fairs, conferences, and festivals. These hypotheses also often share the presence of street vendors.

James A. Cockrell, editor of the St. Louis Globe-Democrat states that:

"In St. Louis I've heard from person, whose parents or grandparents came from the southern regions of Germany, say that northern Germans in the city of Hamburg were much given to eating ground meat, even in the distant past. Other Germans disapproved of the Hamburg ground meat freaks, especially the Hamburg types who liked raw ground meat. So the St. Louis Germans may have named the sandwich hamburger as a derisive gesture toward the barbaric, ground-meat gobblers in the city of Hamburg. It is certain that the people of Hamburg never got around to making a ground-meat sandwich. If they did it never caught on over there."

One of the first "birth of the burger" stories belongs to Canton, Ohio, natives Frank and Charles Menches who were food vendors at the 1885 Erie County Fair outside of Buffalo, New York, also known as the Hamburg Fair. According to this story, during the Fair the Menches ran out of their signature menu item of pork sausage sandwiches. Their local supplier, butcher Andrew Klein, was reluctant to butcher more hogs during a period of unseasonable late summer heat and suggested to substitute the use of ground beef. The brothers fired some up, but both found it dry and bland. They added coffee, brown sugar and other ingredients to create a unique taste. The original sandwiches were sold with just ketchup and sliced onions. With new found success with their beef sandwich, they named it the "hamburger" after the Erie County Fair's home town of Hamburg, New York. "National Birth of the Burger Day" is celebrated on September 18 to honor the invention of the burger in 1885 at the Hamburg Fair. In the 1920s, carnival historian John C. Kunzog interviewed Frank Menches about his experience at the Erie County Fair. His detailed hamburger story was published in this book, Tanbark & Tinsel published in 1970.

Another possible inventor of the hamburger is Charlie Nagreen (1871–1951) of Seymour, Wisconsin, who at the age of 15 sold Hamburg steaks from a street stall at the annual Outagamie County Fair. Nagreen said he began by selling Hamburg steaks, but these did not have much success because people wanted to freely move around the festival without the need to eat them at his stand. In response to this, in 1885 Nagreen decided to flatten the hamburger steak and insert it between two slices of bread, so that the public could move freely from booth to booth while eating his sandwich, an innovation that was well received by his customers. This became known as the "Hamburger Charlie", and Nagreen's creation was sold at the festival until his death in 1951. To this day, his accomplishment is celebrated annually with a "Burger Fest" in his honor in his hometown of Seymour.

Another alleged inventor of the hamburger is the cook Fletcher Davis (better known as "Old Dave"), who claimed to have had the idea of putting ground beef between two pieces of Texas toast when one of his customers was in too much of a hurry to sit down for a meal. The customer walked away with his Hamburger Steak and seemed so content that Old Dave offered his new carryout meal as a staple menu item at the end of 1880 in Athens, Texas. Fletcher had a stall with his wife at the St. Louis World's Fair of 1904. Texan journalist Frank X. Tolbert mentions a salesman named Fletcher Davis who served hamburgers in a café at 115 Tyler Street in Athens during the late 1880s. The locals claim that Davis was selling beef sandwiches during that time, without having a clear name for his invention. During the 1980s, the Dairy Queen ice cream chain filmed a documentary about the birthplace of the hamburger featuring Davis' story. The story of "Old Dave's Hamburger Sandwich" is also found mentioned in Ronald L. McDonald's book The Complete Hamburger.

There are many additional claims as to the origin of the hamburger. Some enthusiasts claim the hamburger could have been created in São Gonçalo, a municipality located in the Brazilian state of Rio de Janeiro, in the 18th century by a Chef named Sauerbrown "Little" Victor, but this claim has no supporting evidence to back the opinion. A local newspaper claims that Louis Lassen, a Danish immigrant who arrived in America in 1880, sold butter and eggs as a street vendor. In 1974, in an interview with The New York Times, he recounted how he created a hamburger steak sandwich with small strips of beef for a restaurant known as Louis' Lunch in New Haven, Connecticut. Lassen's family claims 1900 as the year of his invention. Revealed in a public confrontation between the grandson of Louis, Kenneth Davis Lassen Fletch, and his uncle, documentation signed under notary in 1900 demonstrates the development of the hamburger, as it stresses the difference between a "hamburger steak" and a "hamburger sandwich". Louis' Lunch flame broils the hamburgers in the original vertical cast iron gas stoves manufactured by the Bridge and Beach, Co., St. Louis, Missouri, in 1898. The stoves use hinged steel wire gridirons to hold the hamburgers in place while they cook simultaneously on both sides. The gridirons were made by Luigi Pieragostini and patented in 1938.

=== Ingredients ===
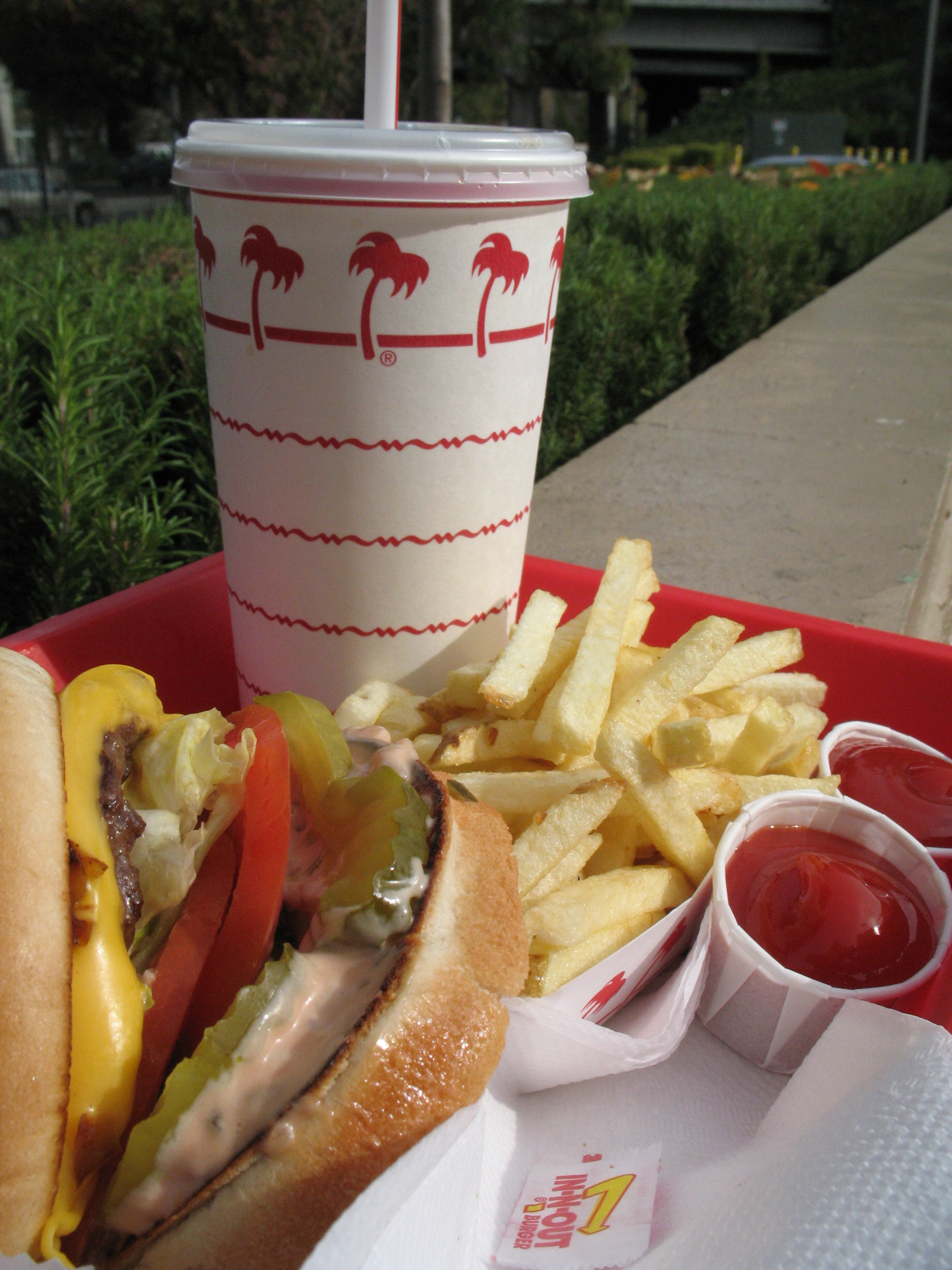
The modern hamburger with its familiar sides, French fries and a drink

Hamburg steak, once served between two slices of bread, began to be prepared with a variety of different ingredients that were included either in the sandwich itself or as a side dish accompanying it on a plate. One of these accompaniments, which is still common with today's burger, is ketchup, a type of tomato sauce with a blend of flavors between sweet and sour that was first produced commercially in 1869 by entrepreneur and chef Henry John Heinz in Sharpsburg, Pennsylvania. His company was originally called the Anchor Pickle and Vinegar Works, but in 1888 it was renamed F. & J. Heinz. The use of ketchup by American consumers grew quickly after this date, and it was not long before hamburgers were almost universally accompanied by ketchup by the end of the nineteenth and into the early 20th century. Mustard is a significantly older condiment, as it is thought that the ancient Romans used a dressing made with non-fermented grapes and grape seeds known as "mustum ardens". Another ingredient incorporated into the burger, mayonnaise, appears to have been present in 18th century France, after the naval victory of Louis-François-Armand du Plessis de Richelieu in the port of Mahón in Menorca around 1756.

Among the vegetables that come with the hamburger, the first described in the literature on its history is the onion, usually finely sliced in rings. Thus, the hamburger came to continue the long American tradition of sandwiches featuring some kind of plant product, whether that be lettuce (as in the case of the BLT sandwich), sauerkraut (as on the reuben), coleslaw, or pickles. It is possible that after the creation of the hamburger by uniting the steak with the bread, vegetables were included to give the finished product a more "natural" appearance and taste. All of these condiments were incorporated into the classical image of the hamburger during its golden age, the 1940s. In some cases, the hamburger is prepared differently and distinctly to add regional flavor, as in the case of Tex-Mex style burgers, which are served with a side of chili con carne.

French fries were invented in either France or Belgium. French fries were introduced as a snack in American cafés by the early 20th century, but they did not become popular until World War II-era rationing made them an inexpensive and easily available menu item. Initially, however, there were safety concerns raised over the fries and the kitchens in which they were prepared, leading some companies, such as White Castle, to remove them from their menus until the 1950s. The improvements in potato freezing technology made by J.R. Simplot of Idaho City and McDonald's in the 1960s aided the large scale production of French fries. Previously, the frozen potatoes lost some of their flavor during frying, but new processes avoided this inconvenience, partly thanks to the use of a mixture of cow tallow and soybean oil.

At the end of the 19th century, a new generation of cola emerged, a beverage that would soon join beer as the most traditional drinks served alongside the hamburger. The first recipe for Coca-Cola was invented in 1885 in Columbus, Georgia, by grocer John Pemberton. Originally called coca wine (the trademark was "Pemberton's French Wine Coca"), it may have been inspired by the formidable success of Vin Mariani, a European coca wine. In the late 19th century, it was sold as a bottled soft drink in most of the United States. In the early 20th century, another beverage, Pepsi, was created by pharmacist Caleb Bradham and quickly came to rival the sales of Coca-Cola. Strategic alliances between large burger restaurant chains and these two soft drink companies greatly increased the beverages' availability to the general public.

== Commercialization ==
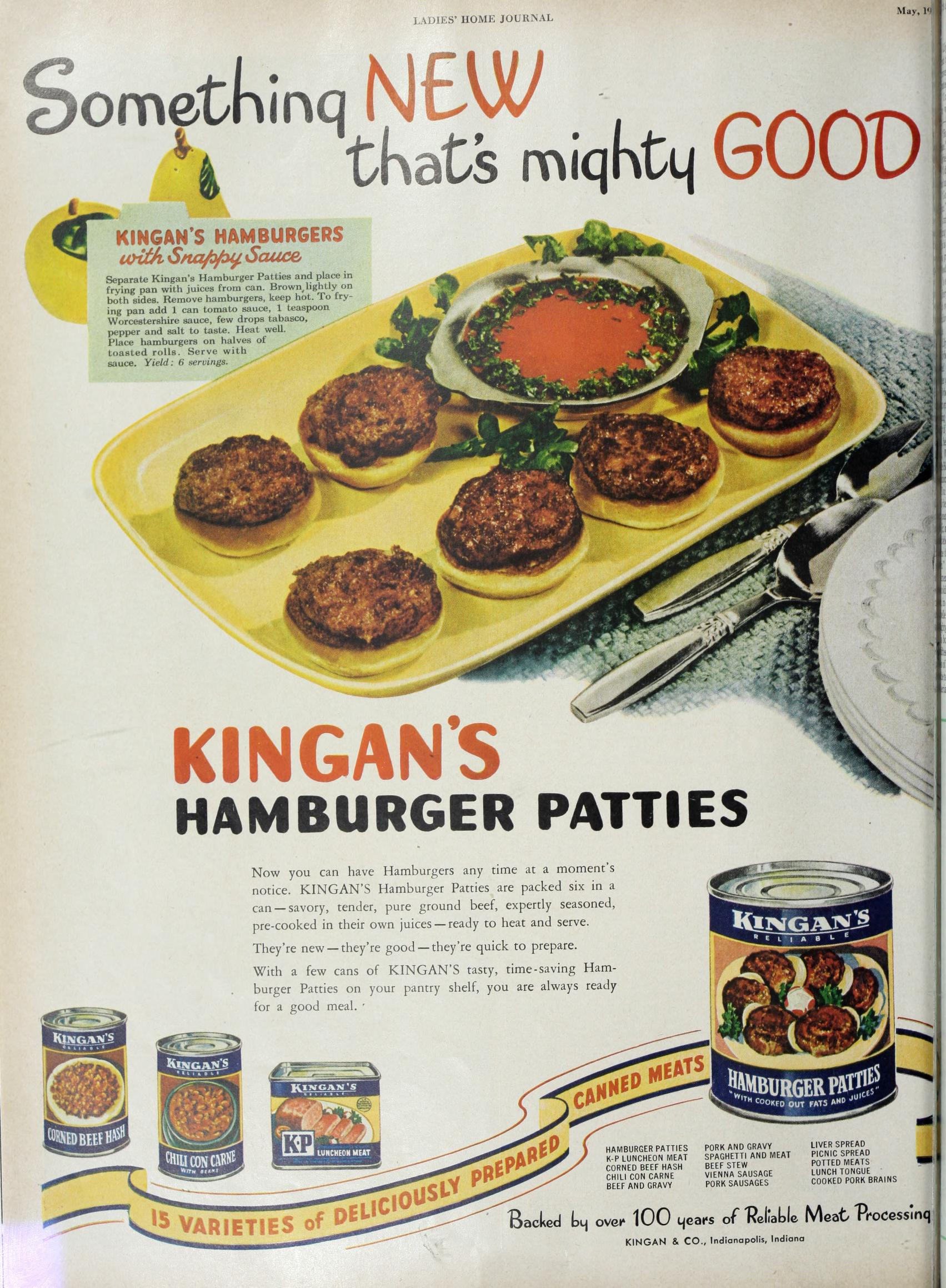
A 1948 advertisement for hamburger patties

The dawn of the 20th century witnessed the need to provide food for people living in highly productive urban centers with high population densities. Food also had to be economically affordable for the working class in order for them to maintain their labor and industrial production. The burger was born in a time when people needed to eat both "fast" and "cheap". Technological advances in the field of food preservation, as well as improvements in agricultural production and transportation, made it possible for hamburgers to be a practical choice of food for urban dwellers since their very creation. The socio-economic environment of the United States at the time of the burger's rise to popularity coincided with the end of World War I and the beginning of the Great Depression of 1929. This environment was particularly favorable for fostering inexpensive food, which was one reason why five-cent hamburgers were so popular. After its invention during the first decade of the 20th century, the hamburger came to be marketed on a large scale, after "visionaries" realized that it would benefit greatly from a mass production process.

The first automobile production line was created by Karl Benz in Germany in 1888. The widespread appearance of telephones occurred at the beginning of the 20th century, along with other modern means of communication, including radio. For the average American who had not eaten in a restaurant in their entire life, the fast food chains that appeared in the cities offered an alternative form of restaurant in which eating was very much a public activity. The concept of a "greasy spoon" was thus born with these restaurants, in which hygiene suffered in exchange for more inexpensive food. On the other hand, there was a growing interconnected world in which trips by car, bus, and rail became increasingly available. All these means of transport were improving at the time, and soon it was necessary to feed a growing population that was "in permanent transit", frequently moving through different cities on business. George Pullman invented the sleeping car and the dining car in response to the needs of these people in the 1870s. Similarly, the English immigrant Frederick Henry Harvey was the first to use "dynamic mass movement" in restoring the Fred Harvey Company, which catered to the patrons of a chain of hotels located near railway stations, as well as offering catering, services, and high quality products on the trains themselves.

Contemporary American society also witnessed the creation of new fast foods that originated from the traditional cuisine of various ethnic groups from around the world. For example, German immigrant Charles Feltman invented the hot dog in 1867 in his stall in Coney Island, New York by pairing a frankfurter with a bread bun. Imitators such as Harry Magley and Charles Stevens soon began selling hot dogs at New York Polo Grounds baseball games. Similarly, Italian immigrants sold ice cream from vending carts in the streets or pasta at their restaurants. Chinese immigrants initially opened restaurants to cater to their fellow Chinese-Americans, but they gradually became accepted by the American clientele, sometimes resulting in truly Chinese-American cuisine such as chop suey. In this diverse world of ethnic foods, the hamburger was able to rise to mainstream popularity and become a national food of the United States.

=== White Castle System ===
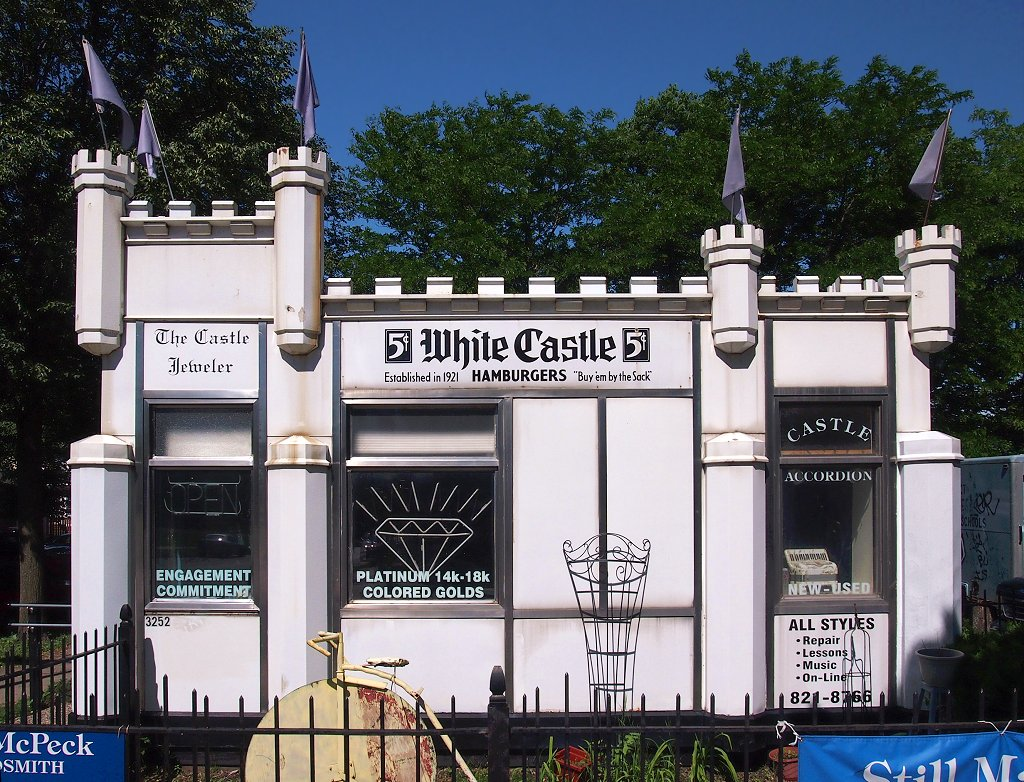
The 1936 White Castle Building No. 8 in Minneapolis, Minnesota

On November 16, 1916, chef and entrepreneur Walter "Walt" Anderson opened a hamburger stand in Wichita, Kansas, that used hygienic cooking methods, including grills and spatulas, and impressed his Wichita customers so much that many would become regular patrons. At this time, the hamburger was still not widely known by the American public. Anderson added onion rings to the burgers while they grilled, giving them a distinctive flavor. As demand increased, customers often bought his hamburgers by the dozen, giving rise to the company's subsequently popular slogan: "buy 'em by the sack". Despite some growth, Anderson had opened only four stands in the busiest areas of the city. In 1921, Edgar Waldo "Billy" Ingram collaborated with Anderson to open the first White Castle restaurant in Wichita. The restaurant was founded on the idea of cooking a hamburger quickly, giving it the honor of being the first fast food restaurant.

Ingram soon realized that the word burger evoked connotations of circus performances at livestock markets and greasy pieces of meat eaten in the poorest districts of the city in the collective mind of the American public. He tried to change those connotations from White Castle's earliest days. At the same time, he became known to some as the Henry Ford of the hamburger, while inventing a restaurant concept he called the "White Castle System", which helped the hamburger achieve fame. Between 1923 and 1931, the "White Castle System" established almost a hundred restaurants in cities throughout the Midwestern United States. In order to raise awareness among White Castle employees, a newsletter entitled "The hot hamburger" was circulated throughout the company, which challenged the employees to improve the sale of the burgers with a simple idea: to be able to prepare burgers rapidly so anyone could purchase and eat them anytime and anywhere. Instead of waiting for half an hour to be served at a traditional restaurant, the White Castle System provided rapid service and a menu centered around the hamburger. At the time, the hamburger was typically served with coffee. Upton Sinclair's The Jungle had already caused public outrage over the safety of processed meat, so by the 1920s, the general public was pleasantly surprised to see a clean and hygienic hamburger. In addition to offering clean and safe food, White Castle offered regularity and standardization, ensuring that each patty was served in the same manner in each restaurant. At the time, this was an entirely novel idea that would revolutionize the sale of food itself with a style that would come to be known as fast food. During its early years, White Castle emphasized providing quality food and coffee, and collaborated with universities to publish studies on the nutritional quality of their hamburgers.

The success of the White Castle chain was rooted largely in the power of propaganda, something that was both an original innovation and necessary to change the public's negative perception of the hamburger. In 1931, it became the first restaurant to advertise in newspapers, using its old "buy 'em by the sack" slogan. White Castle also pioneered the concept of take-out service, and the restaurant is further known for being the first to market square burgers, called "sliders", which were sold for five cents into the 1940s. White Castle was founded in March 1921 in Wichita, Kansas, by Billy Ingram and his business partner, the cook Walter Anderson, and they opened a second restaurant in Kansas City in 1924. In 1932, White Castle created its first subsidiary: Paperlynen Company, which provided the cartons and wrapping paper that the food was served in, as well as the hats worn by the kitchen staff. It acquired porcelain companies in a similar fashion, placing them in charge of building small White Castle restaurants using white porcelain facades.

Walter Anderson contributed a number of novel ideas to White Castle during its early years, including the creation of a special spatula and a special bread for the burgers. In 1947, an employee named Earl Howell calculated the amount of time that it took to break hamburgers apart in a presentable fashion, eventually leading him to create the perforated burger. By 1951, White Castle had incorporated five perforations into its burgers. Before Anderson, hamburgers were cooked on a grill for an indefinite period of time and minced meat balls were "crushed" into conventional slices of bread, like a sandwich. The meat was frozen and hamburgers came to be cooked from frozen, instead of using fresh meat. White Castle revolutionized the burger-making process by regularizing the finished products and using hygienic preparation techniques that were in clear view of the customers.

White Castle had a very large progression of sales, and its success was such, that by 1926, it had already generated competitors and imitators in the emerging hamburger business. One of these imitators also had a highly similar name, White Tower Hamburgers of Milwaukee, Wisconsin, founded by the father and son tandem of John E. and Thomas E. Saxe. The creation of White Tower led to numerous legal battles between it and White Castle during the 1930s. By 1930, White Castle already had 116 restaurants spread over a distance of 2,300 kilometres (1,400 mi), all of which were located within the United States. [1] The company eventually became a large restaurant chain, however, there has never been a restaurant outside of the United States. The American shortage of beef during World War II had little effect on sales across White Castle, due to the effect of vertical integration along with the appearance of fast food chains that operated on a franchise model that emphasized horizontal integration.

=== McDonald's era ===
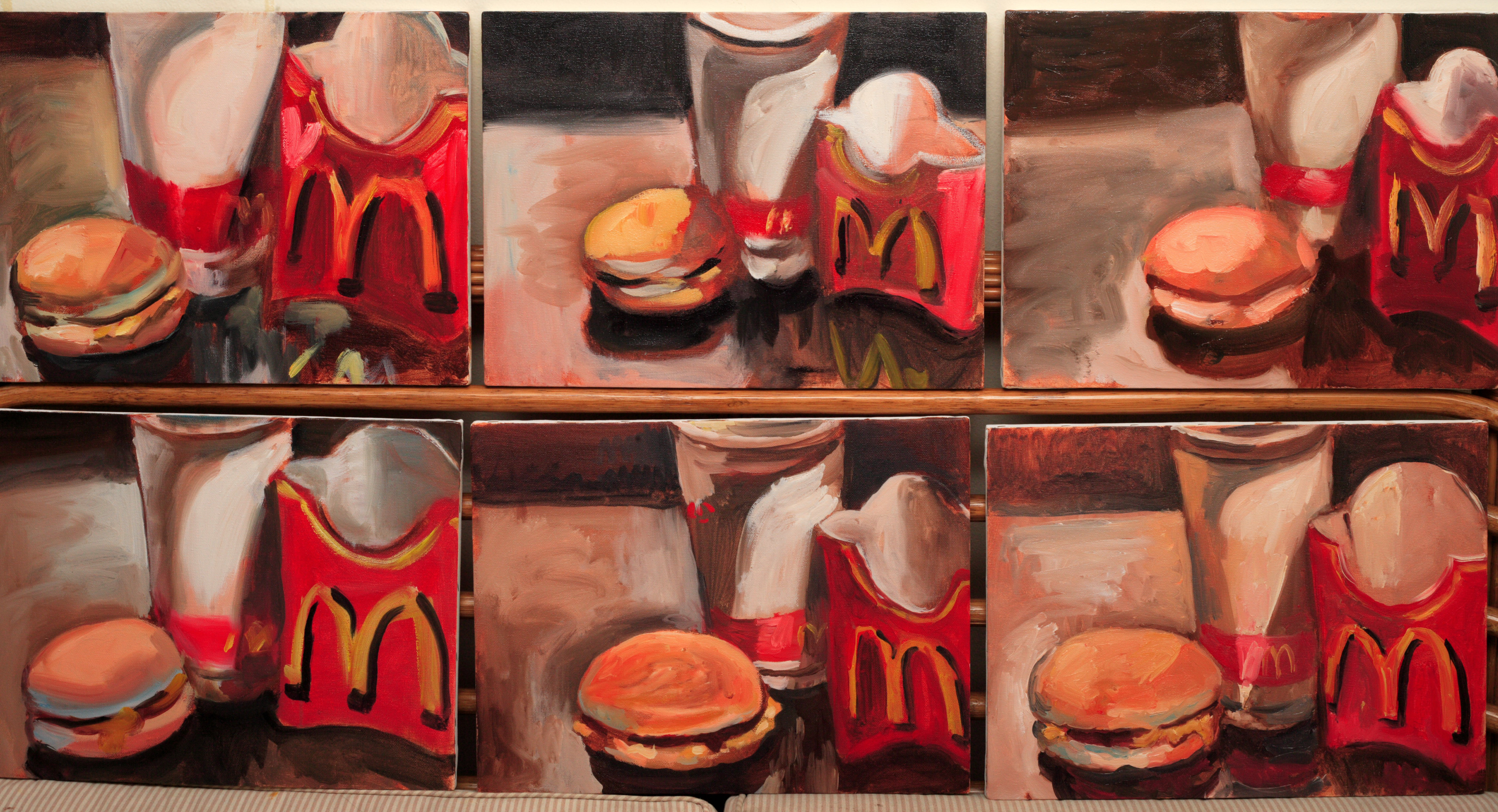
In the 1960s, McDonald's advertised the ability of a customer to eat the same burger anywhere in the United States, and a few decades later it made the same feat possible in much of the world.

In 1937, Patrick McDonald and his two sons Richard and Maurice inaugurated the simple restaurant "Airdrome" on Huntington Drive (Route 66) near the airport in the American city of Monrovia, California. The success of its sales eventually led to the May 15, 1940, opening of a restaurant named McDonald's along U.S. Route 66 in San Bernardino, California. After analyzing their sales, the brothers discovered that, to their surprise, 80% of their revenue was coming from selling hamburgers. The menu initially featured 25 different dishes, the majority of which were barbecued. Through their new restaurant, the McDonald brothers introduced the notion of fast food to parts of the Western United States by 1948. From the beginning, McDonald's focused on making hot dogs and hamburgers as efficiently and quickly as possible. During the 1940s, simple and formative concepts took root at McDonald's, including the preparation and service of burgers in just one minute and the ability for customers to eat in their own cars in a drive-in style. All the while, the restaurant was trying to further develop a hamburger that was inexpensive enough to be within the economic reach of most Americans. By the 1950s, the concept of drive-in style service had become firmly established and hamburgers and cars had become closely connected in the minds of many Americans. It was now not only possible for a customer to purchase a hamburger without getting out of a car, and a customer also no longer needed to wait to be served. The McDonald brothers built upon the achievements of their original San Bernardino restaurant when in 1953 they began franchising their now famous chain restaurants, starting in Phoenix, Arizona, and Downey, California (the latter of which is still in operation). Later, Ray Kroc opened one in the northwest Chicago suburb of Des Plaines, Illinois on April 15, 1955, which has now been converted into the McDonald's Museum. It is noteworthy that the original McDonald's mascot was a hamburger faced cook called "Speedee" that would serve as the iconographic identity of the company until being replaced by the clown Ronald McDonald in 1963.

The McDonald brothers intensively studied the existing kitchen protocol of their restaurants in an effort to improve them. They looked at different options that could increase the speed of cooking hamburgers, designing and patenting special grills that had a higher output, made their cutlery and other kitchen utensils disposable, and introduced dishwashers that reduced the costs of water, soap, and labor. The brothers also created a detailed system for operating each kitchen throughout the franchise in a similar and largely standardized manner, as well as recruiting adolescents as employees in the kitchens.

The company began to expand at a much faster rate when 52-year-old ice cream machinery salesman Ray Kroc took over as its chief executive. Kroc was the initiator of both McDonald's expansion across the United States and the definitive standardization of its burgers. He was not alone, however, as some of his co-workers were also very productive and innovative. McDonald's executive and food scientist Herb Peterson invented the McMuffin in 1972 and also the now famous greeting, "May I have your order, please?". In another key development, Jim Delligatti of the Pittsburgh franchise invented the Big Mac in 1967. The McDonald's successful expansion was mainly due to its use of the franchise system, an innovation borrowed from a sewing machine manufacturer, the Singer Corporation. Singer had developed it during the late 19th century, and it was so successful that it was soon adopted by its competitors. Nowadays, McDonald's even has its own university for training its staff: Hamburger University, located in Oak Brook, Illinois. Graduates receive a degree entitled "bachelor of hamburgerology with a minor in French fries". As McDonald's expanded into other countries, it encountered more opposition and general difficulties, as was the case in 1996 when it opened a restaurant in New Delhi amid outcry from Indian leaders. In 1995, the country with the most McDonald's restaurants (aside from the United States) was Japan, followed by Canada and Germany, while the company itself had restaurants in more than 100 countries. Throughout its history, the company has become a symbol of globalization and Western culture, sometimes resulting in it being the subject of anger and protests in various parts of the world.

=== Variants ===
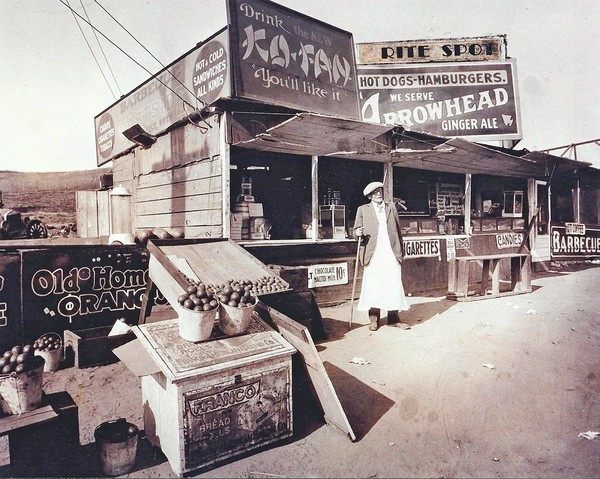
The Rite Spot in Pasadena, California

Many different variants of the hamburger have been created over the years, some of which have become very popular. Much of this diversity has been the product of other restaurant chains that have tried to reproduce the success of McDonald's and White Castle, while others served to influence McDonald's. An example of a restaurant that influenced McDonald's and its imitators is Big Boy, which was first opened in 1936 by Bob Wian in Glendale, California, and became known in that locale as Bob's Big Boy. It was at this restaurant that a major hamburger variant, the double deck cheeseburger, with two beef patties, was first made. Wian's creation was distinctively served by Big Boy restaurants with the bun sliced twice, the center slice—known as the club section—separating the two patties. The chain also popularized the drive-in restaurant format, taken and simplified by McDonald's type fast food operators. By the 1960s, Big Boy had expanded throughout the United States and Canada. Despite the benefits it provided to Wian, the chain was sold along with the rights to their signature Big Boy hamburger to the Marriott Corporation in 1967. This same year McDonald's franchisee Jim Delligatti, created an imitation of the Big Boy — the Big Mac. An example of the many McDonald's and White Castle imitators is Kewpee Hamburgers, a fast-food chain founded in 1923 in Flint, Michigan, by Samuel V. Blair as "Kewpee Hotel Hamburgs."

As with the invention of the hamburger, the exact origins of the cheeseburger are unknown. Several chefs claim to have been the first to add a slice of cheese to a hamburger. Lionel Sternberger of Rite Spot in Pasadena, California, takes credit for the cheeseburger, claiming that he invented it between 1924 and 1926. A description from a 1928 menu from the O'Dell Restaurant in Los Angeles reveals that it was serving burgers with slices of cheese at the time. Luis Ballast, owner of the Humpty Dumpty drive-in restaurant in Denver, Colorado, made an attempt to create a cheeseburger with a registered trademark known as a "yellowburger" in 1935. J.C. Reynolds, the operator of a bar in Southern California from 1932 to 1984, popularized a pimento burger. Processed cheese, the type of cheese most used in cheeseburgers, was invented in 1911 by Walter Gerber of Thun, Switzerland, although the first U.S. patent awarded for it was given to James L. Kraft in 1916. Kraft Foods went on to create the first commercial version of sliced processed cheese, which was first introduced to the market in 1950.

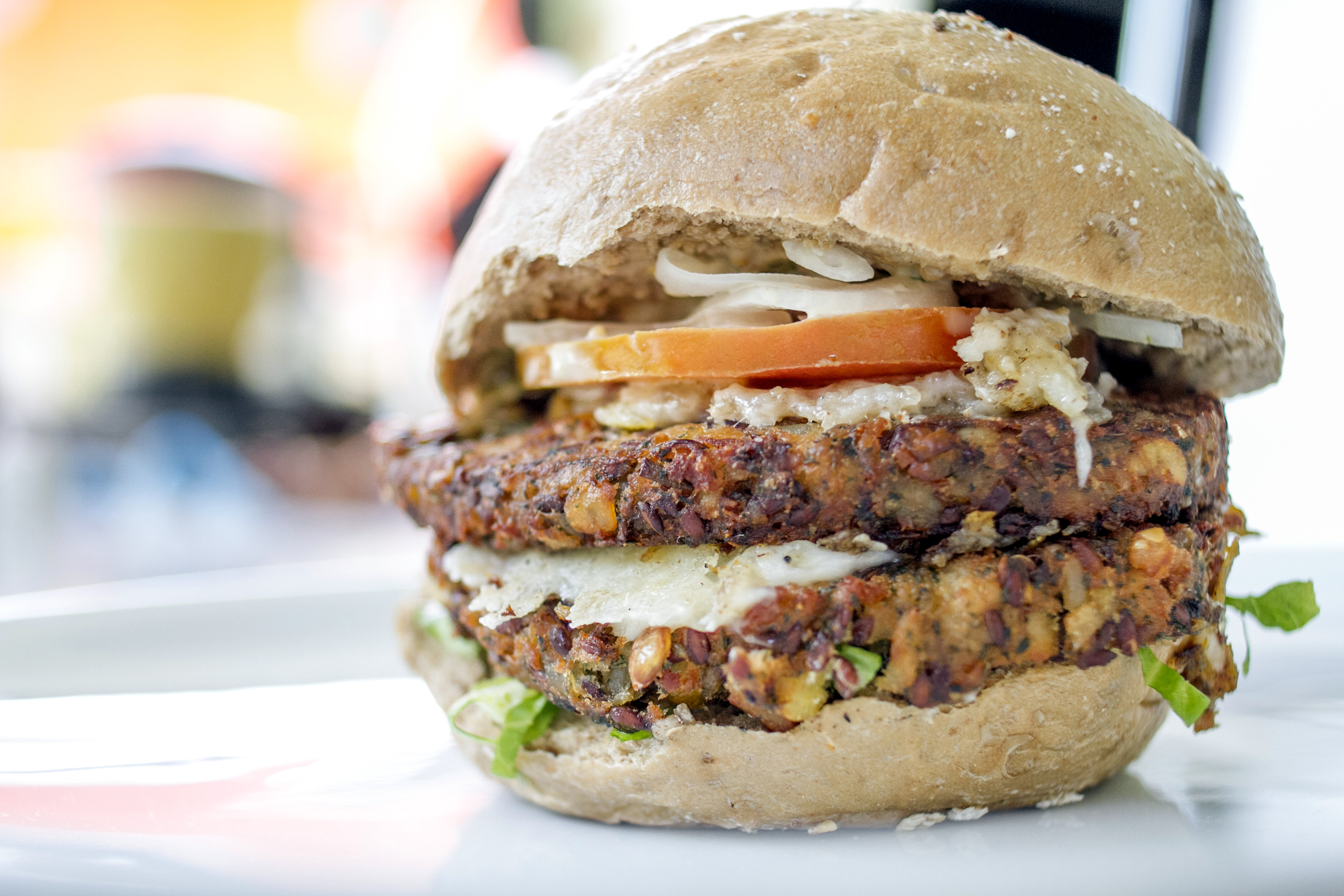
A vegan version of the hamburger

After World War II, a number of hamburger restaurants known as InstaBurger King (later Burger King) began emerging, the first of which was opened on December 4, 1954, in a suburb of Miami, Florida. It was established by James McLamore and David Edgerton, both of whom were students at the Cornell University School of Hotel Administration. McLamore had visited the original McDonald's in San Bernardino, California, when it was still owned by the McDonald brothers, and saw the potential that existed for the mass production of hamburgers. He was so inspired by this visit that he decided to create a similar burger chain himself. By 1959, Burger King already had five restaurants in metropolitan Miami, and its early success prompted McLamore and Edgerton to expand throughout the United States by using a franchise system that allowed them to grow the business at a relatively low cost. They formed Burger King Corporation as a parent company to the franchises they were selling throughout the United States. The Burger King Corporation was acquired by the Pillsbury Company in 1967, and during the 1970s, it began to expand outside the United States, principally in South America and Europe. Burger King's core product has long been the Whopper, which was created in 1957 by founder James McLamore and initially sold for 37 cents.

Wendy's was founded by Dave Thomas and John T. Schuessler on November 15, 1969, in Columbus, Ohio. By the late 1970s, it had become the third largest hamburger company in the United States. Wendy's has consistently tried to differentiate itself from other hamburger restaurants by its claim that it makes its burgers using fresh, not frozen, beef. Wendy's sparked a controversy and entered into American pop culture in the 1980s with its "Where's the beef?" advertising slogan and an accompanying campaign stressing the primacy of the beef patty over the hamburger's other ingredients.

== Marketing and popular culture ==
The hamburger was very popular among Americans during the postwar period following World War I, even in popular culture. An example of this was the prominent appearance of hamburgers in E. C. Segar's Thimble Theatre comic strip, which prominently featured a cartoon character named Popeye the Sailor who ate spinach to sustain his superhuman strength. Popeye's first appearance was as a supporting character on January 17, 1929, alongside many other characters. One of these characters was J. Wellington Wimpy (often shortened to just "Wimpy"), a lover of hamburgers who was both polite and gluttonous. His signature phrase, "I'd gladly pay you tomorrow for a hamburger today", became popular and widely known. During the height of his popularity in the 1930s, Wimpy introduced the hamburger to the youth of the time as a healthy food. It also resulted in the creation of a chain of fast food restaurants called Wimpy's in his honor, which sold hamburgers for ten cents. In a similar fashion, the fictional character Jughead Jones, who first appeared in Archie Comics in 1941, was passionate about food generally, and hamburgers specifically.

Fictional characters related to the hamburger, such as the Ronald McDonald clown character designed by Willard Scott who first appeared on television in 1963, soon became a recognizable part of American culture. The burger also made appearances in underground comix such as Zap Comix#2 during the late 1960s, in which cartoonist Robert Crumb designed a character called "Hamburger Hi-Jinx". By the end of the decade, pop art was including the hamburger as an artistic element, appearing in the works of Andy Warhol (Dual Hamburger), Claes Oldenburg (Floor Burger), Mel Ramos (Vinaburger, 1965), and more recently, David LaChapelle (Death by Hamburger, 2002).

An example of the popularity and identification that the burger enjoyed among the American public was the name of the Battle of Hamburger Hill, which occurred in May 1969 during the Vietnam War. Its name was inspired by the number of American and Vietnamese casualties, which made the scene resembles a "butcher". The hamburger was also the inspiration of Star Wars creator George Lucas's design for the Millennium Falcon ship. Hamburgers also appear in video games such as BurgerTime, released in 1982 by Data East. The hamburger also appears prominently on American television shows such as American Eats and Man v. Food.

By the 1960s, American society had become highly motorized, largely due to the 1956 Federal Highway Act passed by President Dwight Eisenhower and inspired by the German Autobahn, as well as the impressive growth rates of American automobile manufacturers at the time. Due to the extensive use of cars at the time, hamburgers were often served at drive-ins, often by waiters known as carhops. Drive-in restaurants first appeared in the United States in the early 1930s, and gradually become a common sight across the country. The ability to serve hamburgers to customers in their cars was seen as a business opportunity by countless fast-food chains, especially McDonald's. The popularity of the hamburger grew rapidly among the American population during this period, and statistics indicate that the average American was eating three burgers per week.

During the Cold War, the hamburger became a national symbol of the United States. As private outdoor social events, often held in backyards and featuring a barbecue, became more widespread during the mid-1950s, the hamburger gained a new culinary and social relevance in the country. By the late 1960s, hamburgers began to grow in size as various burger chains competed with each other, resulting in Burger King launching the Whopper and McDonald's launching the Quarter Pounder. As the race between the major chains grew more intense, the prices of their burgers increased, and the days when a hamburger could be bought for just a few cents were numbered.

In the 1970s, major hamburger chains began to use considerable resources in marketing their products. They began to compete directly with each other through their advertising, much of which was comparative and often featured direct allusions and comparisons. The event came to be jokingly referred to as the "burger wars" by many Americans. By the end of the 1980s, the era of slogans in large chain restaurants had begun.

== Global phenomenon ==
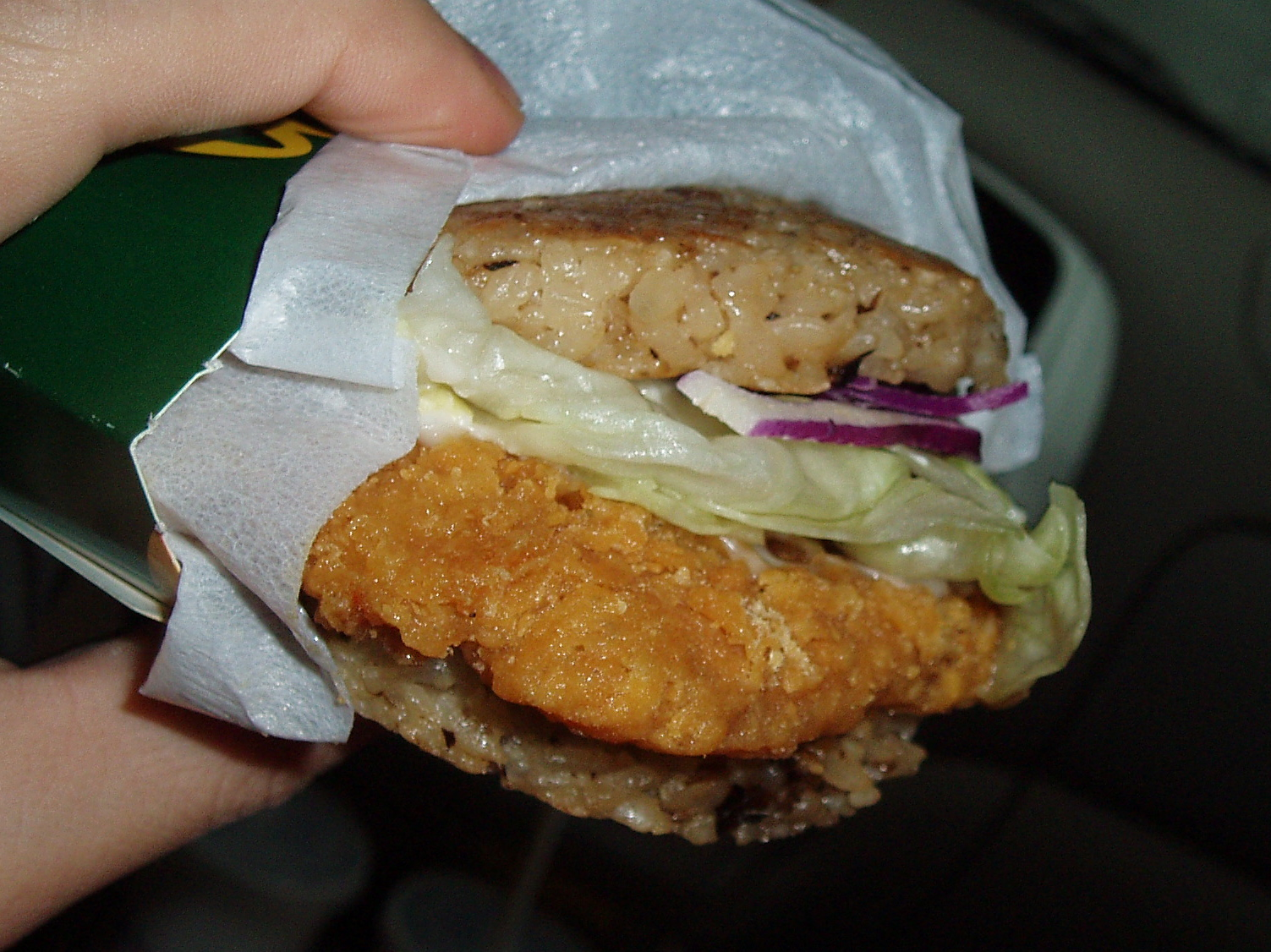
The riceburger is a product of the globalization of the hamburger.

The modern hamburger was developed in the United States, but by the end of World War II, around the middle of the 20th century, it began to spread to other countries as fast food became globalized. The main cause of this gradual globalization was the successes of the large restaurant chains. Their desires to expand their businesses and increase their profits resulted in them creating franchises around the world. McDonald's was among the first of the burger chains to take the global establishment of its brand seriously, but it was not the only one. Wimpy began operating in the United Kingdom in 1954, 20 years before McDonald's began operation in the country, and by 1970 it had expanded to over a thousand restaurants in 23 countries. On August 21, 1971, in Zaandam, near Amsterdam in the Netherlands, Ahold opened its first European franchise. In the 1970s, McDonald's began to expand into Europe and Australia. In Asia, Japan saw the establishment of its own fast food chain in 1972: MOS Burger (モスバーガー, Mosu bāgā), an abbreviation of "Mountain, Ocean, Sun", which eventually became a direct competitor to McDonald's. All of its products, however, were variations on the burger adapted to the Asian world, including the teriyaki burger, takumi burger, and riceburger. One of the first hamburger vending machines debuted in Amsterdam in 1941 under the brand FEBO, its name derived from its original place of creation, the Ferdinand Bolstraat.

At the same time the hamburger was growing in popularity around the world, it took on a variety of local features in different locations. Such examples of this include ground meat made from local animals, such as kangaroos in Australia, or Tex-Mex-style dishes like chilli con carne.

The expansion and standardization of the hamburger has led to the creation of a price index that can be used as an economic reference between different countries, known as the Big Mac Index. It measures the worth (in US$) of a burger in different parts of the world, allowing for the comparison of the purchasing power parity of 120 national economies in which McDonald's does business. American sociologist George Ritzer coined the related concept of "McDonaldization" in his 1995 book McDonaldization of Society. Another byproduct of the globalization of fast food was the creation of international competitive eating contests that involve contestants from many different countries. One of the best-known contests is the Krystal Square Off, run by the fast-food chain Krystal and sponsored by the International Federation of Competitive Eating (IFOC), which has been held annually since 2004.

== 21st century ==
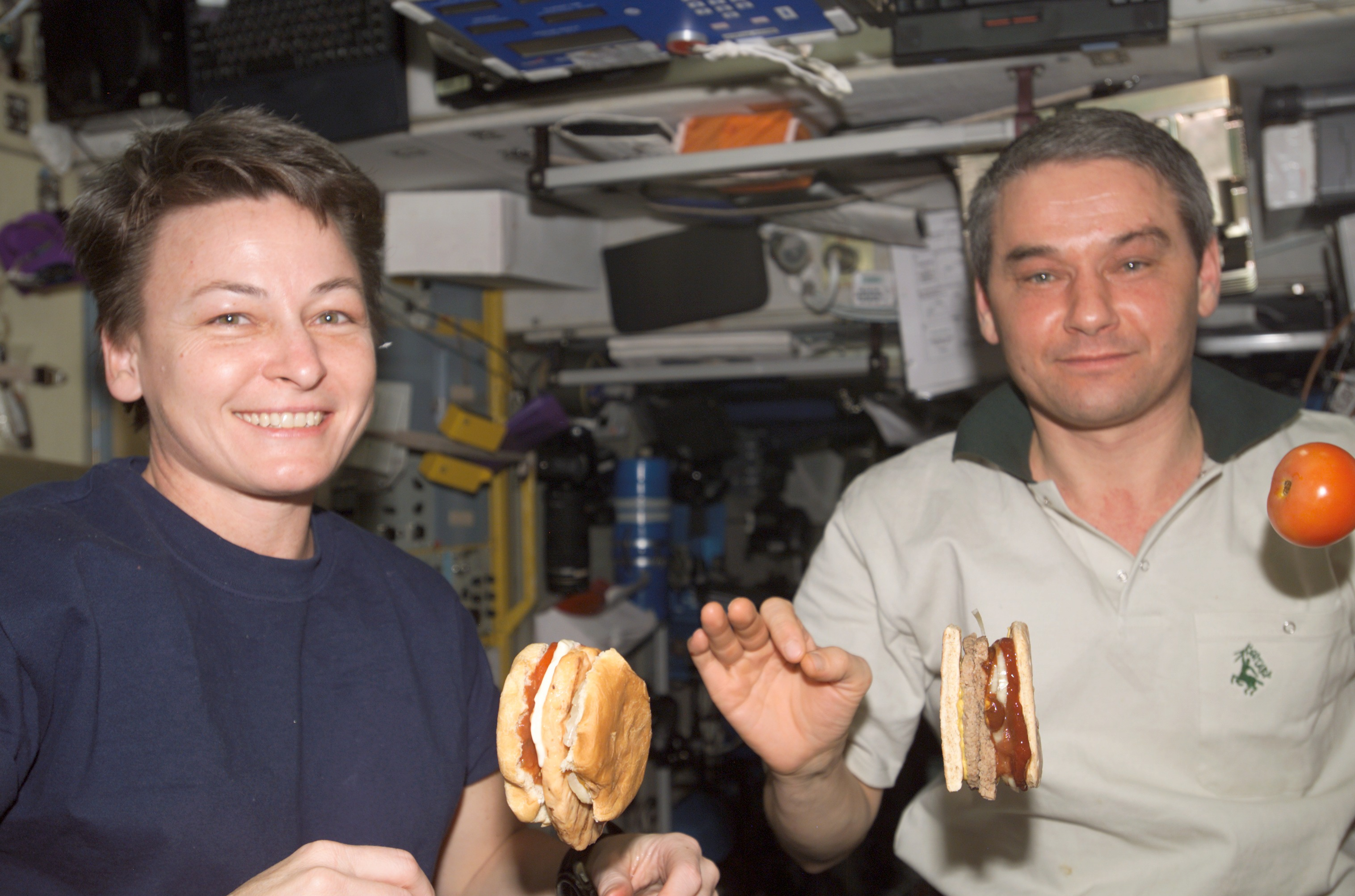
Astronauts eating hamburgers in space, thanks to the design of the space food provided at the International Space Station (ISS)

In the 21st century, the hamburger appeared as the central topic in some books on the literature of culinary topics. An example of this is Fast Food Nation: The Dark Side of the All-American Meal, published by investigative journalist Eric Schlosser in 2001, that examines the local and global influence of the American fast food industry. An example of a modern variation of the hamburger is the so-called gourmet burger, which is made by haute cuisine chefs with patties that include luxury ingredients. One of the first such burgers was cooked in New York City by chef Daniel Boulud in June 2001, and subsequently sold for US$29 with loin, ribs Bres, canned black truffles, and a mirepoix of vegetables. The Manhattan restaurant "Old Homestead", one of the oldest steakhouses in the country, offers a $44 hamburger with beef-bred Japanese wagyū. An haute cuisine burger created by Richard Blais, a student of Ferran Adrià, was introduced in 2004 at a restaurant in Atlanta, where it is served with a crystal chain and a silk ribbon. In response to the haute cuisine take on the hamburger, others have created more humble versions. Alberto Chicote of Madrid makes homemade hamburgers in his kitchen, using Iberian pork along with homemade ketchup and mustard. In 1993, Max Schondor created a hamburger made of soy. In a 2005 episode of SpongeBob SquarePants, the adventurous title character visits Mr. Krabs's popular Krabby Patty burgers, where hamburgers figure prominently in the story.

In the United States during the 20th century, there have been numerous celebrations marking the centenary of the burger. Two locations in particular organized high-profile events to celebrate 100 years of the hamburger. One was held in Athens, Texas, in November 2006, in honor of Fletcher Davis. In a resolution made by the state of Texas, it was established that Athens is the "Original Home of Hamburger". However, in August 2007, the state of Wisconsin made the same claim on behalf of the town of Seymour, the home of Charlie Nagreen who also claimed to be the creator of the hamburger. These two decisions have split the honor of creating the hamburger between these two American cities. The town of Seymour continues to annually celebrate a "Burger Fest" on the first Saturday of each August.

=== Nutritional controversies ===
Since the latter part of the 20th century, the burger has undergone several controversies regarding its nutritional values. In an era in which a growing amount of the world's population has become either overweight or more conscious of weight and the need for a healthy diet in general, the appearance of exceptionally larger burgers (popularly known as "XXL hamburgers") has generated considerable controversy. One example of this is the Triple Whopper, which surpasses the 1,000-calorie threshold established by the Health Strategy Against Obesity, which is promoted by the health institutes of the Spanish Association of Food and Nutrition Safety (AESAN). AESAN works to prevent the growth of the incidence of obesity in all people, particularly children. More generally, dietitians are beginning to see that the consumption of foods high in calories can cause excessive appetite. In response to this message, many restaurant chains have reduced the calories in their burgers since the beginning of the 21st century. The late 20th century witnessed a lawsuit brought by McDonald's against two environmental activists, Helen Steel and David Morris, that was colloquially known as the McLibel case. McDonald's took action following the publication of a pamphlet by Steel and Morris that was entitled What’s wrong with McDonald’s: Everything they don’t want you to know, which was subsequently developed into a documentary called McLibel.

=== Media ===
In 2004, Morgan Spurlock addressed the obsessive consumption of hamburgers by some Americans by directing and starring in the documentary film Super Size Me. In the film, he himself eats only McDonald's food for an entire month and documents how his health changes. That same year saw the premiere of Harold & Kumar Go to White Castle, a film in which White Castle restaurants played a vital part. Two years later, in 2006, the film Fast Food Nation presented a fictional representation of the intrigues and machinations of the meat industry on the border between Mexico and the United States. It is largely based on the 2001 book Fast Food Nation: The Dark Side of the All-American Meal.

== See also ==
- Food history
- Hamburger
- History of the hamburger in the United States
