= Louis' Lunch =

Restaurant in New Haven, Connecticut

Coordinates: 41.3064°N 72.9303°W

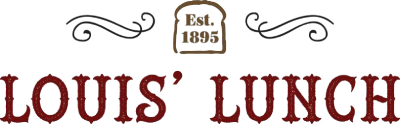

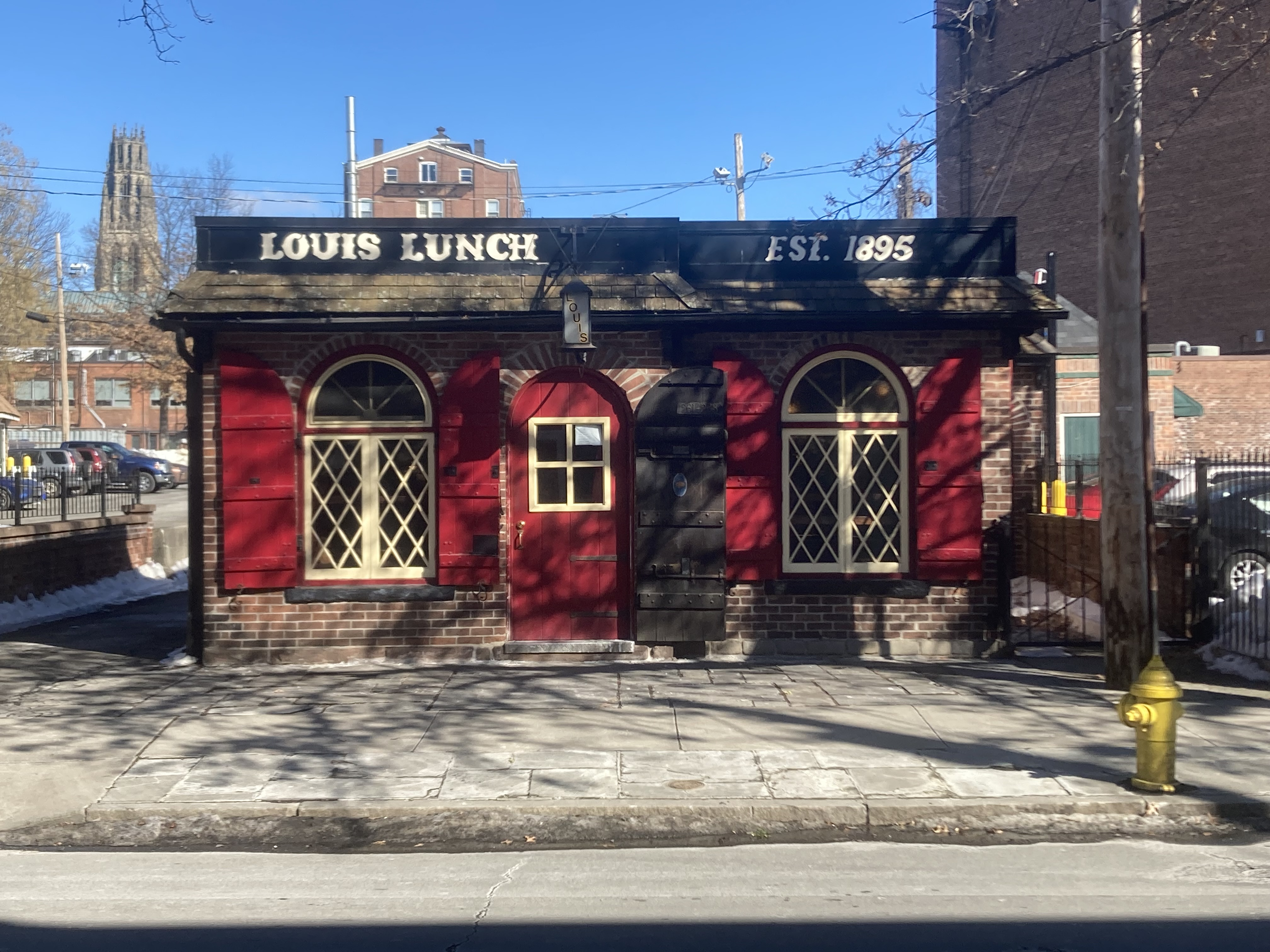
- Louis' Lunch in 2026
- Interactive map of Louis' Lunch

Restaurant information
- Established: 1895; 131 years ago
- Owner: Lassen family
- Head chef: Jeff Lassen
- Food type: Hamburgers
- Dress code: Casual
- Location: 261 Crown Street, New Haven, Connecticut, 06511, United States
- Seating capacity: 30
- Reservations: Not taken
- Website: louislunch.com

Louis' Lunch is a hamburger restaurant in New Haven, Connecticut, that claims to be the first restaurant to serve hamburgers and the oldest continuously operated hamburger restaurant in the United States. It was opened as a small lunch wagon in 1895 by Louis Lassen, and was one of the first places in the U.S. to serve steak sandwiches. According to Louis' Lunch, the hamburger was created in 1900 in response to a customer's hurried request for a lunch to go. In 1917, Louis moved the business into a square brick building that had once been a tannery.

In 1975, the restaurant was moved four blocks down to 261 Crown Street. Hamburgers are still made on the original cast iron vertical gas broilers from 1898, and the toast is made in a 1929 Savory Appliance Radiant Gas Toaster. The building is a New Haven landmark.

== History ==
Louis Lassen was born as Ludvig Lassen on July 30, 1865 to a Danish family in Ballum parish in Schleswig, a region that Denmark lost to Prussia in their 1864 war.

Lassen and his Ohio-born wife Sophia Kurtz (1862–1941) were married in Manhattan on May 25, 1889. The couple had one daughter and four sons between 1891 and 1903. Lassen died in New Haven on March 20, 1935. He and his wife are buried at Evergreen Cemetery in New Haven.

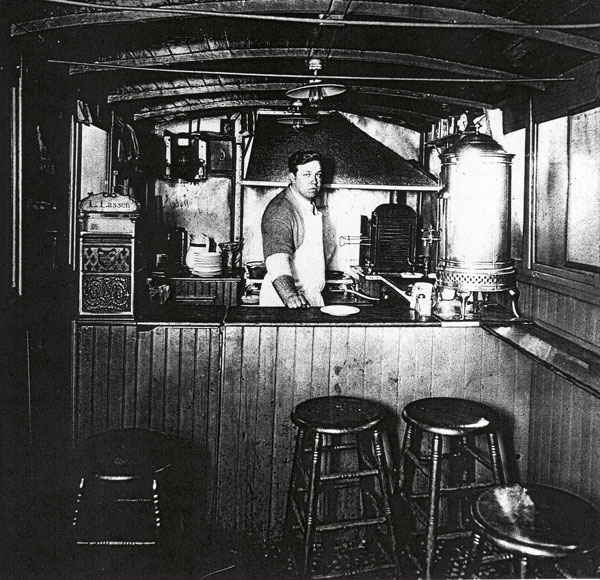
Louis Lassen's lunch wagon, circa 1907–1916

Lassen was a "blacksmith by trade and preacher by vocation" and immigrated to New Haven from Denmark in 1881. He became a food peddler, selling butter and eggs from a wooden cart. In 1895, he began adding lunch items to his cart.

In 1900, a local businessman asked for a lunch to go. According to the Lassen family, the customer exclaimed "Louie! I'm in a rush, slap a meatpuck between two planks and step on it!" Lassen placed his own blend of ground steak trimmings between two slices of toast, with America's alleged first hamburger being served.

In 1917, Lassen moved into a square brick building that had once been a tannery. Louis' Lunch was forced to move to make way for development in 1975, so it moved two blocks down to 261 Crown Street in New Haven. In the 1950s, Ken Lassen added cheese spread to the hamburger. The fourth generation of Lassens own and operate Louis' Lunch today.

== Operations ==
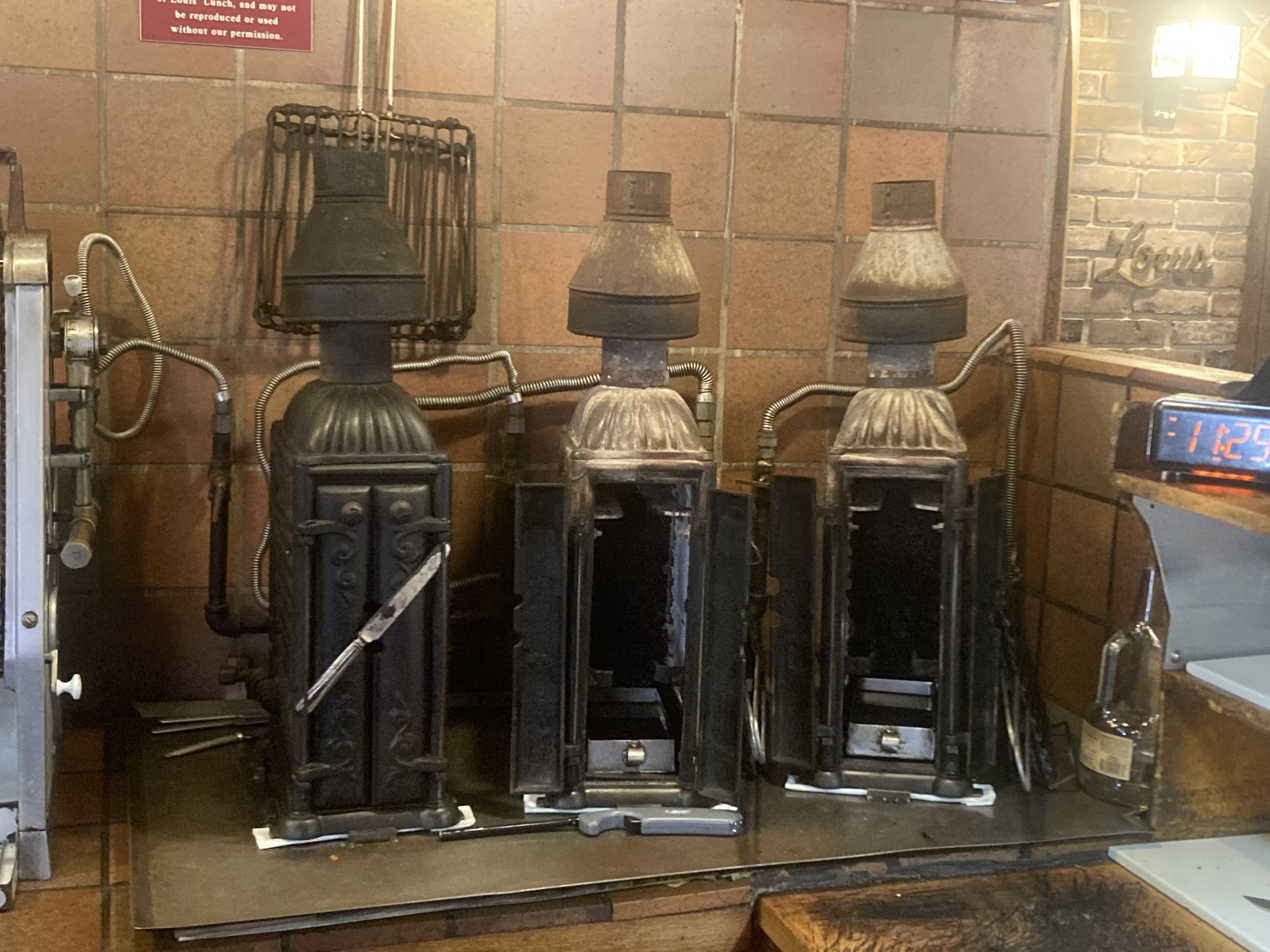
Louis's Lunch's flame broilers

The Louis' Lunch menu consists of "The Burger," potato salad, potato chips, and homemade pie. The restaurant makes their hamburger sandwiches from ground steak made from a blend of five cuts of beef. The hamburgers are then flame broiled vertically. They are prepared with cheese spread, tomato, or onion, then served on two square pieces of toasted white bread.

Louis' Lunch flame broils the hamburgers in the original cast iron vertical gas broilers manufactured by the Bridge and Beach Company in 1898. The stoves use hinged steel wire gridirons to hold the hamburgers in place while they cook simultaneously on both sides. The gridirons were made by Luigi Pieragostini and patented in 1938. A sharp cheese spread is used, as opposed to sliced cheese. The restaurant uses a 1929 Savory Radiant Gas Toaster.

The restaurant is traditionally closed during the month of August for vacation.

== Hamburger claims ==
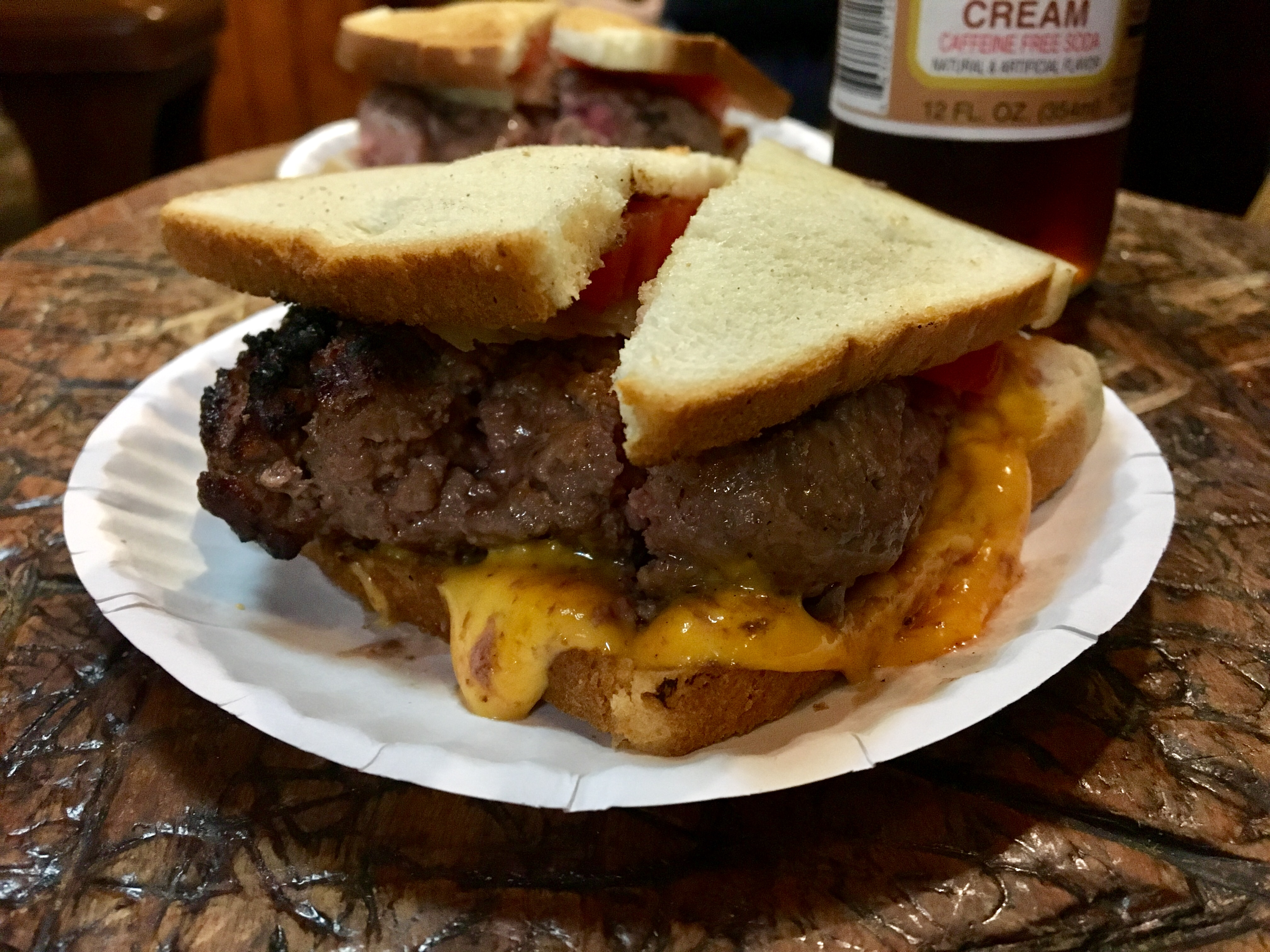
Cheeseburger with onions and tomatoes served at Louis' Lunch

Many others claim to be the creator of the hamburger, including Charlie Nagreen, brothers Frank and Charles Menches, Oscar Weber Bilby, and Fletcher Davis. White Castle traces the origin of the hamburger to Hamburg, Germany with its invention by Otto Kuase. However, it gained national recognition at the 1904 St. Louis World's Fair when the New-York Tribune declared the hamburger to be "the innovation of a food vendor on the pike."

In 2000, the Library of Congress recognized Louis' Lunch as the creator of the hamburger after being backed by U.S. Representative Rosa L. DeLauro. The Library of Congress stated that Louis Lassen sold the first hamburger and steak sandwich in the U.S. in 1900. New York magazine states, "The dish actually had no name until some rowdy sailors from Hamburg named the meat on a bun after themselves years later," noting that this claim is also subject to dispute.

Detractors of the Louis' Lunch claim include Josh Ozersky, a food editor for New York magazine. Ozersky denies the claim in The Hamburger: A History based on the definition of a hamburger. "If you say it can be on toast, you're essentially redefining the hamburger out of existence. The hamburger as the world knows it means a sandwich of ground beef on a bun." However, Motz's Hamburger America notes that the hamburger bun did not exist in 1900. Ozersky's book also notes earlier claimants and recognizes Walter Anderson for creating the modern hamburger.

In 2006, a mock trial was held by the Hamburger Festival in Akron, Ohio. Louis' Lunch was noted to have taken the event seriously, in contrast to other hamburger creator claimants. Renny Loisel, public relations director of the Greater New Haven Convention and Visitors Bureau, submitted an affidavit from the New Haven Preservation Trust and noted that the Library of Congress recognizes Louis' Lunch for creating the first hamburger. Louis' Lunch placed third in an internet poll, and Loisel noted that it was more about theatrics than truth.

An ABC News article states that it is impossible to be certain who invented the hamburger because "there is little written history. Another issue is that the spread of the burger happened largely at the World's Fair, from tiny vendors that came and went in an instant. And it is entirely possible that more than one person came up with the idea at the same time in different parts of the country."

== Reception ==
The restaurant has been featured on To Tell the Truth, the Travel Channel, the Food Network, the History Channel, and The Oprah Winfrey Show. On Travel Channel's Chowdown Countdown, Louis' Lunch was rated #1. Episode 10 of Burger Land highlights the claim and history of Louis' Lunch. Steven Raichlen claims in BBQ USA that patrons of Louis' Lunch include United States presidents George H. W. Bush and George W. Bush, Charles Lindbergh, and Artie Shaw. Food & Wine's website named Louis' Lunch as one of the "Best Burgers in the U.S." Roadfood notes that it is an "essential stop on America's burger trail."

Critics of the restaurant point to its dislike of condiments, particularly ketchup; customers who ask for it are ejected from the premises. In episode 10 of Burger Land, the "no ketchup" sign is visible hanging in the restaurant and an informative caption reads "Yale students who try to sneak in ketchup are asked to leave." Tom Gilbert writes, "Louis' Lunch is a very friendly place as long as you get with the program, which always has been about serving quality beef and making sure that nothing ruins or upstages it. As Jeff [Lassen] will tell you, that means no puffy, sweet bun, no well-done meat and no ketchup." Connecticut Museum Quest ranks it as number 2 of "the 5 Least Welcome Places for Ketchup." Esquire notes, "You can get your hamburger sandwich topped with onions, tomato, and a squirt of Cheez-Wiz. Just don't ask for anything else." A sign in Louis' Lunch reads, "This is not Burger King. You don't get it your way. You take it my way, or you don't get the damn thing."

== See also ==
- List of the oldest restaurants in the United States
- History of the hamburger
- History of the hamburger in the United States
- List of hamburger restaurants
