= Burger Land =

- Genre: Food Reality
- Directed by: Richard Bowler
- Presented by: George Motz
- Composers: Jingle Punks; Strike Audio
- Country of origin: United States
- Original language: English
- No. of seasons: 1
- No. of episodes: 11 (2 specials)

Production
- Executive producers: Matthew Ostrom; Laura Palumbo Johnson; Brian Flanagan; Dan Appel; George Motz
- Cinematography: Mitchell Frye
- Editors: Jeff Vennard; Brendan Kissane
- Running time: 21 minutes
- Production company: Magilla Entertainment

Original release
- Network: Travel Channel
- Release: September 2, 2012 – June 24, 2013

Burger Land is an American food reality television series that premiered with two special episodes airing back-to-back on September 2, 2012, on the Travel Channel. The series is hosted by food author/filmmaker and hamburger enthusiast George Motz based on his book Hamburger America. In each episode, Motz travels the country in search of the best burgers that he can find and eats in each state. The first full season premiered on April 15, 2013.

== Opening ==
Introduction (narrated by George Motz):

For years I've been crisscrossing America in search of the best hamburgers. I've written books about burgers, even made a film about them, and I have found that burgers aren't the same everywhere. From state to state, they tell a very regional story. I'm not out here to just eat any burgers. My mission is to find the good ones, the really good ones. The ones that have been around for decades, and some that are destined to become future classics. The ones that taste great, the ones that are made with fresh ground beef. Those are the burgers I want to eat. I'm on a mission to preserve the all-American hamburger, and my mission is far from over. I'm George Motz, and this is my journey. This is Burger Land.

== Episodes ==
Season	Episodes	Originally released	
Season	Episodes	First released	Last released
Specials	2	September 2, 2012	
1	11	April 15, 2013	June 24, 2013

=== Specials (2012) ===
No. overall	No. in season	Title	Original release date	Prod. code
1	1	"Wisconsin's Burger Belt"	September 2, 2012	1ABL01
In this special premiere episode, host George Motz travels to Wisconsin known as the "Burger Belt" to sample the state's best burgers. Stops include: Solly's Grille in Glendale for a state signature "butter burger" known here as a "Solly Burger" topped with stewed onions, Wedl's Hamburger Stand in Jefferson for a double cheeseburgers pan-fried in lard and topped with their special spicy ketchup sauce, Pete's Hamburgers in Prairie du Chien for their poached burgers with steamed onions, and The Village Bar in Madison for a steamed-melting cheeseburger topped with hand-cut Brick cheese and fried onions.
2	2	"New Jersey Sliders"	September 2, 2012	1ABL02
George samples the best burgers New Jersey has to offer. Stops include: White Manna in Hackensack for their classic "sliders" with double the meat, steamed cheese and onions and White Rose Diner in Linden where he is joined by local hamburger expert and blogger Nick Solares for their version of a slider, a 3-ounce cheese slider with onions and learns what a "Jersey Burger" is, topped with Taylor Ham, Rossi's Bar & Grill in Trenton for their famous broiled nearly one-pound burger. Lastly, Nick rejoins him to try the Brazilian-style hamburgers at Hamburgao in Newark, a steak topped with mozzarella, bacon, ham, egg, corn, potato sticks, lettuce, tomato and spicy mayo.

=== Season 1 (2013) ===
No. overall	No. in season	Title	Original release date	Prod. code
3	1	"Hollywood Hamburgers"	April 15, 2013	1ABL03
In the series preimere, George travels to California to try Tinseltown's glamorous burgers. Stops include: Pie 'N Burger in Pasadena, birthplace of the cheeseburger, to try their traditional double cheeseburger topped with their special thousand island dressing, Marty's Hamburger Stand in West Los Angeles, home of "The Combo", a cheeseburger with a sliced Vienna beef hotdog on top, The Apple Pan also in West Los Angeles for a 66-year-old burger recipe, the smokey "Hickory Burger" a cheeseburger topped with their secret hickory sauce. George joins comedy writer Brad Morris at Charlie's Coffee Shop at the Farmer's Market in Los Angeles to sample their classic cheeseburger on a whole-wheat bun with market-fresh lettuce, onions and tomatoes. Also, he has a conversation about burgers with actor Jeff Garlin here. The last stop is at Irv's Burgers in West Hollywood, a hamburger stand that is endangered of closing its doors after 63 years.
4	2	"Miami's Cuban Frita"	April 22, 2013	1ABL04
George visits Miami to sample the Latin-inspired burgers. Stops include: El Rey de las Fritas ("The King") in Little Havana for a classic Cuban Frita, a cuban-style hamburger made with spiced ground beef, topped with frita mojo, a garlic-based sauce and thinly fried potatoes, sometimes cheese and served on a Cuban roll. He invites local food blogger "Burger Beast" to try their competitor El Mago ("The Magician") just down Calle Ocho (8th Street) to sample their version of a Cuban Frita which was the first to introduce cheese on their patties and is topped with their secret mojo sauce, Latin Burger and Taco, a food truck that serves up their signature burger, the "Latin Macho", a double cheeseburger blended with spicy chorizo topped with caramelized onions and a red pepper crema sauce (also shown here is the "Taco Macho", which features everything from the Latin Macho wrapped up in a tortilla), and lastly, Pincho Factory on the outskirts of town in Westchester where "Burger Beast" rejoins him for their "Toston Burger", a cheeseburger topped with lettuce, tomatoes, and homemade cilantro mayo served on a tostones (fried plantain) bun.
5	3	"New Orleans Po' Boy Burgers"	April 29, 2013	1ABL05
George visits New Orleans to see what burgers the town's different parishes has to offer. Stops include: Bozo's Restaurant & Oyster Bar in Metairie where they serve up a hamburger po'boy, black angus patty topped with caramelized onions and cheese on a traditional Leidenheimer French Bread, Port of Call on the quiet end of Bourbon Street for their Mushroom Cheddar Burger, an 8-ounce char-broiled patty covered in cheese and mushrooms sautéed in red wine and butter served with a loaded baked potato. He invites local burger expert T.G. Herrington to join him at Ted's Frostop Burgers, famous for their frosty rootbeer and their "Lot-O-Burger", a cheeseburger served either on a sesame seed sweet bun or po'boy bread topped with secret mayo & mustard-based "Lot-O Sauce", and lastly, The Camellia Grill on Carrollton Avenue to sample their version of a bacon cheeseburger topped with grilled onions.
6	4	"Houston, We Have a Burger"	May 6, 2013	1ABL06
George travels to Texas to sample Houston's biggest and best burgers. Stops include: Christian's Tailgate Bar & Grill, a former icehouse that serves their most popular burger, the bacon jalapeno cheeseburger with pickled jalapenos and deep-fried bacon, meeting the town mayor Glenn Royal at Tookie's Hamburgers in Seabrook to try "The Squealer", a cheeseburger with bacon ground into the patty served on a buttered bun. Next he invites local food writer Robb Walsh to Blake's Bar-B-Q & Burgers to eat their classic cheeseburger with a secret seasoned patty served on a toasted buttered-soaked buns. The last stop is Stanton's City Bites, a convenience store in the center of the city known for their ground in-store meat blends in their classic bacon cheeseburger with a chuck-and-brisket patty on a challah bun served with waffle fries. Also, he takes a side trip to the Johnson Space Center to sample freeze-dried "space burgers".
7	5	"New Mexico's Green Chile Cheeseburgers"	May 13, 2013	1ABL07
George travels to New Mexico to try the state's best red and green chile cheeseburgers. Stops include: The Owl Cafe & Bar in San Antonio, the originators of the green chile cheeseburger; The Pantry Restaurant in Santa Fe the Tortilla Burger, a burger patty topped with pinto beans wrapped in a flour tortilla and smothered in red chile sauce and served with curly fries. He then meets up with food writer of The Santa Fe New Mexican Rob DeWalt at Bobcat Bite also in Santa Fe to get their legendary 10-ounce green chile cheeseburger. Then it's off to Bode's, a general store in Abiquiu serving up caramelized green chile half-pound cheeseburgers on a sesame seed bun served with tater tots and a pickle.
8	6	"Old Miss Burgers"	May 20, 2013	1ABL08
George heads to Northern Mississippi, home of the blues, to sample the state's "slug burgers" (secret ingredients mixed into the ground beef). Stops include: Bill's Hamburgers in Amory to try their flat-top cooked secret smashed burgers with mustard and caramelized onions; Lamar Lounge in Oxford home to pop singer Eddie Fishers' 1860s bar to get a "Lamar Burger", an 8 oz. flat-top charred Angus beef cheeseburger served with homemade fries; Phillips Grocery in Holly Springs for an over 80-year-old secret beef mixture recipe, double cheeseburgers cooked on an old griddle topped with raw onions, pickles and mustard; and lastly he meets local burger expert John T. Edge, director of Southern Foodways Alliance, at Latham's Hamburger Inn in New Albany for their version of a "dough burger" (which has flour mixed into the ground beef) deep-fried in an 85-year-old skillet and topped with mustard, onions and pickles served with tater tots.
9	7	"The Classics of NYC"	May 27, 2013	1ABL09
George travels to his hometown of New York City to taste his favorite burger joint. Stops include: J.G. Melon on the Upper East Side with NYC mayor Michael Bloomberg for a classic flat-top grilled cheeseburger with a patty made from a mix of chuck, sirloin tips, and short ribs. Next he meets Food Film Festival executive producer Seth Unger at Minetta Tavern Restaurant & Bar in Greenwich Village for their "Black Label Burger", a patty with four locally-butchered prime cuts (short rib, skirt steak, brisket and dry-aged ribeye) topped with caramelized onions and braised in four coats of butter on a toasted sesame seed bun, Donovan's Pub Family Restaurant in Woodside, Queens for their flame-broiled cheeseburger with a secret steak blend patty on a cheese-draped bun. Lastly, George meets up with burger blogger David "Rev" Ciancio of Burger Conquest at Korzo, a Slovakian restaurant in his neighborhood of Park Slope, Brooklyn for a flame-grilled burger wrapped in a Slovak-Hungarian dough called "lángos" (along with Edam cheese, pickles and homemade mustard) and deep-fried.
10	8	"Tennessee Blues Burgers"	June 3, 2013	1ABL10
George travels to Tennessee to try the state's "blues burgers" on Beale Street, home of the blues. But first it's off to Nashville, country music capital to sample their best burgers. Stops include: Rotier's Restaurant for their signature "Grilled Cheese Burger", a grilled cheese sandwich with a flat-top grilled burger patty in the middle of sandwich bread, Fat Mo's, an Iranian-style big hamburger drive-thru where the patties are soaked in a secret marinade with 18 spices. He gets their half-pound "Double Mo", two 1/4-pound cheeseburger patties, lettuce, tomatoes, pickles and onions served on a sesame seed bun. Next he heads to Memphis to visit world-famous Dyer's Burgers for their deep-fried hamburgers fried in 100-year-old grease with "Best Memphis Burger" blogger Seth Agranov; there, they get "Double-Doubles", two cheeseburger patties topped with pickles and onions. Finally, the two head to Alex's Tavern for their "Greek Burger", 6-ounce patty with double cheese (mozzarella and American) topped with tomato, pickles and Greek spices (salt, garlic, pepper) on a soft bun.
11	9	"Carolina Style Burgers"	June 10, 2013	1ABL11
George travels to the North Carolina to try their "Carolina-style" burgers (topped with chili, onions, mustard and coleslaw). Stops include: Duke's Grill in Monroe for their sloppy Southern burger, an egg and breadcrumb mixed patty topped with cheese, meaty chili, onions and coleslaw on a soft bun. Then it's off to Charlotte, the "Queen City", to South 21, a classic drive-in with curb service that serves their signature "Super Boy" burger, two patties topped with mustard, onions, lettuce and tomatoes on a toasted sesame seed bun, but he opts for their "Jumbo Cheeseburger", a "Super Boy" with cheese added. Next NASCAR race engineer Josh Browne joins him at Diamond Restaurant in the Charlotte's Plaza Midwood area to get their car engine themed burgers. They get the "Big Block Burger", a southern-style burger, two 1/3 pound patties topped with slaw, chili and pimento cheese. Lastly, the two visit Brooks' Sandwich House in the historic arts district of North Charlotte North of Davidson Street (NoDa) for their cheeseburger served all-the-way (mustard, onions and a 40-year-old chili recipe).
12	10	"A Burger is Born"	June 17, 2013	1ABL12
George travels to Connecticut, birthplace of the hamburger. Stops include: Louis Lunch in New Haven, established in 1895 and serving the first hamburger in the U.S. since 1900. He orders their hamburger sandwich, medium rare salt & pepper seasoned beef patty broiled in an upright oven from 1898 topped with a sharp-cheddar spread, grilled onion and a tomato between two slices of toast, Shady Glen Dairy Stores in Manchester for the "Bernice Original", a decades-old flat-top patty topped with an American "cheese crown" (corners are fried on flat-top) between a soft bun, World Famous Ted's Restaurant in Meriden for their signature steamed cheeseburgers topped with steamed gooey white cheddar cheese, onion, tomato, lettuce, and mustard, and lastly, George brings his former college roommate Chris Fisher to Harry's Place, a drive-in in Colchester to sample their famous cheeseburger, a classic 80/20 chuck patty topped with white American cheese, pickles and sautéed onion seasoned with butter and paprika on a soft bun.
13	11	"Windy City Burgers"	June 24, 2013	1ABL13
George travels to the Chicago to sample the Windy City's best burgers. Stops include: Billy Goat Tavern & Grill in the heart of downtown for their world famous Saturday Night Live special "Triple Cheezborger! Cheezborger! Cheezborger!", three 85/15 lean patties topped with American cheese and sautéed onions on a Kaiser roll. George brings his burger-loving friend, Jay Castaldi, to Kuma's Corner on the northwest side, for their heavy metal-inspired burgers. They order their famous "Kuma Burger", a twice-ground 10-ounce flame-grilled patty topped with cheddar cheese, bacon, a fried egg, lettuce, tomato and onion on a pretzel bun. Next, after sampling some freshly-ground beef at The Butcher and Larder, he and his burger enthusiast friend, Kelly Borrisey, visit Top Notch Beefburgers on the south side in Beverly for "The King Size", a flat-top 1/2-pound beef round patty topped with steamed American cheese, grilled onions, lettuce and tomato on a soft bun. Lastly, he heads 1/2 hour north of the city to Evanston to meet Jay at The Wiener and Still Champion for their "Double Char Burger", a char-broiled patty topped with Merkts sharp cheddar spread, grilled onions and country fried bacon on a challah bun.
