= Kuma's Corner =

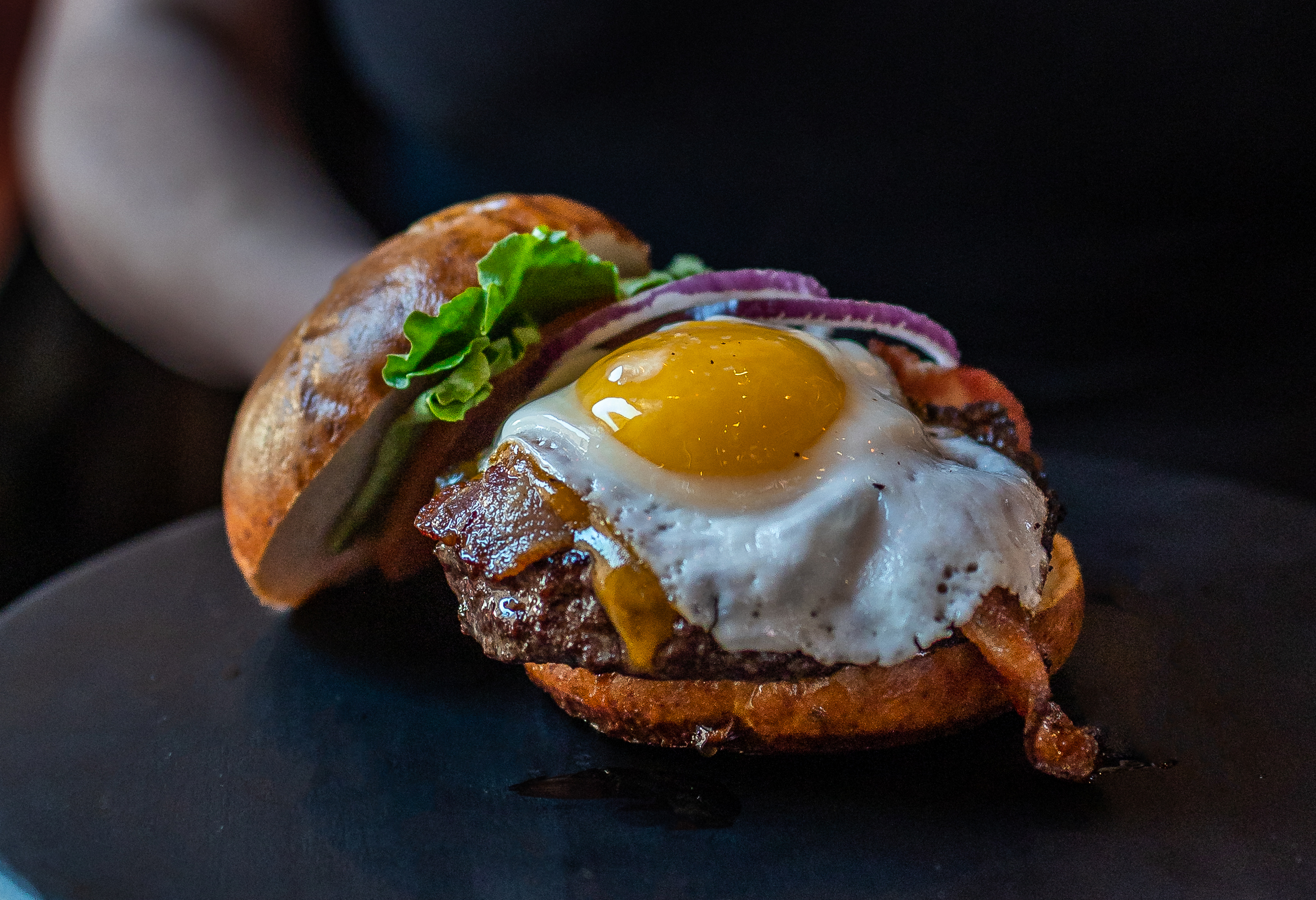
- Kuma burger at Kuma's Corner

Restaurant information
- Established: 2005
- Food type: Hamburger restaurant
- Location: 2900 W Belmont Ave, Chicago, Illinois, United States
- Website: kumascorner.com

Kuma's Corner (Kuma's) is a burger restaurant with a heavy-metal theme based in Chicago, Illinois.

== History ==
Kuma's Corner first opened in 2005 in Chicago's Avondale neighborhood. Since then Kuma's has opened locations in Chicago's Fulton Market, as well as in Schaumburg and Indianapolis, and a second Chicago location in Fulton Market.

In 2024, Kuma Holdings, the parent company of Kuma's Corner, filed for Chapter 11 bankruptcy, blaming the effects of the COVID-19 pandemic as prompting the decision. The company planned to keep operating its restaurants while restructuring.

== Menu ==
Kuma's serves specialty hamburgers. Its burgers have been described as the best in Chicago, as well as the best in the United States. In 2014, Kuma's Ghost Burger was named one of the most influential burgers of all time by TIME Magazine. The ghost burger included a ghost pepper aioli, and was topped with an unconsecrated communion wafer.

Kuma's Corner has been credited with inspiring other restaurants to incorporate creative ingredient combinations into their own offerings. In particular, Kuma's Corner played a role in popularizing the pretzel bun, now a staple in many burger restaurants.

== Media ==
In 2013, Kuma's Corner was featured on an episode of the Travel Channel show Burger Land.

== Controversy ==
In 2013, Kuma's Corner faced criticism from Chicago’s Catholic community over the so-called "Ghost Burger" which was named after the Swedish heavy-metal band Ghost and featured a communion wafer on top. Despite Kuma's offers to donate portions of the proceeds, the Archdiocese of Chicago and other Catholic organizations expressed their offense and called for a boycott of the restaurant.

In 2020, the company faced accusations of racist and homophobic behavior by management. These issues were acknowledged publicly by the owner, Ron Cain. The company responded publicly by announcing steps such as third-party training on subjects such as diversity and interpersonal relations, and introducing measures for staff and managers to communicate about their concerns. Chef and manager of the Indianapolis branch, Luke Tobias, announced shortly afterwards he was parting ways with the restaurant. Shortly afterwards it announced a new director of operations.

== See also ==
- List of hamburger restaurants
