= Old North Charlotte (Charlotte neighborhood) =

Coordinates: 35.248°N 80.800°W

- Interactive map of Old North Charlotte
- Country: United States
- City: Charlotte, North Carolina
- Founded: Late 19th century

Population (2008)
  - Total: 687,456

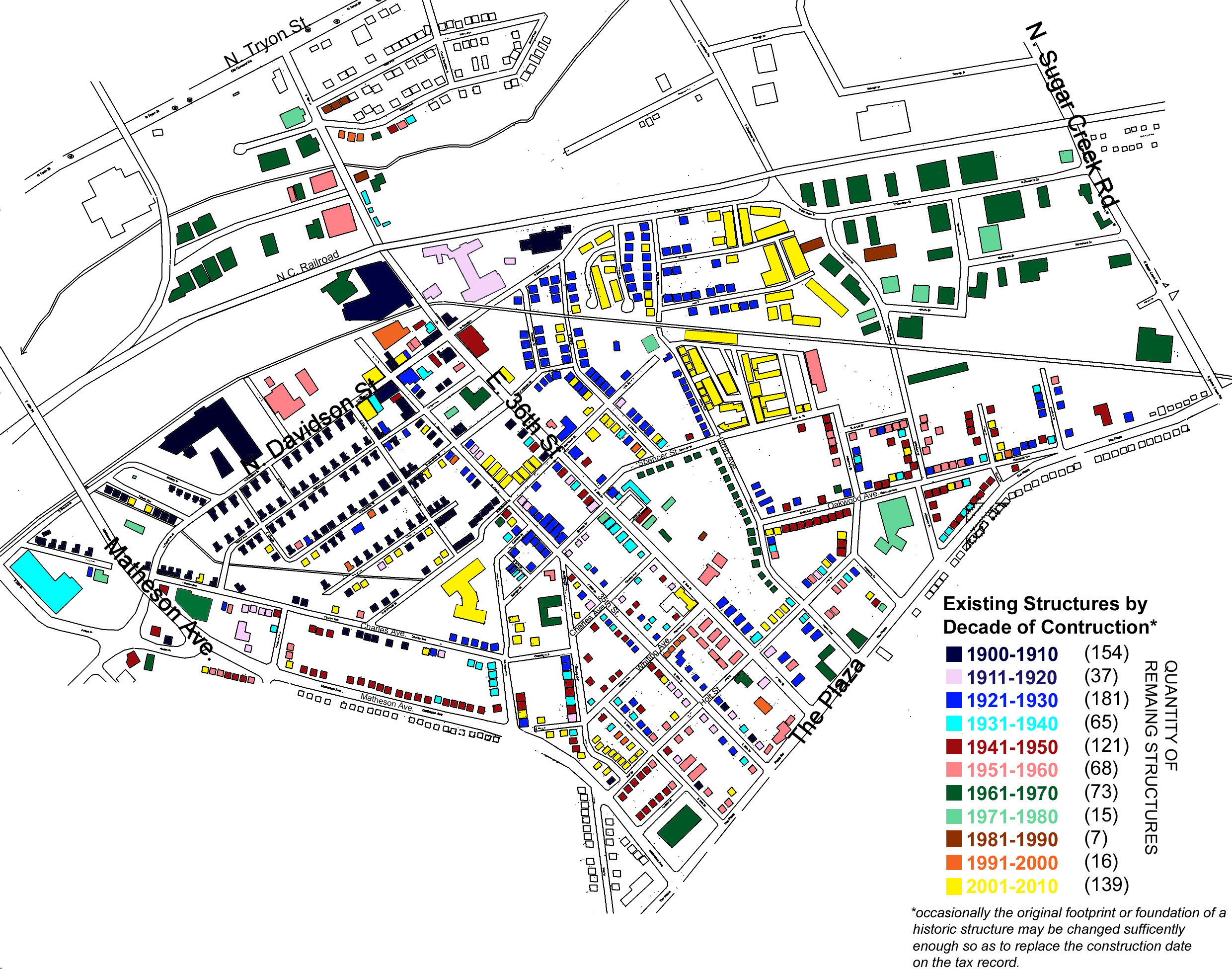
Map showing the on-file construction dates of every structure in Old N. Charlotte

Old North Charlotte is a neighborhood in Charlotte, North Carolina. Old North Charlotte, contrary to its name, comprises a large section of the city's east side.

Old North Charlotte is one of Charlotte's oldest neighborhoods and can trace its history back to the early 1880s when Mecklenburg's economy was still heavily reliant on the textile industry. As a result, many former mill buildings dot the landscape of the area which is home to Charlotte's arts district, North Davidson, or "NoDa".

Following World War II Old North Charlotte was much like any of the other mill towns throughout the piedmont region. Workers lived in similar looking company-owned homes on what was then the northern edge of Charlotte (this is how the area gets its name).

In 1975 Old North Charlotte was home to the city's last surviving textile mill, Johnston Mill, which would cease operations soon thereafter. After this the area was plunged into a home of widespread poverty and crime, most notably prostitution. The 1990s saw the success of an effort led by community figures such as church leaders to clean up the area; in doing so the area became more attractive to development due to its location close to Uptown Charlotte.

== Boundaries ==
The boundaries of Old North Charlotte are different from the boundaries of its "arts district" synonym NoDa. The official neighborhood of Old North Charlotte is bounded on the West side by Matheson Avenue & Clemson Avenue; on the North side by the North Carolina Railroad tracks; on the East side by Eastway Drive; on the South side by The Plaza. This means the recognized social demographics of Old North Charlotte are very different than that of NoDa.

The meeting room above the Hand Pharmacy (1900) hosted one of the few attempts at unionizing the labor pool in Old North Charlotte. Today it is home to NoDa's Cabo Fish Taco restaurant.

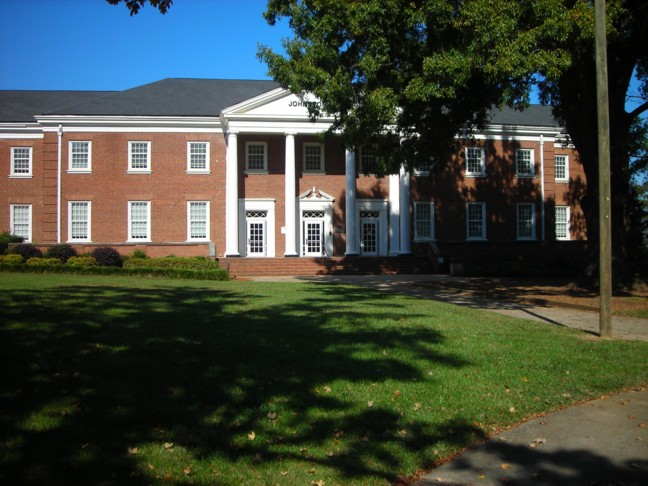
The neo-classical architecture of the Johnston YMCA has stood proud over Old North Charlotte for 50+ years

== Parks ==
- North Charlotte Park (Spencer Street and Herrin Avenue)
- Charles Ave. Park (Charles Avenue @ Pinkney Street)
- Clemson Ave. Park (Charles Avenue @ Clemson Avenue)

== Schools ==
- Highland Montessori School
- Garinger High School (in nearby Shamrock)
