= Charlie Nagreen =

American claimant of inventor of the hamburger

Charles R. Nagreen (2 May 1870 – 5 June 1951), known as "Hamburger Charlie", was an American claimant to the title of inventor of the hamburger.

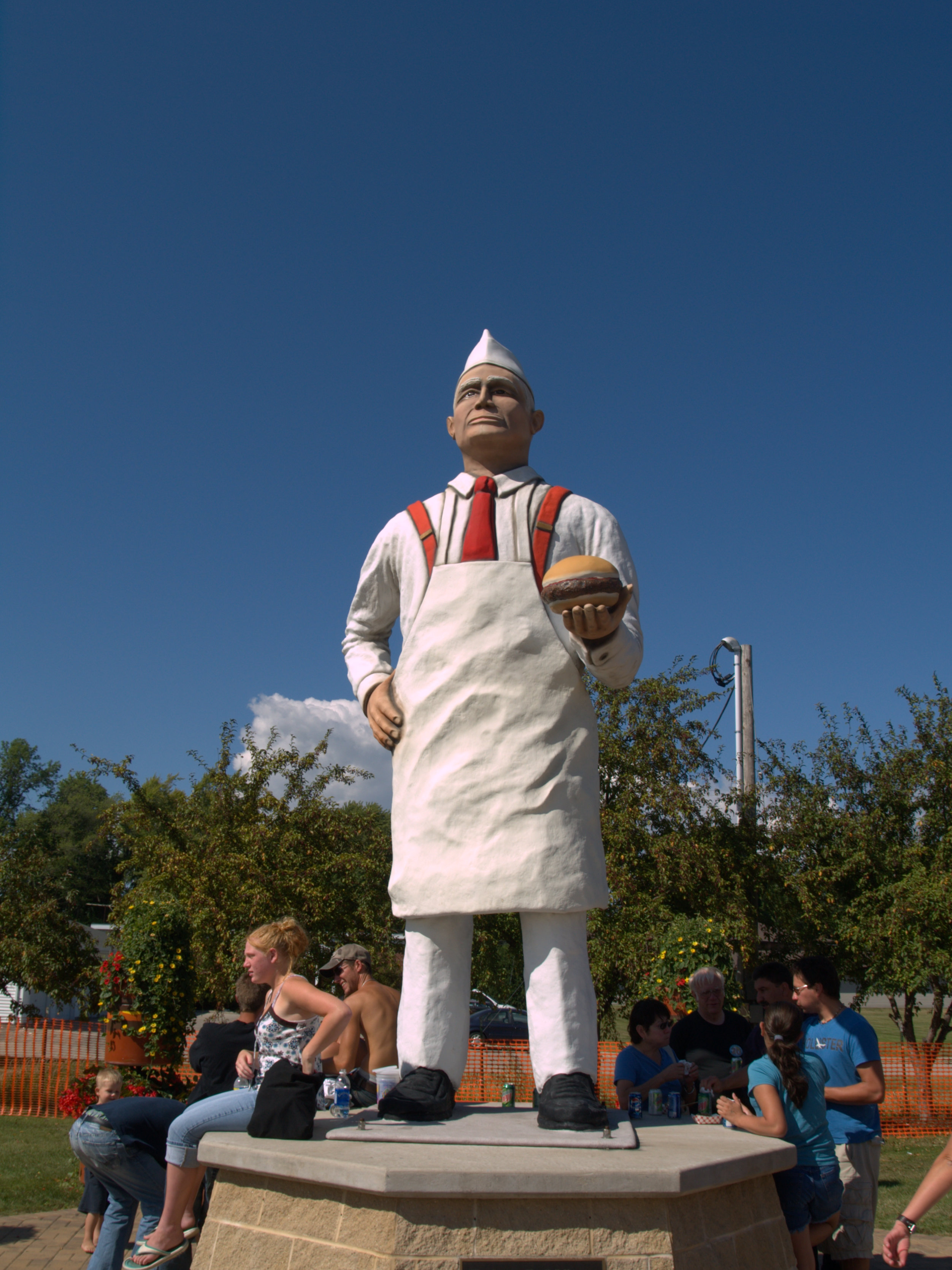
Hamburger Charlie Statue

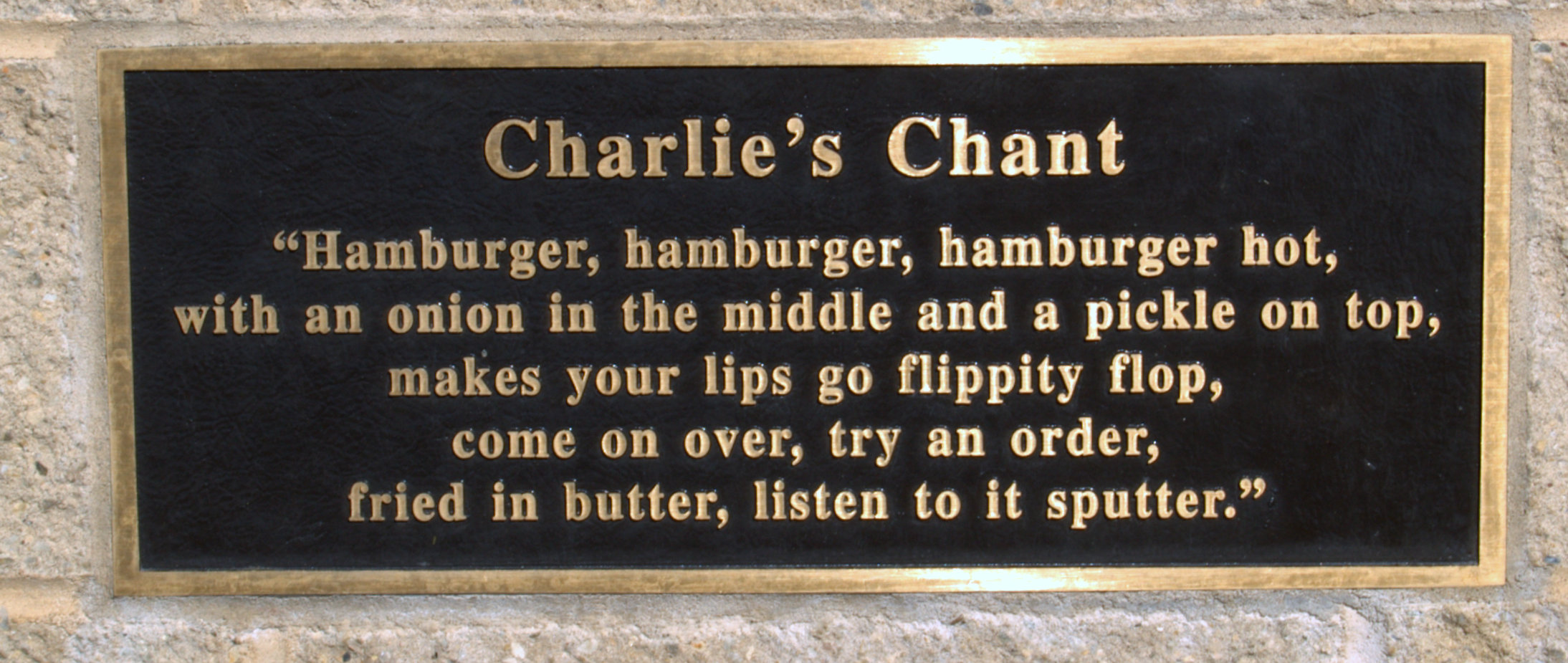
Plaque showing Charlie's chant on Hamburger Charlie statue in Seymour, Wisconsin

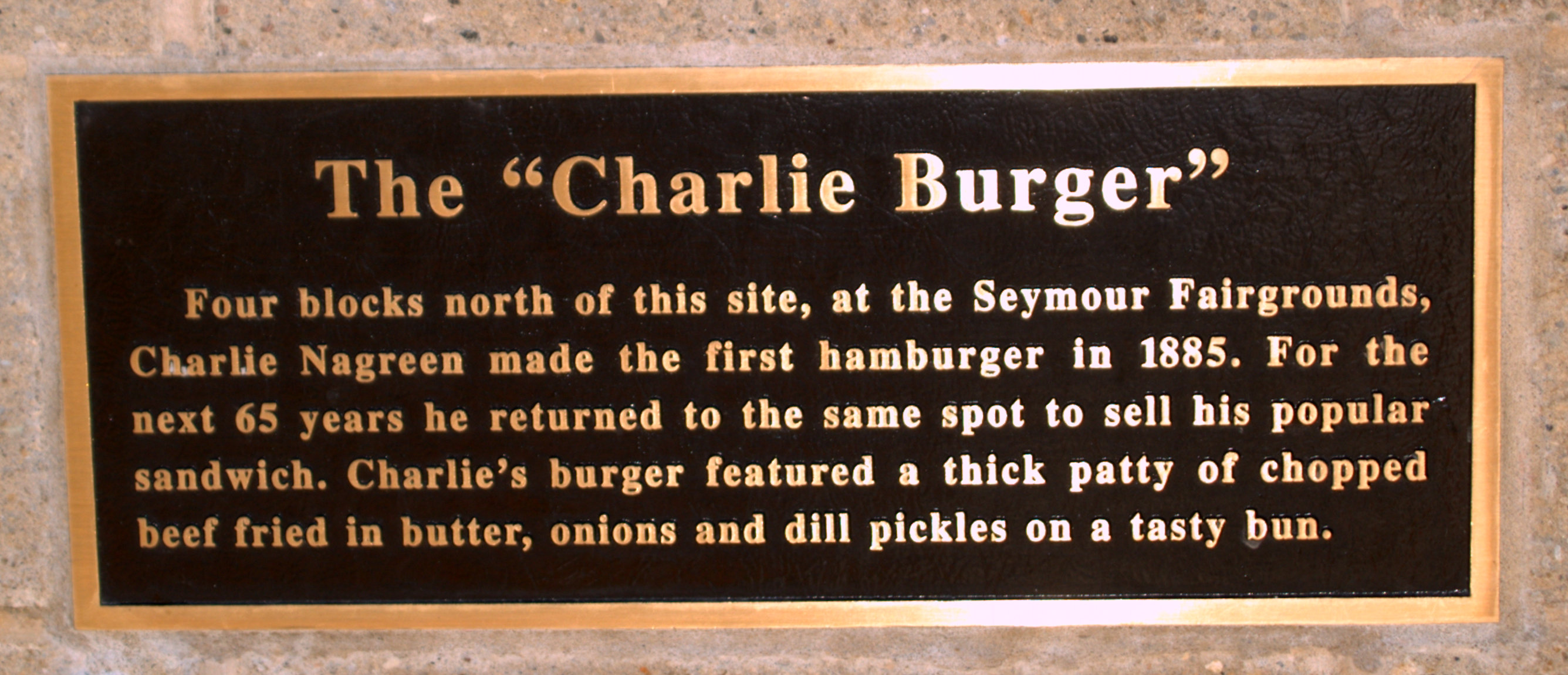
Plaque showing The Charlie Burger on Hamburger Charlie statue in Seymour, Wisconsin

== Career ==
Born in Hortonville, Wisconsin, Nagreen was a 15-year-old vendor at the 1885 Seymour Fair. After not experiencing success selling meatballs, he had an idea. Knowing that the visitors to the fair would be hungry after gazing at the exhibits but would not be able to walk and eat, he smashed a meatball and placed it between two slices of bread. His idea was a success, and he returned every year until his death in Appleton, Wisconsin, in 1951.

== Controversy ==
The name of the hamburger came from the idea of "Hamburg steak", or ground beef. Since this was a popular item in Seymour at the time of the 1885 fair, Nagreen decided to call the sandwich the "Hamburger". This version of events is supported by local history organizations.
