= Hamburger =

Ground beef patty

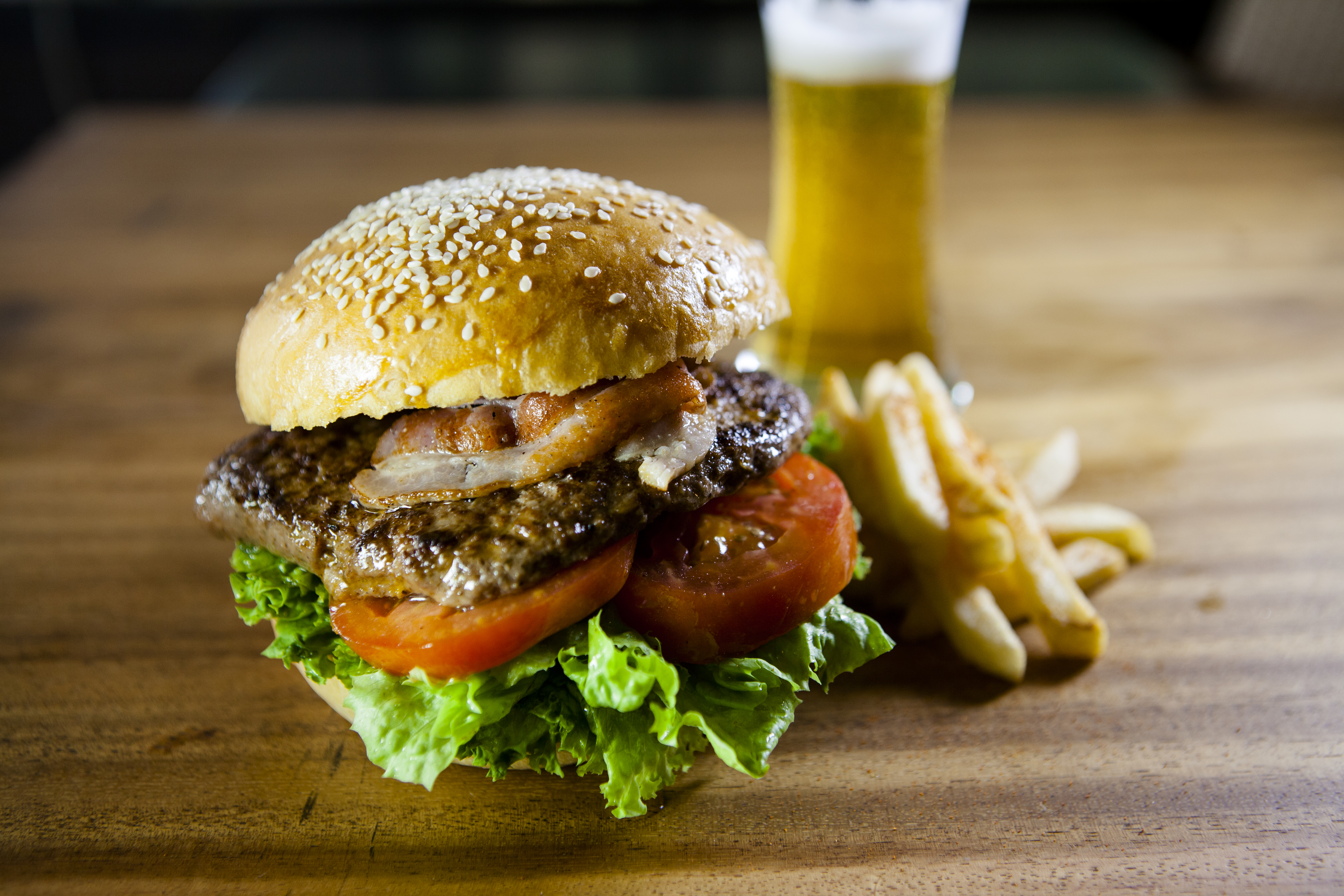
- A hamburger with bacon, lettuce, and slices of tomato, served with French fries and a beer
- Alternative names: Burger
- Course: Main course
- Place of origin: Germany or United States
- Created by: Multiple claims (see text)
- Serving temperature: Hot
- Main ingredients: Ground meat, bread

A hamburger, often known as a burger, consists of fillings—usually a patty of panfried or grilled ground meat, typically beef—placed inside a sliced bun, sesame seed bun, or bread roll. These patties are often served with lettuce, tomato, onion, pickles, bacon, or chilis, together in the bun or roll. The filling of the burger can be topped with condiments such as ketchup, mustard, mayonnaise, relish, or a "special sauce", often a variation of Thousand Island dressing. A burger with the patty topped with cheese is called a cheeseburger. Under some definitions, a hamburger is considered a sandwich.

Hamburgers are commonly prepared at home and typically associated with fast-food restaurants but are also sold at other restaurants, including high-end establishments. There are many international and regional variations of hamburgers. Some of the largest multinational fast-food chains feature burgers as one of their core products: McDonald's Big Mac and Burger King's Whopper have become global icons of American culture. Hamburgers are staples of fast food and are most commonly served with a side of French fries.

== Etymology and terminology ==
The term hamburger originally derives from Hamburg, Germany. However, it is contentious what the exact connection between the food item and the city is.

By linguistic rebracketing, the term "burger" eventually became a self-standing word that is associated with many different types of sandwiches that are similar to a hamburger, but contain different meats such as buffalo in the buffalo burger, venison, kangaroo, chicken, turkey, elk, lamb or fish such as salmon in the salmon burger, and even with meatless sandwiches as is the case of the veggie burger. The term burger can also be applied to a meat patty on its own. Since the term hamburger usually implies beef, for clarity burger may be prefixed with the type of meat or meat substitute used, as in beef burger, turkey burger, bison burger, or portobello burger.

== History ==
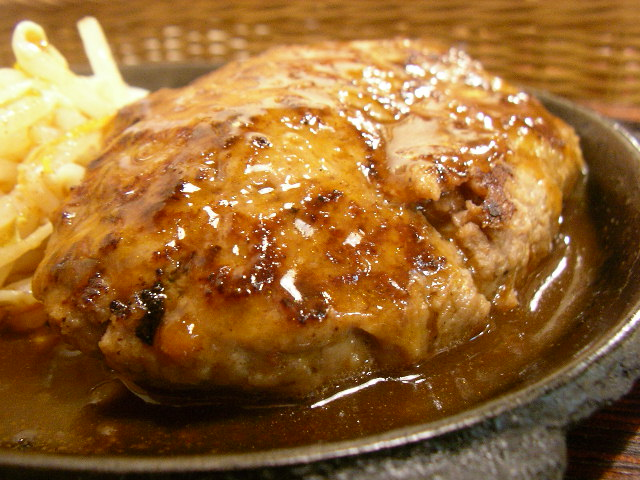
Hamburg steak has been known as "Frikadelle" in Germany since the 17th century.

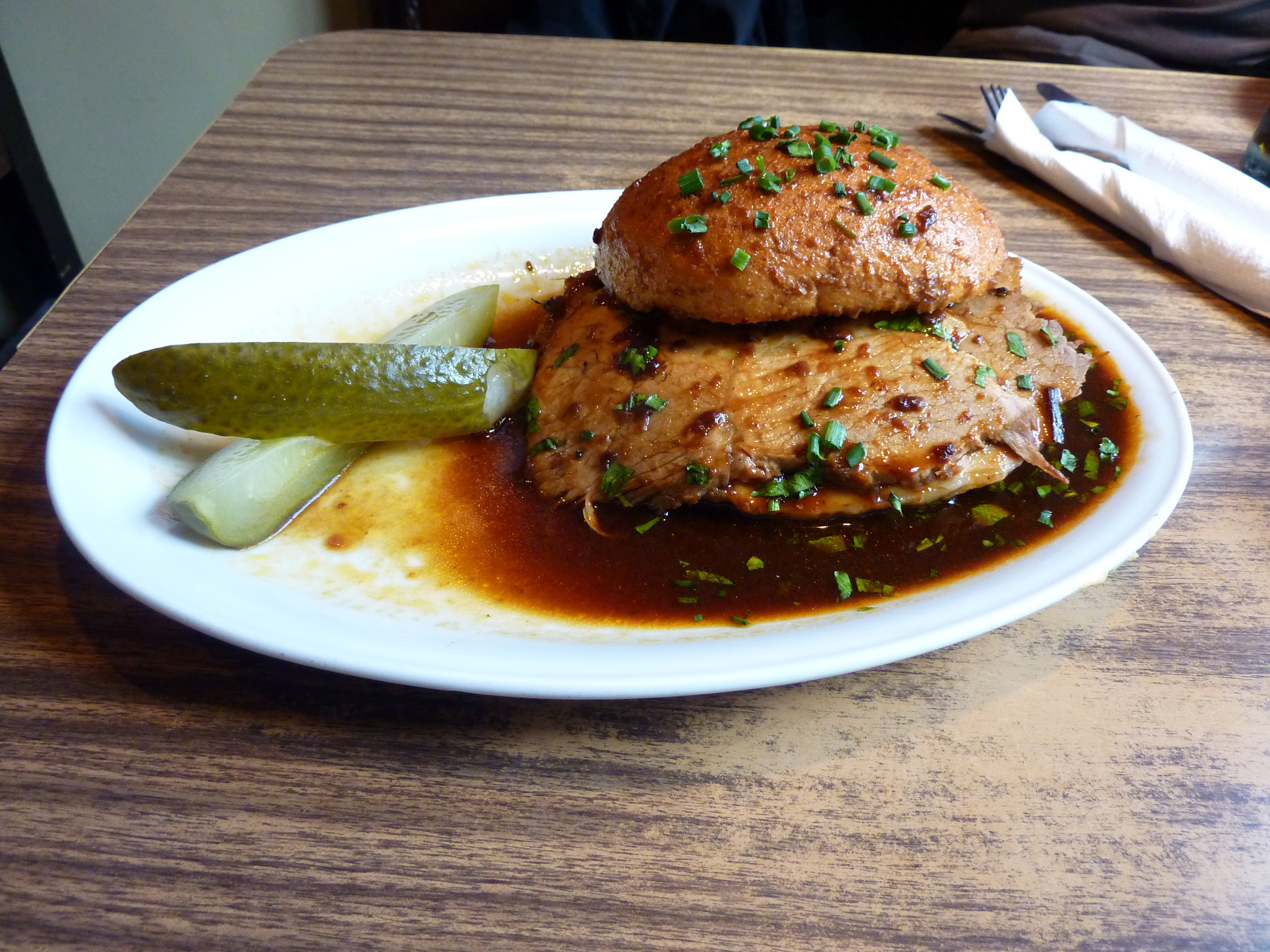
The "Hamburger Rundstück" was popular already in 1869 and is believed to be a precursor to the modern Hamburger.

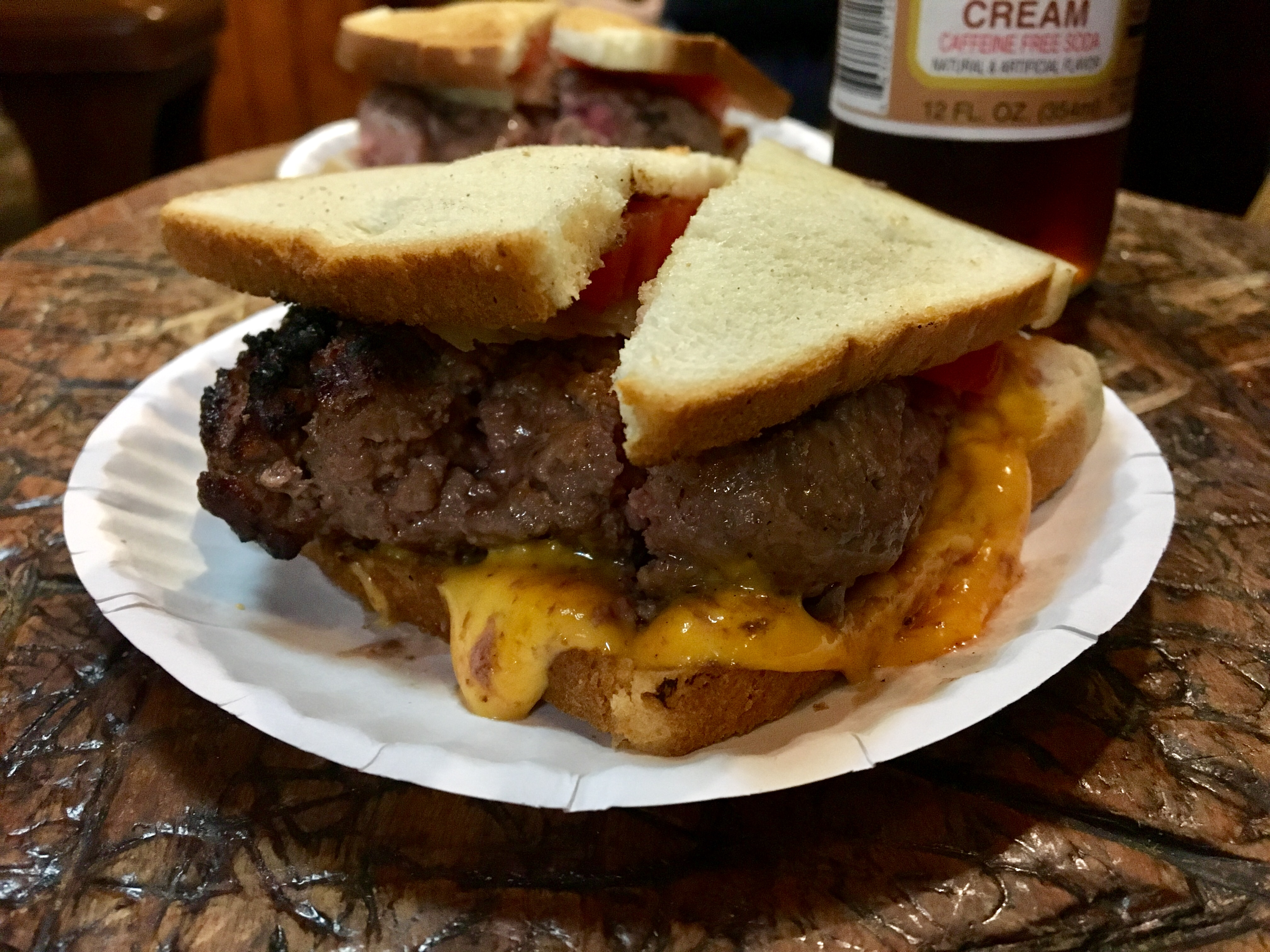
Cheeseburger (with onions and tomatoes) at Louis' Lunch, New Haven, Connecticut

Versions of the meal have been served for over a century, but its origins are still unclear. The 1758 edition of the book The Art of Cookery Made Plain and Easy by Hannah Glasse included a recipe called "Hamburgh sausage", suggesting that it should be served "roasted with toasted bread under it." A similar snack was also popular in Hamburg under the name of "Rundstück warm" ("bread roll warm") in 1869 or earlier, and was supposedly eaten by emigrants on their way to America. However, this may have contained roasted beefsteak rather than Frikadelle. It has alternatively been suggested that Hamburg steak served between two pieces of bread and eaten by Jewish passengers travelling from Hamburg to New York on Hamburg America Line vessels (which began operations in 1847) became so well known that the shipping company gave its name to the dish. It is not known which of these stories is the reason hamburgers got their name.

There is a reference to a "Hamburg steak" as early as 1884 in The Boston Journal.^{[OED, under "steak"]} On July 5, 1896, the Chicago Daily Tribune made a highly specific claim regarding a "hamburger sandwich" in an article about a "Sandwich Car": "A distinguished favorite, only five cents, is Hamburger steak sandwich, the meat for which is kept ready in small patties and 'cooked while you wait' on the gasoline range."

=== Claims of invention ===
"Hamburger steak sandwiches" have been advertised in U.S. newspapers from New York to Hawaii since at least the 1890s, but the inventor is unclear.

The invention of hamburgers is attributed to various people, including Charlie Nagreen, Frank and Charles Menches, Oscar Weber Bilby, Fletcher Davis, and Louis Lassen. White Castle traces the origin of the hamburger to Otto Krause in Hamburg, Germany. Some have pointed to a recipe for "Hamburgh sausages" on toasted bread, published in The Art of Cookery Made Plain and Easy by Hannah Glasse in 1758, as a notable first source of the dish.

Hamburgers gained national recognition in the U.S. at the 1904 St. Louis World's Fair when the New York Tribune referred to the hamburger as "the innovation of a food vendor on the pike." No conclusive argument has ended the dispute over invention. An article from ABC News sums up: "One problem is that there is little written history. Another issue is that the burger spread happened largely at the World's Fair, from tiny vendors that came and went instantly. And it is entirely possible that more than one person came up with the idea at the same time in different parts of the country."

==== Louis Lassen ====
The restaurant Louis' Lunch in New Haven, Connecticut, founded in 1895, has long claimed to be the "birthplace of the hamburger sandwich". Ostensibly, around 1900, Danish immigrant Louis Lassen found himself out of steaks when a customer ordered a quick hot meal. Taking ground beef trimmings, Louis made a patty and grilled it, putting it between two slices of toast. (Some critics, such as New York Magazine food editor Joshua Ozersky, claim that this sandwich was not a hamburger because the bread was toasted.) New York Magazine wrote in 1977 that, supposedly, "The dish actually had no name until some rowdy sailors from Hamburg named the meat on a bun after themselves years later". This origin story has been amplified by Connecticut Congresswoman Rosa DeLauro and the Library of Congress—notwithstanding earlier references to hamburgers elsewhere in the country.

==== Charlie Nagreen ====
One of the earliest claims of hamburger invention comes from Charlie Nagreen, who in 1885 sold a meatball between two slices of bread at the Seymour Fair now sometimes called the Outagamie County Fair. The Seymour Community Historical Society of Seymour, Wisconsin, credits Nagreen, also referred to as "Hamburger Charlie", with the invention. Nagreen was 15 when he reportedly sold pork sandwiches at the 1885 Seymour Fair so customers could eat while walking. The Historical Society explains that Nagreen named the hamburger after the Hamburg steak with which local German immigrants were familiar.

==== Otto Krause ====
According to White Castle, Otto Krause was the inventor of the hamburger. In 1891, he created a beef patty cooked in butter and topped with a fried egg. German sailors later omitted the fried egg.

==== Oscar Weber Bilby ====
The family of Oscar Weber Bilby claims the first-known hamburger on a bun was served on July 4, 1891, on Grandpa Oscar's farm. The bun was a yeast bun. In 1995, Governor Frank Keating proclaimed that the first true hamburger on a bun was created and consumed in Tulsa, Oklahoma in 1891, calling Tulsa "The Real Birthplace of the Hamburger".

==== Frank and Charles Menches ====
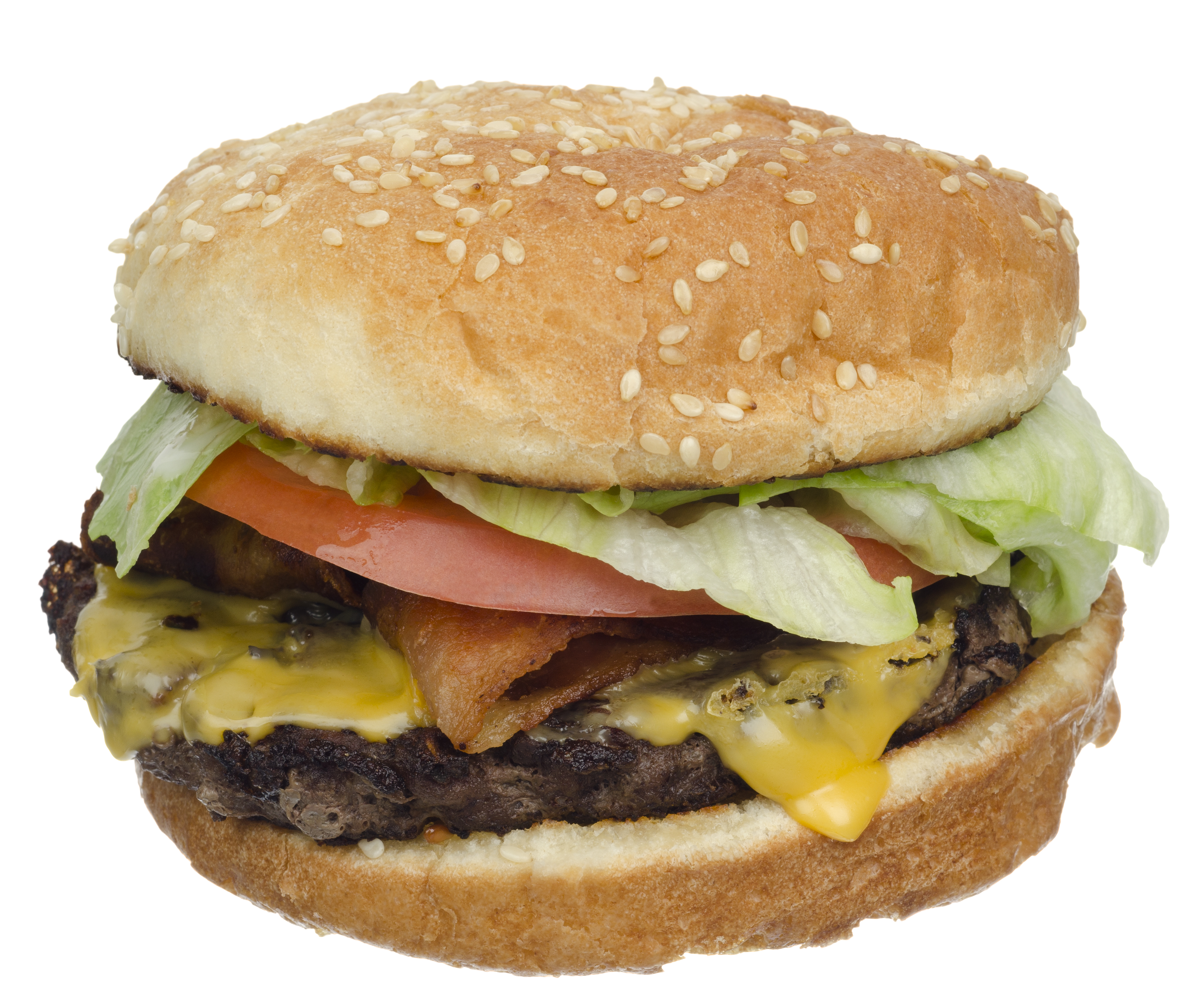
A bacon cheeseburger from a New York City diner

Frank and Charles Menches claim to have sold a ground beef sandwich at the Erie County Fair in 1885 in Hamburg, New York. During the fair, they ran out of pork sausage for their sandwiches and substituted beef. The brothers exhausted their supply of sausage, so they purchased chopped-up beef from a butcher, Andrew Klein. Historian Joseph Streamer wrote that the meat was from Stein's market, not Klein's, despite Stein's having sold the market in 1874. The story notes that, in this case, the name of the hamburger comes from Hamburg, New York, not Hamburg, Germany. Frank Menches's obituary in The New York Times states that these events took place at the 1892 Summit County Fair in Akron, Ohio.

==== Fletcher Davis ====
Fletcher Davis of Athens, Texas, claimed to have invented the hamburger. According to oral histories, he opened a lunch counter in Athens in the 1880s and served a 'burger' of fried ground beef patties with mustard and Bermuda onion between two slices of bread, with a pickle on the side. The story is that in 1904, Davis and his wife Ciddy ran a sandwich stand at the St. Louis World's Fair. Historian Frank X. Tolbert noted that Athens resident Clint Murchison said his grandfather dated the hamburger to the 1880s with Fletcher "Old Dave" Davis. A photo of "Old Dave's Hamburger Stand" from 1904 was sent to Tolbert as evidence of the claim.

==== Other hamburger-steak claims ====
Various claims of the invention relate to the term "hamburger steak" without mention of its being a sandwich. The alleged first printed American menu listing hamburgers is an 1834 menu from Delmonico's in New York. However, the printer of the original menu was not yet in business in 1834. In 1889, a menu from Walla Walla Union in Washington offered hamburger steak as a menu item.

Between 1871 and 1884, "Hamburg Beefsteak" was on the "Breakfast and Supper Menu" of the Clipper Restaurant at 311/313 Pacific Street in San Fernando, California. It cost 10 cents—the same price as mutton chops, pig's feet in batter, and stewed veal. It was not, however, on the dinner menu. Only "Pig's Head", "Calf Tongue", and "Stewed Kidneys" were listed. Another claim ties the hamburger to Summit County, in New York or Ohio. Summit County, Ohio, exists, but Summit County, New York, does not.

=== Early major vendors ===
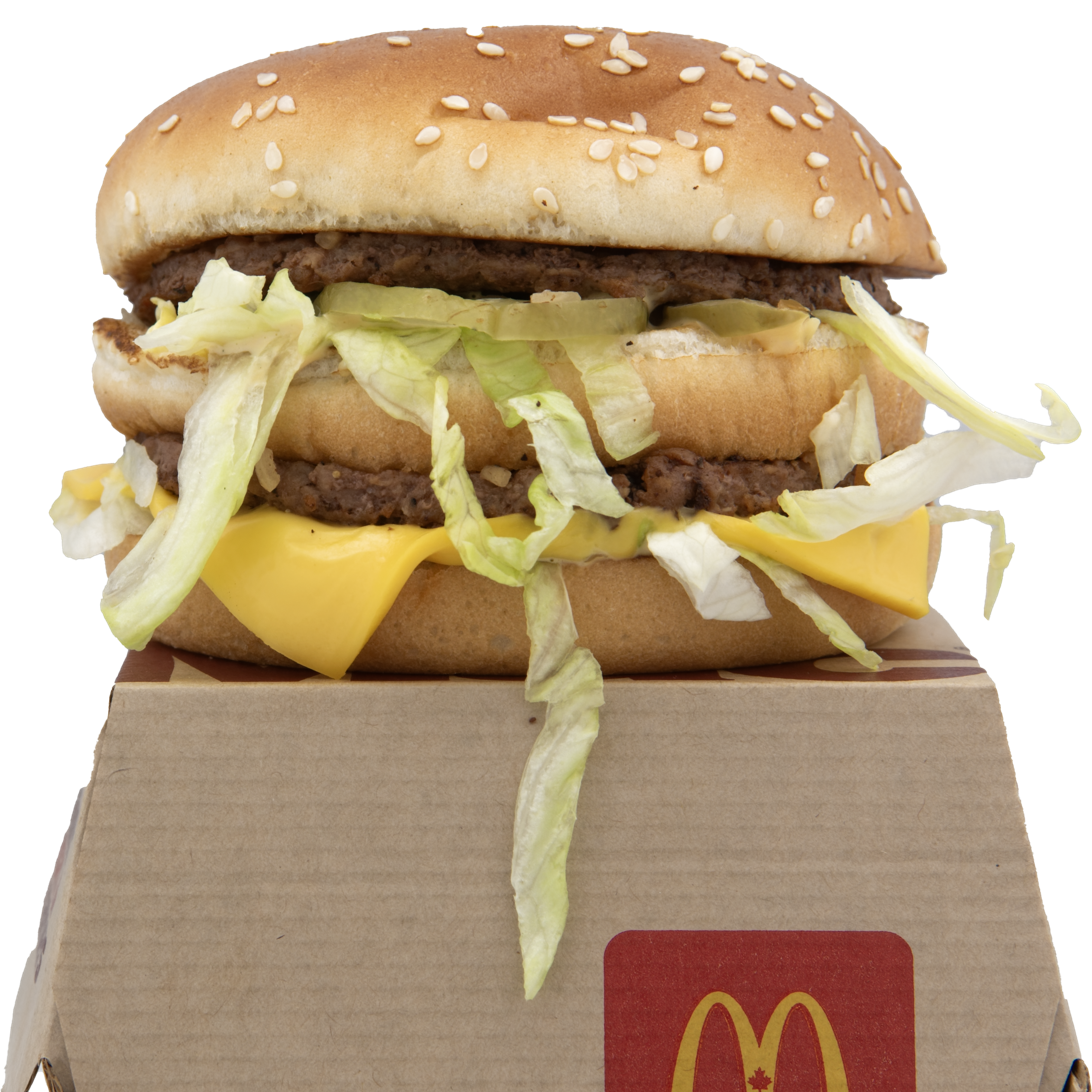
McDonald's Big Mac

- 1921: White Castle, Wichita, Kansas. Due to books by Upton Sinclair and Arthur Kallet discrediting the cleanliness and nutritional value of ground beef, hamburger meat was unpopular with families until the White Castle restaurant chain took it upon themselves to market the cleanliness and quality of their food through scientific studies by preparing the food in full view of customers. The Company also reported in local newspapers how they carefully selected their meat, and opened the "Food Experiment Department" as a test kitchen and quality-control laboratory. White Castle marketed and sold large numbers of small 65 mm (2 1/2 in) square hamburger sandwiches, known as sliders, and created five holes in each patty, which helped them cook evenly and eliminated the need to flip the burger. In 1995, White Castle began selling frozen hamburgers in convenience stores and vending machines.
- 1923: Kewpee Hamburgers, or Kewpee Hotels, Flint, Michigan. Kewpee was the second established hamburger chain and peaked at 400 locations before World War II. Many of these locations were licensed but not strictly franchised, and many closed during WWII. Between 1955 and 1967, another wave of Kewpee Hamburgers restaurants closed or changed names. In 1967, the Kewpee licensor moved the company to a franchise system. As of 2025, there are only five locations remaining.
- 1926: White Tower Hamburgers
- 1927: Little Tavern
- 1932: Krystal
- 1936: Big Boy. In 1937, Bob Wian created the double-decker hamburger at his stand in Glendale, California. Big Boy became the name of the hamburger, mascot, and restaurant. Big Boy expanded nationally through regional franchising and subfranchising. Primarily operating as drive-in restaurants in the 1950s, interior dining gradually replaced curb service by the early 1970s. Many franchises have closed or switched to being operated independently, but the Big Boy double-decker hamburger remains the signature item at the remaining American Big Boy restaurants.
- 1940: McDonald's restaurant, San Bernardino, California, was opened by Richard and Maurice McDonald. Their introduction of the "Speedee Service System" in 1948 established the principles of the modern fast-food restaurant. The McDonald brothers began franchising in 1953. In 1961, Ray Kroc (the supplier of their multi-mixer milkshake machines) purchased the company from the brothers for $2.7 million and a 1.9% royalty.

== Variations ==
=== Other meats ===
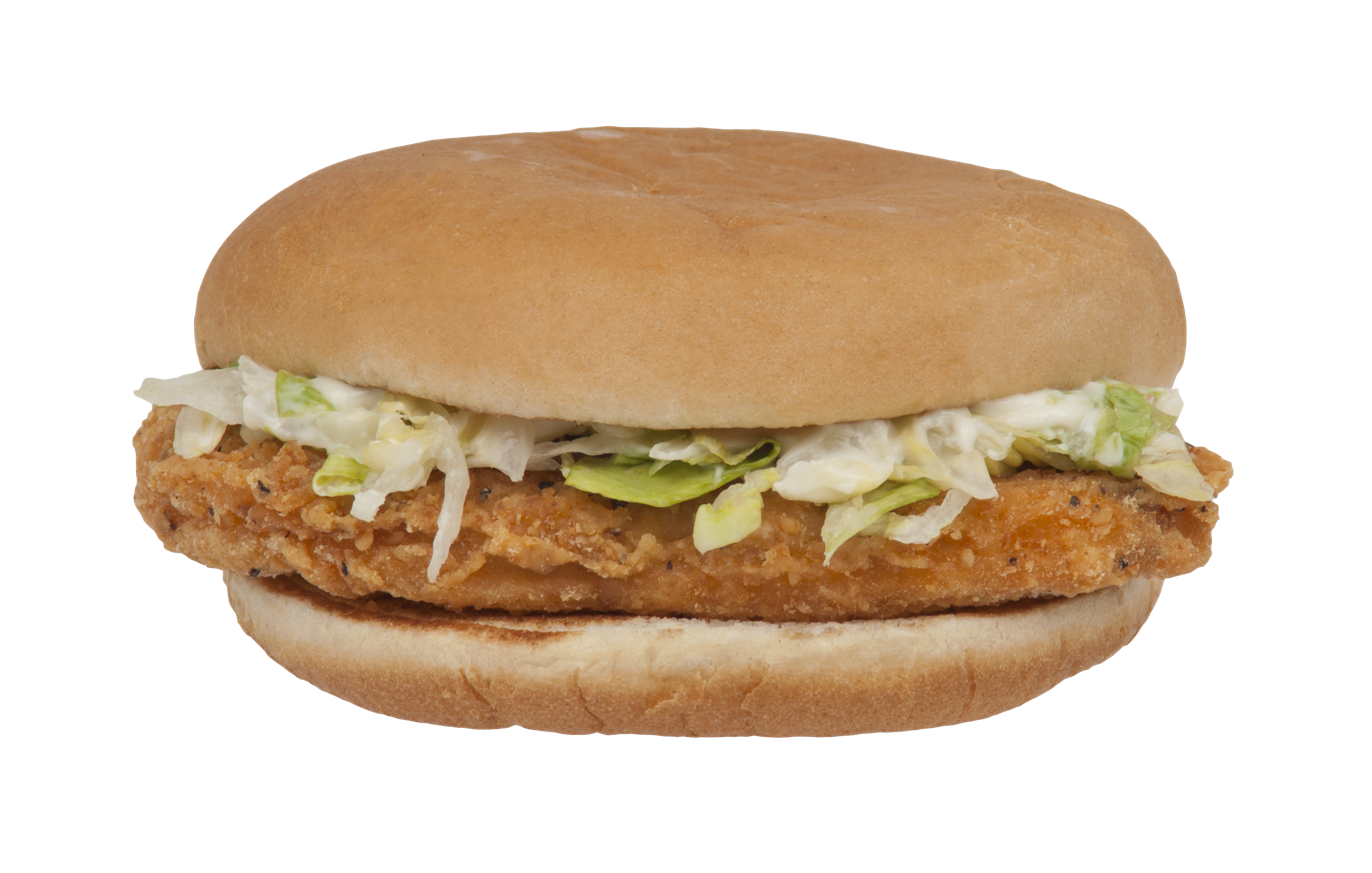
McChicken chicken burger

Burgers can also be made with meat other than beef. Examples include:

- Turkey burger
- Chicken burger:
  - Ground chicken meat
  - Chicken breast (marinated or not)
  - Fried chicken
- Buffalo burger
- Venison burger
- Lamb burger
- Veal burger
- Fish burger

=== Veggie burgers ===
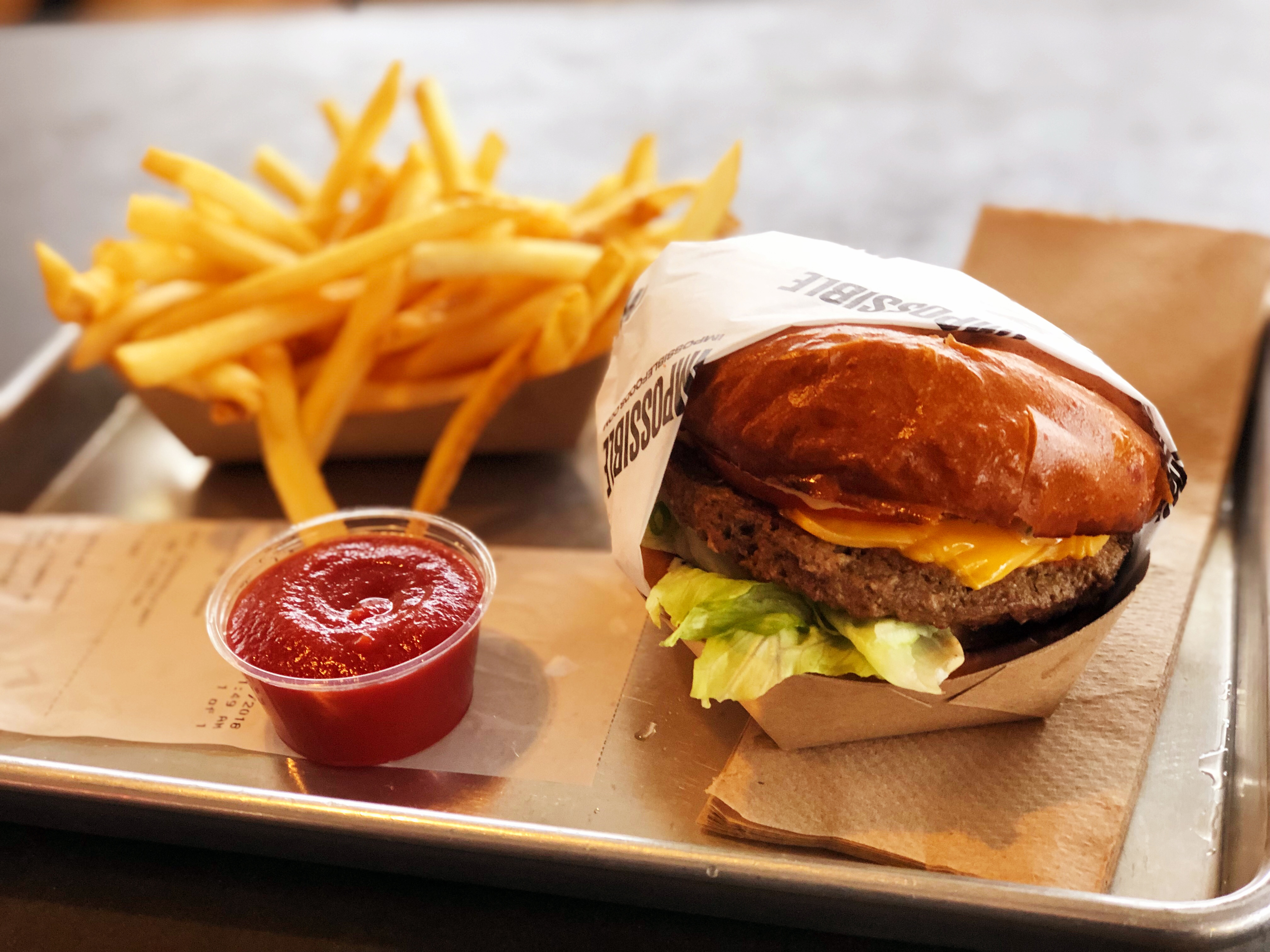
The vegan Impossible Burger

Vegetarian and vegan burgers can be formed from a meat analogue. These may include, when formed into patties, tofu, TVP, seitan (wheat gluten), beans, grains, or an assortment of vegetables.

John Harvey Kellogg developed a peanut-based meat substitute which he called Nuttose in the 1890s. In the 1960s and 1970s, some companies began making soy-based burgers, including Loma Linda, Boca Burger and Lightlife. Other producers entered business with new burgers in the 2000s, including Gardein, Impossible Foods and Beyond Meat. These products are primarily made of peas, soy, mushrooms, yeast, beans or nuts.

== By country ==
=== Australia and New Zealand ===
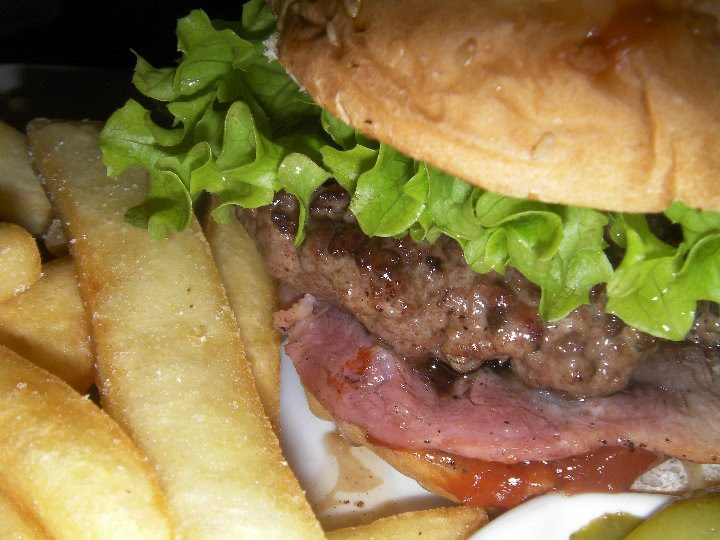
This hamburger in a fast food restaurant in Auckland, New Zealand, contains beetroot for flavor.

Fast food franchises sell American-style fast-food hamburgers in Australia and New Zealand. The traditional Australasian hamburgers are usually bought from fish and chip shops or milk bars rather than from chain restaurants. These traditional hamburgers are becoming less common as older-style fast food outlets decrease in number. The hamburger meat is almost always ground beef, or "mince", as it is more commonly referred to in Australia and New Zealand. They often include sliced tomato, lettuce, grilled onion, and meat, at least, and usually sliced beetroot. This is known in Australia as a "plain hamburger", but a hamburger may also include cheese, pineapple, a fried egg, and bacon, as optional ingredients. If all these optional ingredients are included, it is known in Australia as a "burger with the lot".

In Australia and New Zealand, as in the United Kingdom, the word sandwich is generally reserved for two slices of bread (from a loaf) with fillings in between them. This is unlike in American English where a sandwich is fillings between two pieces of any kind of bread, not only slices of bread. As such, in Australia and New Zealand, burgers are not generally considered to be sandwiches.

The term burger is applied to any cut bun with a hot filling, even when the filling does not contain beef, such as a chicken burger (generally with chicken breast rather than chicken mince), salmon burger, pulled pork burger, veggie burger, etc.

The only variance between the two countries' hamburgers is that New Zealand's equivalent to "The Lot" often contains a steak (beef). The condiments regularly used are barbecue sauce and tomato sauce. The traditional Australasian hamburger never includes mayonnaise. The McDonald's "McOz" Burger is partway between American and Australian style burgers, having beetroot and tomato in an otherwise typical American burger; however, it is no longer a part of the menu. Likewise, McDonald's in New Zealand created a Kiwiburger, similar to a Quarter Pounder, but including salad, beetroot, and a fried egg. The Hungry Jack's (Burger King) "Aussie Burger" has tomato, lettuce, onion, cheese, bacon, beetroot, egg, ketchup, and a meat patty, while adding pineapple is an upcharge. It is essentially a "Burger with the lot" but uses the standard Hungry Jack's circular breakfast egg rather than the fully fried egg used by local fish shops.

=== Belgium and Netherlands ===
Throughout Belgium and in some eateries in the Netherlands, a Bicky Burger is sold that combines pork, chicken, and horse meat. The hamburger, usually fried, is served between a bun, sprinkled with sesame seeds. It often comes with a specific Bickysaus (Bicky dressing) made with mayonnaise, mustard, cabbage, and onion.

=== China ===
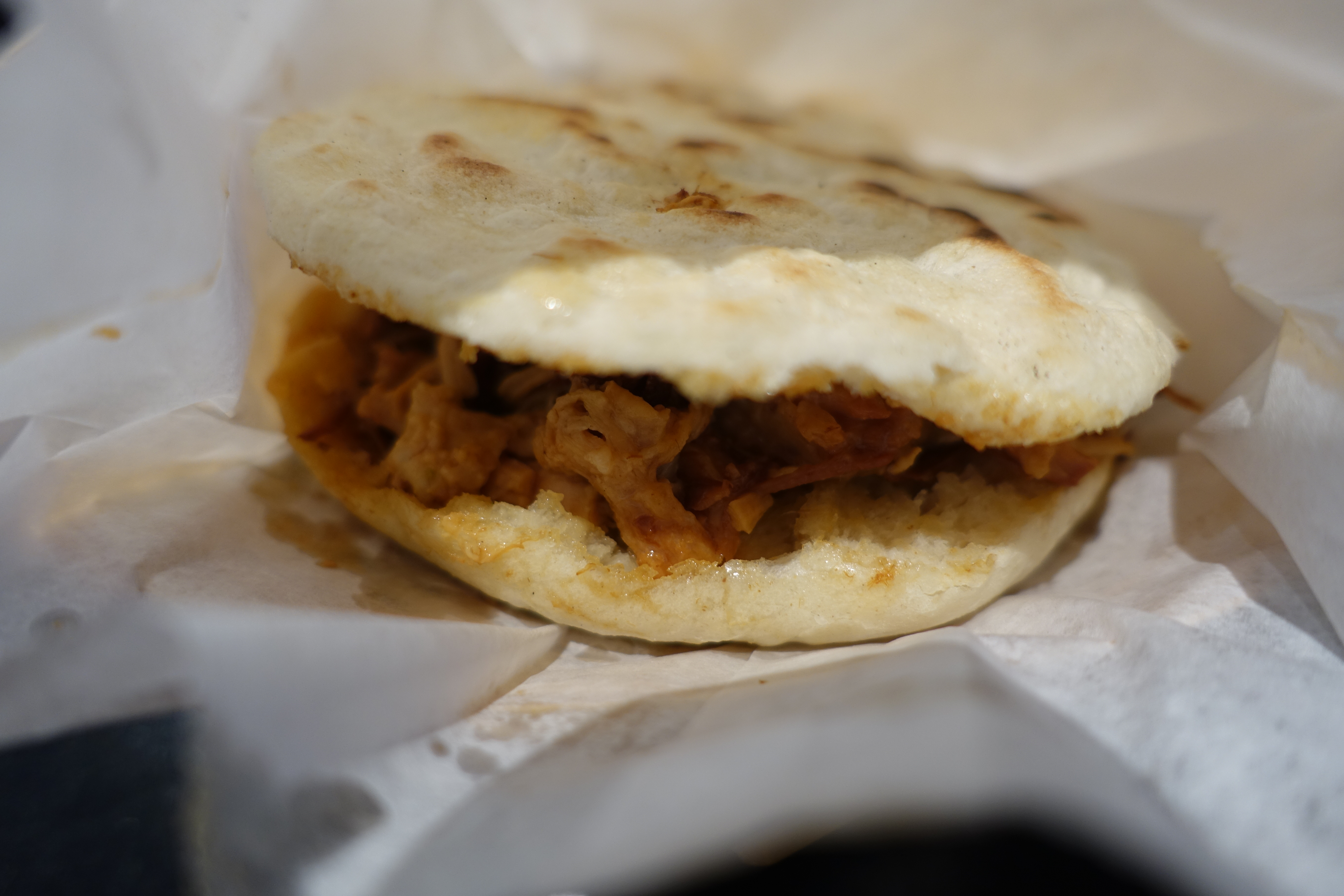
Roujiamo, the "Chinese hamburger"

In China, due to the branding of their sandwiches by McDonald's and KFC restaurants in China, the word "burger" (汉堡) refers to all sandwiches that consist of two pieces of bun and a meat patty in between.

A popular Chinese street food, known as roujiamo (肉夹馍), consists of meat (most commonly pork) sandwiched between two buns. Roujiamo has been called the "Chinese hamburger". Since the sandwich dates back to the Qin dynasty (221–206 BC) and fits the aforementioned Chinese word for burger, Chinese media have claimed that the hamburger was invented in China.

=== Denmark ===
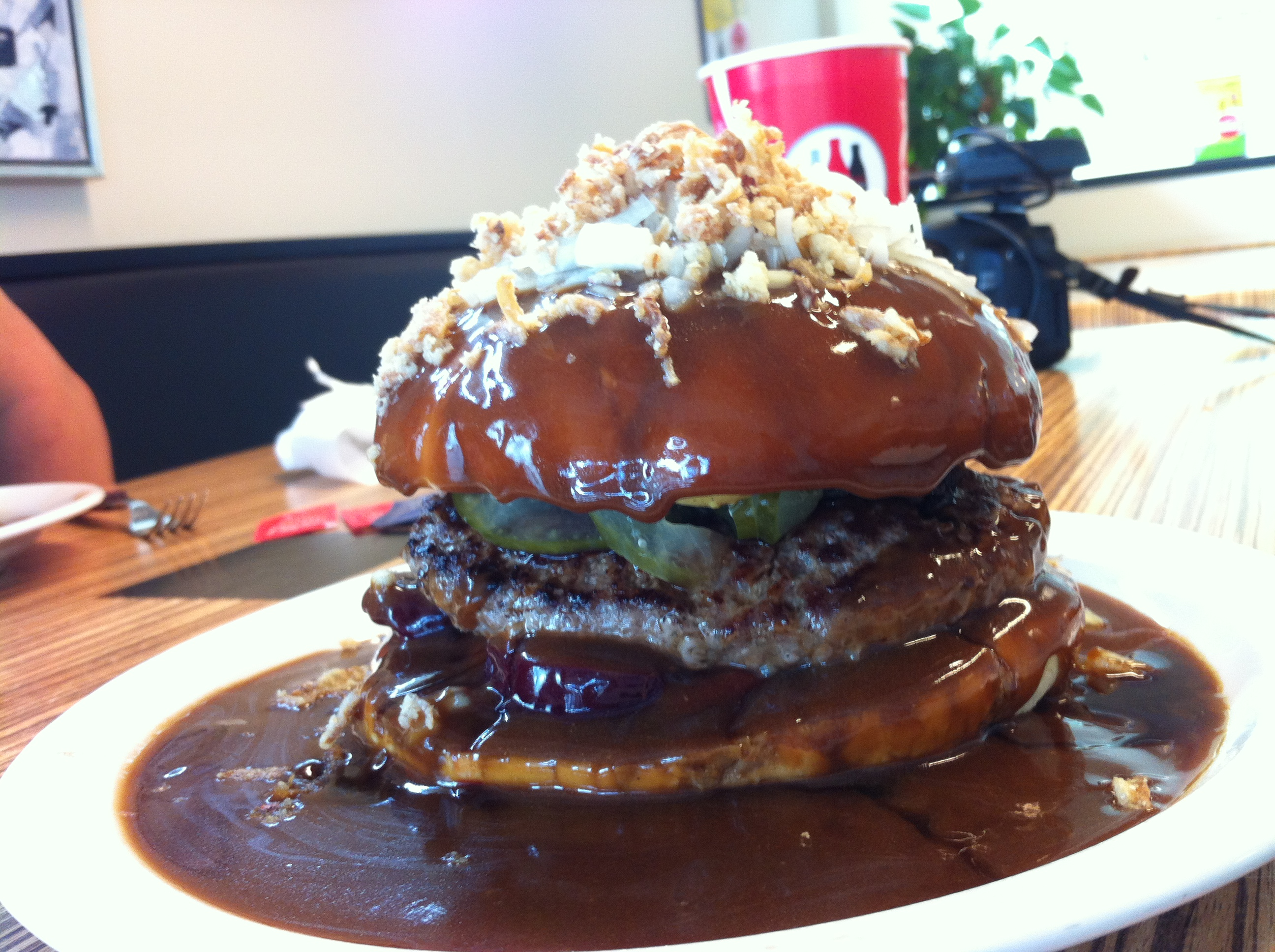
The modern Danish bøfsandwich

In Denmark, the hamburger was introduced in 1949, though it was called the bøfsandwich. There are many variations. While the original bøfsandwich was simply a generic meat patty containing a mix of beef and horse meat, with slightly different garnish (mustard, ketchup, and soft onions), it has continued to evolve. Today, a bøfsandwich usually contains a beef patty; pickled cucumber; raw, pickled, fried, or soft onions; pickled red beets; mustard; ketchup; remoulade; and is often overflowing with brown gravy, which is sometimes even poured on top of the assembled bøfsandwich. The original bøfsandwich is still on the menu at the same restaurant from which it originated in 1949, now run by the original owner's grandson.

Following the popularity of the bøfsandwich, many variations sprung up, using different types of meat instead of the beef patty. One variation, the flæskestegssandwich, grew especially popular. This variation replaces the minced beef patty with slices of pork loin or belly and typically uses sweet-and-sour pickled red cabbage, mayonnaise, mustard, and pork rinds as garnish.

Today, the bøfsandwich, flæskestegssandwich, and their many variations co-exist with the more typical hamburger, with the opening of the first Burger King restaurant in 1977 popularizing the United States dish in Denmark. Many local, high-end burger restaurants dot the major cities, including Popl, an offshoot of Noma.

=== East Asia ===
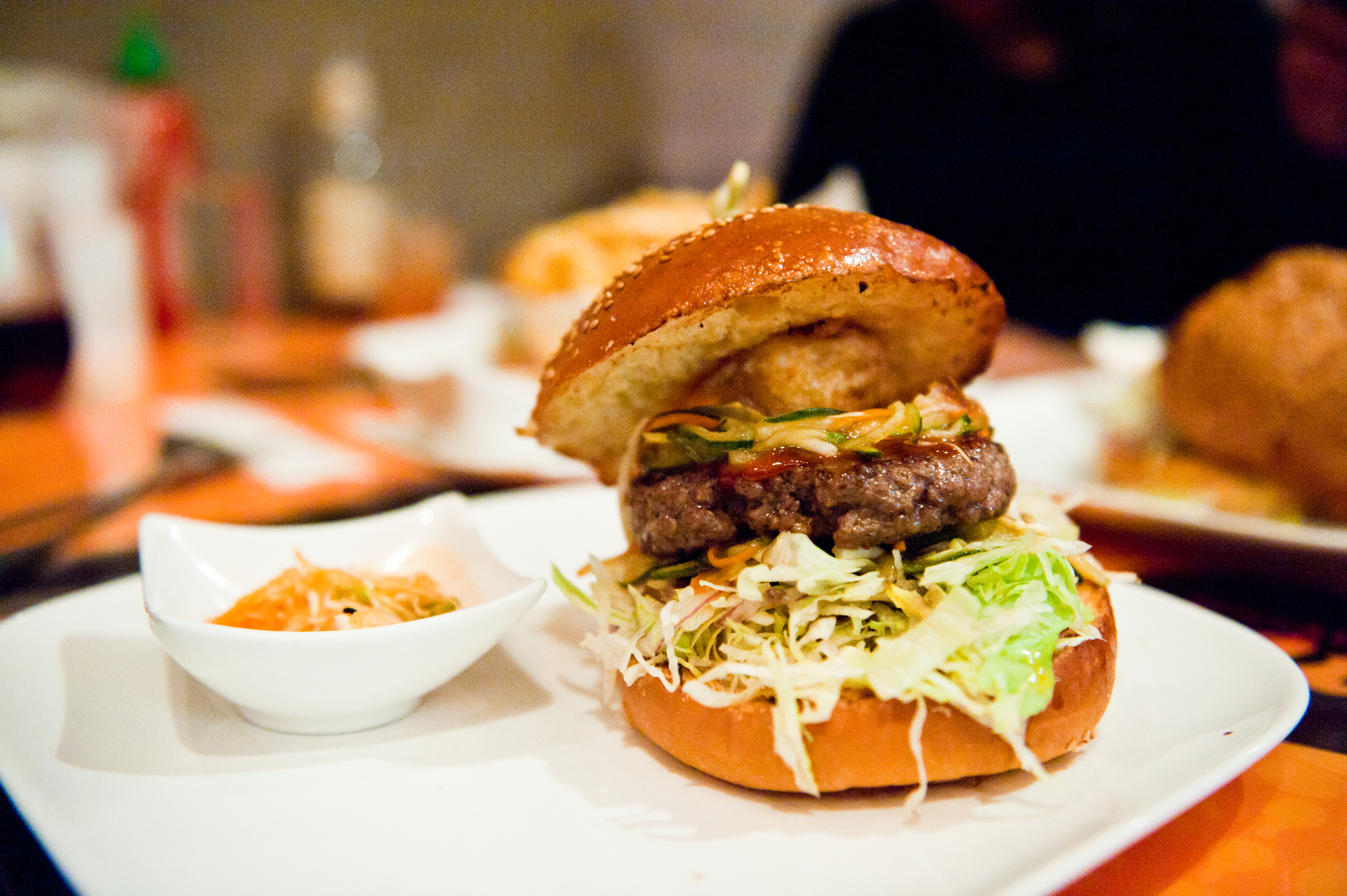
Korean-style bulgogi burger

Rice burgers mentioned above are also available in several East Asian countries such as Taiwan and South Korea. Lotteria is a prominent hamburger franchise in Japan owned by the South Korean Lotte group, with outlets also in China, South Korea, Vietnam, and Taiwan. In addition to selling beef hamburgers, they have hamburgers made from squid, pork, tofu, and shrimp. Variations available in South Korea include Bulgogi burgers and Kimchi burgers.

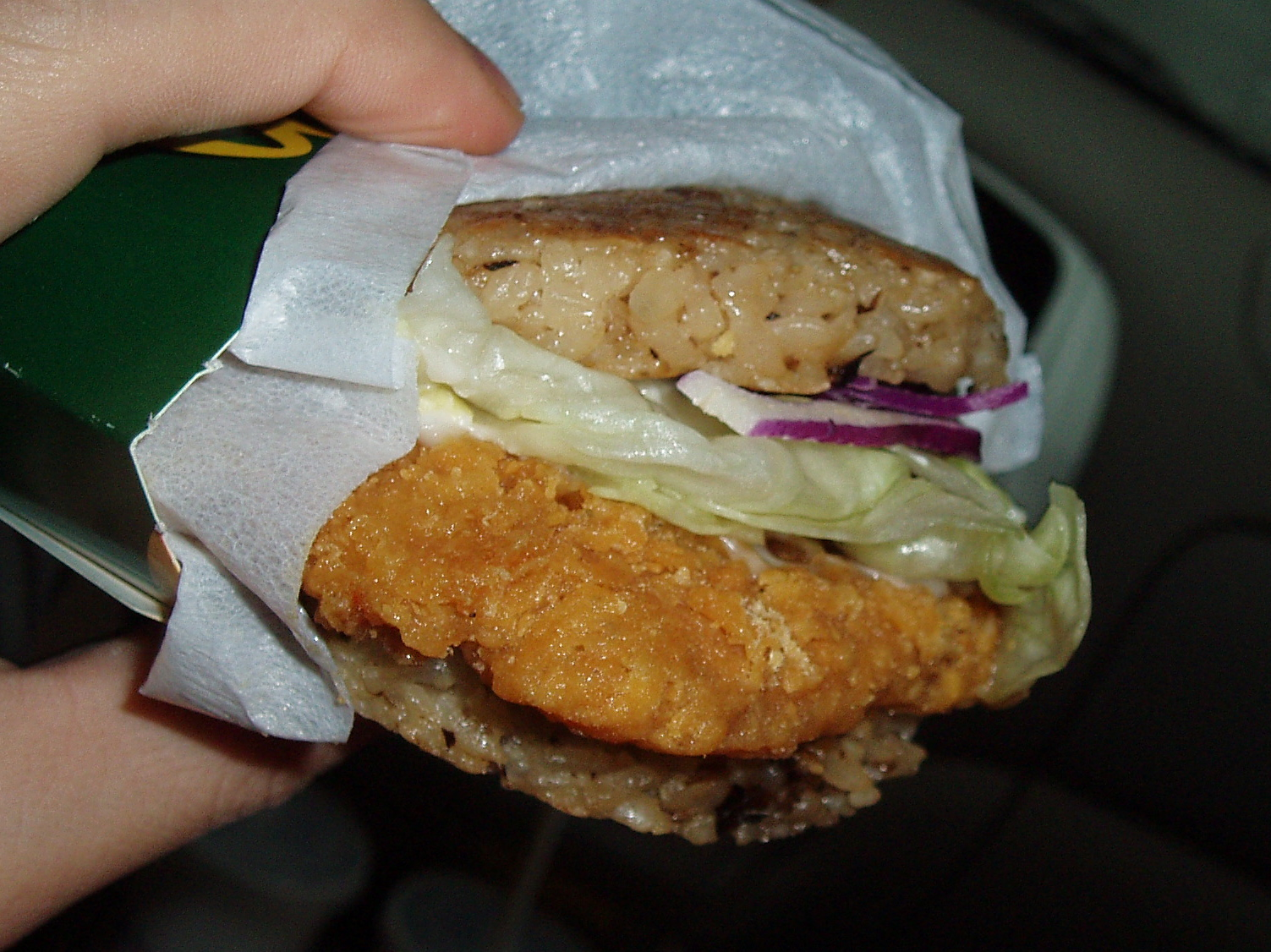
Chicken burger with rice bun (sold in Taiwan, Korea, Hong Kong, Macao, the Philippines, Thailand and Singapore). Note that the "bun" is composed of cooked rice.

In the Philippines, a wide range of major U.S. fast-food franchises are well represented, together with local imitators, often amended to the local palate. The chain McDonald's (locally nicknamed "McDo") has a range of burger and chicken dishes often accompanied by plain steamed rice, or French fries. The Philippines boasts its own burger chain called Jollibee, which offers burger meals and chicken, including a signature burger called "Champ". Jollibee now has several outlets in the United States, the SWANA region, and East Asia.

=== France ===
In 2012, according to a study by the NDP cabinet, the French consume 14 hamburgers in restaurants per year per person, placing them fourth in the world and second in Europe, just behind the British. A popular burger chain in France is Quick.

According to a study by Gira Conseil on the consumption of hamburgers in France in 2013, 75% of traditional French restaurants offer at least one hamburger on their menu, and for a third of these restaurants, it has become the leader in the range of dishes, ahead of rib steaks, grills, or fish.

=== India ===
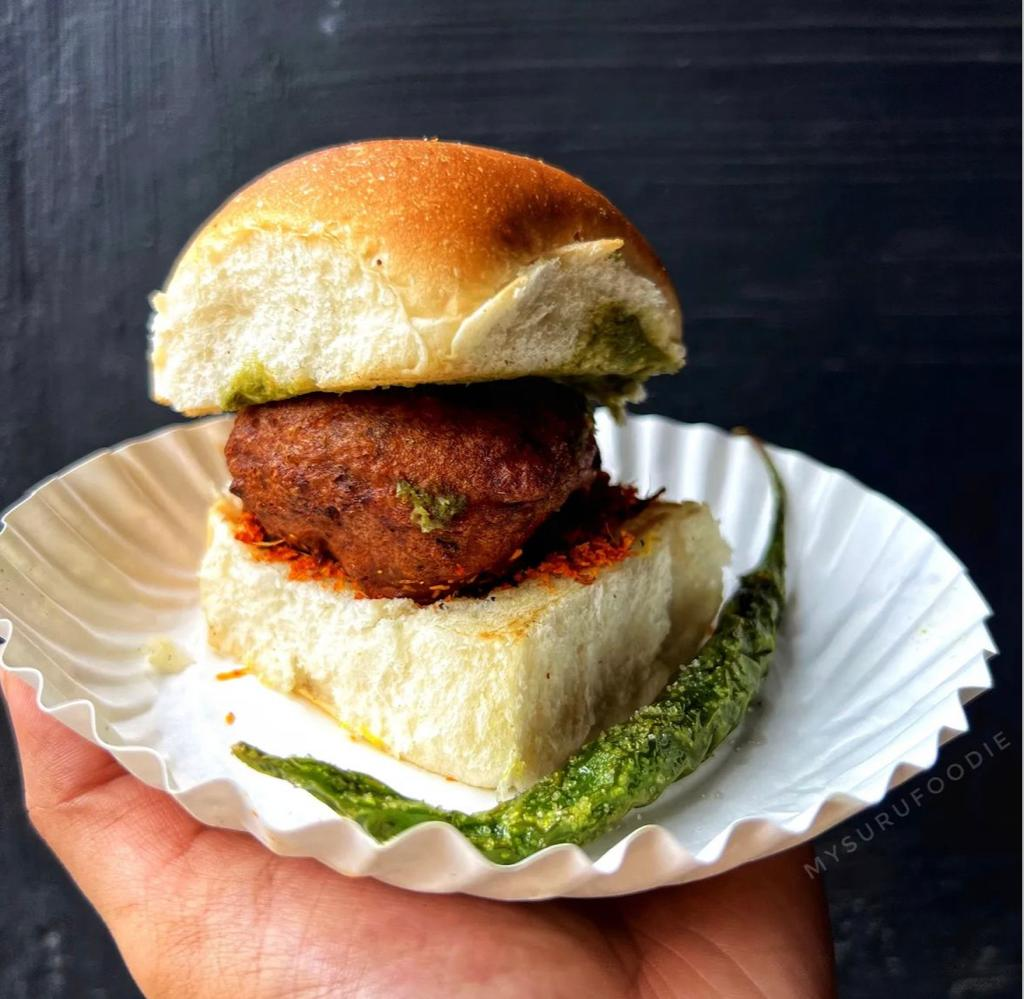
Vada pav or "Bombay Burger" is made of potatoes and spices.

In India, where there are cultural beliefs against eating beef (which stem from Hindu religious practice) and pork (which stems from Islamic religious practice), the term burger refers to a variety of sandwiches usually made from chicken or vegetable patties. Accordingly, most fast food chains and restaurants in India do not serve beef. McDonald's in India offers the "Maharaja Mac" instead of the Big Mac, substituting the beef patties with chicken.

The vada pav, consisting of a deep-fried potato patty dipped in gram flour batter, is sometimes called the Bombay burger.

=== Japan ===
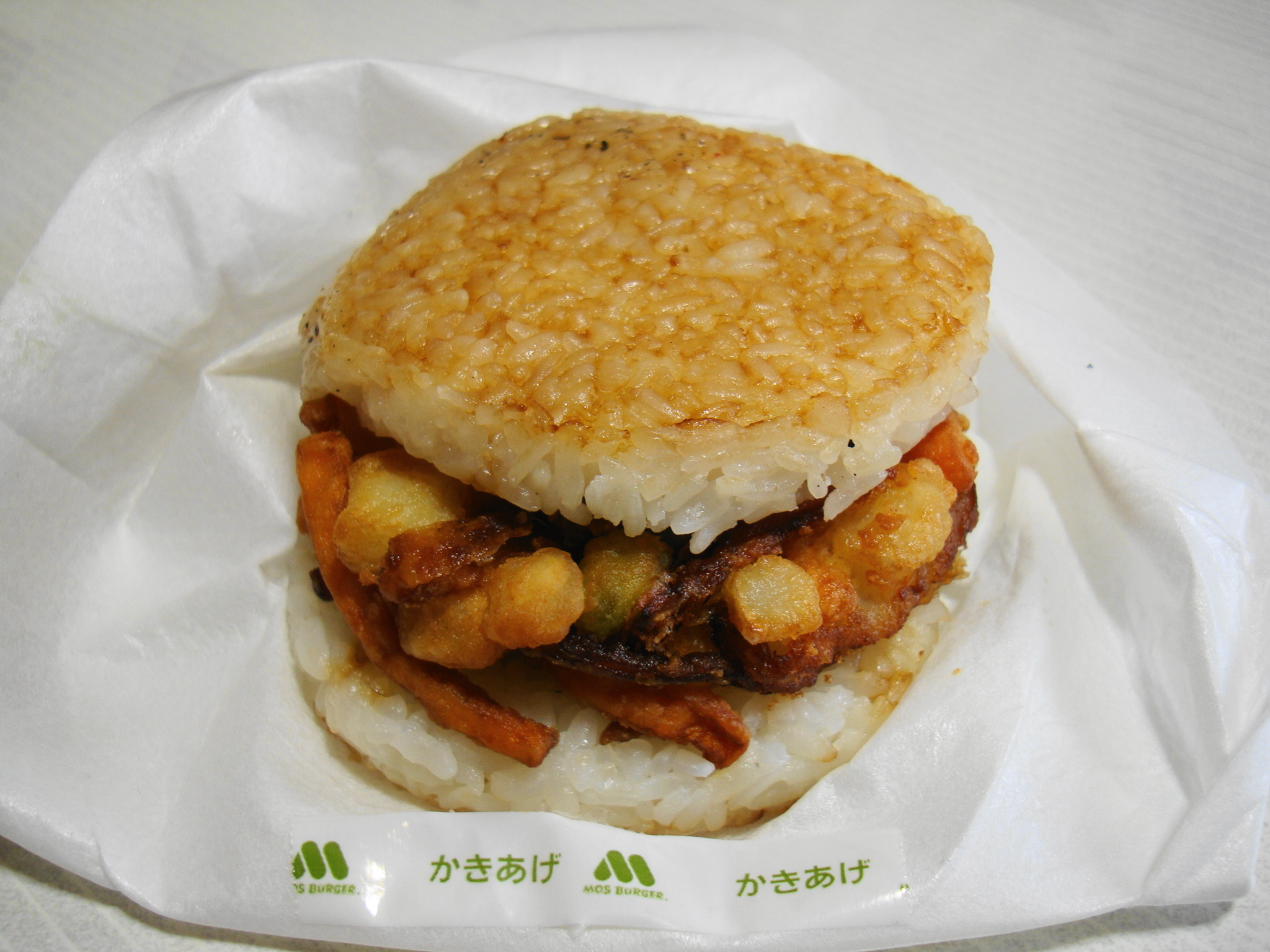
MOS Burger rice burger

In Japan, hamburgers can be served in a bun, called hanbāgā (ハンバーガー), or without a bun, which is known as hanbāgu (ハンバーグ) or "hamburg", short for "hamburg steak".

Hamburg steaks (served without buns) are similar to what are known as Salisbury steaks in the US. They are made from minced beef, pork, or a blend of the two mixed with minced onions, eggs, breadcrumbs, and spices. They are served with brown sauce (or demi-glace in restaurants) with vegetable or salad sides, or occasionally in Japanese curries. Hamburgers may be served in casual, Western-style suburban restaurant chains known in Japan as "family restaurants".

Hamburgers with buns are predominantly the domain of fast food chains. Japan has homegrown hamburger chain restaurants such as MOS Burger, First Kitchen, and Freshness Burger. Local varieties of burgers served in Japan include teriyaki burgers, katsu burgers (containing tonkatsu) and burgers containing shrimp korokke. Some of the more unusual examples include the rice burger, where the bun is made of rice, and the luxury 1,000-yen (US$10) "Takumi Burger" (meaning "artisan taste"), featuring avocados, freshly grated wasabi, and other rare seasonal ingredients. In terms of the actual patty, there are burgers made with Kobe beef, butchered from cows that are fed with beer and massaged daily. McDonald's Japan also recently in 2021 launched a McPork burger made with US pork. McDonald's has been gradually losing market share in Japan to these local hamburger chains due partly to the preference of Japanese diners for fresh ingredients and more refined, "upscale" hamburger offerings.

=== Malaysia ===
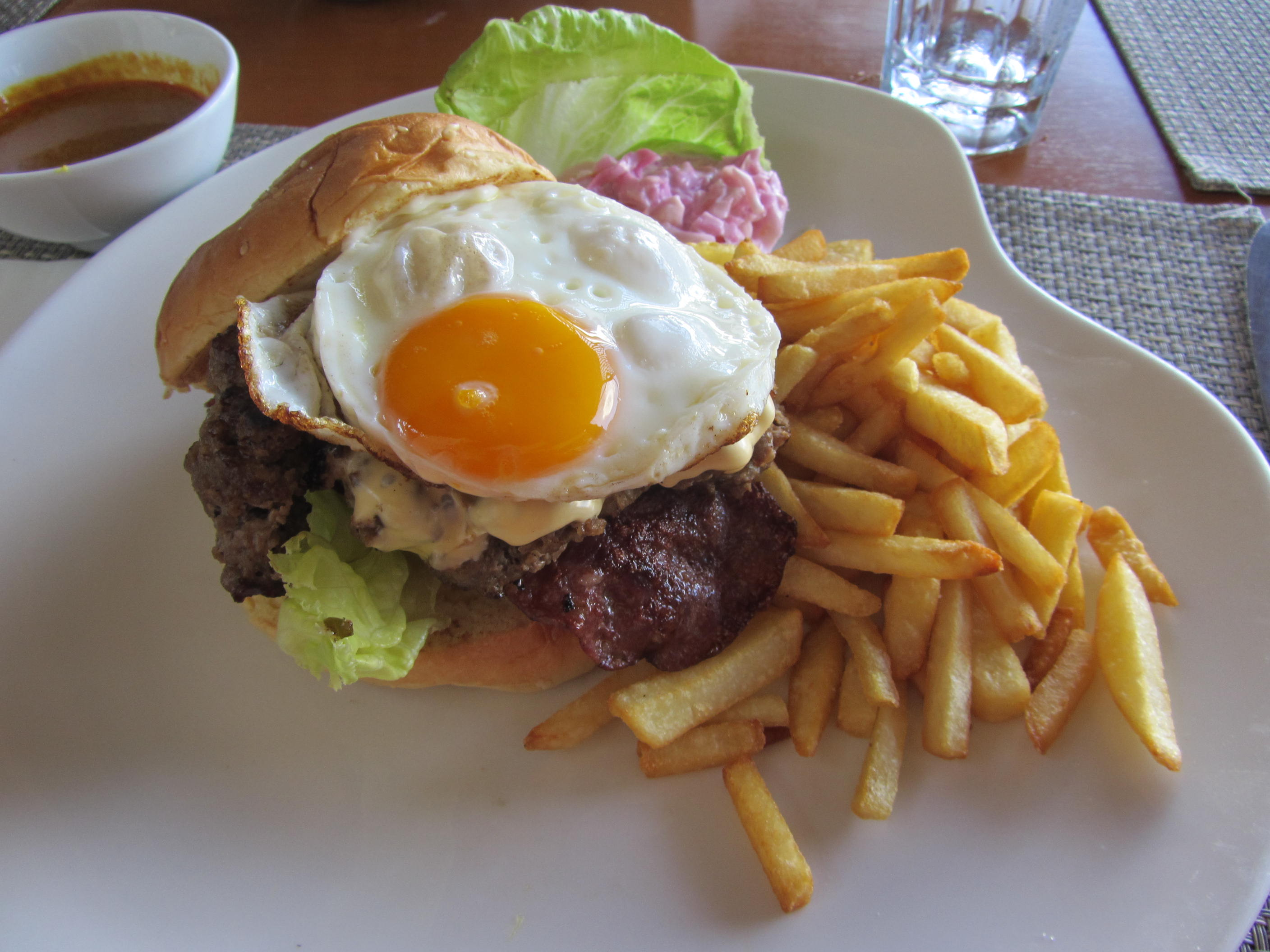
Beef burger with fried egg, cabbage and some french fries in Kota Kinabalu, Malaysia

Fast-food burger restaurants in Malaysia typically sell eggs and fried chicken in addition to U.S.-style burgers. A popular local brand is Ramly Burger, which combines a standard hamburger with an omelette.

=== Mexico ===
In Mexico, burgers (called hamburguesas) are served with ham and slices of American cheese fried on top of the meat patty. The toppings include avocado, jalapeño slices, shredded lettuce, onion, and tomato. The bun has mayonnaise, ketchup, and mustard. Bacon may also be added, which can be fried or grilled along with the meat patty. A slice of pineapple may be added to a hamburger for a "Hawaiian hamburger".

Some restaurants' burgers also have barbecue sauce, and others replace the ground patty with sirloin, Al pastor meat, barbacoa, or fried chicken breast. Many burger chains from the United States can be found in Mexico, including Carl's Jr., Sonic, McDonald's, and Burger King.

=== Mongolia ===
In Mongolia, a recent surge in popularity of fast food due to the sudden influx of foreign influence has led to increasing prominence of the hamburger. Specialized fast food restaurants serving to Mongolian tastes have sprung up and seen great success.

=== Pakistan ===
In Pakistan, apart from in American fast food chains, burgers can be found in stalls near shopping areas. The best known is the "shami burger". This is made from "shami kebab", made by mixing lentils and minced lamb.

=== Turkey ===
In Turkey, in addition to the internationally familiar offerings, numerous localized variants of the hamburger may be found, such as the Islak Burger (lit. 'Wet-Burger'), which is a beef slider doused in seasoned tomato sauce and steamed inside a special glass chamber, and has its origins in the Turkish fast food retailer Kızılkayalar. Other variations include lamb burgers and offal-burgers, which are offered by local fast food businesses and global chains alike, such as McDonald's and Burger King. Almost all major fast food chains deliver.

=== United Kingdom and Ireland ===
Hamburgers in the UK and Ireland are very similar to those in the US, and the same big two chains dominate there as in the U.S. — McDonald's and Burger King. The menus offered to both countries are virtually identical. In Ireland, the burger-serving food outlet Supermac's is widespread throughout the country. In Ireland, Abrakebabra, which began as a kebab restaurant, and Eddie Rocket's are also major chains.

A native rival to the big two U.S. chains was the fast-food chain popular in Britain, Wimpy, originally known as Wimpy Bar (opened 1954 at the Lyon's Corner House in Coventry Street London), which served its hamburgers on a plate with British-style chips, accompanied by cutlery and delivered to the customer's table. In the late 1970s, to compete with McDonald's, Wimpy began to open American-style counter-service restaurants, and the brand disappeared from many UK high streets when those restaurants were re-branded as Burger Kings between 1989 and 1990 by the then-owner of both brands, Grand Metropolitan. A management buyout in 1990 split the brands again, and now Wimpy table-service restaurants can still be found in many town centers, while new counter-service Wimpys are now often found at highway service stations.

Hamburgers are also available from mobile kiosks, commonly known as "burger vans", particularly at outdoor events such as soccer games. These burgers are usually served without any form of salad, only fried onions and a choice of tomato ketchup, mustard, or brown sauce.

Hamburgers and veggie burgers served with chips, and salad are standard pub grub menu items. Many pubs specialize in "gourmet" burgers. These are usually high-quality minced steak patties topped with things such as blue cheese, brie, avocado, or anchovy mayonnaise.. Some British pubs serve burger patties made from more exotic meats, including venison burgers (sometimes nicknamed Bambi Burgers), bison burgers, ostrich burgers, and in some Australian-themed pubs even kangaroo burgers can be purchased. These burgers are served similarly to the traditional hamburger but are sometimes served with a different sauce, including redcurrant sauce, mint sauce, or plum sauce.

In the early 21st century, "premium" hamburger chains and independent restaurants have arisen, selling burgers produced from meat stated to be of high quality and often organic, usually served to eat on the premises rather than to take to-go. Chains include Gourmet Burger Kitchen, Ultimate Burger, Hamburger Union, and Byron Hamburgers in London. Independent restaurants such as Meatmarket and Dirty Burger developed a style of rich, juicy burger in 2012 which is known as a dirty burger or third-wave burger.

In the UK, as in North America and Japan, the term "burger" can refer simply to the patty, be it beef, some other kind of meat, or vegetarian.

=== United States and Canada ===
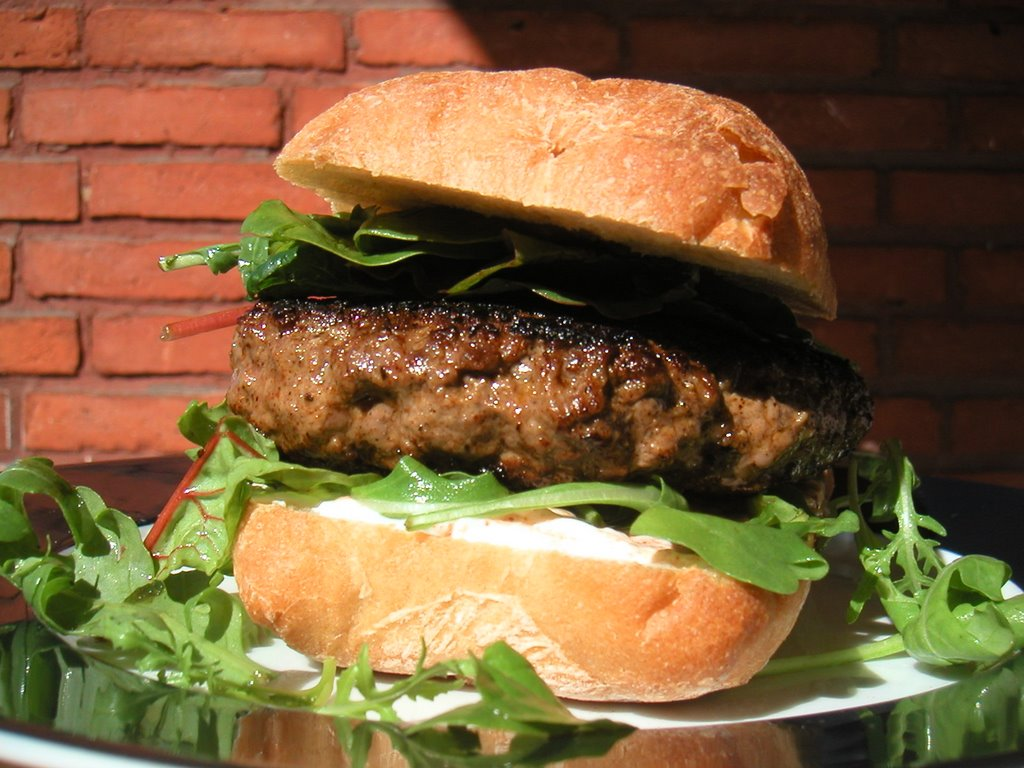
A hamburger served in New York with arugula on a ciabatta roll

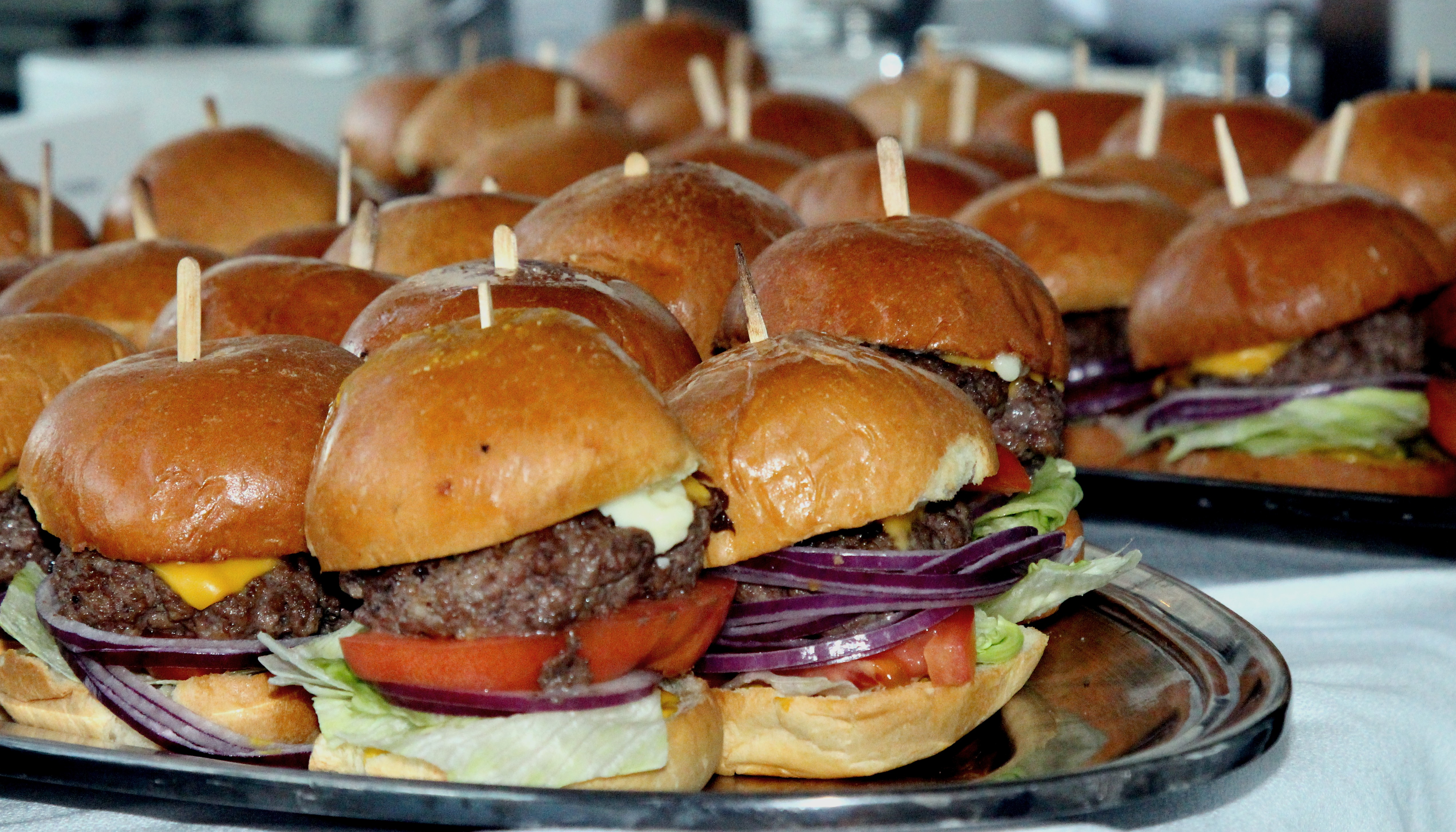
Miniature hamburgers ("sliders")

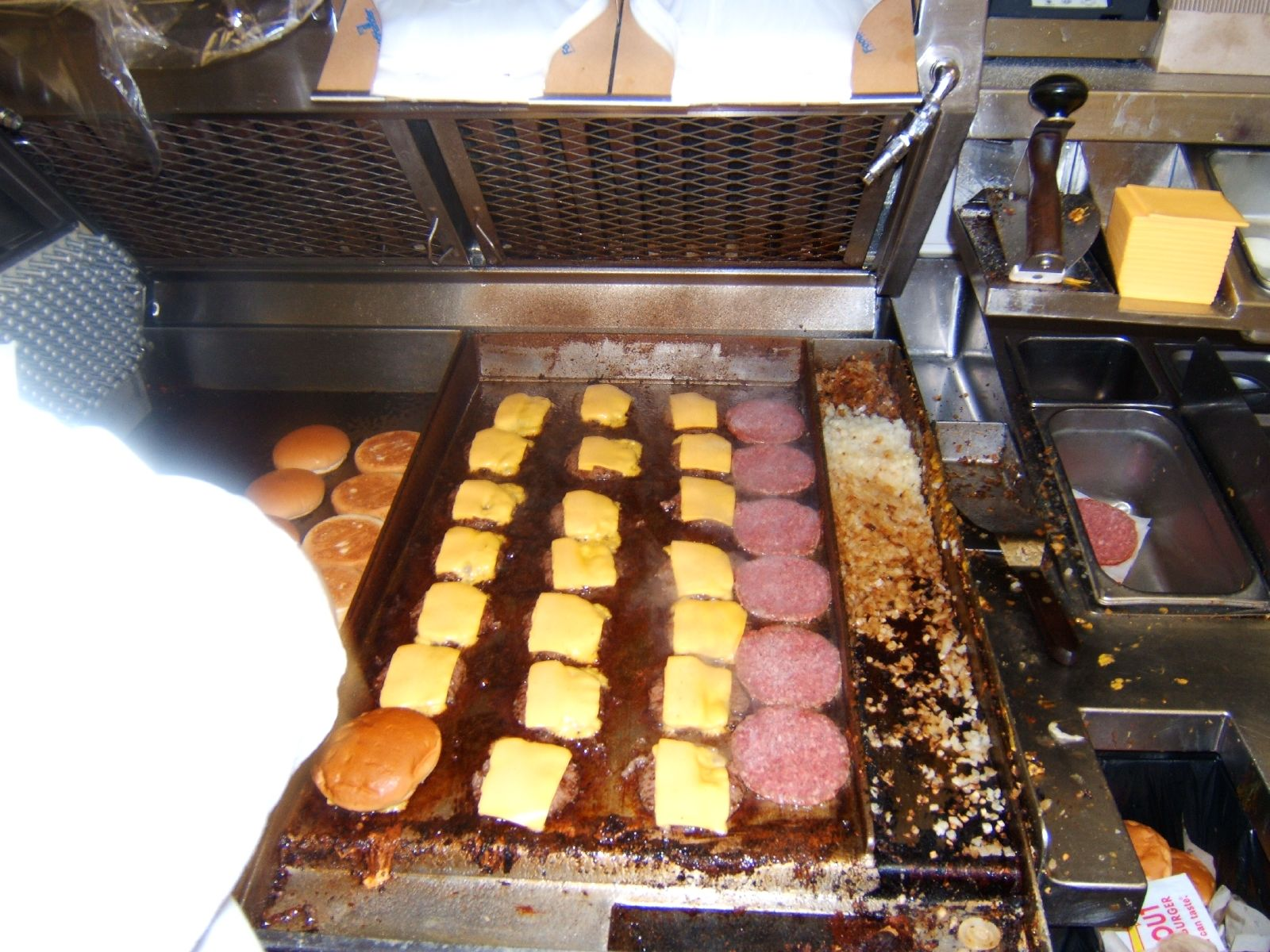
Hamburger preparation in a fast food establishment

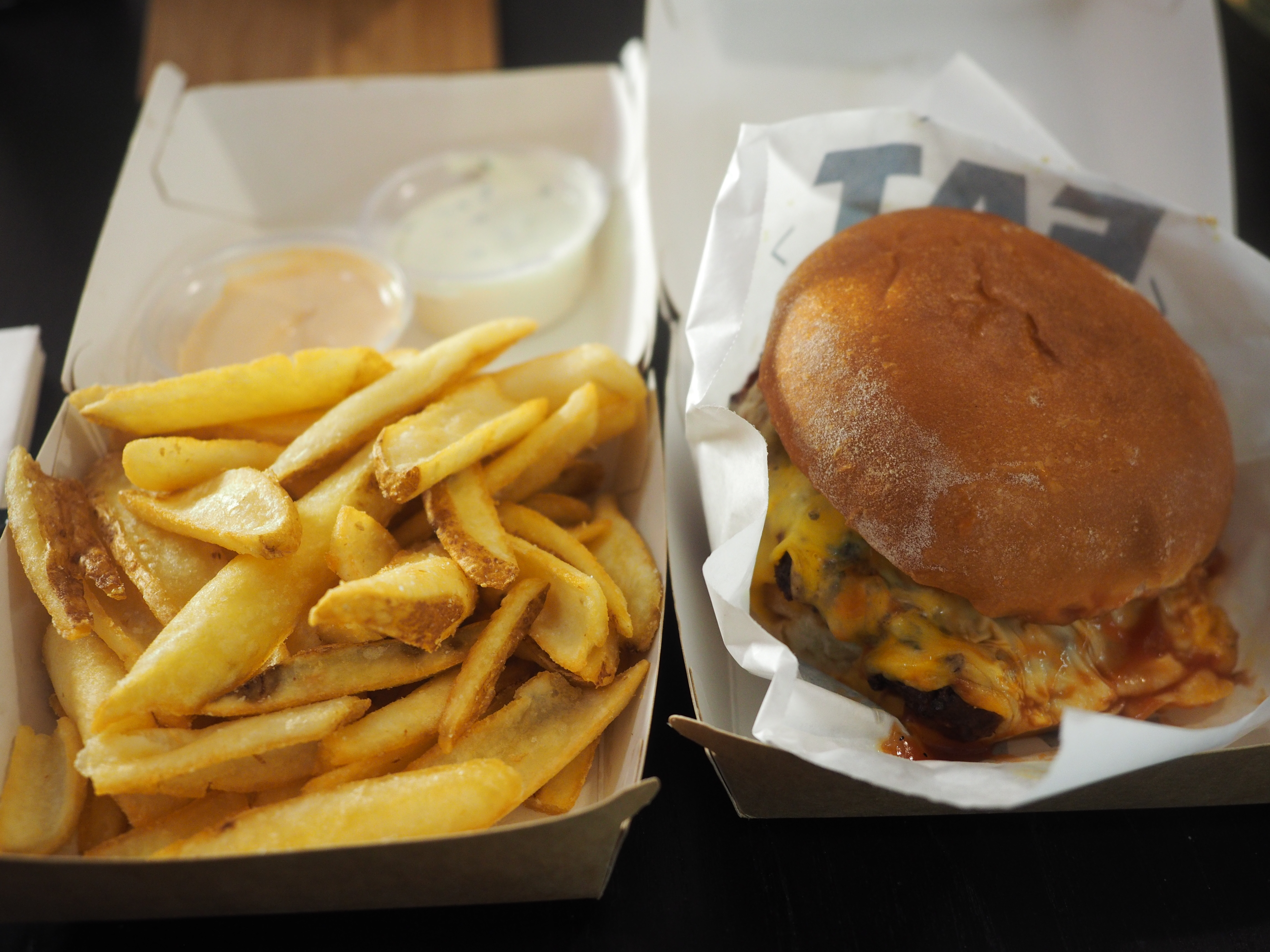
A hamburger with fries bought as take-away, with the hamburger and the fries in separate containers

The hamburger is considered a national dish of the United States. In the United States and Canada, burgers may be classified as either fast food hamburgers or individually prepared burgers made in homes and restaurants. The latter are often prepared with a variety of toppings, including lettuce, tomato, onion, and often sliced pickles (or pickle relish). French fries (or commonly poutine in Canada) often accompany the burger. Cheese (usually processed cheese slices but often Cheddar, Swiss, pepper jack, or blue), may be either melted directly on the meat patty or crumbled on top.

A high-quality hamburger patty is made entirely of ground (minced) beef and seasonings. These may be described as "all-beef hamburger" or "all-beef patties" to distinguish them from inexpensive hamburgers made with cost-savers like added flour, textured vegetable protein, ammonia treated defatted beef trimmings, advanced meat recovery, or other fillers. In the 1930s, ground liver was sometimes added. Some cooks prepare their patties with binders like eggs or breadcrumbs. Seasonings may include salt and pepper, parsley, onions, soy sauce, Thousand Island dressing, onion soup mix, or Worcestershire sauce. Many name-brand seasoned salt products are also used.

Condiments might be added to a hamburger or may be offered separately on the side, including ketchup, mustard, mayonnaise, relish, salad dressings and barbecue sauce. Other toppings can include bacon, avocado or guacamole, sliced sautéed mushrooms, cheese sauce, chili (usually without beans), fried egg, scrambled egg, feta cheese, blue cheese, salsa, pineapple, jalapeños and other kinds of chili peppers, anchovies, slices of ham or bologna, pastrami or teriyaki-seasoned beef, tartar sauce, french fries, onion rings or potato chips.

A patty melt consists of a patty, sautéed onions and cheese between two slices of rye bread. The sandwich is then buttered and fried.

A slider is a tiny square hamburger patty served on an equally small bun and usually sprinkled with diced onions. According to the earliest citations, the name originated aboard U.S. Navy ships due to how greasy burgers slid across the galley grill as the ship sailed. Other versions claim the term "slider" originated from the hamburgers that were so greasy they practically slid down flight line galleys at military airfields, or from the fact that the burgers' small size allowed them to "slide" right down the throat in one or two bites.

- In Alberta, Canada, a "kubie burger" is a hamburger made with a pressed Ukrainian sausage (kubasa).
- A butter burger, found commonly throughout Wisconsin and the Upper Midwest, is a normal burger with a pad of butter as a topping or a heavily buttered bun. It is the signature menu item of the restaurant chain Culver's.
- The Fat Boy is a hamburger with chili meat sauce originating in the Greek burger restaurants of Winnipeg, Manitoba
- In Minnesota, a "Juicy Lucy" (also spelled "Jucy Lucy"), is a hamburger with cheese inside the meat patty rather than on top. A piece of cheese is surrounded by raw meat and cooked until it melts, resulting in a molten core within the patty. This hot cheese tends to gush out at the first bite, so servers might instruct customers to let the sandwich cool for a few minutes before consumption.
- A low-carb burger is a hamburger served without a bun and replaced with large slices of lettuce, with mayonnaise or mustard being the sauces primarily used.
- A ramen burger, invented by Keizo Shimamoto, is a hamburger patty sandwiched between two discs of compressed ramen noodles in lieu of a traditional bun.
- Luther Burger is a bacon cheeseburger with two glazed doughnuts instead of buns.
- Steamed cheeseburger is a cheeseburger in which the burger is steamed instead of grilled. It was invented in Connecticut.

==== Fast food ====
Hamburgers are often a feature of fast food restaurants. In the United States, the hamburger patties served by major fast food chains are usually mass-produced in factories and then frozen for delivery to the site. These hamburgers are relatively thin, differing from the traditional American hamburger prepared in homes and conventional restaurants, which is thicker and prepared by hand from ground beef. Most American hamburgers are round, but some fast-food chains, such as Wendy's, Krystal, and White Castle sell square-cut hamburgers. Hamburgers in fast food restaurants are usually grilled on a flat top, but some establishments, such as Burger King, use a gas flame grilling process. At conventional American restaurants, hamburgers may be ordered "rare" but normally are served medium-well or well-done for food safety reasons. Fast food restaurants do not usually offer this option.

The McDonald's fast-food chain sells the Big Mac, one of the world's top-selling hamburgers, with an estimated 550 million sold annually in the United States. Many other major fast-food chains, also rely heavily on hamburger sales, including Burger King (known as Hungry Jack's in Australia), A&W, Culver's, Whataburger, Carl's Jr./Hardee's chain, Wendy's, Jack in the Box, Krystal, White Castle, Cook Out, Harvey's, Hesburger, Supermac's, Shake Shack, In-N-Out Burger, Five Guys, Fatburger, Vera's, Burgerville, Back Yard Burgers, Lick's Homeburger, Roy Rogers, Smashburger, and Sonic. Fuddruckers and Red Robin are hamburger chains that specialize in the mid-tier "restaurant-style" variety of hamburgers.

==== Marketing ====
In the United States, "steak burger" is a marketing term for a hamburger claimed to be of superior quality. In Australia, the term refers to a burger bun containing a steak and is more commonly called a steak sandwich.

Use of the term "steakburger" dates to the 1920s in the United States. In the U.S. in 1934, A.H. "Gus" Belt, the founder of Steak 'n Shake, devised a higher-quality hamburger and offered it as a "steakburger" to customers at the company's first location in Normal, Illinois. This burger used a combination of ground meat from the strip portion of T-bone steak and sirloin steak in its preparation. Steakburgers are a primary menu item at Steak 'n Shake restaurants, and the company's registered trademarks included "original steakburger" and "famous for steakburgers". Steak 'n Shake's "Prime Steakburgers" are now made of choice grade brisket and chuck.

In 2004, Steak 'n Shake sued Burger King over the latter's use of the term Steak Burger in conjunction with one of its menu items, claiming that such use infringed on trademark rights. The case was settled out of court.

==== Cost ====
According to Bloomberg News, the average price of a fast-food restaurant burger in the United States increased by 16% between 2019 and 2024, reaching $8.41 in the second quarter of 2024. Specifically, the iconic Big Mac at McDonald's cost $5.29 during the same period, representing a 21% price increase over the same five-year span.

The cost of Big Mac hamburgers in different countries has been used by The Economist to easily compare purchasing power of different currencies, in what it calls the Big Mac Index.

==== Safety ====
Raw hamburgers may contain harmful bacteria that can produce food-borne illnesses such as Escherichia coli O157:H7, due to the occasional initial improper preparation of the meat, so caution is required for safety during handling and cooking. Because of the potential for food-borne illness, the USDA, recommends hamburgers be cooked to an internal temperature of 160 °F (71 °C). If cooked to this temperature, they are considered well-done.

=== Yugoslavia and Serbia ===
In the former Yugoslavia, and originally in Serbia, there is a local version of the hamburger known as the pljeskavica. It is often served as a patty but may also have a bun.

== Unusual hamburgers ==
- In May 2012, Serendipity 3 was recognized as the Guinness World Records holder for serving the world's most expensive hamburger, the $295 Le Burger Extravagant.
- At $499, the world's largest hamburger commercially available weighs 185.8 pounds (84.3 kg) and is sold at Mallie's Sports Grill & Bar in Southgate, Michigan. Called the "Absolutely Ridiculous Burger", it takes about 12 hours to prepare. It was cooked and adjudicated on May 30, 2009.
- A $777 Kobe beef and Maine lobster burger, topped with caramelized onion, Brie cheese, and prosciutto, was reported available at Le Burger Brasserie, inside the Paris Las Vegas casino.
- On August 5, 2013, the first hamburger grown with cow cells outside a living animal was served. It was the result of a $300,000 research project into cultured meat, led by Mark Post at Maastricht University and sponsored by Google's co-founder Sergey Brin.

== Slang ==
- "$100 hamburger" ("hundred-dollar hamburger") is aviation slang for a general aviation pilot needing an excuse to fly. A $100 hamburger trip typically involves flying a short distance (less than two hours), eating at an airport restaurant, and flying home.

== See also ==
- Chicken nugget
- Frikandel
- Kofta
- Bun kebab
- Hot dog
- List of hamburger restaurants
- List of sandwiches
- Steak tartare
- Sloppy joe – Variety of sandwich made with ground meat
