= Spice Burger =

Breaded beef patty created in Ireland

A Spice Burger (Irish: burgar spíosraí) is a spice-flavoured breaded meat patty, popular in Irish traditional chippers.

The spice burger is made to a specific recipe developed in the early 1950s by pork butcher Maurice Walsh, and later manufactured and sold by Walsh Family Foods Limited and (when Walsh ceased trading) then Keystone Foods.

A legal row emerged in 2009 between Walsh Family Foods, and a former director regarding the ownership of the recipe. It was resolved in September 2009.

In 2026, it was announced that the retail range of spice burgers was ending, though they would still be supplied to chippers.
