= Rice burger =

Type of Japanese burger

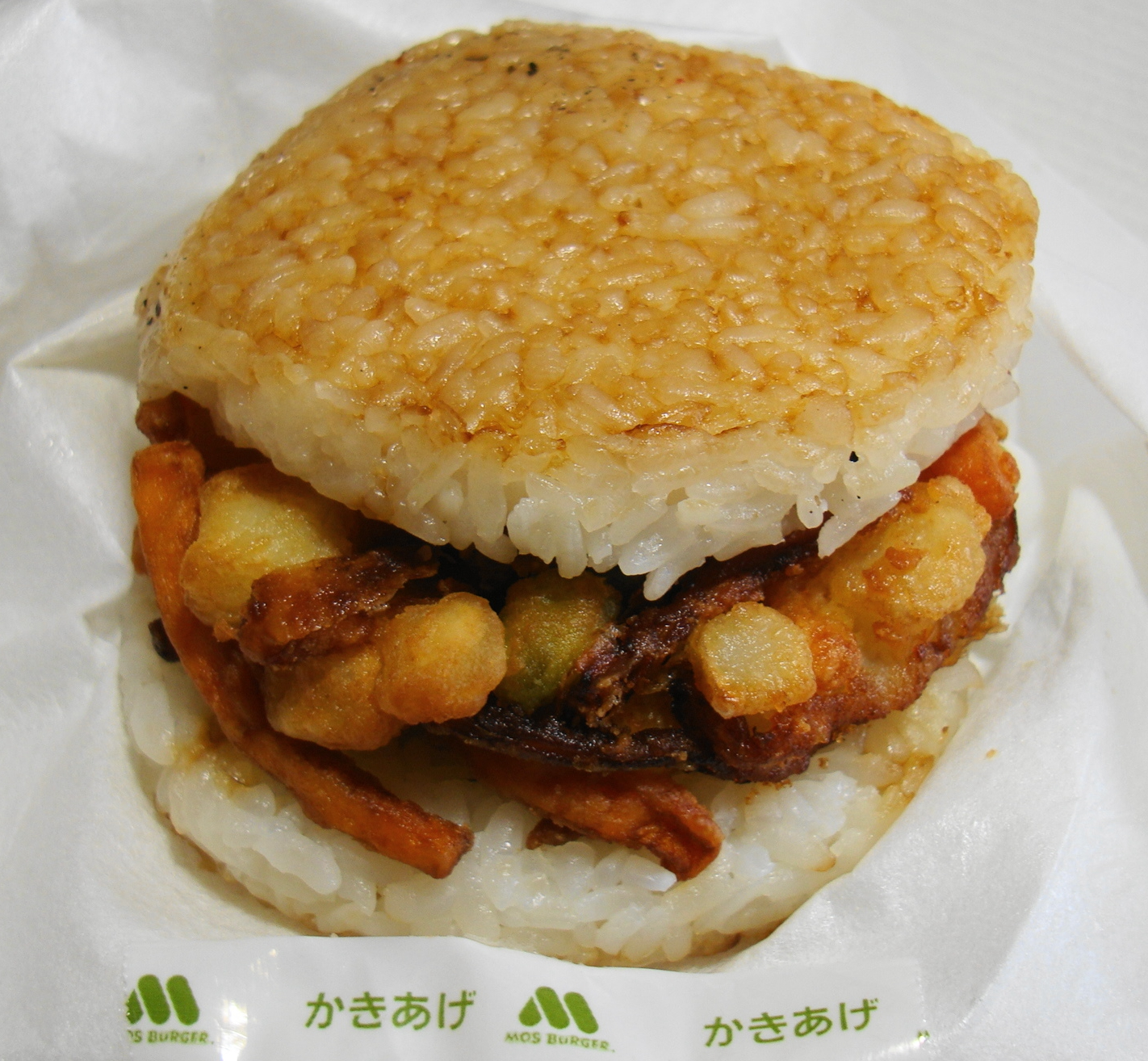
- A MOS Burger rice burger
- Type: Sandwich
- Place of origin: Japan
- Main ingredients: Rice bun and patty

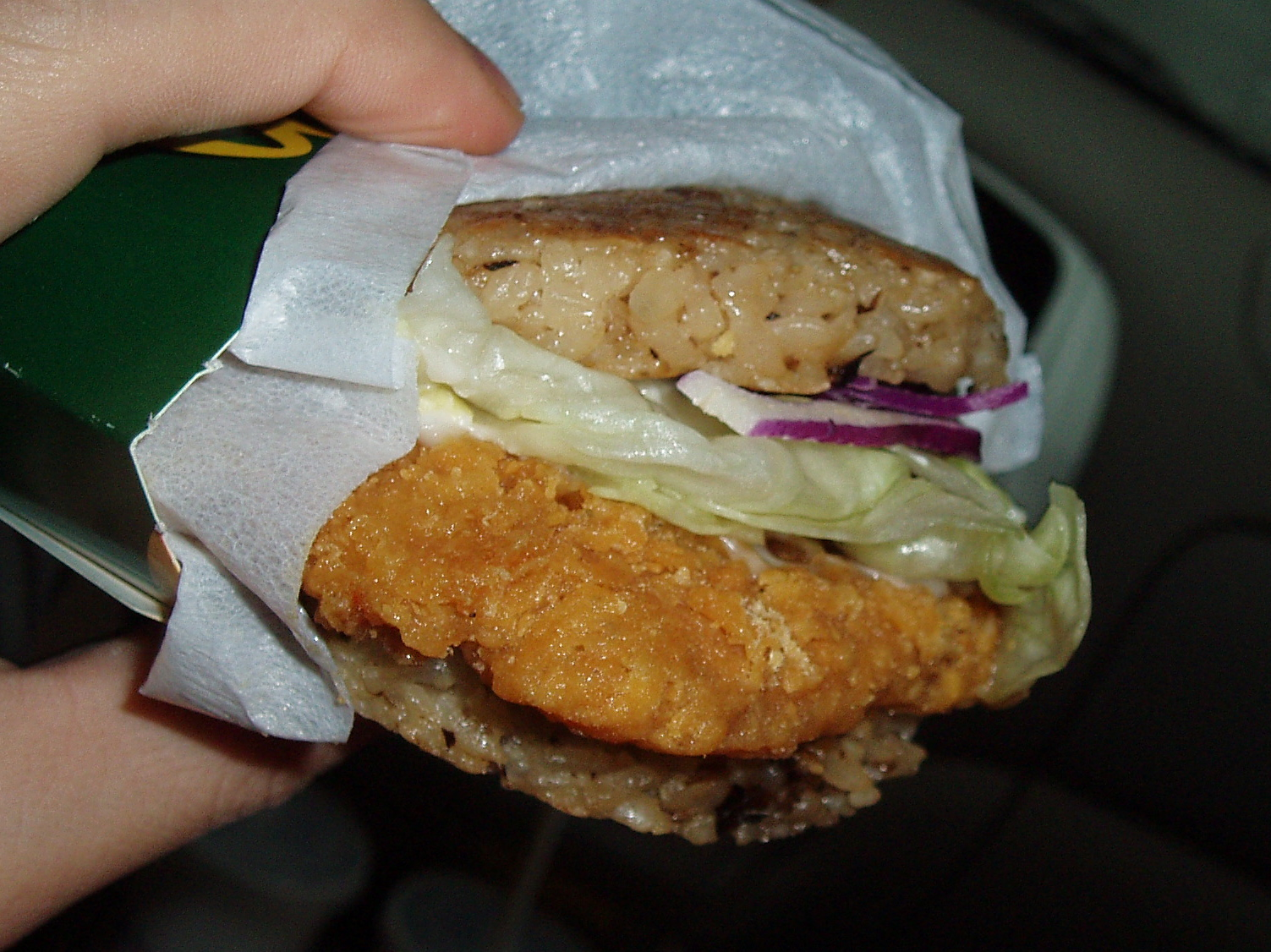
A chicken rice burger

A rice burger or riceburger is a variation on the traditional hamburger with compressed rice patties substituted for the hamburger buns. The MOS Burger fast-food restaurant chain introduced the rice burger in Japan 1987, and since then it has become a popular food item in East Asia. Beginning around 2005 McDonald's also offered a rice burger in some of its Asian stores, with mixed results. In South Korea they are known as "bapburgers" (bap/bab means rice in Korean language). Popular Korean-style rice burgers include fillings such as stir-fried kimchi and tuna with mayonnaise.

== See also ==
- List of hamburgers
