= Bøfsandwich =

Danish hamburger

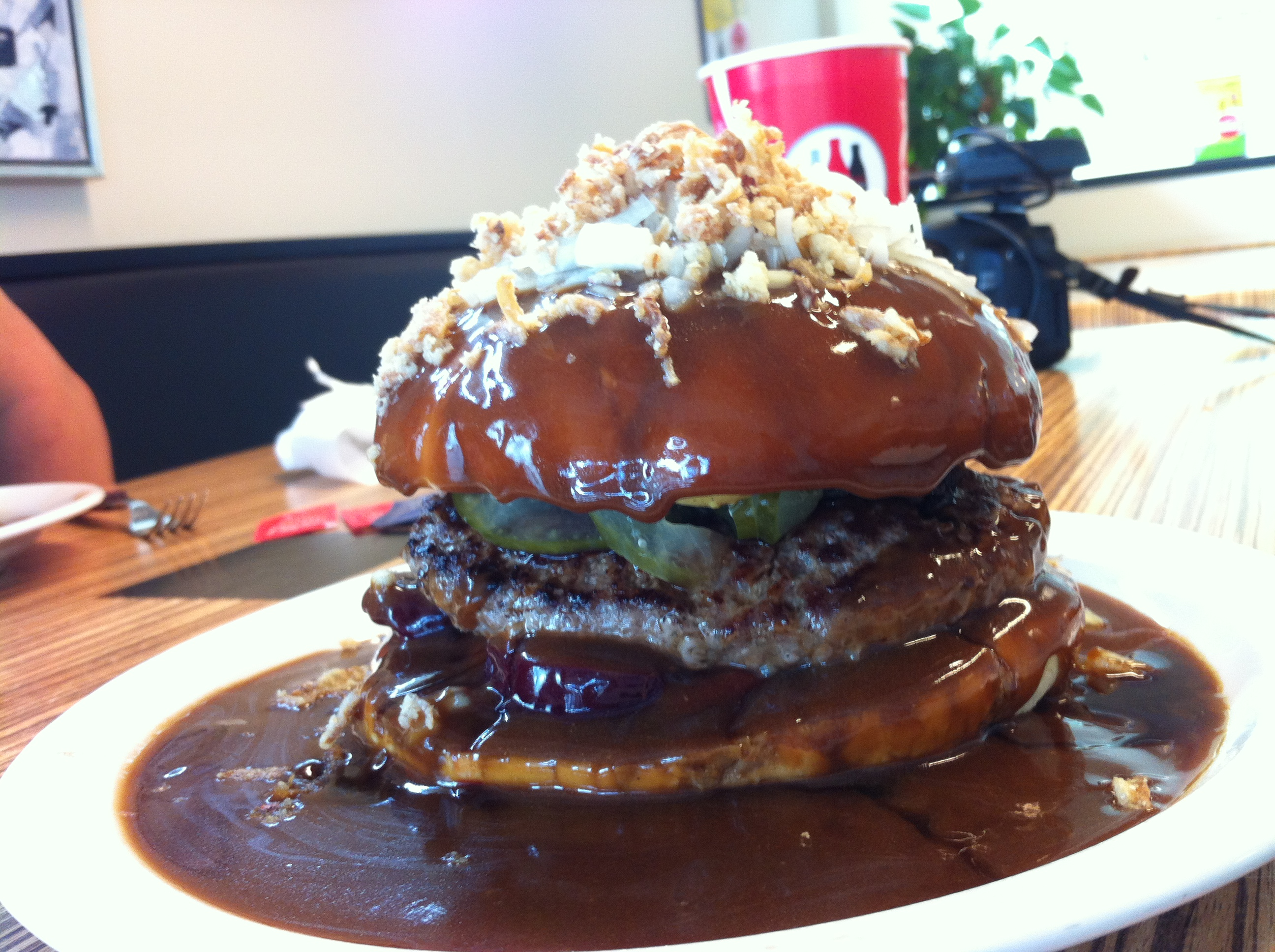
- A regional bøfsandwich variation with brown gravy
- Type: Hamburger
- Course: Main course
- Place of origin: Denmark
- Region or state: Copenhagen
- Invented: 1949
- Main ingredients: Ground meat, bread
- Ingredients generally used: Pickled beetroot, pickled cucumber, onions, brown gravy (optional)

A bøfsandwich (lit. 'steak sandwich'), is the classic Danish version of a hamburger. It contains the hamburger elements of a cooked ground beef patty placed inside a sliced bread roll.

Bøfsandwiches are typically sold from hot dog stands and in traditional fast food establishments, and have been described as an "archetypal Danish snackbar classic". Some traditional Danish restaurants have also started serving gourmet versions, with the addition of e.g. soft grilled onions.

Fans of the bøfsandwich maintain a Facebook page which announces "Denmark's best bøfsandwich" each year.

== Condiments ==
The traditional condiments are ketchup, mustard, remoulade, sliced dill pickles, raw onions, and crisp fried onions.

== Local variations ==
Primarily in the Jutland region of Denmark, it is customary to serve the bøfsandwich with sliced beetroots inside and brown gravy poured over the sandwich. This version is sometimes dubbed 'gravy burger' by foreigners. Other local variants may include gherkins or pickled red cabbage.

== International variations ==
In Canada, the hot hamburger, which consists of a beef patty, buns, and gravy poured on top, somewhat resembles the bøfsandwich.

== See also ==
- Sloppy joe
