= Patty =

Serving of chopped ingredients formed into a disc

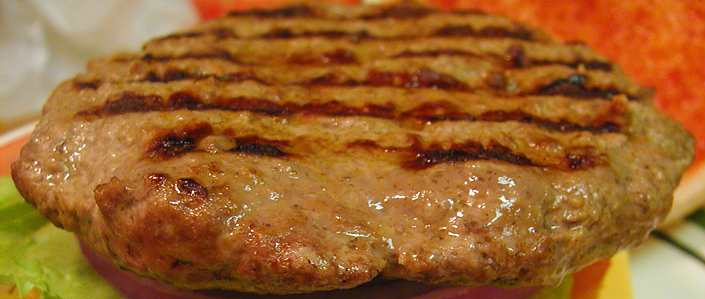
- A ground beef hamburger patty
- Alternative names: Burger
- Type: Main dish, Sandwich
- Serving temperature: Hot or Warm
- Main ingredients: Ground meat, meat alternatives, vegetables, grains, and/or legumes

A patty is a flattened, usually round, serving of ground meat or legumes, grains, vegetables, or meat alternatives. Common ground meat used include beef, chicken, and salmon. Patties are found in multiple cuisines throughout the world.

The ingredients are compacted and shaped, usually cooked, and served in various ways.

== Etymology ==
The term originated in the 17th century as an English alteration of the French word pâté, originally meaning a pastry with a meat filling, and later the filling itself.

== Terminology ==
The term "patty" is used in many varieties of English, but less frequently in Britain and Ireland than in the United States. Merriam-Webster defines it as "a small flat cake of chopped food", Cambridge as "pieces of food, especially meat, formed into a thin, circular shape and then usually cooked". In some countries, patties may be called "discs."

Similar-shaped cakes not made from ground beef may also be called "burgers": "fish burgers" may be made from reshaped mechanically separated meat. Patties made from chicken meat may be called chicken patties.

Veggie burger patties are made without meat and instead use legumes, grains, other mixed vegetables, and/or soy products such as tofu or tempeh or seitan, a product made of wheat gluten, often mixed with a binding agent.

== Variations and serving styles ==
=== Croquettes ===
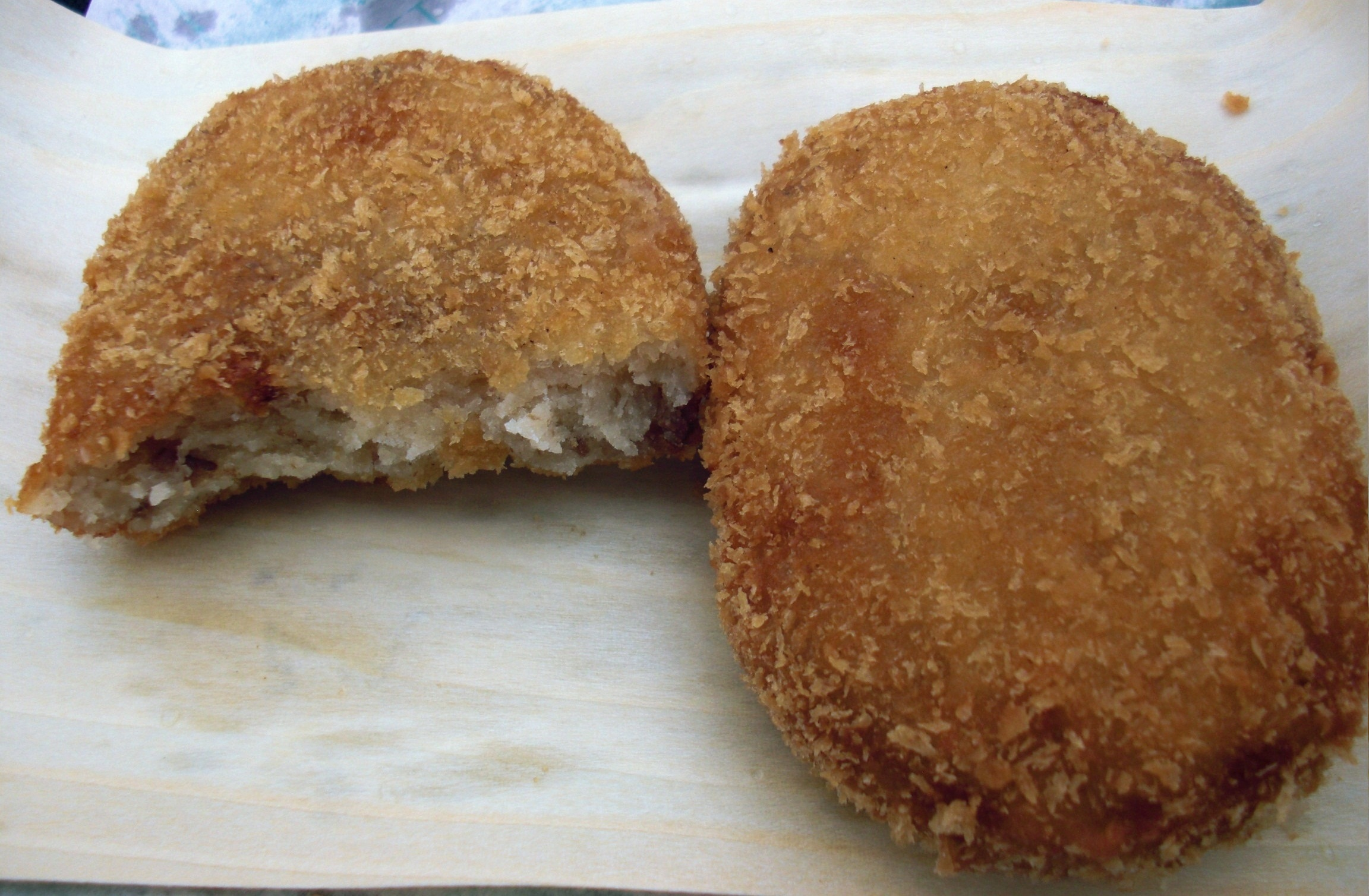
Korokke

Patties can be breaded and deep-fried, producing croquettes such as crab cakes. In Ireland, traditional chippers often serve batter burgers (a beef-based patty dipped in batter and deep fried). A batter burger served as a sandwich is called a wurly burger, and is believed to have been invented by the Mona Lisa chipper in Crumlin, Dublin. In Japan the korokke is an example. Rissoles are meat (typically beef), or fish and other ingredients, coated in breadcrumbs or less frequently battered, and deep-fried; they are found in various European cuisines.

=== Cutlets ===
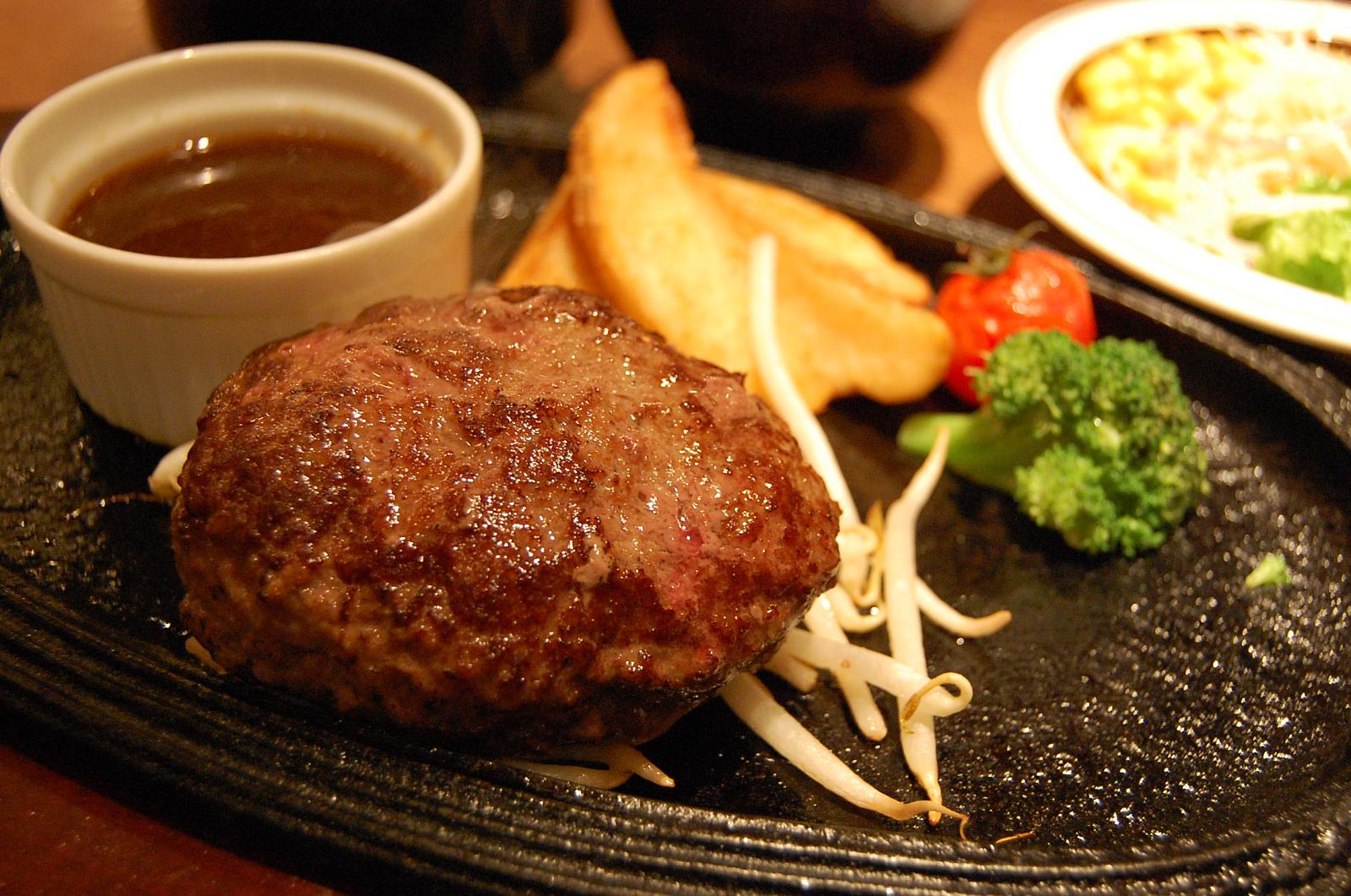
Salisbury steak

Patties can be treated as a cutlet and eaten with a knife and fork in dishes like Salisbury steak, the German Hamburg steak, or the Serbo-Croatian pljeskavica, or with chopsticks in dishes such as Songjeong tteok-galbi. Other examples include the Russian Pozharsky cutlet.

=== Fritters ===
Aloo tikki is a potato patty that originated in the Indian subcontinent. A related dish is ragda pattice, which covers the potato patty in a gravy.

An arepa is a dish of maize and other ingredients shaped into a patty and griddled; it has been eaten in parts of Central and South American since pre-Columbian times.

=== Quenelles ===
Gefilte fish is often served as a quenelle, a patty shaped into a flattened egg.

=== Sandwich fillings ===
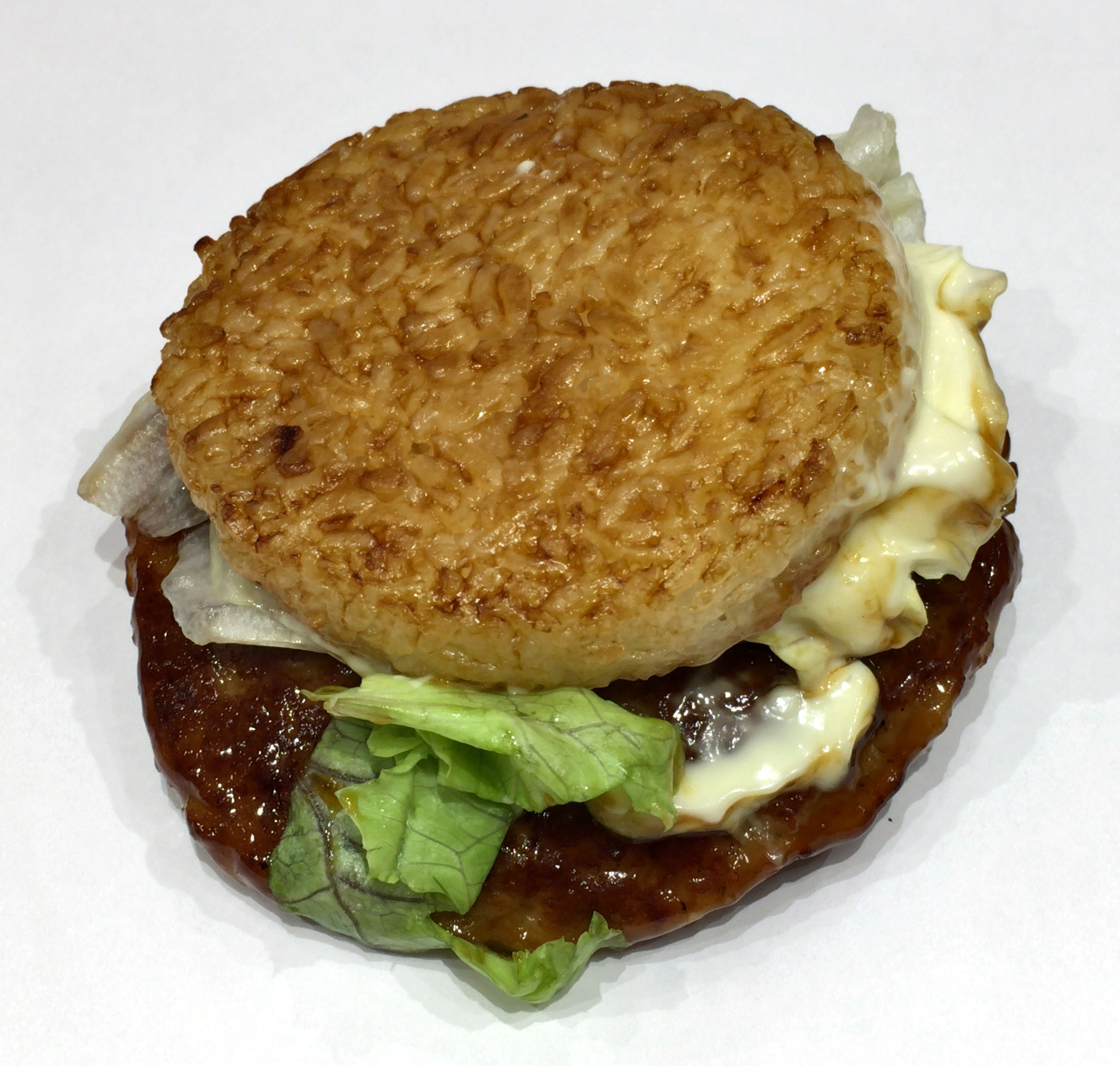
Rice burger

Patties are often served as sandwiches, typically in buns, making a type of sandwich called a "burger", or a hamburger if the patty is made from ground beef, or sometimes between slices of bread. An American patty melt is a ground beef patty topped with melted cheese (typically Swiss) served on toasted bread, typically rye.

In Ireland, traditional chippers often serve sandwiches called spice burgers.

In Japan and Korea, a ground beef patty is sometimes served as a sandwich on a "bun" made of compressed rice; the sandwich is called a rice burger.

=== Tartares ===
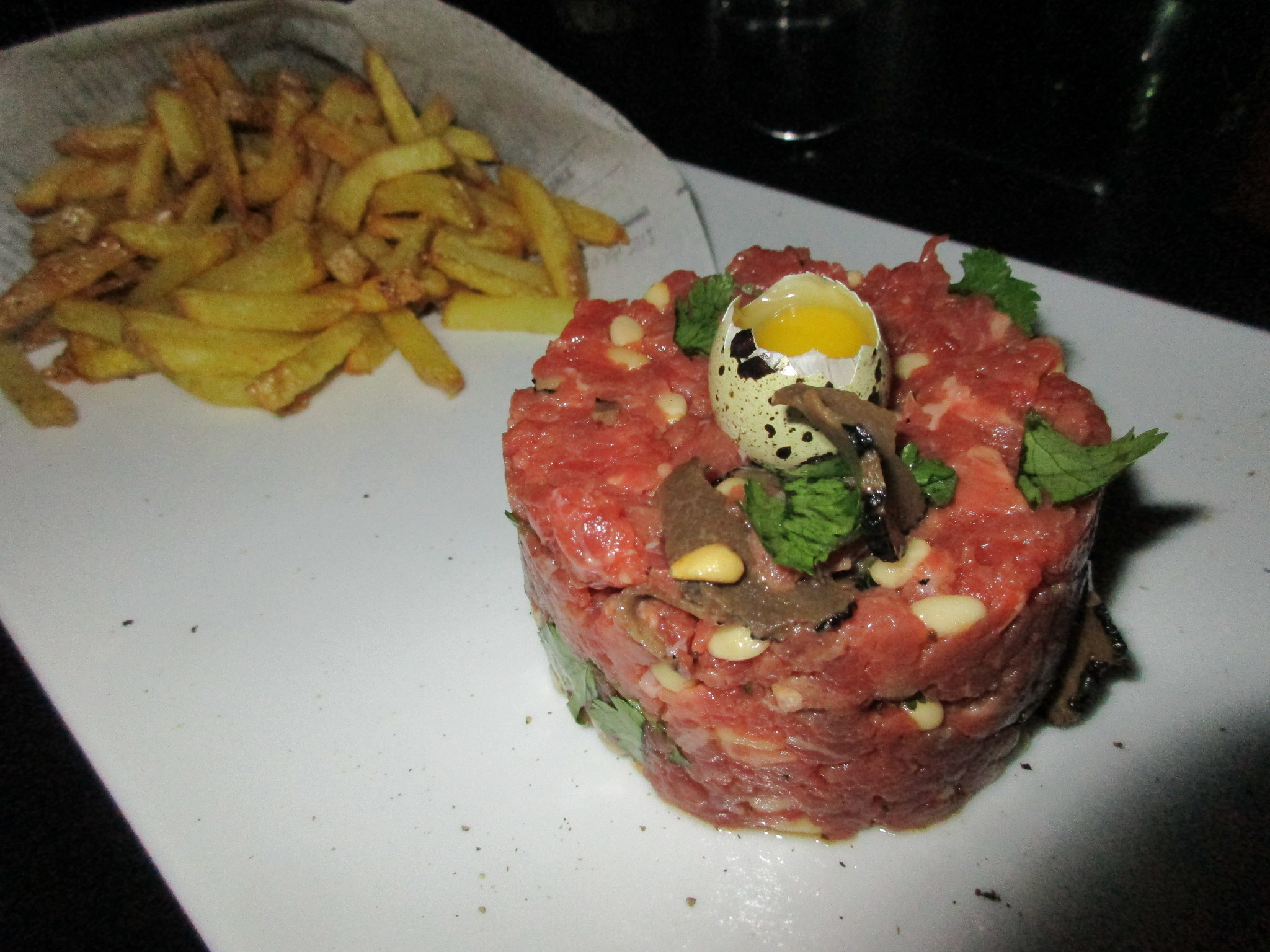
Steak tartare

Some patties, like steak tartare and Middle Eastern kibbeh nayeh, are served raw.

== Commercial production ==
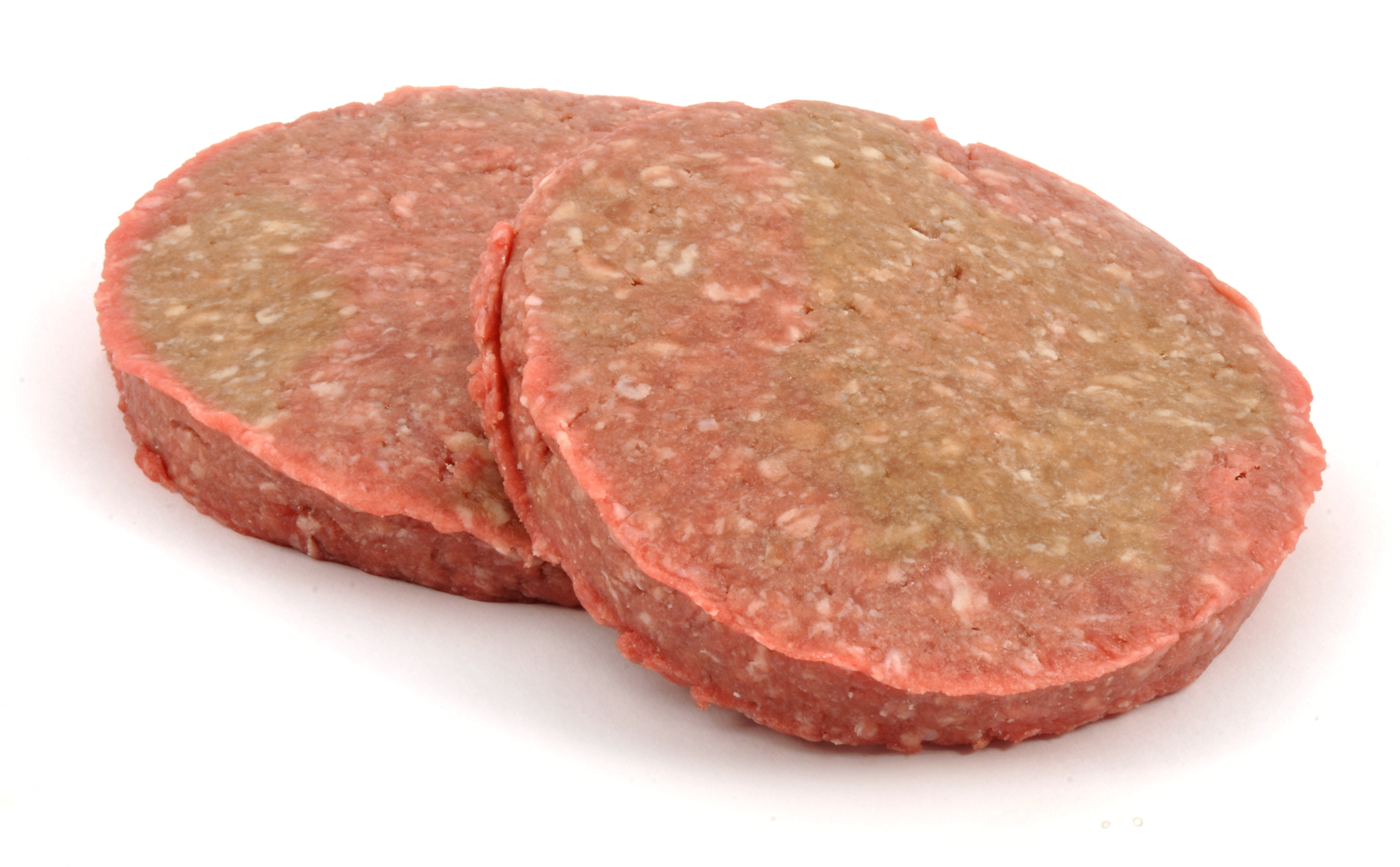
Pre-formed hamburger patties

Commercially produced patties are machine-formed.

With mass-produced patties, it is not uncommon to find them with seemingly abnormal shapes or a bumpy perimeter. These groove-like bumps are caused by the machine that forms the patties. They are used in production to keep the patties in line, so they will not fall off the assembly line, and can be manipulated by the various machines. In other boxed patties, small punctures can be seen in the top and bottom sides of the patty. These punctures are there for similar reasons.

== See also ==
- Kofta, a related dish that is formed into patties or balls
- Chapli kebab
- List of hamburgers
- Meatball, a similar dish but rounded rather than flattened
