= Popl (restaurant) =

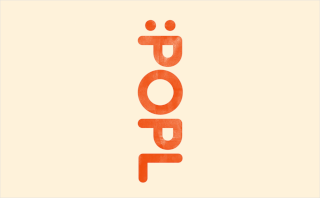
- Interactive map of Popl

Restaurant information
- Established: 3 December 2020 (5 years ago)
- Owner: René Redzepi
- Head chef: Toni Toivanen
- Food type: Hamburger
- Dress code: Casual
- Location: Strandgade 108, Copenhagen, 1401, Denmark
- Coordinates: 55°40′40″N 12°35′52″E
- Seating capacity: 90
- Reservations: Yes
- Website: poplburger.com

Popl is a burger restaurant run by Noma chefs in Copenhagen, Denmark. The name comes from the Latin word "populus" meaning community of people, but also refers to poplar wood. Opened in 2020, the restaurant is known for approaching burgers with the same innovative techniques employed at Noma, but keeping a focus on affordability and a simple menu.

== History ==
The burger served at Popl was originally invented at Noma. During the first nationwide lockdown of the COVID-19 pandemic, seeing their restaurant closed for the time being, the chefs at Noma decided to switch their focus to something they could sell as take-out for the time being, eventually settling on the burger. They then spent a few months developing both a classic and vegetarian burger, and re-opened Noma as a burger restaurant/wine bar on 25 May. The burgers turned out to be so popular that lines formed down the street every day during the time the temporary burger restaurant was open, and prompted Noma to look into opening a place where they could be part of a more permanent menu.

This eventually resulted in the opening of the Popl burger restaurant on 3 December 2020.

== Burgers ==
There are three burgers on the menu. A cheeseburger, a vegetarian burger, and a vegan burger. The three burgers are based on two patties. The meat patty is made of beef from free-range cattle on the Danish west coast, while the veggie patty is made from quinoa fermented over two days at Noma's fermentation lab.
