= Buffalo burger =

Hamburgers made with meat from the American bison

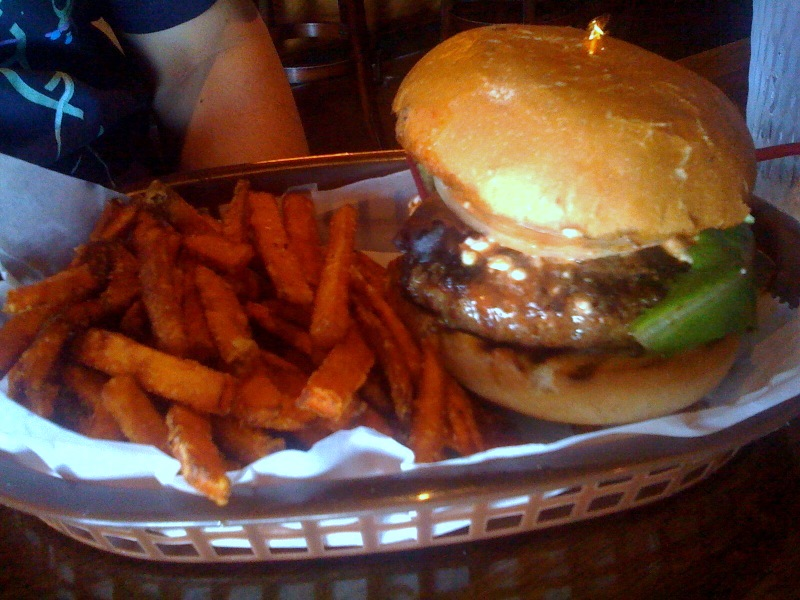
A buffalo burger and sweet potato fries

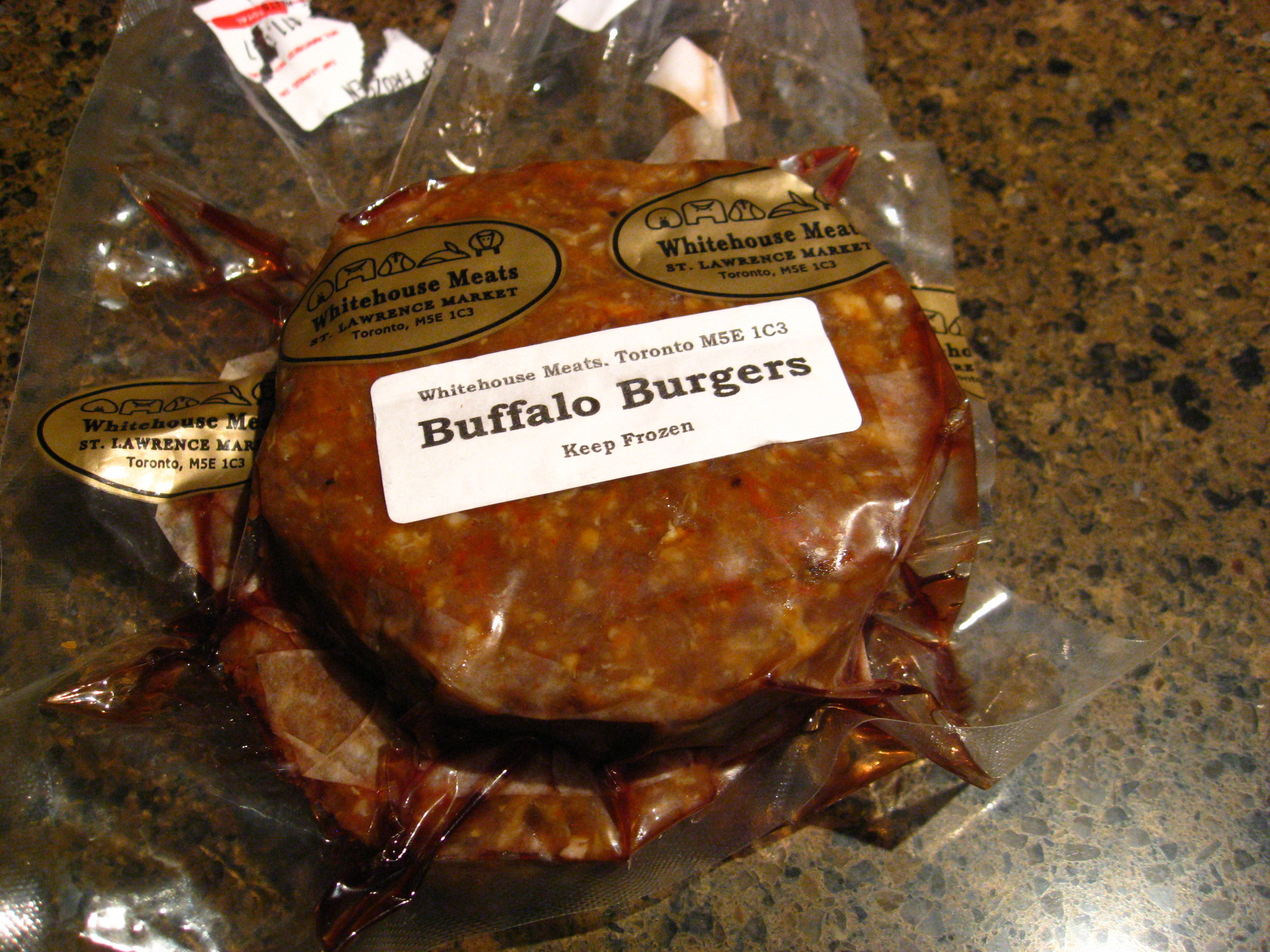
Frozen buffalo burger patties

Buffalo burgers are burgers made with meat from the water buffalo, beefalo or American bison (Bison bison).

== Description ==
Author Dan O'Brien said that buffalo meat is sweet and tender and has a unique taste. He also said that it has to be prepared as carefully as fresh fish. The magazine Women's Health said that the taste of beef burgers and buffalo burgers is almost indistinguishable, but that buffalo burgers are a bit sweeter and more tender. It normally costs more than beef.

== Nutrition ==
Buffalo burgers have less cholesterol, less fat, and less food energy than burgers made from beef or chicken. The American Heart Association recommended buffalo burgers in 1997 as more heart-healthy than chicken or beef. The burger is high in nutrients such as protein, zinc, and vitamin B12. Buffalo burgers are more healthy than beef because bison do not store as much fat as cattle. An 85-gram (3-ounce) serving of buffalo meat has 390 kilojoules (93 kilocalories) and 1.8 g of fat compared to 770 kJ (183 kcal) and 8.7 g of fat in the same serving as beef. A recipe for simple buffalo burgers was listed in Men's Health Muscle Chow. The magazine EatingWell came up with a buffalo burger recipe that is low in cholesterol and high in calcium.

== See also ==
- List of hamburgers
