= Casino (disambiguation) =

A casino is a facility that houses and accommodates certain types of gambling activities.

Casino may also refer to:

== Places ==
- Casino, New South Wales, Australia
  - Casino railway station, New South Wales, Australia
  - The 20th-century electoral district of Casino in New South Wales, Australia
- Casino at Marino, in Dublin, Ireland
- Casinos, Valencia, a municipality in Spain
- The Casino Lakes in Idaho, United States
- The Casino (Seattle), a bar in Seattle, Washington, United States
- Casino Square, Monte Carlo, Monaco; at the Monte Carlo Casino
  - Casino, on the Circuit de Monaco for the Monaco Grand Prix
- Catalina Casino, Santa Catalina Island, California, United States

== People ==
- Albie Casiño (born 1993), Filipino actor
- Teodoro Casiño (born 1968), Filipino politician and communicator
- David Casinos (born 1972), Spanish paralympian athlete

== Arts, entertainment, and media ==
=== Games ===
- Casino (card game)
- Casino (video game) (1978), for Atari 2600

=== Music ===
==== Groups ====
- Casino (band), English alternative rock band
- The Casinos, an American popular music group

==== Albums ====
- Casino (Al Di Meola album) (1978)
- Casino (Alcazar album) (2000)
- Casino (Blue Rodeo album) (1990)
- Casino (Iris album) (1999)
- Casino (Physical Therapy album) (1997)
- Casino (Baby Keem album) (2026)

==== Songs ====
- "Casino" (song), by Baby Keem
- "Casino", a song by Tucker Wetmore from What Not To (2025)

=== Television ===
- Casino (game show), a Norwegian game show airing from 1989–1996 and 2003–2004
- The Casino (American TV series), a 2004 American reality show
- The Casino (Indian TV series), a 2020 Indian web series
- Casino (South Korean TV series), 2022 South Korean series
- "Casino" (Duty Free), a 1984 episode
- "Casino" (Malcolm in the Middle episode), a 2000 episode
- "The Casino" (What We Do in the Shadows), an episode of the American TV series What We Do in the Shadows
- "Casino", a 2015 episode of the British sitcom SunTrap

=== Film ===
- The Casino (film), a 1972 Hong Kong drama directed by Cheung Chang Chak
- Casino (1980 film), directed by Don Chaffey; an adventure film set on a cruise ship
- Casino (1995 film), directed by Martin Scorsese, set in Las Vegas, stars Robert De Niro, Sharon Stone, Joe Pesci and others
- Casino (2023 film), a Bangladeshi crime film directed by Saikat Nasir

=== Other arts, entertainment, and media ===
- Casino (dance)

== Brands and enterprises ==
- Casino Stadium, in Bregenz, Austria
- Epiphone Casino, an electric guitar model
- Groupe Casino, a French corporation

== Computing and technology ==
- Casino (computer virus), affecting systems running MS-DOS
- CASINO, a quantum Monte Carlo code
- CASINO ("Computer Able to Select INternal Orders") a CIA-designed variant of Digital Equipment Corporation's PDP-3 computer

== Other uses ==
- Casino (cocktail), a gin cocktail
- Casino faction, a 19th-century German parliamentary alliance
- Casino Filipino, a casino chain in the Philippines
- Casino Pier, an amusement park in Seaside Heights, New Jersey

== See also ==
- Casina (architecture)
- Casino Theatre (disambiguation)
- Casino Royale (disambiguation)
- Cassino, Italian commune
- Casio
- Kasino (comedian), 1950-born comedian from Indonesia
