= Cassine =

Cassine may refer to:

- Cassine, Piedmont, town and commune of the Province of Alessandria in the Italian region Piedmont
- Cassine (plant), genus of trees, of the plant family Celastraceae

== See also ==
- Casine (disambiguation)
- Cassino (disambiguation)
