= Casino Theatre =

Casino Theatre or Casino Theater may refer to:

- Casino Theatre (Toronto), a burlesque theatre
- Casino Theatre (Copenhagen) (1848–1937)
- Casino Theatre (San Diego)
- Casino Theatre (New York City) (1882–1930)
- Earl Carroll Theatre or Casino Theatre, a Broadway theatre
- Casino Theatre (Mount Pocono, Pennsylvania)
- Casino Theatre (Gunnison, Utah)
