= Casinos =

Casinos may refer to:

- Casinos, Spain, municipality in Valencia
- David Casinos (born 1972), Spanish Paralympian athlete
- The Casinos, an American popular music group

== See also ==
- Casino (disambiguation)
