= Burger King sliders =

Series of sandwiches sold by Burger King

BK Burger Shots
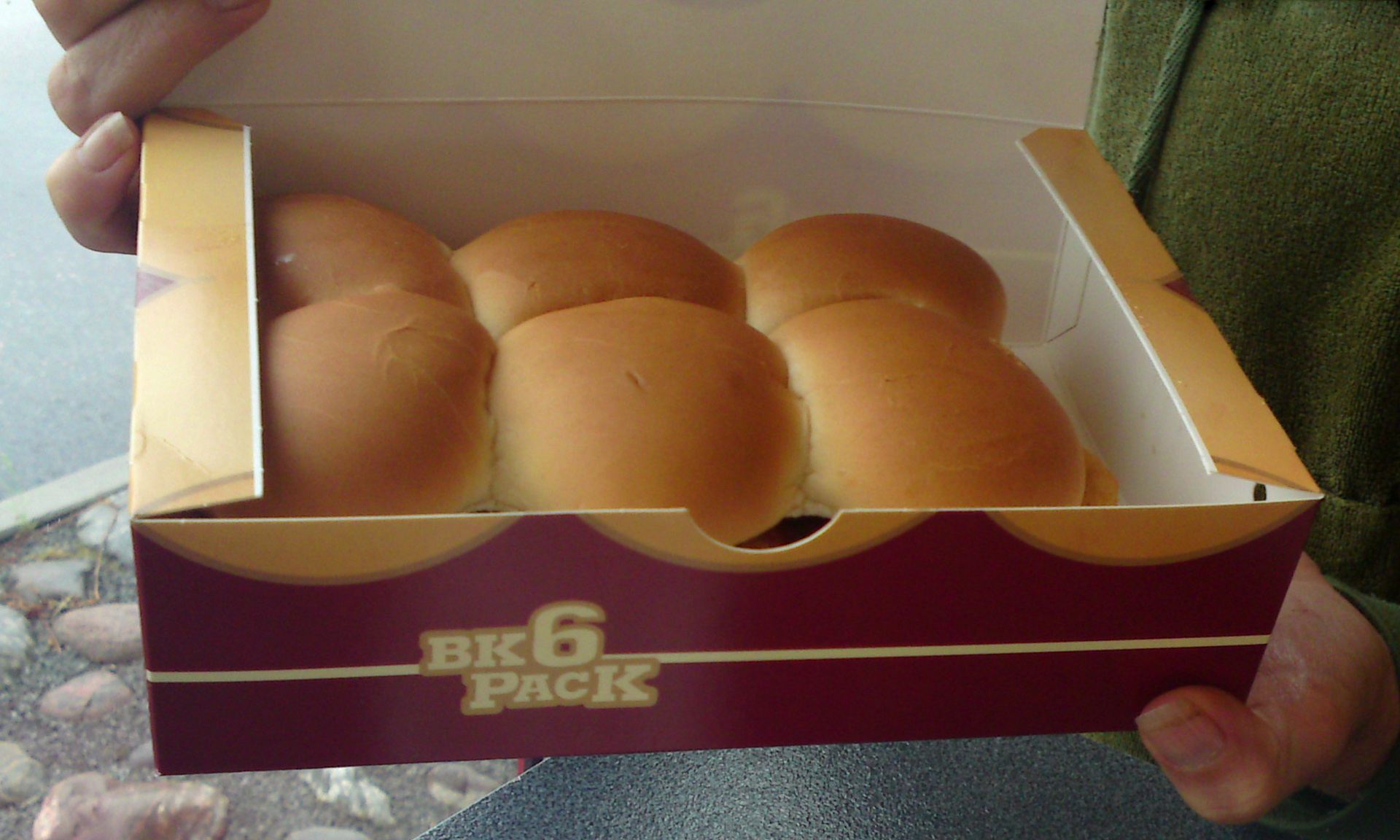
- BK Burger Shots, one example of Burger King's various slider products

Nutritional value per 2 Burger shots
- Energy: 220 kcal (920 kJ)
- Carbohydrates: 18 g
- Sugars: 4 g
- Fat: 10 g
- Saturated: 4 g
- Trans: 0.5 g
- Protein: 14 g
Vitamins and minerals
Minerals	Quantity %DV^{†}
Sodium	18% 420 mg
- Other constituents: Quantity
- Cholesterol: 35 mg
- ^{†}Percentages estimated using US recommendations for adults. Source: www.BK.com (PDF)

Burger King sliders, comprising several varieties of mini-sandwiches, are a series of sandwiches that have been sold by international fast-food restaurant chain Burger King since the 1980s. Burger Bundles was the first iteration, a set of three small hamburgers or cheeseburgers. These sandwiches were eventually replaced with a reformulated product called Burger Buddies that was sold in pairs. After a change in management in 2004, Burger Buddies were re-released as BK Burger Shots. The company has also sold several chicken and breakfast sandwich versions of these products.

During the periods these products were sold, they were often the center of product advertising for the company. Additionally, as a major products in the company's portfolio, Burger King had registered many global trademarks to protect its investment in the products, most of which have since lapsed.

== History ==
In 1987, Burger King offered a set of miniature burgers called Burger Bundles. The Burger Bundles were sold in a set of three or six, much like White Castle or Krystal burgers, but served in a single package. At the time of introduction, sales of the sandwich greatly exceeded industry expectations, drawing in the pre-teen and teen demographics in large numbers. A problem with the silver dollar-sized patties used at the time was that they were too small for the company's automated broiler's chain and would fall through. The company discontinued the Burger Bundles in late 1987.

The sandwich was reintroduced in a slightly different format called Burger Buddies. Instead of three or six miniature hamburger patties, it had a single number eight-shaped patty that was served on a pair of co-joined buns. The sandwich was sold for 99¢ and was designed to be torn into two smaller sandwiches. There was a breakfast version of the Burger Buddies called the Breakfast Buddies that had eggs, cheese and a sausage patty, again for 99¢. Breakfast menus at the time also began selling mini hash-browns, which resemble Tater Tots. Another variant of the Burger Bundles was introduced later in 1987 in chicken sandwich form called Chicken Bundles.

== Product description ==
BK Burger Shots consisted of a figure-8 shaped burger with mustard, ketchup and pickles on a pair of co-joined buns without sesame seeds. They were sold in two- or six-piece packs.

=== Variants ===
- BK Breakfast Shots have an egg, a cheese sauce, American cheese and a choice of ham, bacon or a sausage patty served on the same style co-joined bun, and are sold in two- or four-piece packs. Again, these were based on the Breakfast variant of the Burger Buddies, the Breakfast Buddies. The original did not have the cheese sauce.
- Angus mini-burgers are the British version, sold only as a kids meal and made with ketchup as the only topping. It was originally sold in a six-piece "share pack" with two sandwiches as burgers, two as cheeseburgers and two as bacon-cheeseburgers.
