= Cassino (disambiguation) =

Cassino is a comune in the Province of Frosinone, Lazio, Italy. Cassino may also refer to:

== Places ==
- Monte Cassino, a mountain near the commune of Cassino, Italy
- Praia do Cassino, a beach in the State of Rio Grande do Sul, Brazil

== Arts, entertainment, and media ==
- Cassino (band), an American band
- Cassino (card game), an English card game

== Organizations ==
- A.S.D. Cassino Calcio 1924, Italian football club based in Cassino, Lazio region. Formerly known as "A.S.D. Nuova Cassino Calcio 1924". Their predecessor was known as "S.S. Cassino 1927"

== See also ==
- Casino (disambiguation)
