= Casino Royale =

Casino Royale may refer to:

- Casino Royale (novel), the first James Bond novel by Ian Fleming
  - "Casino Royale" (Climax!), a 1954 television adaptation of Fleming's novel for the series Climax!
  - Casino Royale (1967 film), a James Bond film parody starring David Niven and Peter Sellers
    - Casino Royale (1967 soundtrack), the soundtrack of the 1967 film
  - Casino Royale (2006 film), a James Bond film starring Daniel Craig
    - Casino Royale (2006 soundtrack), the soundtrack of the 2006 film
- Casino Royale Goa, a casino in Goa, India
- Casino Royale Hotel & Casino, a hotel and casino on the strip in Las Vegas, United States
- Casino Royale, site of the 2011 Monterrey casino attack, a massacre that killed 52 in Mexico
- "The Royale", season 2, episode 12 of Star Trek: The Next Generation featuring the namesake casino

== See also ==
- Camino Royale, 2023 novel by Paul Howard in the Ross O'Carroll-Kelly series
