= Indianapolis White Castle =

- Indianapolis White Castle #3
- U.S. National Register of Historic Places
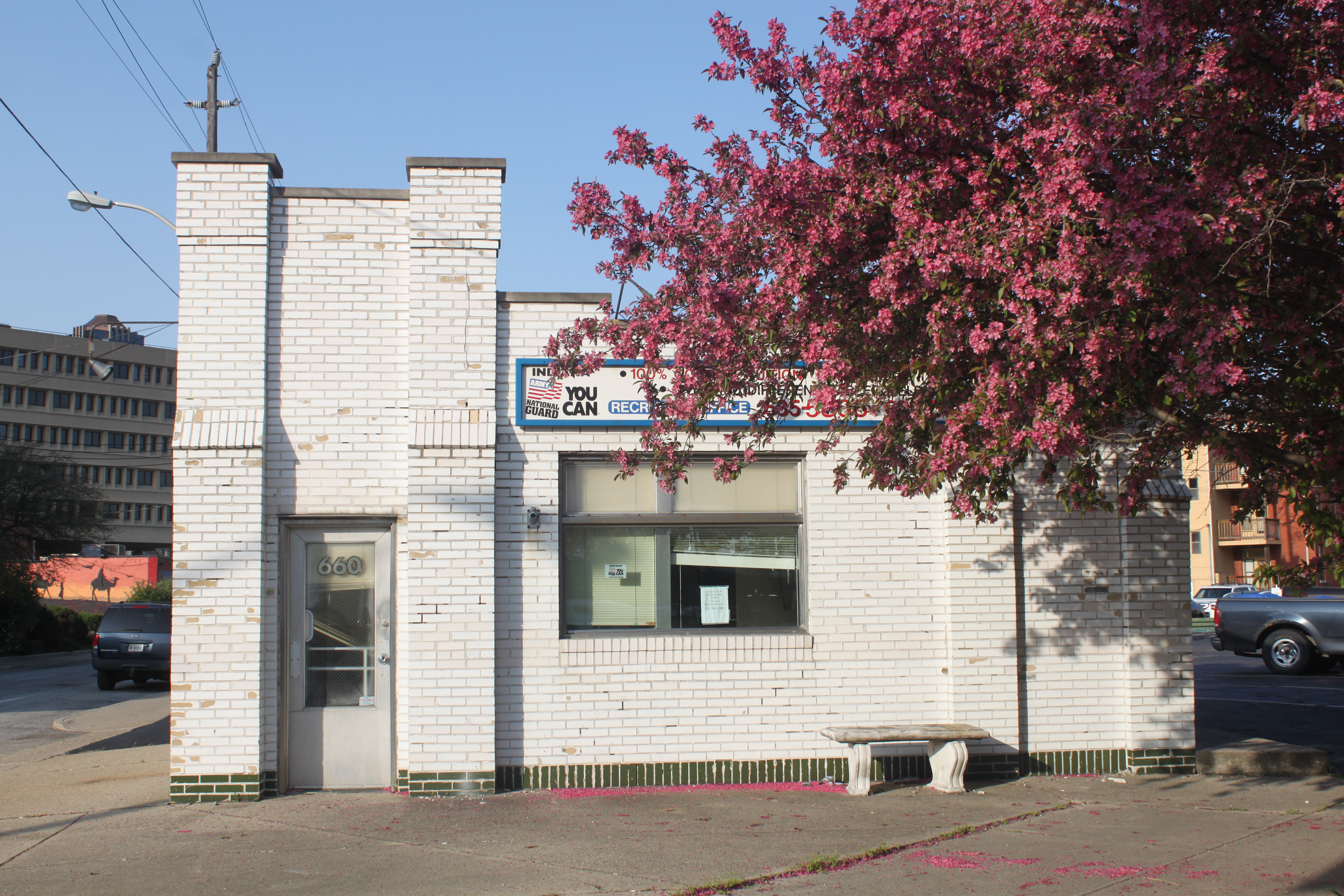
- The building in April 2015

- Location within Indianapolis Location within Indianapolis Location within Indiana Location within the United States
- Location: 660 Fort Wayne Avenue; Indianapolis, Indiana; United States
- Coordinates: 39.7766°N 86.1545°W
- Built: 1927
- Architect: Lloyd W. Ray
- Architectural style: 20th century functional
- NRHP reference No.: 11000385
- Added to NRHP: June 23, 2011

The Indianapolis White Castle #3 was built in 1927 and is located on Fort Wayne Avenue in Indianapolis, Indiana. The building is the third oldest still standing restaurant building from the White Castle hamburger chain in the United States, and the oldest White Castle building in Indiana.

== Architecture ==
The Indianapolis White Castle #3 composed of white enamel-glazed brick, a unique feature that can be found only on White Castle buildings constructed between 1924 and 1929. The building also features many castle elements including battlements, buttresses on the front façade, and a corner tower.

== History ==
Built in 1927, Indianapolis White Castle #3 was originally smaller than its current size with only a small counter bar and stools for customers inside. The building underwent interior renovations in the 1930s and exterior renovations in the 1950s. During a 1950s renovation, an addition was added to the southwest elevation to better serve carryout patrons. The Indianapolis White Castle #3 was listed on the National Register of Historic Places in 2011 for both its architecture and its contribution to American society during the fast food revolution. The building operated under the fast food chain from 1927 to 1979 and was the longest operating fast food restaurant in the country.

== See also ==
- National Register of Historic Places listings in Center Township, Marion County, Indiana
- White Castle Building No. 8
