= White Castle Building No. 8 =

- U.S. National Register of Historic Places
- Minneapolis Landmark
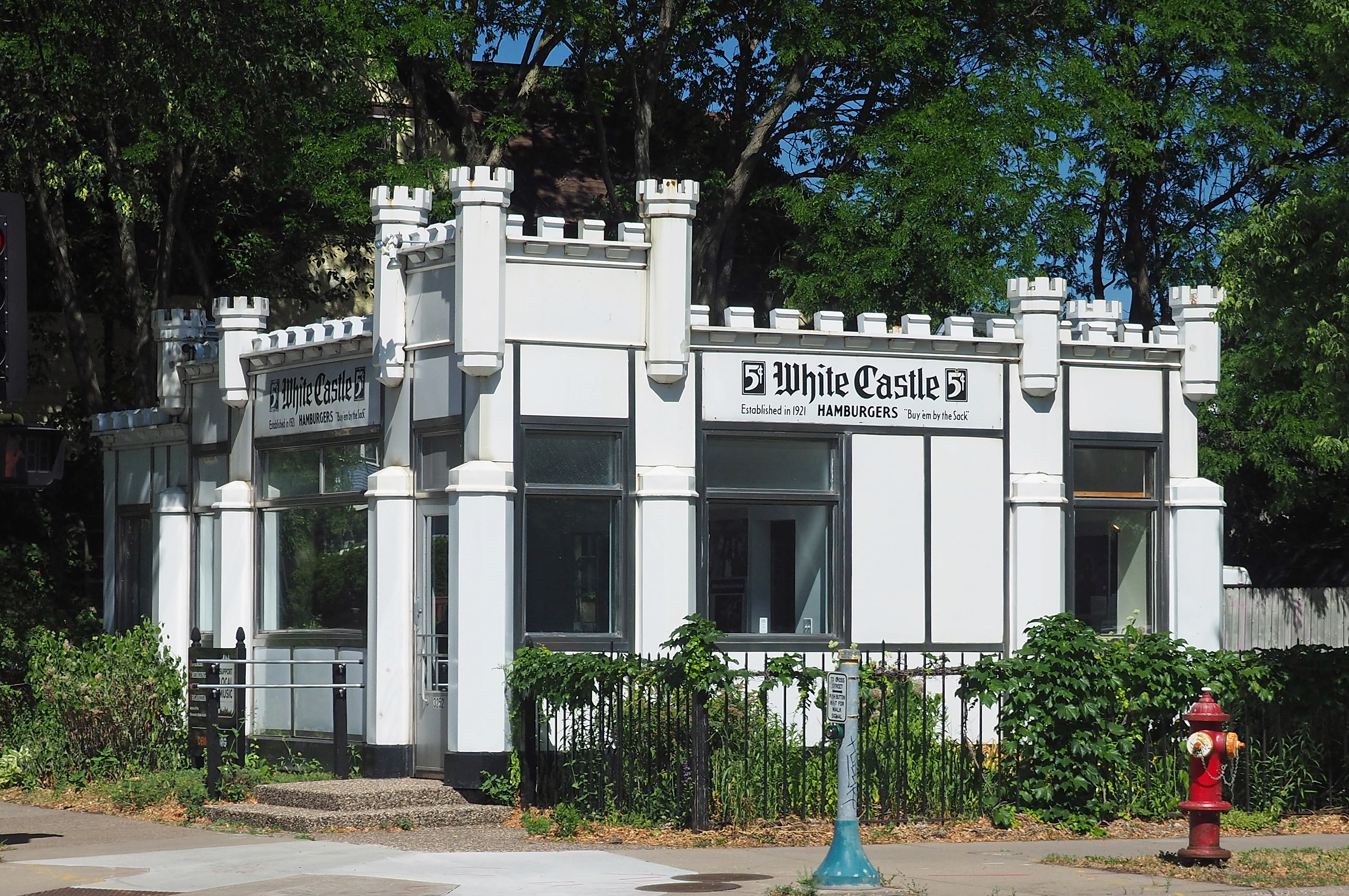
- White Castle Building No. 8 from the southeast
- Location: 3252 Lyndale Avenue South, Minneapolis, Minnesota
- Coordinates: 44°56′35″N 93°17′18.3″W
- Built: 1936
- Architect: L. W. Ray
- NRHP reference No.: 86002868

Significant dates
- Added to NRHP: October 16, 1986
- Designated MPLSL: 1984

White Castle Building Number 8 is a former White Castle restaurant building in Minneapolis, Minnesota, United States.

The building, measuring only 28 by 28 feet (8.5 m × 8.5 m), has had three locations in Minneapolis. The restaurant was originally located at 616 Washington Avenue Southeast near the University of Minnesota campus (in the Stadium Village neighborhood) in 1936. In 1950, the building was moved to 329 Central Avenue Southeast (operating as #16 at this location) when the owner of the Washington Avenue property refused to renew the lease. In 1983, White Castle officials opened a new, larger restaurant a few blocks away from the Central Avenue location.

In order to save a piece of the city's architectural history, the Minneapolis Heritage Preservation Commission found a buyer willing to relocate the structure and save it from demolition. The building is now located at 3252 Lyndale Avenue South, and was added to the National Register of Historic Places in 1986.

== History ==
In 1926, White Castle entered the Minneapolis area. The eighth restaurant in the Minneapolis area was built in 1927 at 616 Washington Avenue Southeast, originally with glazed brick. As the restaurant chain expanded, they developed standardized production methods and a standard look for their restaurants.

Porcelain Steel Buildings, a subsidiary of White Castle, manufactured movable, prefabricated structures that could be assembled at any White Castle restaurant site. This design was built on the Washington Avenue site in 1936, replacing its 1927 building. The 1936 building is modeled after the Chicago Water Tower, with octagonal buttresses, crenelated towers, and a parapet wall. The founders later claimed that this design was the first successful use of porcelain as a building material. The success of the White Castle building method spurred other Wichita-area entrepreneurs to manufacture portable steel buildings as well.

By 1950, the landowner of the Washington Avenue property refused to renew the lease. The reluctance of landowners to extend leases on small parcels was the reason why White Castle manufactured movable buildings. The chain moved the restaurant to the corner of Central Avenue and Fourth Street Southeast. However, by this time the company had failed to notice the population shift from central cities to suburbs, and it spent more time trying to survive in urban neighborhoods instead of building larger buildings in the suburbs. The company eventually recognized the business potential of building larger restaurants in the suburbs. However this meant that the smaller, older castle buildings became obsolete. In 1983, the company built a new restaurant in northeast Minneapolis. Historic preservation efforts succeeded, and the old building was moved to its present location in 1984 and has since housed a contracting firm, an accordion and jewelry business, and an antique/vintage goods shop.

Usually properties on the National Register of Historic Places lose their designation if they are moved or significantly altered, but the National Register recognized that early White Castle restaurants were specifically made to be movable.

== Current use ==
The building is currently occupied by a vintage store. Pop singer Billie Eilish visited the store in 2024.

== See also ==
- Indianapolis White Castle
