= Slider (sandwich) =

Small sandwich

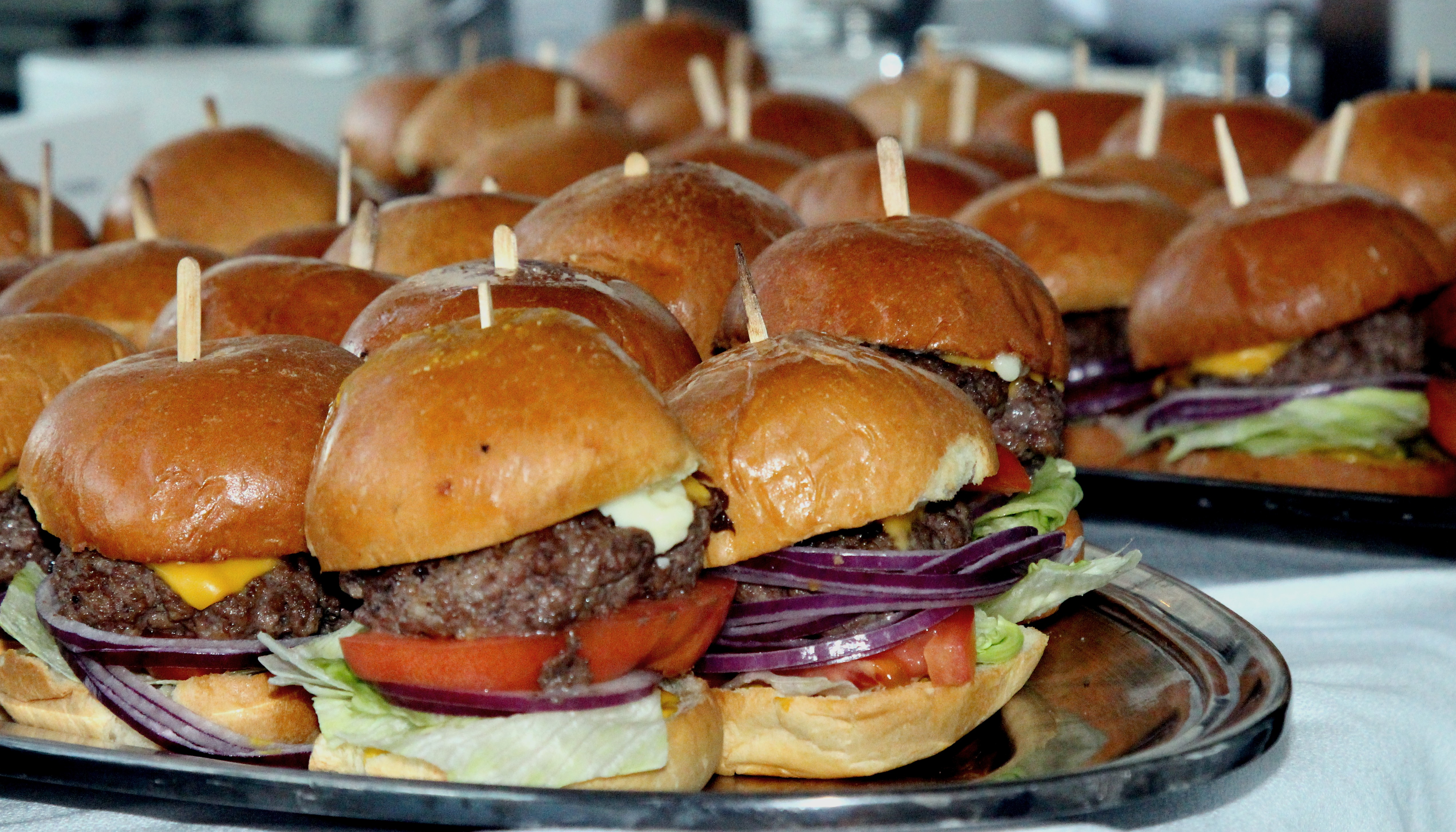
- A party tray of sliders at the Tice House Café in Buena Park, CA in 2015
- Alternative names: Mini burgers, hamburgers
- Type: Hamburger
- Course: Appetizer, amuse-bouche, or entrée
- Place of origin: United States
- Region or state: Midwest
- Created by: Walter Anderson and Billy Ingram
- Serving temperature: Hot
- Main ingredients: Bun (slider roll), filling (e.g. hamburger patty)
- Ingredients generally used: Various cheeses, vegetables, and condiments

A slider is an American term for a small hamburger, typically around 2 inches (5 cm) across, made with a bun or dinner roll. Sliders can be served as hors d'oeuvres, snacks, or entrées. They have become a popular game day appetizer in the United States.

== History ==
The name "slider" is believed to have been first used to describe the onion-steamed small burgers at White Castle restaurants. The term has since been picked up by other restaurants, usually to describe a small hamburger, but sometimes used to describe any small sandwich made with a slider bun. White Castle later trademarked the spelling variant "Slyder" and used it between 1985 and 2009.

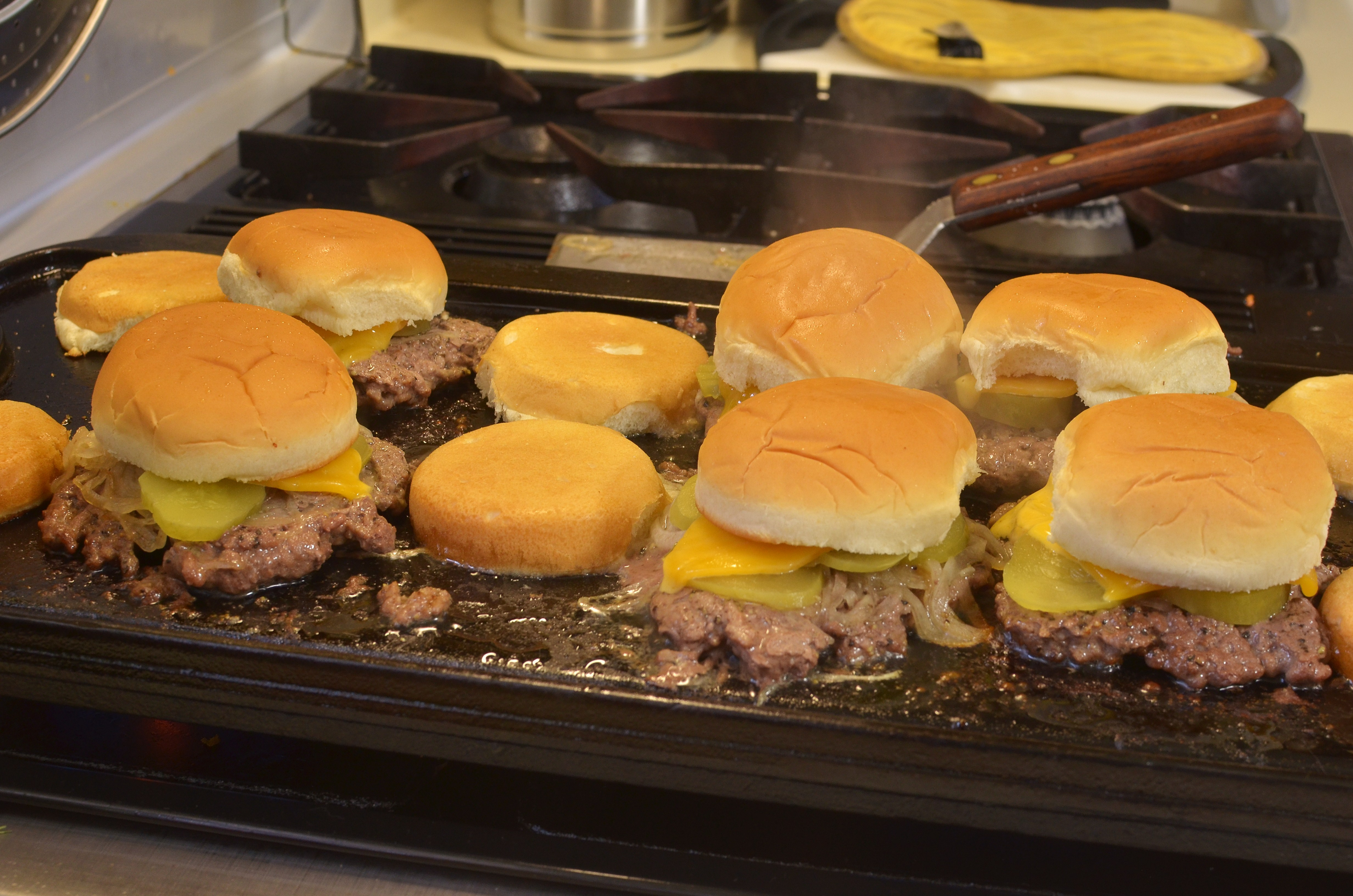
Cheeseburger sliders

== Etymology ==
The etymology of the term slider is uncertain. Food historian George Motz has cited two competing origin stories for the term: that the burgers "slide down your throat", or that White Castle staff would, at a time when food was served on porcelain plates, slide the burgers along the counter to customers seated there. He writes that White Castle "likes both stories" and do not favor one over the other.

== See also ==
- Burger King sliders
- Krystal
- List of hamburgers
