= White Castle (restaurant) =

American fast food restaurant chain

White Castle Management Co.

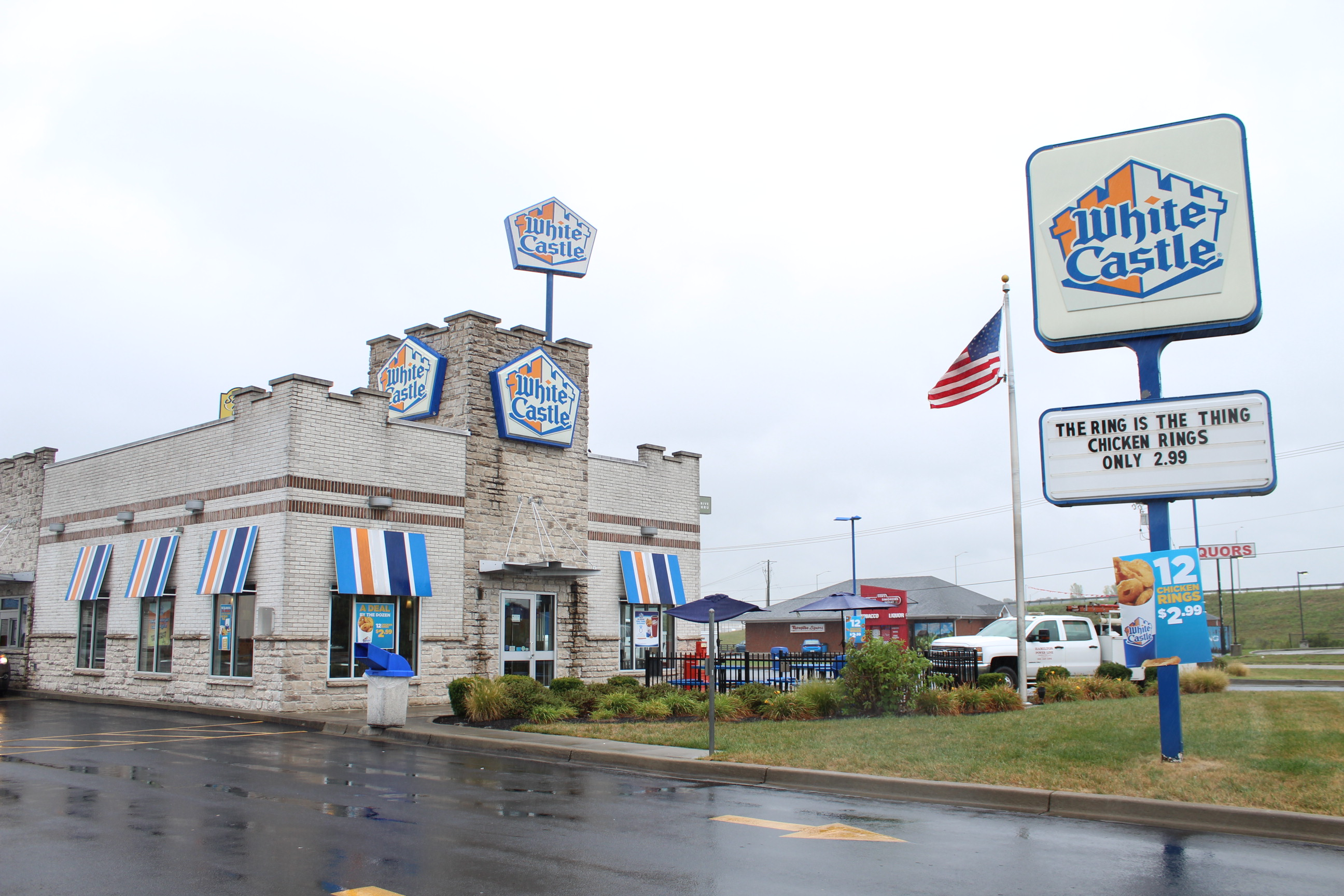
- White Castle in Shepherdsville, Kentucky in 2019
- Trade name: White Castle
- Type: Private
- Industry: Restaurants
- Genre: Fast food
- Founded: September 13, 1921; 105 years ago in Wichita, Kansas, U.S.
- Founders: Billy Ingram; Walter Anderson
- Headquarters: Columbus, Ohio, U.S.
- Number of locations: 345 (2024)
- Areas served: The Midwest; New York metropolitan area; Las Vegas; Phoenix metropolitan area; Orlando metropolitan area; Kansas City metropolitan area (formerly, until 2008); Dallas metropolitan area
- Key people: Lisa Ingram (CEO)
- Products: Sliders, french fries, breakfast, soft drinks, milkshakes
- Revenue: US$ 720.6 million ▲ (2019)
- Owner: Ingram family
- Number of employees: 10,000
- Website: whitecastle.com

White Castle is an American regional hamburger restaurant chain with about 345 locations across 13 states, with its greatest presence in the Midwest and New York metropolitan area. It was founded in 1921, in Wichita, Kansas. White Castle has been generally credited as the world's first fast food hamburger chain. It is known for its small, square hamburgers – commonly referred to as "sliders" – sold at low prices: five cents from their introduction while gradually increasing in price during the 1930s, with promotional coupons in the 1940s, offering five burgers for ten cents. In 2014, Time named the White Castle slider "The Most Influential Burger of All Time". The company's restaurant locations are white buildings decorated with a castle motif.

== History ==
=== Background ===
Walter (Walt) A. Anderson (1880–1963), a cook, had been running food stands in Wichita since 1916, when he opened his first diner in a converted streetcar. After a second and third location, he was looking to open a fourth location when he met Edgar Waldo "Billy" A. Ingram (1880–1966), an insurance and real-estate man, and together they started the White Castle chain.

=== Founding and early activity ===
White Castle was founded 1921 in Wichita, Kansas. Anderson partnered with Ingram to make White Castle into a chain of restaurants and market the brand and its distinctive product. The two men incorporated the business in 1924 and named it White Castle System of Eating Houses Corporation.

Anderson and Ingram started with only $700 for the original White Castle in Wichita, Kansas. The original location was the northwest corner of First and Main; the building is no longer standing.

After the novel The Jungle by Upton Sinclair had been published in 1906 and exposed the poor sanitation practices of the meat-packing industry, many Americans became wary of eating ground beef. The founders set out to change the public's perception of the cleanliness of the industry they were creating. To invoke a feeling of cleanliness, their restaurants were small buildings with stainless steel interiors, and employees outfitted with spotless uniforms. Their first restaurants in Wichita were a success, and the company branched out into other Midwestern markets, starting in 1922 with El Dorado, Kansas.

=== 1925: White Castle Official House Organ, success, expansion and imitators ===
The company also began publishing its own internal employee magazine, the White Castle Official House Organ, circa November 1925 (it was originally named The Hot Hamburger). The bulk of the material was contributed by company personnel and consisted mostly of letters and photographs of workers, promotional announcements, 25-year milestones, retirements, and similar items of interest arranged by geographic area. "Employees could... read about the progress and innovations made by those in other areas which made everyone aware of the entire system's direction and condition." The White Castle Official House Organ was published quarterly at least through the early 1980s, and at some point was renamed The Slider Times. The Ohio History Connection houses an extensive archive of White Castle System, Inc. records from 1921 to 1991, including issues dating from 1927 to 1970 of the White Castle Official House Organ.

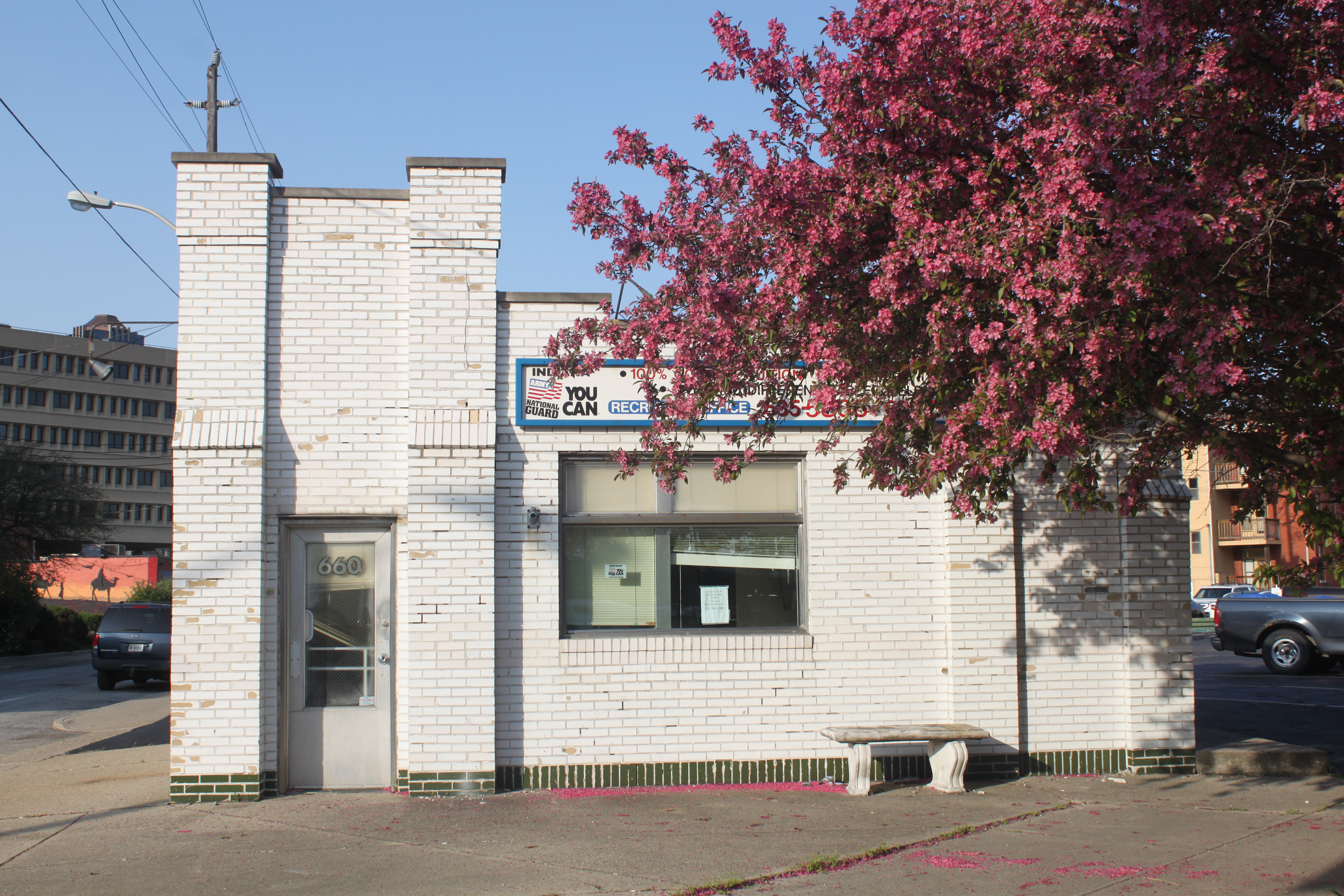
Indianapolis White Castle #3

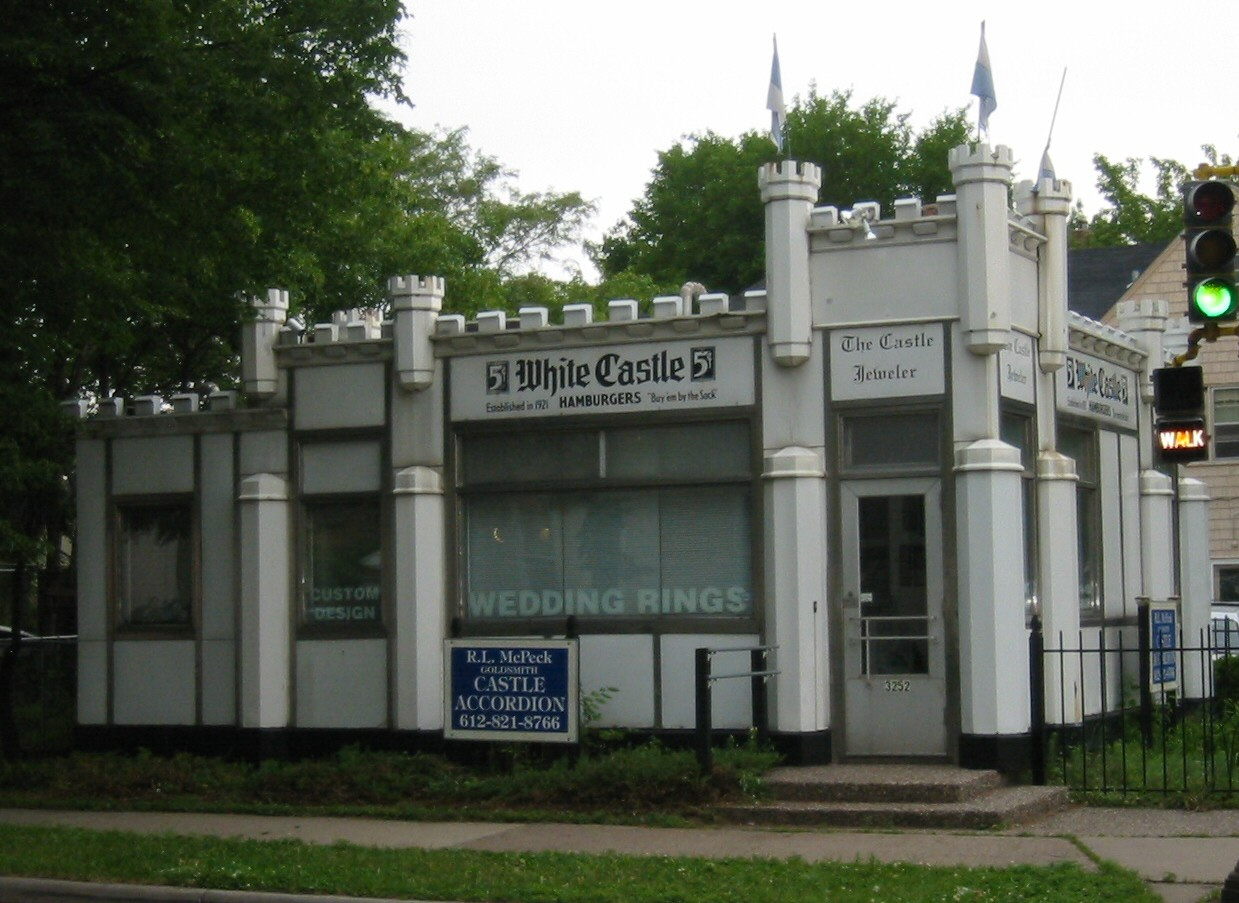
White Castle Building No. 8 in Minneapolis, Minnesota, was built in 1936 to mimic the castle-like features of Chicago's Water Tower Pumping Station and later converted to house an antique shop as of 2006.

The earliest buildings, such as Indianapolis White Castle #3, built in 1927, had exteriors of white enamel-glazed brick and interiors of enameled steel. The Indianapolis unit was in operation until 1979, making it, at the time of its closure, the longest-operating fast food restaurant in the country. The company constructed this style of building from 1924 to 1929. White Castle Building No. 8 in Minneapolis, Minnesota, originally built in 1936 and remodeled, is an example of the chain's buildings with prefabricated white porcelain enamel on steel exteriors. The building measured 28 feet (8.5 m) by 28 feet (8.5 m) and was designed to resemble the Chicago Water Tower, with octagonal buttresses, crenelated towers, and a parapet wall.

The success of White Castle led to numerous imitators. Restaurants copied the distinctive architecture of White Castle buildings, as well as created confusion for consumers by using a similar name. The first of these imitators in Wichita was Little Kastle. Many competitors created their names with a play on the White Castle name. Some restaurant chains just replaced the word "Castle" with their own word (Cabin, Cap, Clock, Crescent, Diamond, Dome, Fortress, Grille, House, Hut, Kitchen, Knight, Log, Manna, Mill, Palace, Plaza, Shop, Spot, Tavern, Tower, Turret, Wonder), while others chose to replace "White" with another color or adjective (Blue, King's, Little, Magic, Modern, Prince's, Red, Royal, Silver). Some of the other imitators included Castle Blanca, Blue Beacon, Blue Bell, Blue Tower, Krystal, Red Barn, Red Lantern, and Klover Kastle. Despite all the competition, few of the competitors were able to match the success of White Castle.

=== 1932: Paperlynen subsidiary ===
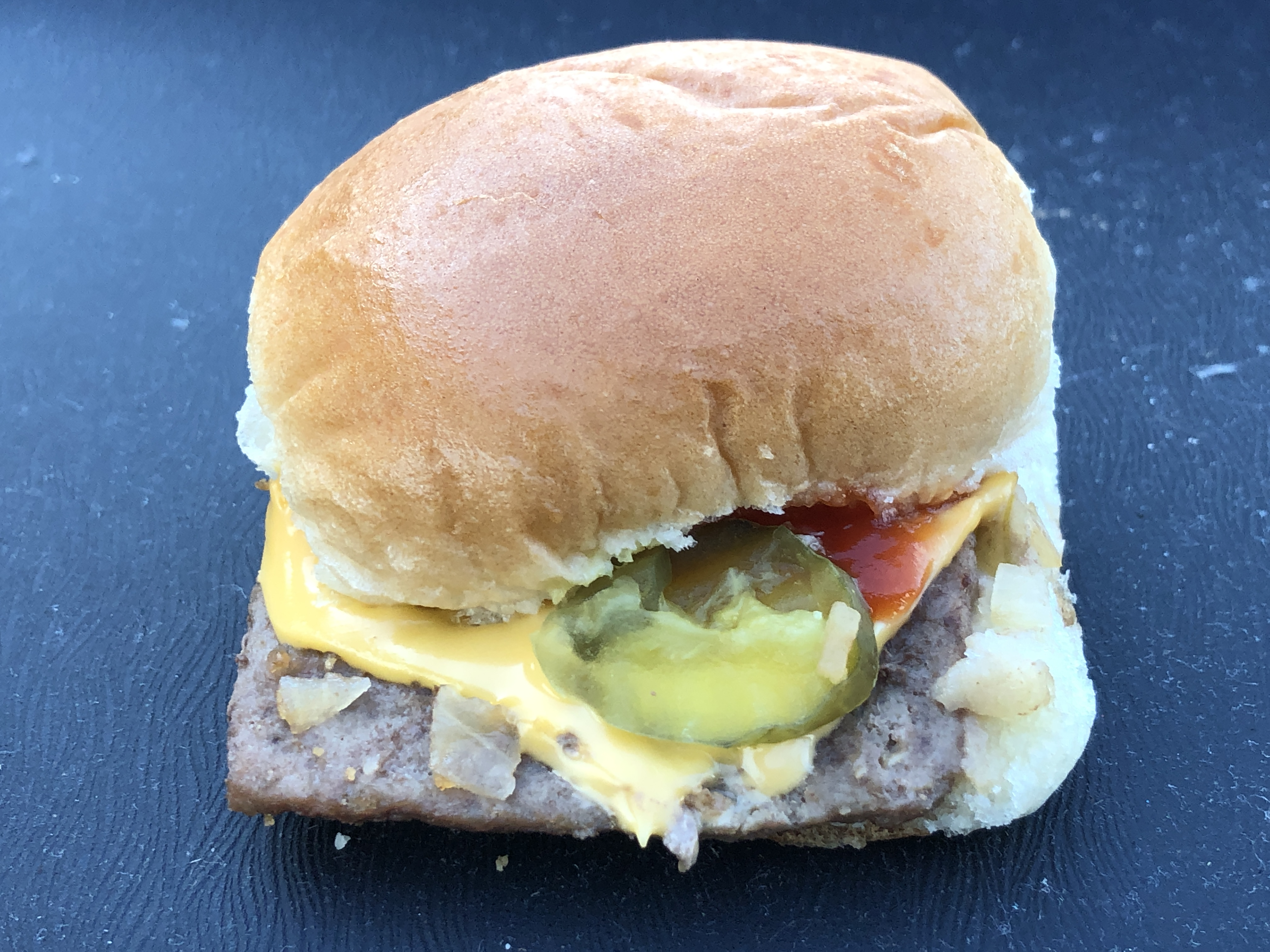
The signature cheeseburger

Since fast food was unknown in the United States at the time of White Castle's founding, there was no infrastructure to support the business, as is common with today's fast-food restaurants. The company established centralized bakeries, meat supply plants, and warehouses to supply itself. It was said that the only things that they did not do themselves were raise the cows and grow their own wheat. Ingram developed a device to produce previously unheard of paper hats (for employees to wear as part of the uniform).

In 1932, Ingram set up a subsidiary, Paperlynen, to produce these hats and other paper products used in his restaurants as well as for many other purposes. At the time, White Castle's distribution stretched from Wichita to New York. Ingram decided the central office should be in the center of the distribution area, and in 1936, relocated the central office to Columbus, Ohio. That same year, Ingram decided to close all of the restaurants in the two smallest-profit markets, Wichita and Omaha.

In 1955, Paperlynen produced over 42 million paper hats worldwide with more than 25,000 different inscriptions.

=== 1934: Porcelain Steel Buildings subsidiary ===
White Castle also created a subsidiary in 1934 named Porcelain Steel Buildings that manufactured movable, prefabricated, steel frame structures with porcelain enamel interior and exterior panels that could be assembled at any of its restaurant sites. This is the first known use of this material in a building design.

=== Buyout of Anderson, headquarters relocation, and expansion ===
In 1933, Anderson sold his half of the business to Ingram, and the following year the company moved its corporate headquarters to Columbus, Ohio. Co-founder Billy Ingram was followed as head of the firm by his son E. W. Ingram Jr. and grandson E. W. Ingram III.

In 1959, White Castle expanded into new markets for the first time since the 1920s. Billy Ingram, who had retired to Miami in 1958, built three White Castle restaurants there. The company closed the Florida operations in 1967 due to inefficient supply distribution.

Throughout its existence, White Castle has been a private company and relied on company-owned stores. It remains privately held today, and its restaurants are all company-owned; none are franchised, except very briefly in Japan during the 1980s and more recently in China since 2017.

=== Location expansion, plant-based meat sliders, automation ===
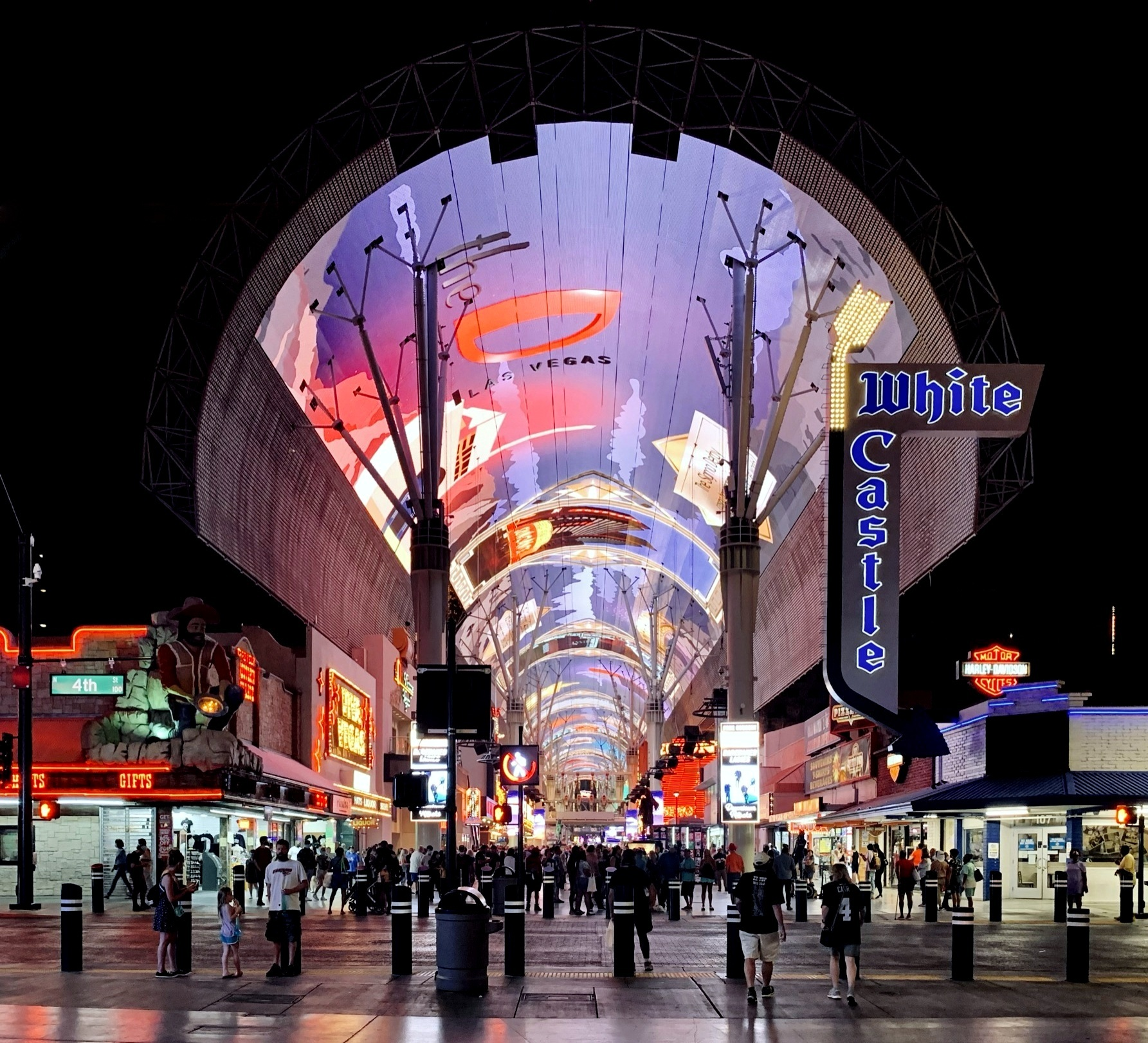
White Castle restaurant at the Fremont Street Experience in Las Vegas, Nevada in 2021

The first White Castle in the far western United States opened at the Casino Royale Hotel & Casino on the Las Vegas Strip on January 27, 2015. This was the first expansion for White Castle into a region outside the Midwest and Northeast in 56 years. On the first day of business, demand for food was so great that the restaurant had to temporarily close for two hours to restock. White Castle Vice President Jamie Richardson said that the store sold 4,000 sliders per hour in its first 12 hours. He was not aware of any similar closing due to unexpected demand in White Castle's 94-year history. A second White Castle location opened in Las Vegas in September 2017 on Fremont Street, a third opened in Jean at the Terrible's Road House in October 2018, a fourth location on Paradise Road in December 2019, and a fifth location in Henderson in June 2022. The Royale Hotel and Henderson locations were closed on March 30, 2026.

In September 2015, White Castle began to offer Veggie Sliders with dairy-free buns to provide a vegan option.

In December 2015, White Castle announced that chief executive officer (CEO) E.W. "Bill" Ingram III would step down at the end of the year, but continue to be chairman of the board. His daughter, Lisa Ingram, then became the fourth CEO of the company.

In 2018, White Castle began offering plant-based meat Impossible Burgers designed to closely mimic the flavor and texture of beef burgers.

The first White Castle location in Arizona opened in Scottsdale on October 23, 2019. A second location opened in nearby Tempe on November 28, 2023. In June 2024, a third Arizona location opened in Goodyear.

White Castle announced on November 25, 2019, that the chain would return to Florida after previously leaving the state in 1968, with plans to open the first restaurant in Orlando. A ghost kitchen, operated out of the restaurant while it was under construction, overloaded Uber Eats when it opened for one day on February 24, 2021. The Orlando location opened on May 3, 2021. It is the world's largest White Castle, located on Daryl Carter Parkway off Interstate 4. The opening coincided with White Castle's 100th anniversary.

In 2020, White Castle began testing an automated cooking robot called Flippy in a number of its Chicago-area stores, and then equipped a larger number of locations with the updated Flippy 2 model in November 2021. The system is able to discriminate amongst burgers, chicken fingers, and french fries, pick them up, cook them through automated temperature detection and flipping action, place the cooked item in a fry basket, and in turn place the basketed food in an area for holding hot items. The Flippy 2 model can operate without human intervention and produce 60 baskets of food per hour. By the end of 2022, a third of White Castle locations were expected to be equipped with the device.

In August 2025, White Castle announced it would open its first location in Texas in the northern Dallas suburb of The Colony. The restaurant is scheduled to open in 2026 in a mega retail and restaurant development known as Grandscape.

== Activities ==
=== United States ===
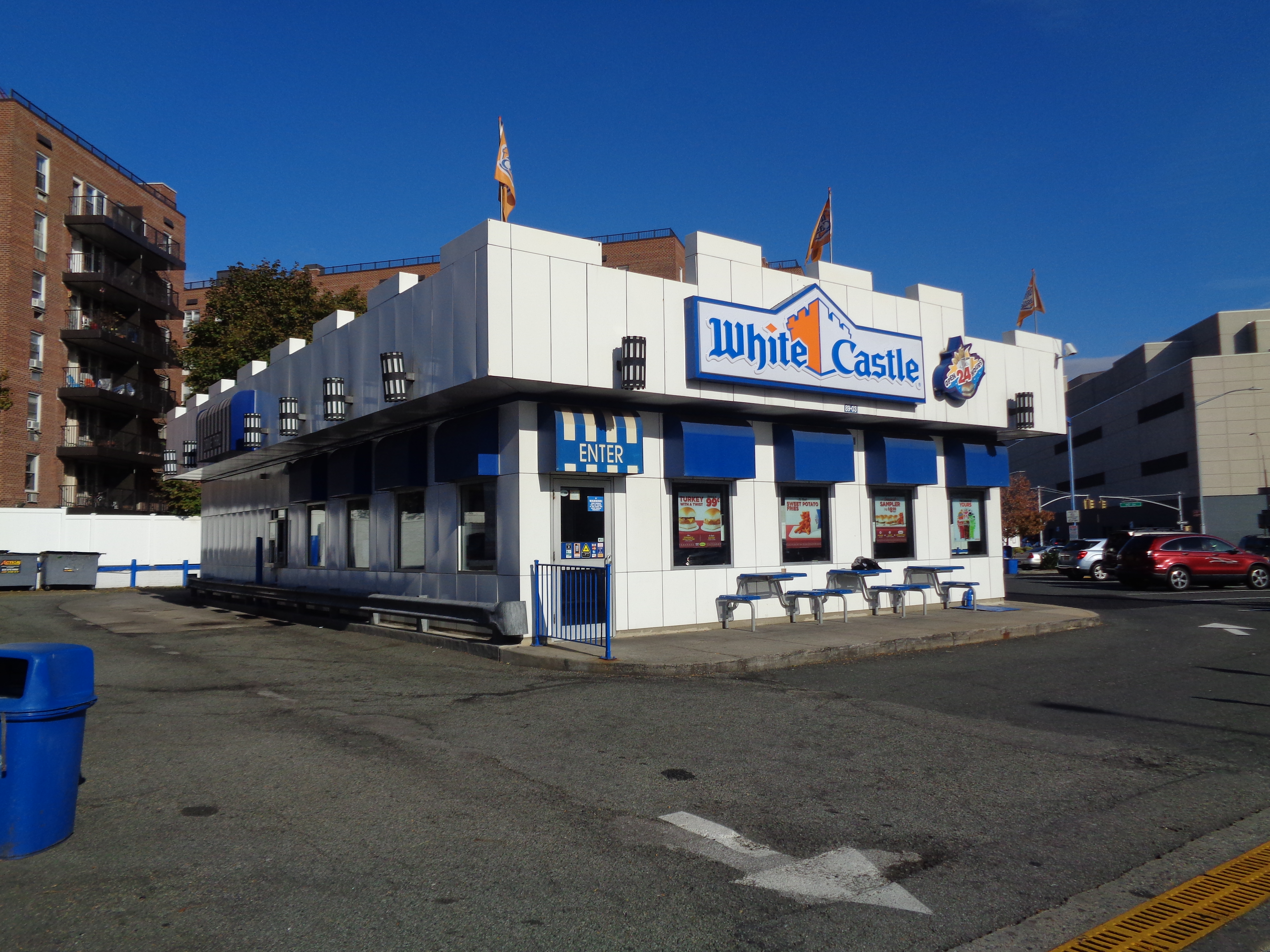
White Castle restaurant in the New York City borough of Queens in 2017

The Ingram family's steadfast refusal to franchise, take on debt or offer shares to the public throughout the company's existence has kept the chain relatively small, with a more discontinuous geography than its principal competitors. There are currently 345 White Castle outlets, as of May 17, 2024, predominantly in the Midwest, Kentucky, and Tennessee. The exceptions are over 50 White Castle locations in the New York—New Jersey metropolitan area (as of 2025), four locations around Las Vegas, Nevada, four in the Phoenix metropolitan area in Arizona, one in Orlando, Florida, and two in Shanghai, China. By comparison, there are over 36,000 McDonald's locations globally, with approximately 14,000 of those in the United States. The chain does, however, sell frozen sliders at supermarkets nationwide, with availability varying by chain.

White Castle currently has locations in the following metropolitan areas in the United States:

- Chicago, Illinois (includes Kenosha, Wisconsin)
- Clarksville, Tennessee
- Cincinnati, Ohio
- Columbia, Missouri
- Columbus, Ohio
- Dayton, Ohio
- Detroit, Michigan
- Indianapolis, Indiana
- Las Vegas, Nevada
- Lexington, Kentucky
- Louisville, Kentucky
- Minneapolis–St. Paul, Minnesota
- Nashville, Tennessee
- New York – New Jersey (includes Allentown, Pennsylvania)
- Orlando, Florida
- Phoenix, Arizona (no locations in Phoenix proper)
- St. Louis, Missouri

Louisville and Columbus also house bulk-manufacturing (grocery-store sales, meat, and bun production) divisions. Company headquarters and the Porcelain Steel Buildings division are in Columbus, Ohio.

In the late 20th century, White Castle tried expanding into three new cities, Philadelphia, Kansas City, and Cleveland-Akron. Those restaurants closed within several years. After a several decade hiatus, the company returned to the Kansas City area in 1985 only to leave again in 2001. White Castle entered the Cleveland-Akron area in 1987 and then exited in December 2014.

=== International activities ===
Since 2021 when its restaurants in China closed, White Castle does not currently have any restaurants outside of the continental United States.

Through franchise deals with local corporate business partners, White Castle briefly had restaurants outside of the United States in Singapore, Malaysia, and Japan during the late 1980s and early 1990s, but the concept never caught on in those countries. During the same time period, White Castle also tried to establish franchised operations in Mexico and South Korea, but these restaurants also failed. The lone Korean restaurant in Seoul was quietly closed by 1993.

In 1986, White Castle opened its first Japanese restaurant in the city of Osaka via a franchise deal with a Japanese company. There are no reliable records that show when this location closed. By the end of 1986, the Japanese franchise had six restaurants with a seventh opened by the following year.

In June 1989, White Castle and its local franchise partner Innovest Bhd. opened seven restaurants in Malaysia. Innovest franchise territory included Malaysia and Singapore, and the company had plans to open three more restaurants by the end of the year, with the possibility of having a total of 20 restaurants within its two country region by the following year.

The first White Castle franchised location in Mexico opened in Mexico City in 1996, but it also closed after a brief trial run.

In 2017, White Castle opened its first and second restaurants in China in the city of Shanghai through a partnership with Shanghai-based ClearVue Partners. In addition to beef sliders, the Shanghai location also sold a spicy tofu slider and a cherry duck slider, which is smoked duck topped with a sweet cherry sauce. At the time of their openings, these two restaurants were the only White Castle restaurants located outside of the United States. These locations were closed by September 2021.

=== Canada ===
Although White Castle has never opened any restaurants in Canada, Canadians have been able to purchase White Castle hamburgers from the frozen foods section in select Canadian grocery and convenience stores since 2015 and more recently at Walmart. For the production of the 2004 film Harold & Kumar Go to White Castle, a full-size outlet was built in Caledon, Ontario, but it was never commissioned or opened to the local public. The store later reopened as Yuppie's Burger, only to go quickly bankrupt. The site was subsequently converted to an Ultramar gas station.

=== Former international locations ===
- Malaysia – 1989/90
- Japan – 1986
- South Korea – 1993/1994
- Singapore
- Mexico – 1996
- Hong Kong
- Bahamas
- China – 2017–2021

== Products and marketing ==
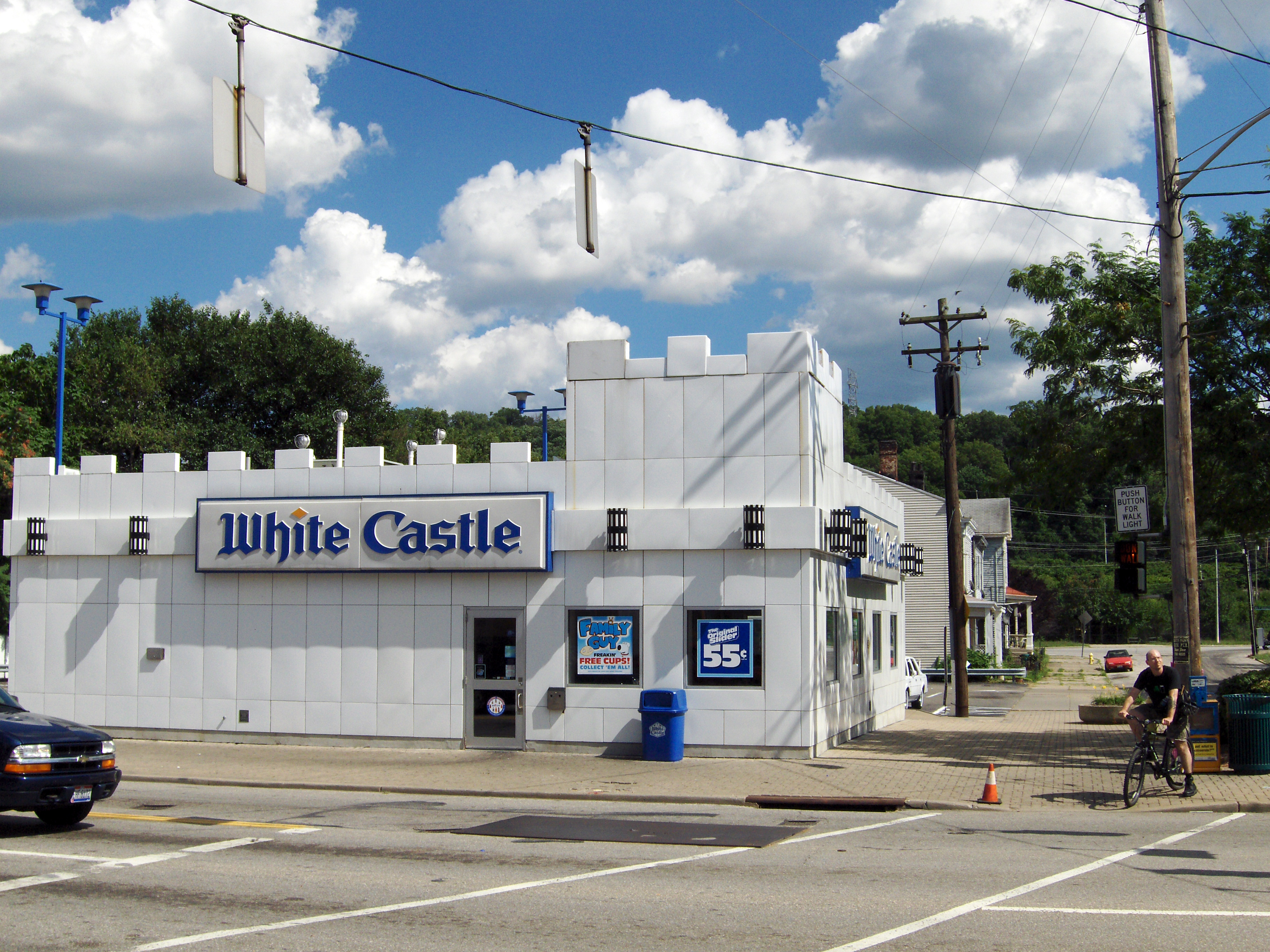
White Castle in Cincinnati, Ohio, the state where the restaurant chain is now headquartered

White Castle also markets its sandwiches in 20 or 30-hamburger boxes, called a Crave Clutch or Crave Case, respectively. The figure of 30 burgers represents the number that can be produced on one of its standard griddles at the same time. A "Crave Crate" is also offered, with the contents being 100 burgers.

To celebrate its 100th year in operation, White Castle re-introduced their original burger, called the 1921 Slider. It features an addition of lettuce, tomato, and caramelized onions. Typically normal sliders have 5 holes in the patty while cooking on a griddle of onions and water to steam the sliders to completion. The 1921 is grilled directly on the griddle instead.

A variety of White Castle products (mostly frozen) are also sold in grocery stores.

Some locations had been cobranded with Church's Chicken until that co-branding arrangement ended around 2010.

Around 2012, White Castle experimented with the Laughing Noodle brand that was to share space with White Castle restaurants. The Laughing Noodle concept was discarded a few years later. The Laughing Noodle brand was developed to offer supplemental variety to a White Castle Restaurant. At least one such location was constructed and operated in Sharonville, Ohio.

Although White Castle originated in Wichita, Kansas, there has not been a White Castle restaurant in Wichita since 1938, making White Castle one of the few restaurant chains that does not have a location in its original city. In addition, there are no White Castle locations in Kansas; while White Castle expanded into the Kansas City market in the early 2000s, which included at least one location in Kansas, those restaurants closed several years later.

In April 2020, White Castle responded to the COVID-19 pandemic by announcing that the chain would be delivering free meals to healthcare workers. White Castle also offered a free dessert in May 2021 to anyone who showed a vaccination certificate. In certain regions, White Castle offered four hours of paid time off for workers who get both doses of an eligible COVID-19 vaccination and presented their vaccination certificate to management.

== Non-traditional sales ==
Due to their limited restaurant locations throughout the United States, White Castle had developed a cult following among former customers who develop a craving for their hamburger in areas not served by their restaurants. By the early 1980s, these customers would go to extreme length to obtain White Castle burgers, such as having friends and relatives ship the burgers to them.

In November 1980, the town officials of Fountain Hills, Arizona, placed an order for 10,000 hamburgers to be sold at a town festival as part of a fundraiser. The following year, the town created an annual festival that was held each May called Midwest Fest or Midwest Festival in which 100,000 or more hamburgers were purchased and sold as part of a fundraiser. By the middle of the decade, several other western cities were purchasing hundreds of thousands of burgers at a time for fundraisers. In 1982, a Dayton disc jockey sent 3,000 burgers to 1,200 U.S. Marines stationed in Beirut.

In late 1982, White Castle established a toll free phone line in which customers can order as few as 50 burgers to be shipped frozen to any metropolitan area in the United States serviced by Federal Express for as low as $57 as part of a program called "Hamburgers to Fly". By early 1983, White Castle was shipping 10,000 hamburgers per week via FedEx.

Based on the success of the sale of hamburgers shipped via air express, White Castle decided to expand their frozen hamburgers distribution by selling the burgers through supermarkets. In May 1986, the company test marketed the concept by selling through grocery stores in Denver and Indianapolis. By the following year, the test was expanded to include Columbus, Ohio, and Portland, Oregon. By 2014, retail sales were eventual expanded to all 50 states with sales conducted through supermarkets, c-stores, vending machines, concessions, military, drug, club, mass and dollar stores.

Frozen White Castle hamburgers became available to Canadians in 2015 through various convenience stores and later became available at Canadian Walmart stores in 2018.

== Impact ==
Anderson is credited with the invention of the hamburger bun as well as "the kitchen as assembly line, and the cook as infinitely replaceable technician", hence giving rise to the modern fast-food phenomenon. Due to White Castle's innovation of having chain-wide standardized methods, customers could be sure that they would receive the same product and service in every White Castle restaurant.

Ingram's business savvy was responsible not only for White Castle's success but also for the popularization of the hamburger. Time ranked the White Castle slider "The Most Influential Burger of All Time" in its January 14, 2014, edition.

The restaurant is a central plot device of the comedy film Harold & Kumar Go to White Castle.

== See also ==
- List of hamburger restaurants
