= Casino (computer virus) =

Computer virus

Malware details
- Type: DOS
- Subtype: COM
- Classification: Virus
- Isolation date: April 1991
- Origin: Malta
- Author: Unknown

Casino, also referred to as disk destroyer by Mikko Hyppönen, is a DOS computer virus that upon running the infected file, copies the File Allocation Tables (FATs) to random-access memory (RAM), then deletes the FAT from the hard disk. It challenges the user to a game of Jackpot of which they have 5 credits to play with, hence the name. No matter if they win or lose, the computer shuts down, thereby making them have to reinstall their DOS. The message it shows when it challenges the user read(s):

DISK DESTROYER - A SOUVENIR OF MALTA

I have just DESTROYED the FAT on your Disk !!

However, I have a copy in RAM, and I'm giving you a last chance

to restore your precious data.

WARNING: IF YOU RESET NOW, ALL YOUR DATA WILL BE LOST - FOREVER !!

Your Data depends on a game of JACKPOT

CASINO DE MALTE JACKPOT

Casino activates on 15 January, 15 April, and 15 August.

Casino was among the classic DOS viruses included in a "Malware Museum", created by Jason Scott of the Internet Archive and Mikko Hyppönen of F-secure in 2016.

== In popular culture ==
In 2021, the virus was referenced in the A Virus, Heartbreak and a World of Possibilities episode of Young Sheldon.

== Sources ==
- "Casino.2330". McAfee Inc.
