= Casino Royale Hotel & Casino =

Hotel and casino in Paradise, Nevada

Best Western Plus Casino Royale
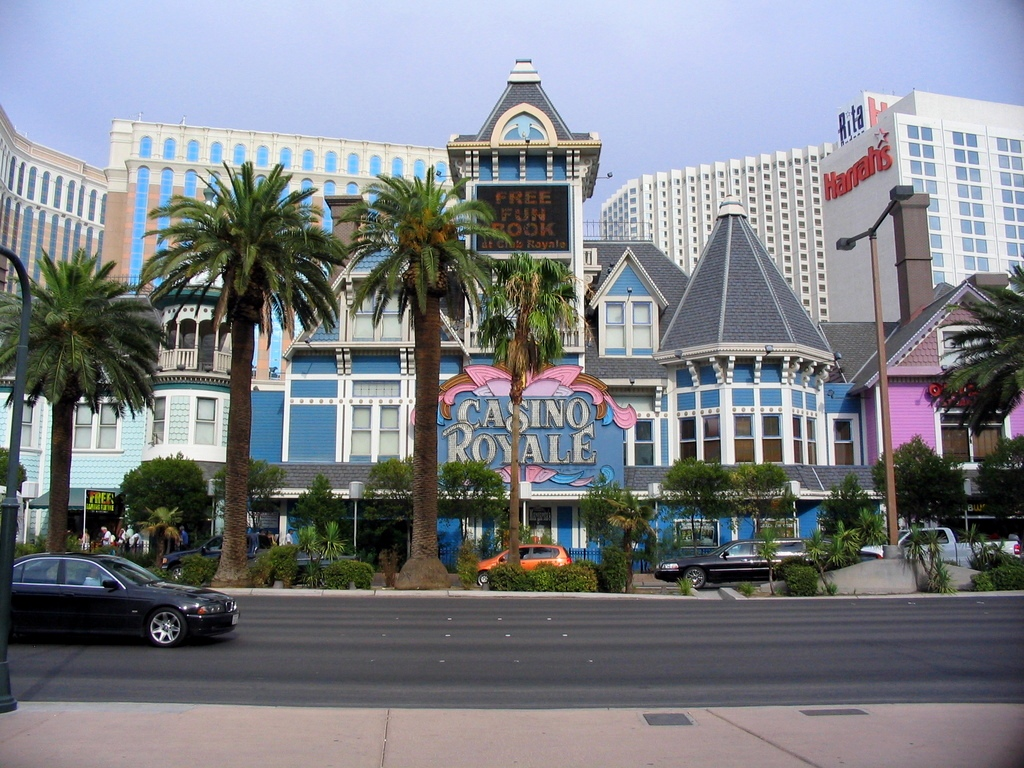
- Façade of casino, 2007

- Location within Las Vegas Strip Location within Nevada
- Interactive map of Best Western Plus Casino Royale
- Location: Paradise, Nevada; 3411 Las Vegas Boulevard S; 36°7′14″N 115°10′18″W
- Opened: July 1978; 48 years ago
- Theme: European
- No. of rooms: 152
- Gaming space: 19,000 sq ft (1,800 m^{2})
- Notable restaurants: Outback Steakhouse; Denny's
- Casino type: Land-based
- Owner: Tom Elardi
- Previous names: Nob Hill Casino; Casino Royale Hotel & Casino
- Renovated in: 1991, 1993–1995, 2014
- Website: casinoroyalehotel.com

The Best Western Plus Casino Royale (formerly known as the Nob Hill Casino and Casino Royale) is a casino and hotel on the Las Vegas Strip in Paradise, Nevada. It is owned and operated by Tom Elardi. The casino, measuring 19,000 sq ft (1,800 m^{2}), caters to low rollers. The hotel includes 152 rooms.

The hotel portion originally opened in 1964, as the Caravan Motor Hotel. The casino portion opened as the Nob Hill in July 1978, and closed 12 years later, reopening as the Casino Royale on January 1, 1992. The hotel became part of the Best Western chain in 2012.

== History ==
=== Nob Hill (1978-1992) ===
Before 1992, this property neighbored the Sands Hotel Casino and contained several motels, restaurants and casinos: Bill's Place, Bon Aire Motel, Motor Inn Motel, Louigi's Charcoal Broiler, and Frank Musso's Restaurant. In the 1960s, a Denny's restaurant was built on the site.

What is now Casino Royale's hotel opened in the spring of 1964 as the Caravan Motor Hotel. The 164-room establishment was developed by local construction firm Heers Bros, Inc. By 1968, the hotel was affiliated with the Travelodge chain and was known as the Caravan Travelodge.

In July 1978, the Nob Hill Casino opened between the Denny's and Travelodge. (Note: The county licensing board approved the Nob Hill's gaming license on June 30, 1978. By July 5, the casino was being advertised as "Now Open".) It was operated by a group of four partners who also owned the nearby Holiday Casino (now Harrah's), led by Claudine Williams. The Nob Hill became famous as a new smaller Strip casino with the lowest Strip limits at table games, including 25¢ craps, 10¢ roulette, and $1 blackjack. In 1983, Holiday Inns purchased the operating business of the Nob Hill, as part of a package deal in which it also acquired full ownership of the Holiday Casino. The Nob Hill closed on November 26, 1990, because the lease on the property expired.

=== Casino Royale (1992-present) ===
Following its closure, the Nob Hill was remodeled by the Elardi family, who also owned the Frontier hotel-casino on the Strip. On January 1, 1992, the former Nob Hill was reopened by Tommy Elardi as the Casino Royale, featuring 10,000 square feet (930 m^{2}) of gaming space with 225 slot machines and 4 table games. Elardi, the general manager and co-owner of the Frontier, purchased the Nob Hill and adjacent hotel for $17 million. From 1993 to 1995, he renovated the property, expanding the casino to 19,000 square feet (1,800 m^{2}) and adding a parking garage. The casino, hotel, and Denny's were connected with a single facade, consisting of Victorian/European-style architecture, giving the appearance of various connected buildings.

From its opening, the Casino Royale was subjected to picketing by members of the Culinary Workers Union because of its shared ownership with the Frontier, where workers had been on strike since September 1991. During 1994, the Elardis planned to build a space probe ride behind Casino Royale. However, the project was scrapped following opposition from the union, as well as nearby resorts, which said the ride would not fit in on the Strip. By 1995, Casino Royale had established a surveillance operation to monitor the picketers as well as its own employees, the latter through listening devices installed in parts of the casino. Picketing continued until 1998, when the strike was resolved by the Elardi family's sale of the Frontier. Casino Royale remains one of the few non-unionized casinos in Las Vegas.

An Outback Steakhouse opened in 2003, becoming the first location inside a casino.

In December 2012, the property was rebranded as part of the Best Western hotel chain. The hotel includes 152 rooms.

In 2014, the Denny's at the north side of the building, which had been the restaurant chain's highest-volume location, was demolished and replaced with a two-story, $9-million addition, with a Walgreens drug store on the ground floor, and a new Denny's on the second floor. The project also added a White Castle burger restaurant, the chain's first location in the Western United States. The chain announced the permanent closure of the outlet, along with its Henderson location, for March 30, 2026.

In August 2023, the FAA approved a 699-foot tall building for the Casino Royale site.

Casino Royale is located at the center of the Strip, between the Venetian and Harrah's resorts.

== Gaming ==
Casino Royale has 19,000 sq ft (1,800 m^{2}) of gaming space, including slot machines, video poker, and video keno. The casino caters to low rollers, and is known for its promotional slot play.

In the late 1990s, Casino Royale had the highest odds in Nevada at craps. The game was a 50 cent minimum bet game, which allowed a player to place 100 times more in the odd bet. It was not uncommon to see 50 cent bets with $25 to $50 odds bets. This was when the rest of the Strip was allowed double to 10 times odds. Around 2004, the Casino Royale became the first casino property on the Strip to install Geoff Hall's blackjack variant, Blackjack Switch. The success of Blackjack Switch at the casino led to the game spreading to many other casinos. In 2016, Casino Royale opened its BarBook, a sports book and bar with two William Hill betting stations.

== In popular culture ==
- The Casino Royale is represented in the 2004 video game Grand Theft Auto: San Andreas as the Royal Casino.
- There is a hidden achievement in the 2007 video game Project Gotham Racing 4 in which the player must take a picture in front of the Casino Royale while in an Aston Martin DBS.

== Gallery ==
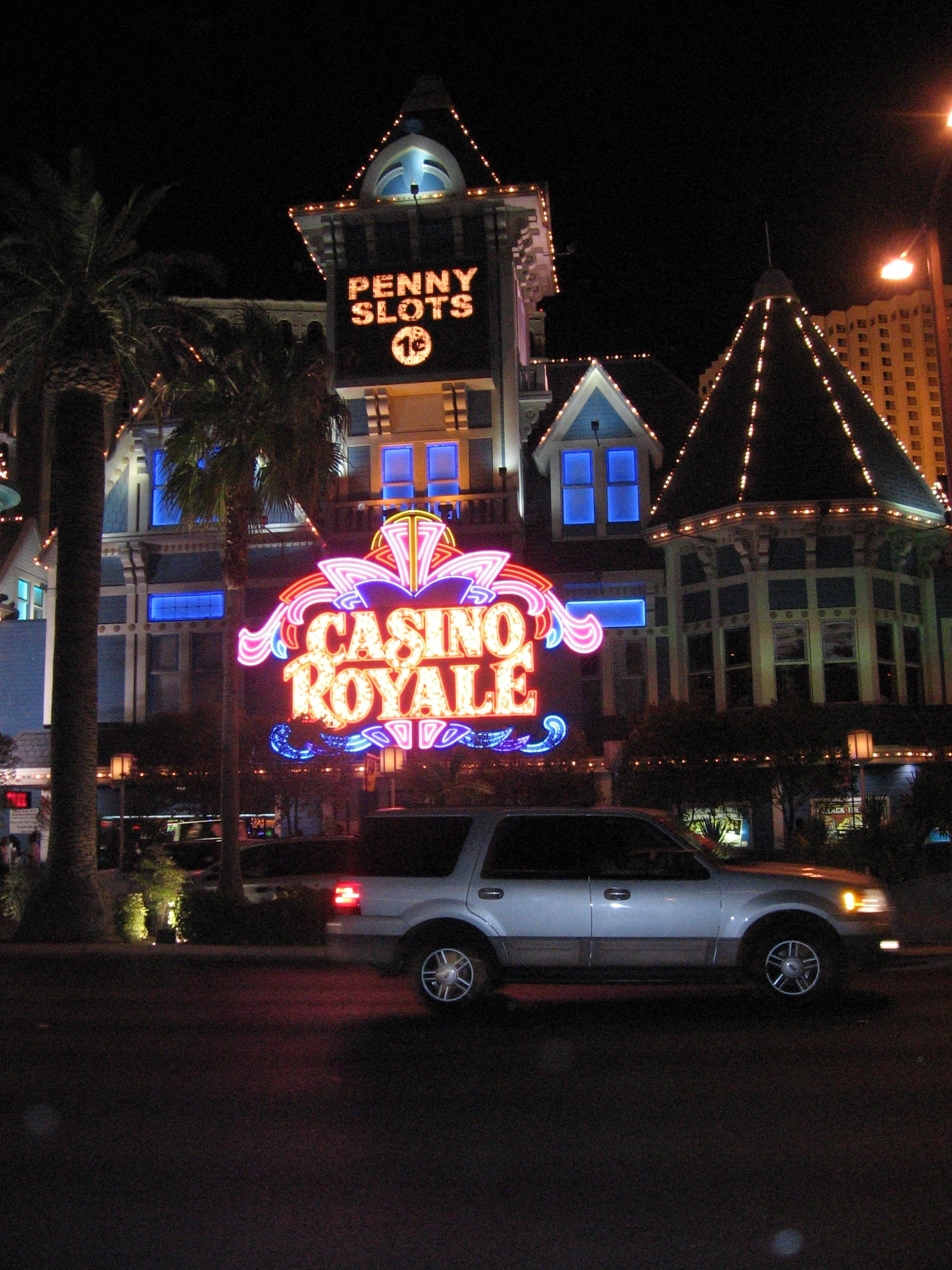
Front of casino at night

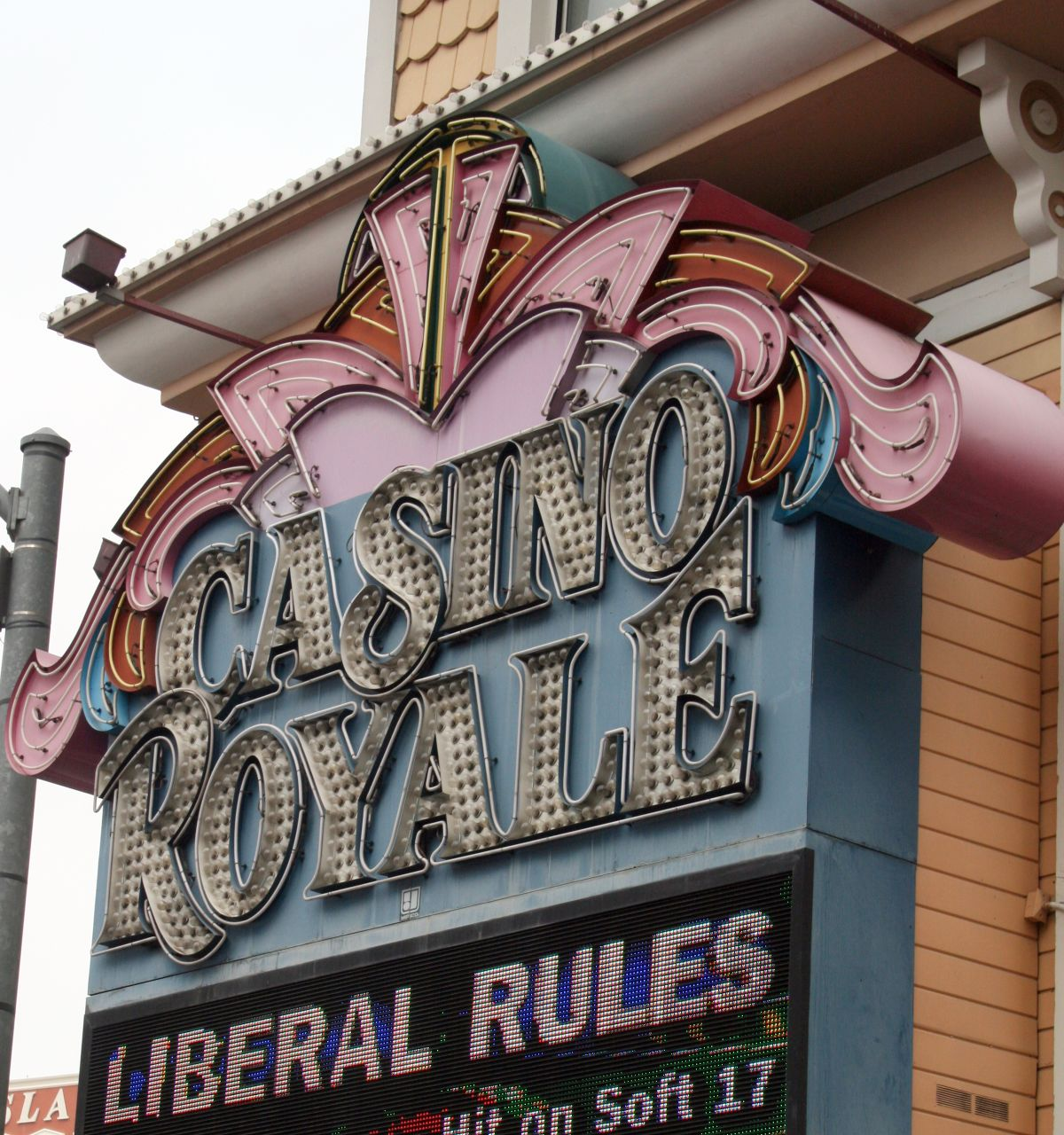
Casino Royale sign, 2008

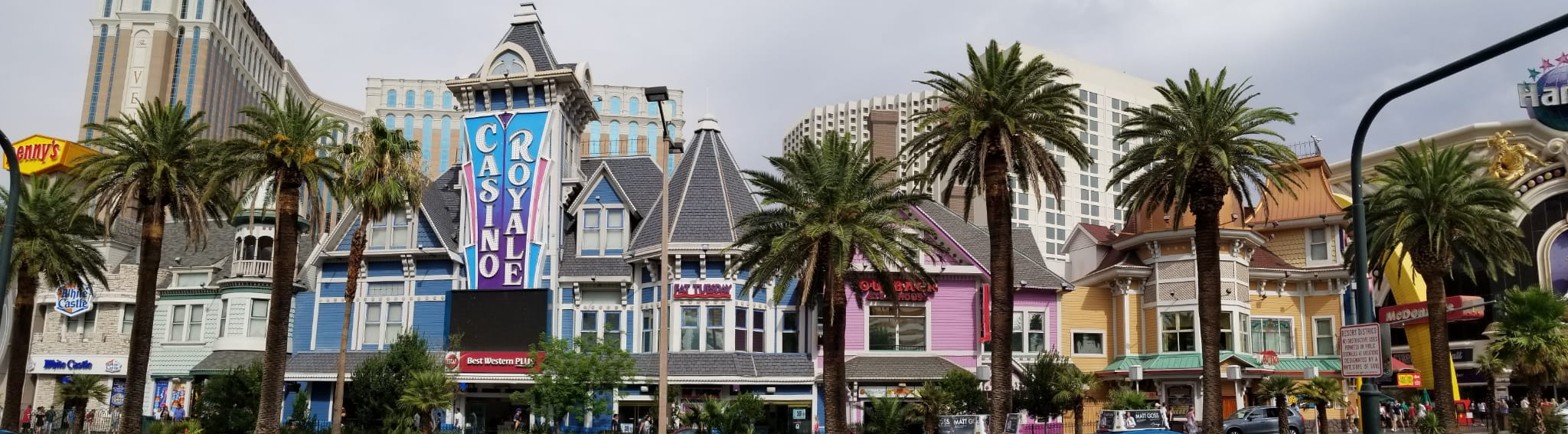
Facade along the Strip

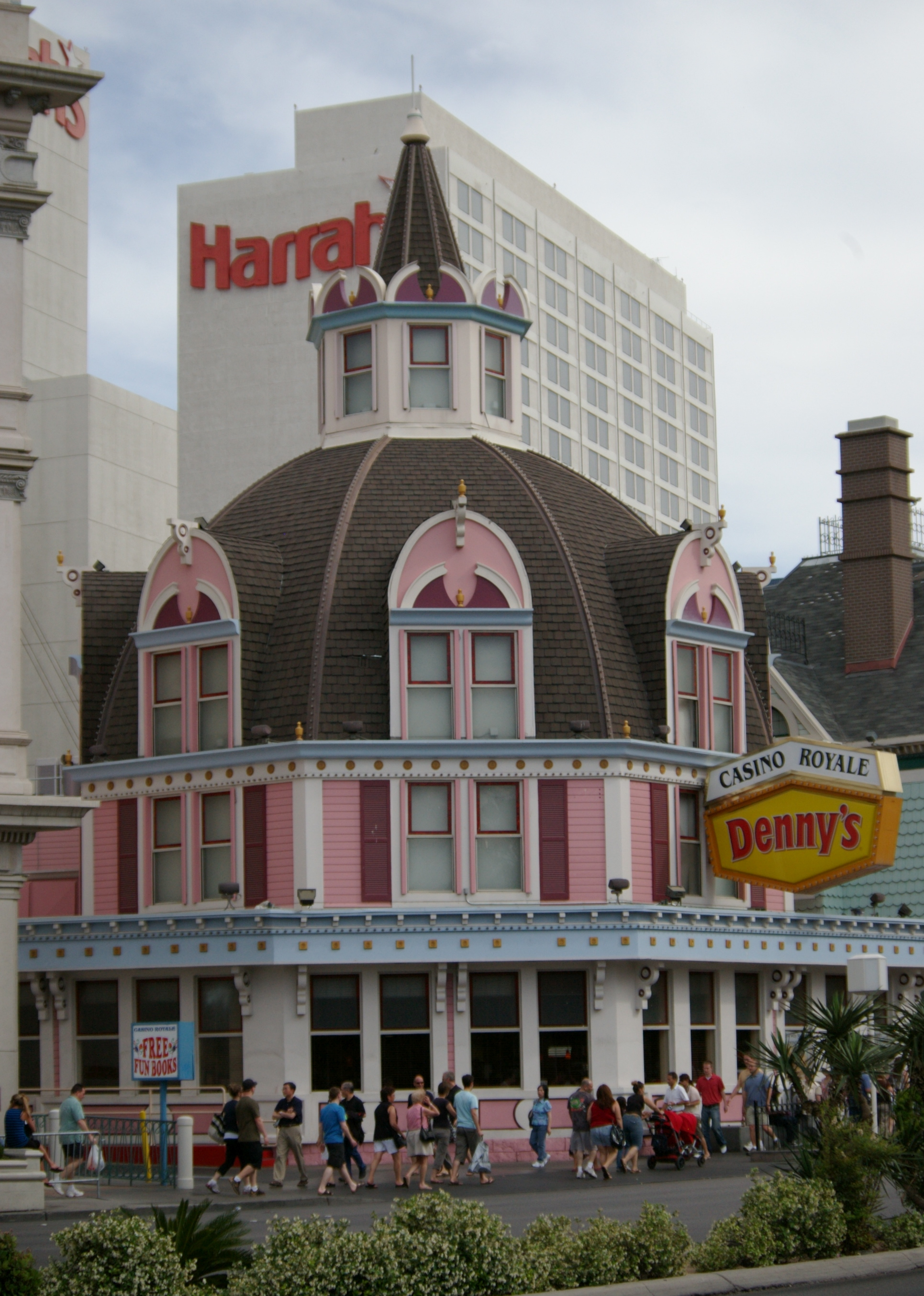
Denny's restaurant, 2009
