= Casino (band) =

British rock band

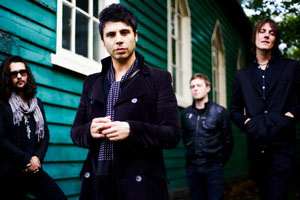
- Casino, with all 4 current members

Background information
- Origin: Birmingham, England
- Genre: Rock/alternative
- Years active: 2001 – 2006; 2006 – 2008 (as SpiderSimpson); 2014 – Present (as Casino)
- Label: Dimmer Twin
- Members: Adam Zindani; Sam Yapp; Jo Crofts; Jimi Crutchley
- Past members: Dean Deavall; Neil Irving

Casino are a British rock/alternative band from Birmingham that was active in the early 2000s. By 2001, the band's songs had been featured on American television shows including The Sopranos and Six Feet Under. A demo tape landed their songs onto the soundtrack of the 2002 film Global Heresy starring Alicia Silverstone and Peter O'Toole, and the band were flown to Toronto to coach the cast on how to look like rock stars.

The band changed its name to Spider Simpson but later changed it back to Casino. Guitarist and singer Adam Zindani left to join the Welsh band Stereophonics, but continued to perform with Casino, which had previously supported the Stereophonics on tour.

== Background ==
The original band consisted of Adam Zindani(vocals/guitar), Sam Yapp (drums), Jo Crofts (guitar) and Jimi Crutchley (bass guitar). The band was originally formed as Casino in 2003 and changed its name to SpiderSimpson after signing to Polydor in 2006, before reverting to the original name in late 2008 to release its first album The Spider Simpson Incident. The band has a strong and loyal cult following in its home city of Birmingham, England. The band was inactive after the departure of Deavall, who has formed a new band (The High Hurts), and with Zindani being more involved with the Stereophonics with little time left to work with Casino. Currently the band are back in business, they've signed a record deal and recently released an album on Spotify.

== Casino (2003–2006) ==
The band played its first home gig at The Railway music bar in Birmingham in September 2003. Soon after, they were approached to submit five songs for a film company – which later became the basis of the soundtrack for the Ultimate Pictures film, Global Heresy, starring Alicia Silverstone and Martin Clunes, ironically depicting the trials and tribulations of an up-and-coming rock'n'roll band. Over the next year, the band went on to build a loyal fan base from the roots up by gigging extensively around the U.K, including support slots with the Stereophonics, which culminated in being invited to open the Stereophonics 2005 UK tour.

During 2005, a self-produced demo caught the attention of the newly formed Midlands-based rock radio station, Kerrang, which decided to playlist the band's song "Lose Myself" during prime time listening hours. The subsequent increase in popularity saw the band continuing to play small local venues and supporting The Suffrajets on their UK tour. "Lose Myself" and "Heavy Metal Machine" were both used for the Gumball 2006 TV show.

== SpiderSimpson (2006–2008) ==
The band signed to Polydor in spring 2006 and changed the name to SpiderSimpson, after a character from a cult film. They recorded what was then going to be their first album at studio 606 in Los Angeles with the producer Nick Raskulinecz. The band has had constant support from Kerrang Radio, local and national fans and has also had radio support from both Dave Grohl of the Foo Fighters and Kelly Jones of Stereophonics. The band were not happy with the original track order of the album and had the recording rejected by Polydor.

In autumn 2006, Casino completed the Kerrang Radio Breakthrough Tour with other newly signed bands, followed by a UK tour in December. In 2007, Zindani became heavily involved with touring with Stereophonics as their live guitarist. In 2008, the future of the band was put in doubt when Deavall began playing keyboards and providing backing vocals live for the Welsh rockers Feeder, and Zindani was made a permanent member of Stereophonics.

== Casino return (2008–present) ==
In December 2008, there were reports online that "Spider Simpson are Dying". However, it was later announced that the band was dropping the SpiderSimpson name and returning to Casino, and that an album had been recorded the previous year. This was a re-recording of the album rejected by Polydor, their management company having bought back the rights to the music. The album was re-recorded on a shoestring budget with the Stereophonics producer Jim Lowe mixing. It was sold at Stereophonics shows but is currently not available anymore.

Entitled The Spider Simpson Incident, the album has some old tracks including those on the original track list and some new. The album was boosted in early 2009, with Kerrang radio playing several songs as well as sold-out shows in Worcester and Birmingham.

In the last quarter of 2009, Deavall, after playing a few one-off shows with Casino, formed the rock band The High Hurts in the role of lead singer and spent most of 2009 recording with them. Deavall left Casino to concentrate on The High Hurts while Zindani has been frequently touring with Stereophonics: as a result, there has seen very little activity with Casino. It has been said that the band still want to continue.

== 2011 ==
In March, Zindani revealed on the band's Facebook page that the band was rehearsing three times a week and had also written new songs. In May Zindani revealed on Kerrang! Radio that the band signed a record deal, they were going to play at Artsfest Birmingham in September and there would be a single out in September. Due to delays the single will be out by the end of 2012, just before the album release. At the beginning of September it was announced Neil would no longer be playing Bass for Casino, standing in for him is Jimi Crutchley, his first show with the band was 9 September at a warm-up gig, prior to their Artsfest performance, at Marr's Bar in Worcester. Jimi is also known as Bassist for Raven Vandelle, a band also from Birmingham. Later that month the band appeared in Rock Sound Presents the Sitcom Soldiers Sessions, In Association With Longwave. In the video the band performs their single 'Fallen'. Also an acoustic version of 'Fallen' was filmed. Since then the band has done several gigs in Birmingham, London and Worcester.

== 2012–2013 ==
On 11 November 2012 the band released their debut single 'Runaway / Rise and Fall' available on iTunes. The band was working on a new album, Zindani revealed it is going to be named 'Heavy Fever'. It was released on Spotify shortly after the release of Runaway/Rise and Fall.
