= Physical Therapy (band) =

- Origin: St. Louis, Missouri, U.S.
- Genres: Jazz fusion
- Years active: 1992–1997
- Label: Sweatshop Records
- Past members: Terrance "Terry" Coleman; Michael Fitzgerald (deceased); Ben Monroe; Brian White

Physical Therapy is a jazz fusion band from St. Louis, Missouri, which featured members, Terrance "Terry" Coleman, Michael Fitzgerald, Ben Monroe and Brian White. The group was active in the 1990s, and produced two albums under the Sweatshop Records label, the first being the self-titled Physical Therapy (1992), and the second work being a theme album called Casino (1997).

== Music career ==
St. Louis native Michael Fitzgerald started playing music in grade school, and had mastered the saxophone, woodwinds, and keyboard by the age of 18. Fitzgerald formed the jazz fusion band Physical Therapy, along with members Terrance "Terry" Coleman, Ben Monroe and Brian White.

In 1992, the band released their self-titled debut album Physical Therapy, under the Sweatshop Records label, and later on released their second, and final album titled Casino in 1997. Both albums were recorded locally in St. Louis, with the first being produced at K Audio Inc., and the second at The Chapel studios. All four members produced each album, with Monroe doing engineering and sound mixing; additionally, both albums contain writeups on the back of the CD's that string together the track titles, in a humorous paragraph related to the general theme of the album.

The band used a variety of instruments and synthesizers, and recorded digitally to maintain a high production standard. Priding the band on the use of real musicians, they boasted on their first album that no drum machines, or music sequencers were used in its production. Later, on Casino, the band solicited guest help from a number of local musicians, who contributed to over half the album. The second album did contain sparse sequencing.

Physical Therapy's music was also featured in the "Local on the 8s" forecast segments on The Weather Channel. The band does not have a website, and other information about the band is difficult to find. Other than Discogs, Physical Therapy is not listed on other music websites such as MusicBrainz; only their second album Casino is listed on AllMusic. The band members are currently still performing, and recording music as session players, and solo performers worldwide. In 2010, Fitzgerald and White both performed at the fifth annual Miles Davis Jazz Festival, at the Lewis and Clark Community College in Godfrey, Illinois. In 2019, Fitzgerald performed solo at the 14th annual Miles Davis Jazz Festival at Jacoby Arts Center in Alton, Illinois.

Fitzgerald died in June 2022, according to a Facebook post by R&B singer Wendell B.

== Personnel ==
- Terrance "Terry" Coleman – Bass, Keyboards, Acoustic Guitar
- Michael Fitzgerald – Soprano, Alto, and Tenor saxophone, and Keyboards
- Ben Monroe – Drums and Percussion
- Brian White – Acoustic Guitar, electric guitar, and MIDI Guitars, and Keyboards
- Kevin James – Keyboards and Vocals (Physical Therapy only)
- Kent McVey – Keyboards (Casino only)
- Mark Owens – Keyboards (Casino only)

== Discography ==
Physical Therapy's "Wishbone"
A 25 second sample of Physical Therapy track 5, "Wishbone".

Physical Therapy's "What the Flush"
A 25 second sample of Casino track 2, "What the Flush".

- 1992: Physical Therapy (Sweatshop Records)
- 1997: Casino (Sweatshop Records)
