= Casino Theatre (Gunnison, Utah) =

- U.S. National Register of Historic Places
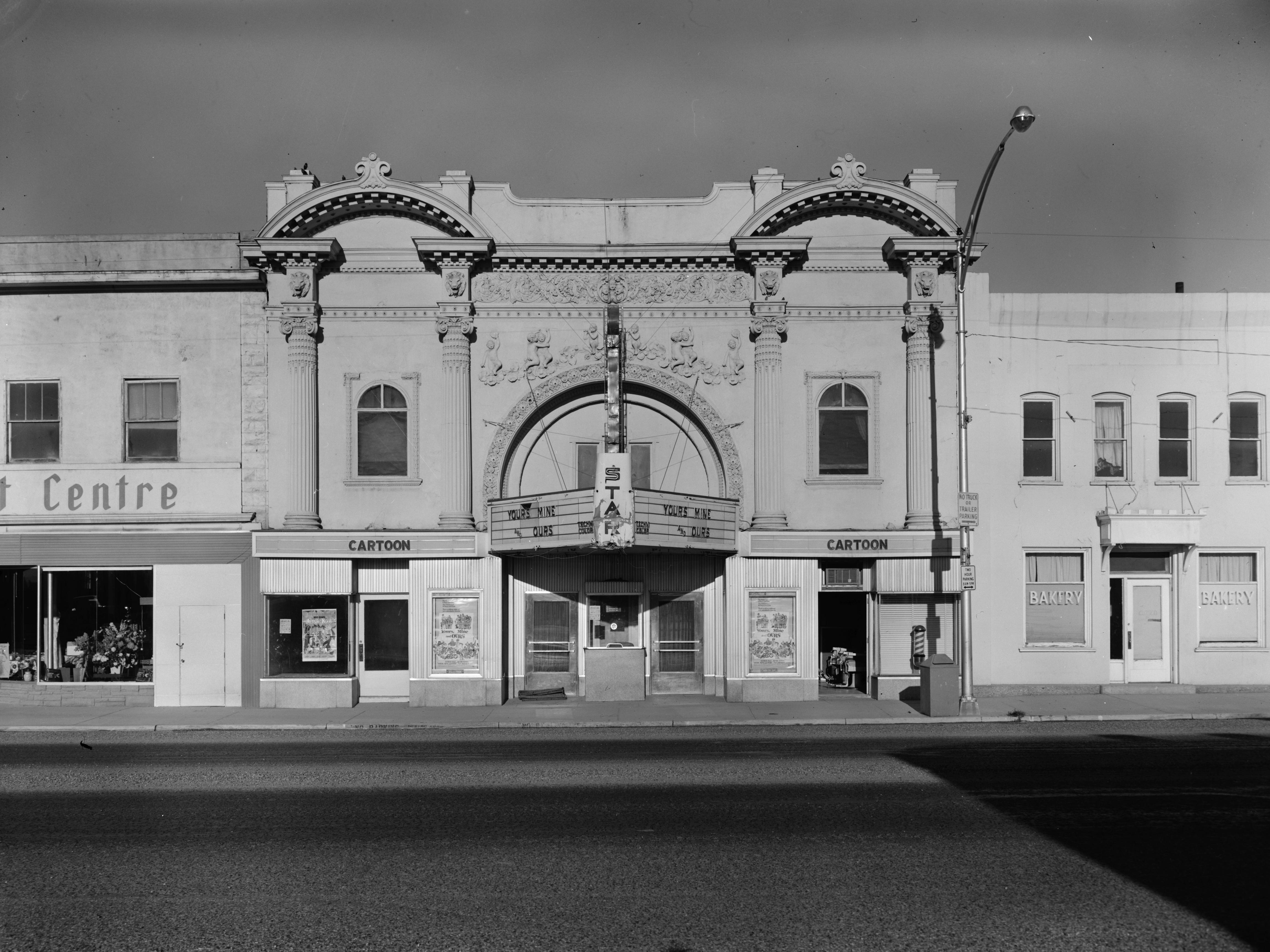
- The Casino Theatre, August 1968

- Location within Utah Location within the United States
- Location: 78 South Main Street; Gunisson, Utah; United States
- Coordinates: 39°9′15″N 111°49′4″W
- Area: 0.2 acres (0.081 ha)
- Built: 1912
- Architectural style: Beaux Arts
- NRHP reference No.: 89001416
- Added to NRHP: September 22, 1989

The Casino Theatre (also known as the Star Theater), is a theater in Gunnison, Utah, United States, that is listed on the National Register of Historic Places. It is the oldest functioning theater in Utah as it was built in 1912. It also featured an underground tunnel which was used to smuggle alcohol during the American prohibition. The tunnel has been sealed recently during renovations, due to safety concerns.

== Description ==
The theater is located at 78 South Main Street (US-89). The Beaux Arts building was constructed in 1912 and is currently undergoing renovations. It was listed on the National Register of Historic Places in 1989.

== History ==
Gunnison entrepreneur Sims M. Duggins built the theater in 1912 as a "big box" as a first step in construction. Duggins had the Beaux-Arts School of Architectural Design in Paris design the façade and hired a Pittsburgh company to build it. Components of the façade arrived by train and were installed in 1915. Duggins died in 1928 and his widow hired C.E. Huish, whose family owned theaters throughout Utah, to manage the theater. Huish closed in the recessed entry with a wall at the front edge of the arch, and the addition that preserved many of the original decorations. Huish also installed restrooms and changed the name to the Star Theater.

In 1940, the Cyrill E. Anderson family of Gunnison bought the theater and in the 1950s put up the triangular marquee that remained on the building until the current restoration began. The Andersons continued to operate the Star until 1973, although it became less profitable as the years passed as it faced competition from TV movies, videos and DVDs. After Cyrill E. Anderson's death in 1973, the family sold the theater to Max and Beth Curtis of Aurora, who in turn sold it to Ernie and Dawn Larson in 1981. The Larsens installed a new roof and began the nomination process for listing on the National Register of Historic places. In 1993, Paul Mower along with his son Mike Mower, owner of the Huish Theater in Payson and a descendant of one-time Star Theater manager C.E. Huish, purchased the Star. It was later incorporated into Hustar-Inc. The Mowers upgraded the seating and sound system, as well as reinforcing the wooden support system under the floor with concrete and steel. The Mowers sold the building in November 2004 to the Casino Star Theatre Foundation, a 501(c)(3) nonprofit dedicated to restoring the rather dilapidated structure to its original splendor.

Restoration of the exterior portion of the Theatre building was completed in late July 2013.

== Today ==
In the late 1980s, before Larson sold the property to Mower, Diana Major Spencer and Lori Nay founded the non-profit organization Save Our Star ("SOS") and tried to purchase and rehabilitate the theater. When Mower put the theater on the market in 2004, Nay and Spencer formed the 501(c)(3) Casino Star Theatre Foundation to finance the building's purchase and repair.

== See also ==
- National Register of Historic Places listings in Sanpete County, Utah
