= Casino Theatre (San Diego) =

Historic building in San Diego, California, U.S.

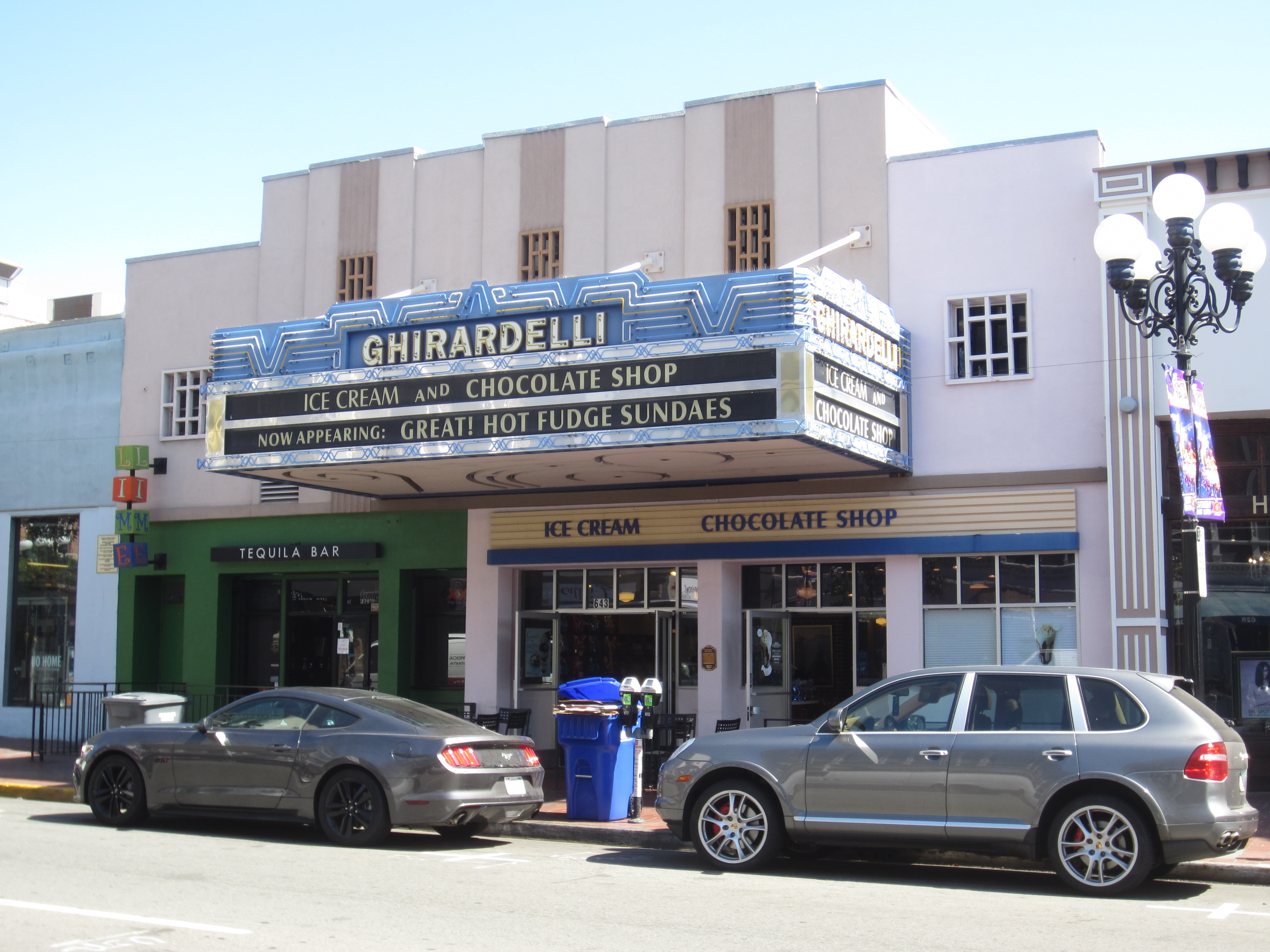
- The building's exterior in 2016

General information
- Location: 643 5th Avenue, San Diego, California, United States
- Coordinates: 32.71219°N 117.15991°W

The Casino Theatre building is a historic structure located at 643 5th Avenue in the Gaslamp Quarter, San Diego, in the state of California. It was built in 1912. The Casino Theater opened in 1913. It was later remodeled in the 1930s into an Art Deco style. In the early 1970s it was operated by Pussycat Theatre, but kept the Casino name.

In 1980, the Gaslamp Quarter was listed on the National Registrar of Historical Places and in 2012 the buildings were restored as part of the Gaslamp Quarter preservation and are now retail shops. The Casino Theatre now operates as a Ghirardelli Ice Cream and Chocolate Shop.

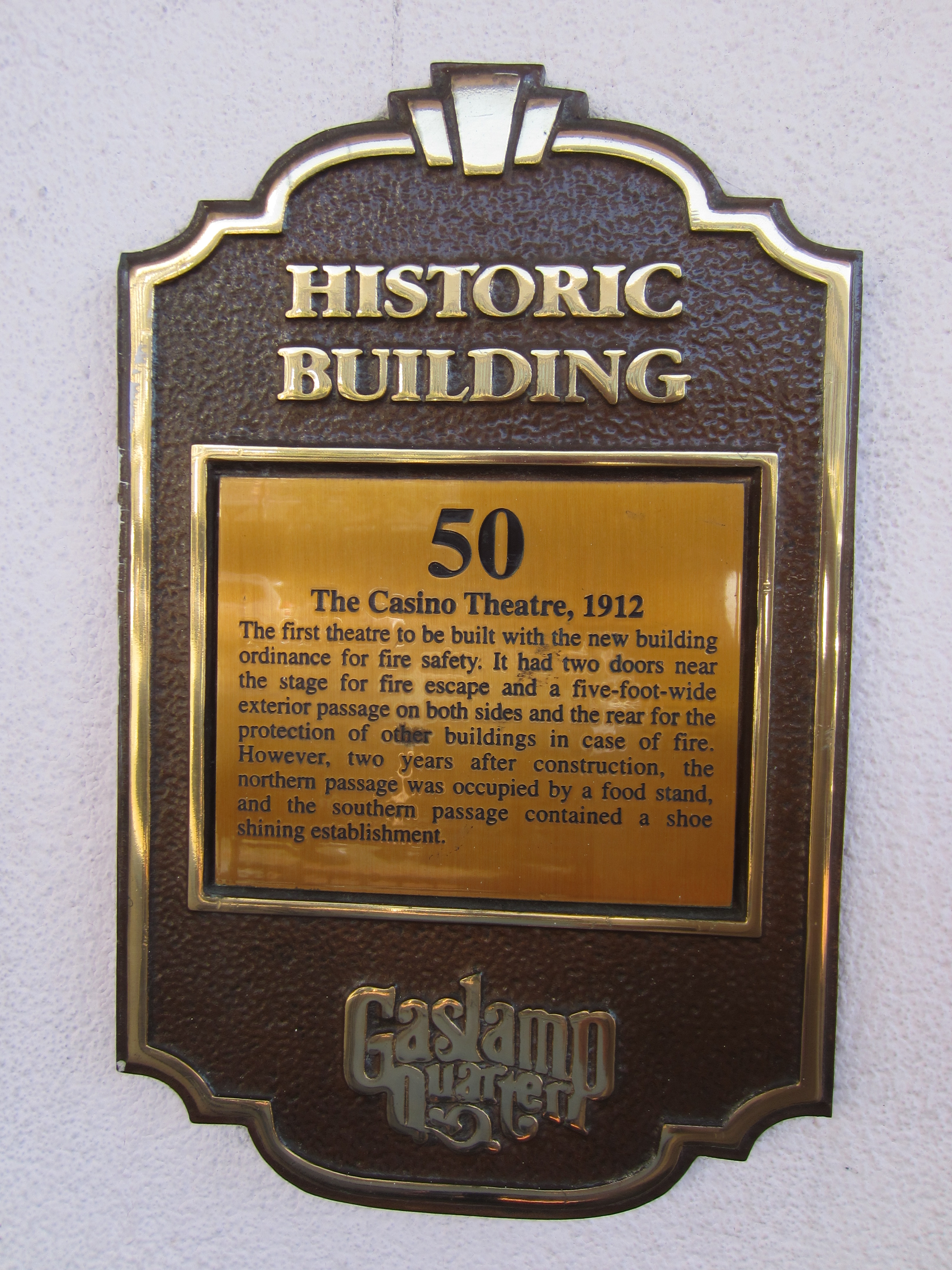
Plaque for the building, 2016

== See also ==
- List of Gaslamp Quarter historic buildings
