= Borscht =

Eastern European sour soup

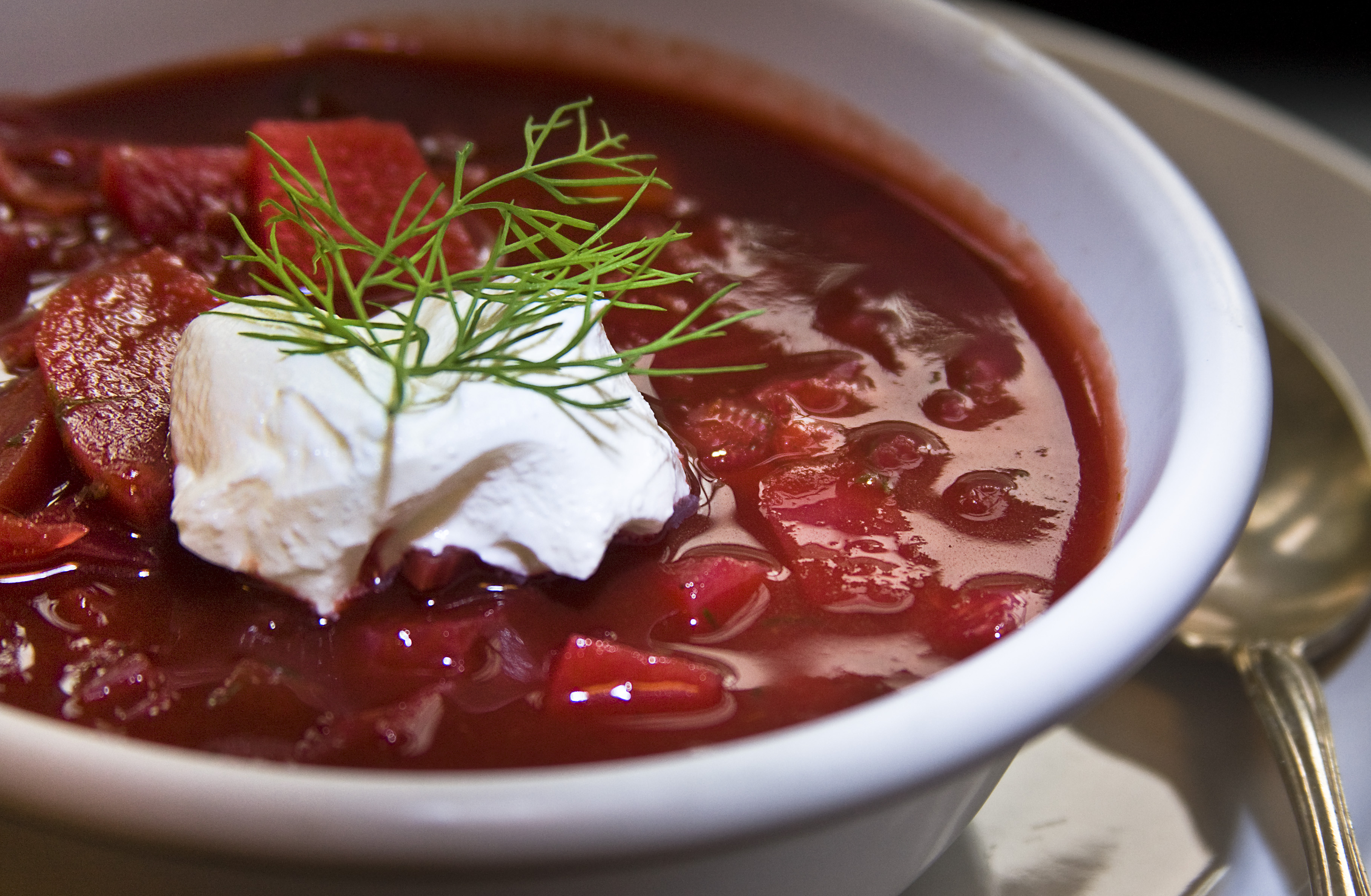
- A bowl of borscht garnished with sour cream and dill
- Alternative names: Borsch, borshch, borsht, bortsch
- Type: Soup
- Place of origin: Ukraine
- Cooking time: 30 minutes to 3 hours
- Serving temperature: Hot or cold
- Main ingredients: Beet sour or beetroots
- Ingredients generally used: Tomatoes, vinegar, cabbage and/or potatoes, meat or salo
- Variations: Clear red borscht, cold borscht, unsoured borscht
- Similar dishes: Green borscht, white borscht as well as the ancient hogweed-made borscht

Culture of Ukrainian borscht cooking
- UNESCO Intangible Cultural Heritage
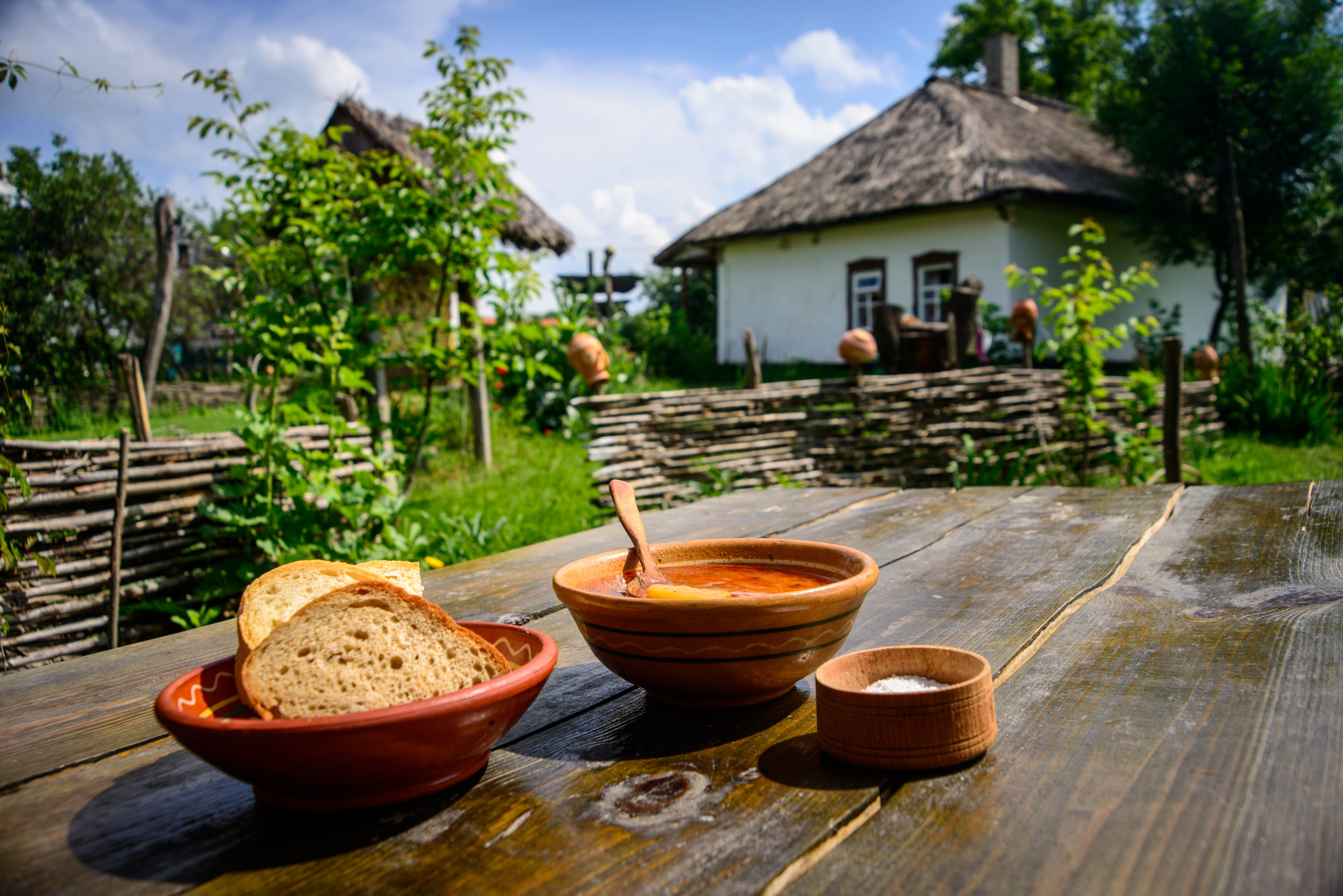
- Borscht served in a ceramic bowl with bread and salt in a village in Poltava Oblast of Ukraine
- Country: Ukraine
- Reference: 01852
- Region: Europe and North America

Inscription history
- Inscription: 2022 (5th extraordinary session)
- List: Need of Urgent Safeguarding

Borscht (English: /ˈbɔːrʃt/) is a sour soup, made with meat stock, vegetables and seasonings, common in Eastern Europe, Central Europe and Northern Asia. In English, the word borscht, borrowed via Yiddish, is most often associated with the variant of the soup originating in Ukraine, made with red beetroots as one of the main ingredients, which give the dish its distinctive red color. The same name, however, is also used for a wide selection of sour-tasting soups without beetroots, such as sorrel-based green borscht, rye-based white borscht, and cabbage borscht.

Borscht derives from an ancient soup originally cooked from pickled stems, leaves and umbels of common hogweed (Heracleum sphondylium), an herbaceous plant growing in damp meadows, which lent the dish its Slavic name. With time, it evolved into a diverse array of tart soups, among which the Ukrainian beet-based red borscht has become the most popular. It is typically made by combining meat or bone stock with sautéed vegetables, which—as well as beetroots—usually include cabbage, carrots, onions, potatoes, and tomatoes. Depending on the recipe, borscht may include meat or fish, or be purely vegetarian; it may be served either hot or cold, and it may range from a hearty one-pot meal to a clear broth or a smooth drink. It is often served with smetana or sour cream, hard-boiled eggs or potatoes, but there exists an ample choice of more involved garnishes and side dishes, such as uszka or pampushky, that can be served with the soup.

Its popularity has spread throughout Eastern Europe and—by way of migration away from the Russian Empire—to other continents. In North America, borscht is often linked with either Jews or Mennonites, the groups who first brought it there from Europe. Several ethnic groups claim borscht, in its various local implementations, as their own national dish consumed as part of ritual meals within Orthodox, Greek Catholic, Roman Catholic, and Jewish religious traditions. In 2022, shortly after Russia's invasion of Ukraine, UNESCO recognized the "Culture of Ukrainian borscht cooking" on its List of Intangible Cultural Heritage in Need of Urgent Safeguarding. UNESCO noted that several countries in the broader region have also practiced borscht cooking and their inscription does not imply exclusivity or ownership of the dish for any particular country.

== Etymology ==
The English name derives, through Yiddish, from Ukrainian and Russian бо́рщ (borshch, Ukrainian: [ˈbɔrʃt͡ʃ], Russian: [ˈborɕː]). Together with cognates in other Slavic languages, such as Belarusian: бо́ршч (borshch), Polish: barszcz, and others, it comes from Proto-Slavic *bъ̃rščь, 'hogweed', and ultimately from Proto-Indo-European *bʰr̥stis, 'point', 'stubble'.

The English form borscht comes from Yiddish באָרשט (borsht), as the dish was first popularized in North America by Yiddish-speaking Ashkenazi Jews from Eastern Europe.

== Ingredients and preparation ==
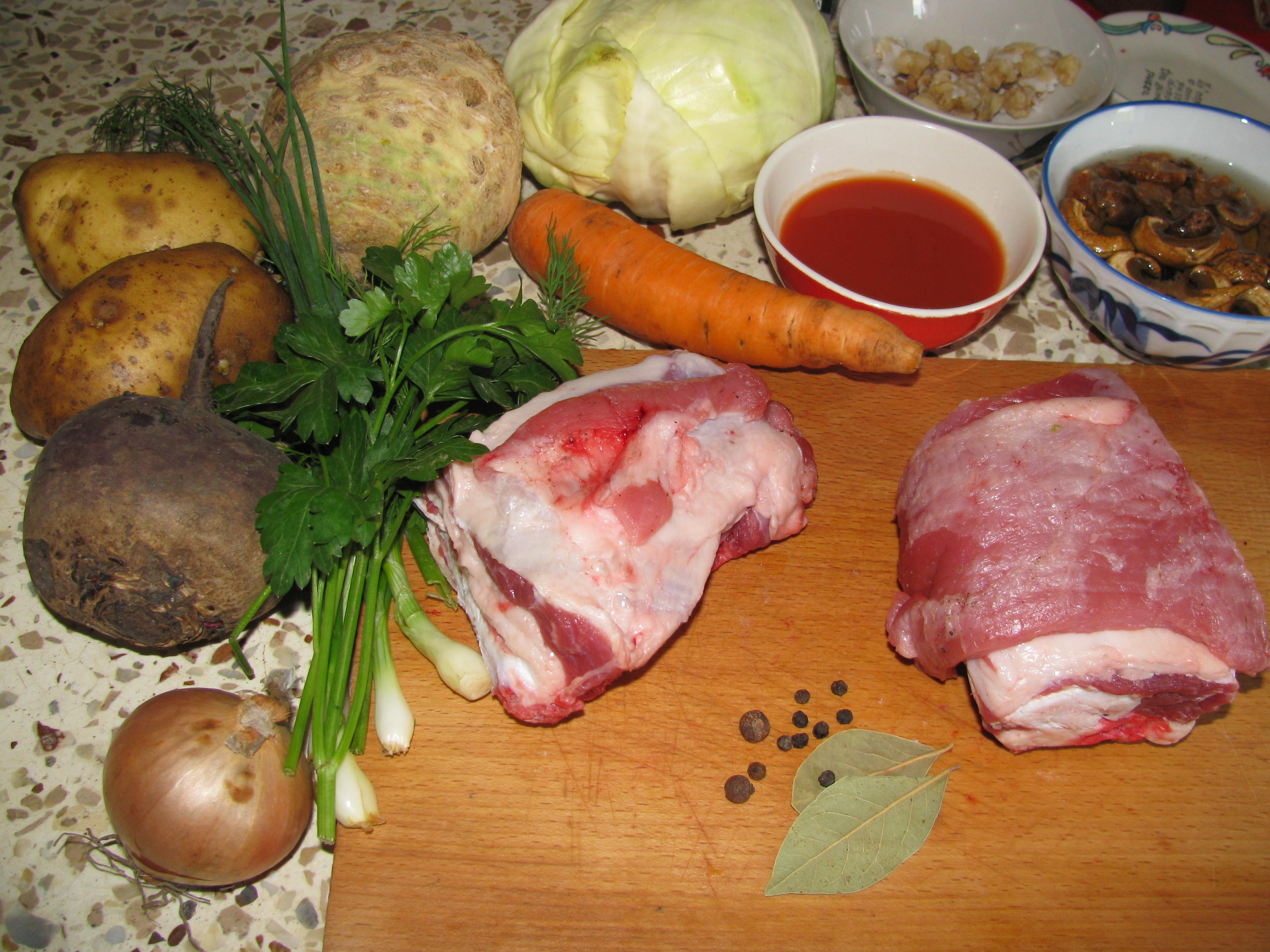
Borscht can include beef, pork, beets, other vegetables, herbs, and spices.

The stock is typically made by boiling meat, bones, or both. Beef, pork or a combination of both are most commonly used, with brisket, ribs, shank and chuck considered to give the most flavorful results, especially if cooked on a high flame. Marrow bones are considered best for the bone stock. Meat stock is usually cooked for about two hours, whereas bone stock takes four to six hours to prepare. Meat and bones are usually removed afterwards and the meat is only added back into the soup about 10–15 minutes before the borscht is done. Some recipes call for smoked meats, resulting in a distinctively smoky borscht, while others use poultry or mutton stock. Fasting varieties are typically made with fish stock to avoid the use of meat, while purely vegetarian recipes often substitute forest mushroom broth for the stock.

Borscht cooked in a clay pot inside a Russian oven in the Poltava region in central Ukraine

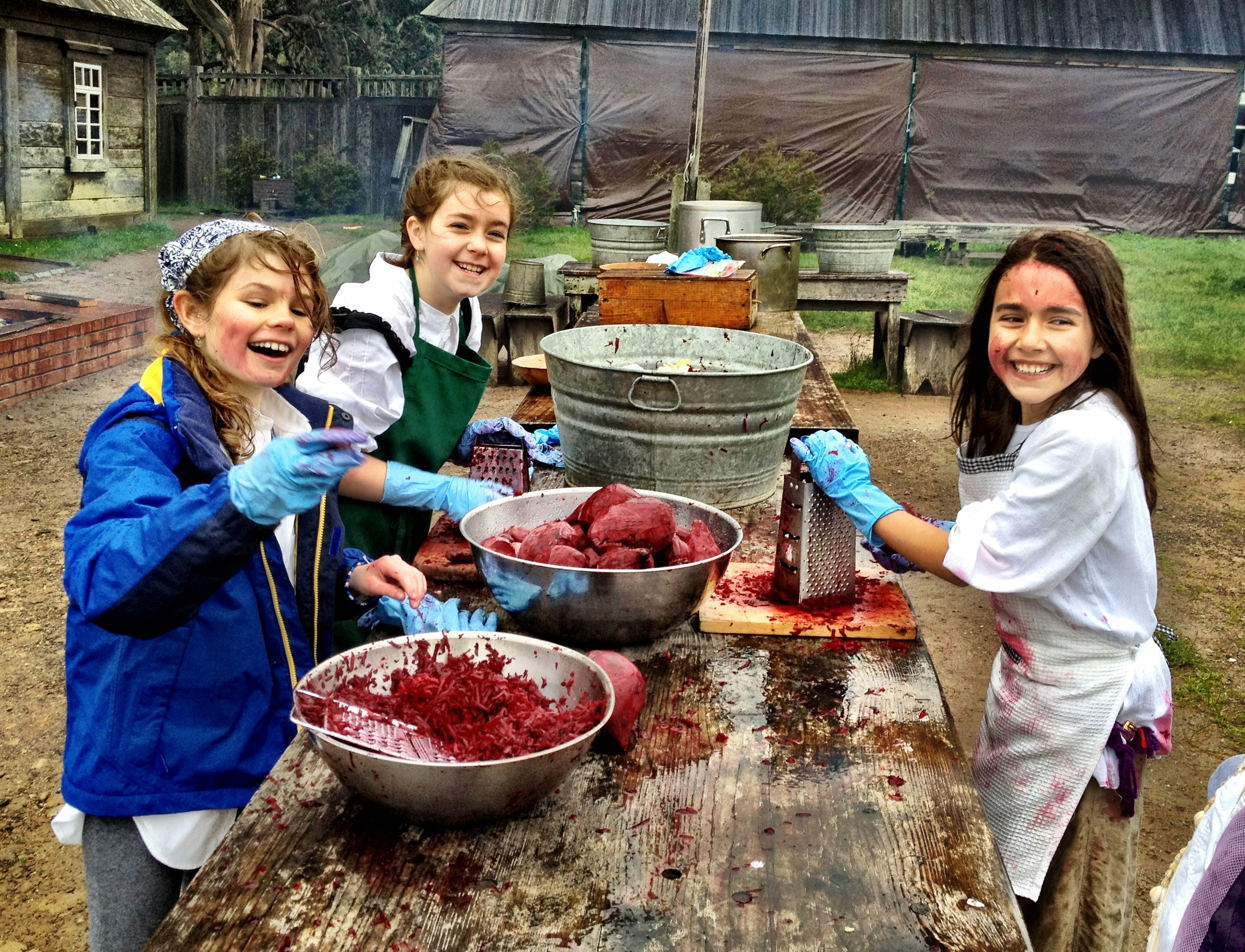
Girls grating beetroots to make borscht for a large group

The vegetables most commonly added to borscht are beetroots, white cabbage, carrots, parsley root, potatoes, onions and tomatoes. Some recipes may also call for beans, tart apples, turnip, swede, celeriac, zucchini or bell peppers. Parsnip may be used as a substitute for parsley root, and tomato paste is often used as well as or instead of fresh tomatoes. Onions, carrots, parsley root, turnip and other root vegetables are sautéed (traditionally in animal fat, especially lard or butter) and then mixed with tomatoes or tomato paste. Dry beans are boiled separately. Potatoes and cabbage are boiled in the stock for about 15 minutes before the precooked vegetables are added.

The traditional technique of preparing the soup is to precook the vegetables—by sautéing, braising, boiling or baking—separately from the meat and only then to combine them with the stock. This distinctive feature of borscht derives from the practice of slow cooking in the Russian oven (traditional masonry stove, used for both cooking and heating), wherein the differences in cooking times of individual ingredients had to be taken into account in order to ensure that all components reach doneness at the same time. The importance of this method is reflected in the Russian language, where a variant in which all vegetables are added raw directly into the stock is referred to by the diminutive form borshchok (Note: In the Cyrillic script: борщок.) rather than borshch.

The soup is typically flavored with a wide selection of herbs, spices and condiments. Salt, black pepper, garlic, bay leaves and dill are among the most commonly used. Other aromatics often added to borscht include allspice, celery stalks, parsley, marjoram, hot peppers, saffron, horseradish, ginger and prunes. Some recipes require flour or roux to further thicken the borscht. A common opinion is that a good borscht should be thick enough for a spoon to stand upright in it.

=== Beet sour ===
The dominant tastes in borscht are sweet and sour. This combination is traditionally obtained by adding beet sour. The sour is made by covering sliced beetroots with lukewarm preboiled water and allowing bacteria to ferment some of the sugars present in beetroots into dextran (which gives the liquid a slightly viscous consistency), mannitol, acetic acid and lactic acid. Stale rye bread is often added to hasten the process, but usually omitted in Jewish recipes, as chametz (leavened bread) would make the sour unfit for Passover meals. Sugar, salt and lemon juice may also be added to balance the flavor. After about 2–5 days (or 2–3 weeks without the bread), the deep red, sweet and sour liquid may be strained and is ready to use. It is added to borscht shortly before the soup is done, as prolonged boiling would cause the tart flavor to dissipate.

The beet sour is known in Slavic languages as kvas (Note: Polish: kwas buraczany; Russian: свекольный квас (svekolny kvas); Ukrainian: буряковий квас (buriakovyi kvas).) (lit. 'sour, acid'; compare kvass) and in Yiddish as rosl (Note: In the Hebrew script: ראָסל; also Romanized as rosel, rossel, russel or russell.) (from a Slavic word originally referring to any brine obtained by steeping salted meat or vegetables in water; compare Russian rassol, (Note: In the Cyrillic script: рассол.) 'pickle juice', Polish rosół, 'broth'). Apart from its employment in borscht, it may also be added to prepared horseradish or used as pot roast marinade.

As the traditional method of making borscht with beet sour often requires planning at least several days ahead, many recipes for quicker borscht replace the beet sour with fresh beetroot juice, while the sour taste is imparted by other ingredients. Vinegar, tomato products, lemon juice or citric acid may be used, as well as dry red wine, dill pickle juice, murături juice, sauerkraut juice, tart apples, Mirabelle plums, apricots, or a fermented rye flour and water mixture.

== Health significance ==
As early as the 19th century, it was recommended for fever and sore throat. It was believed to purify the blood, improve the complexion, and restore appetite. Beets, which are the base of borscht, are a rich source of folic acid, vitamin C, and B vitamins. They contain powerful antioxidants—betaine and pigments—that support the circulatory system and help fight free radicals. People with insulin resistance, type 2 diabetes, rheumatism, gout, or kidney stones should avoid borscht due to its high glycemic index and the presence of oxalates.

== Variations ==
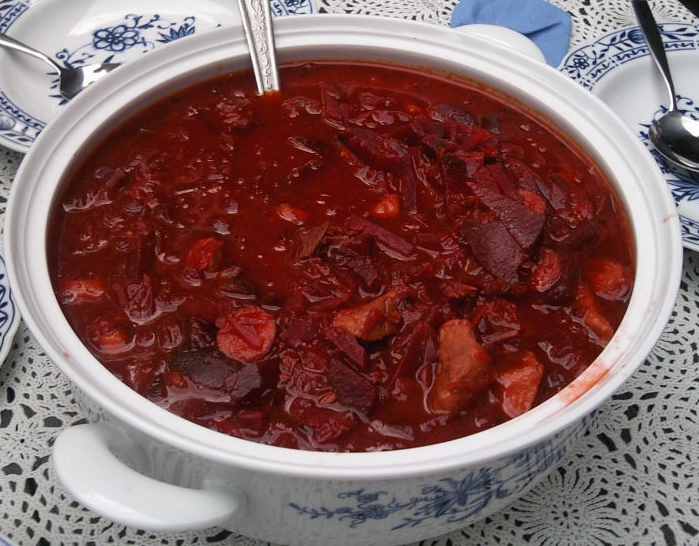
A tureen of thick borscht

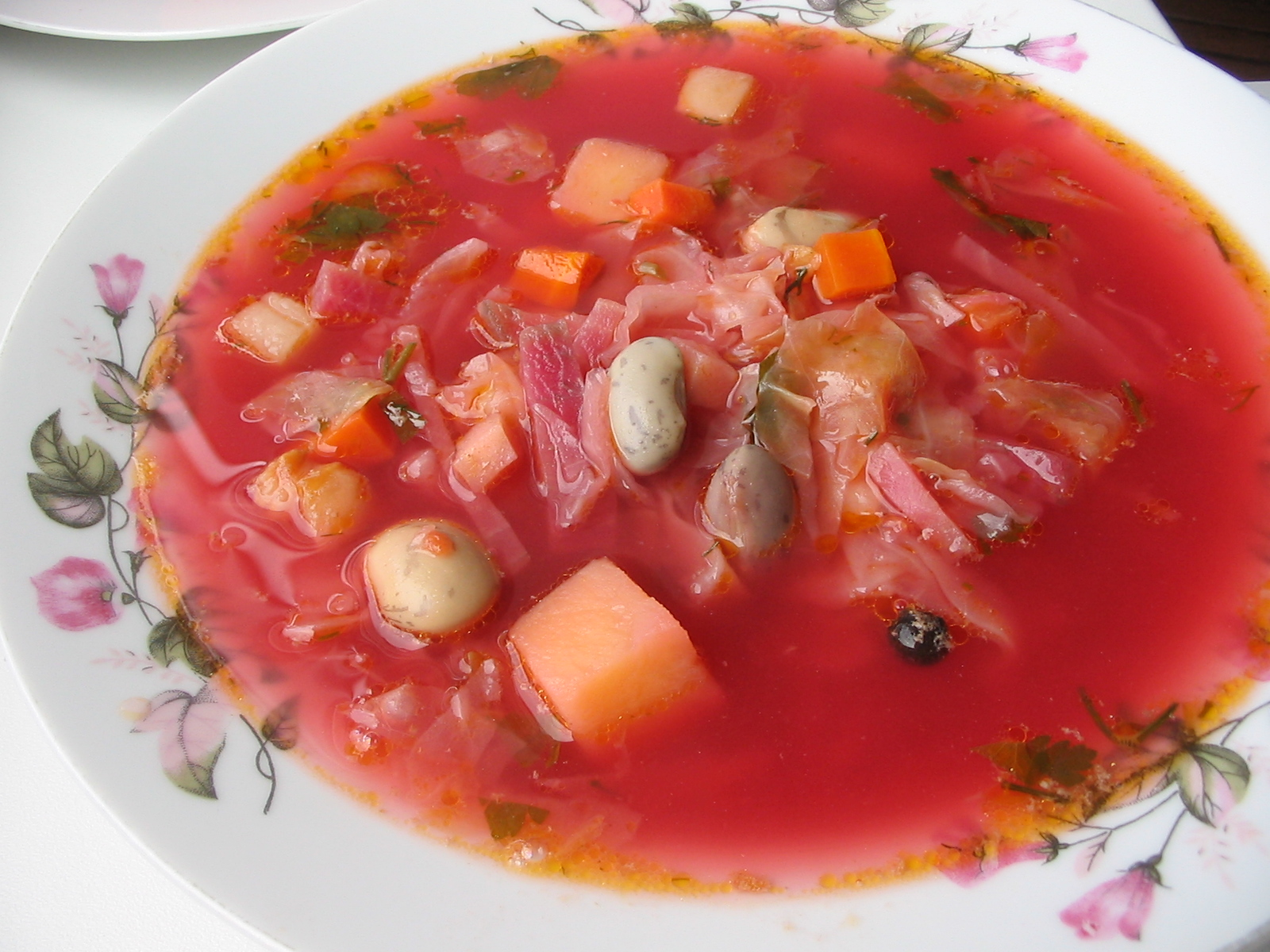
A bowl of borscht with beans and other vegetables

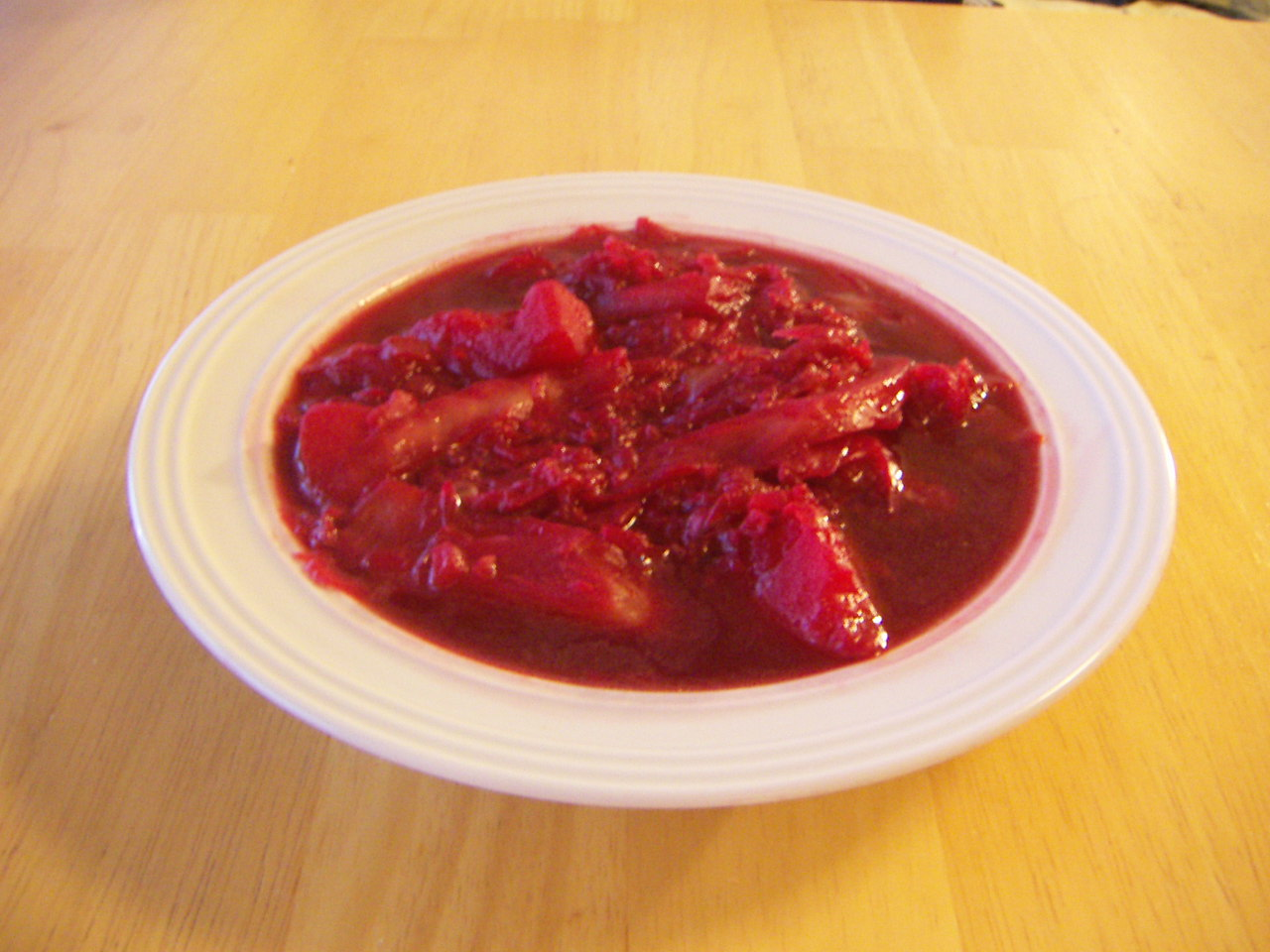
Borscht without meat

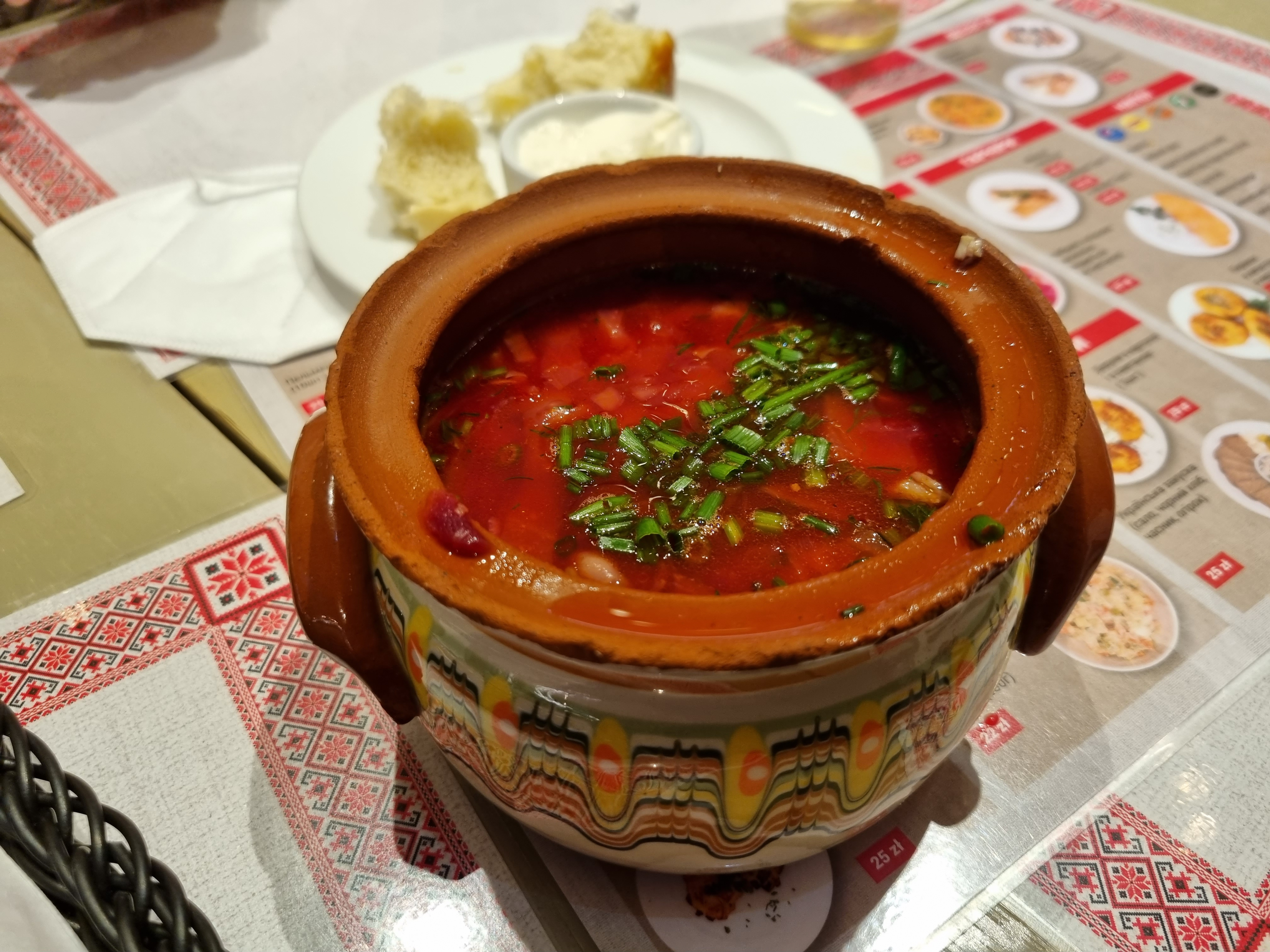
A clay bowl of borscht

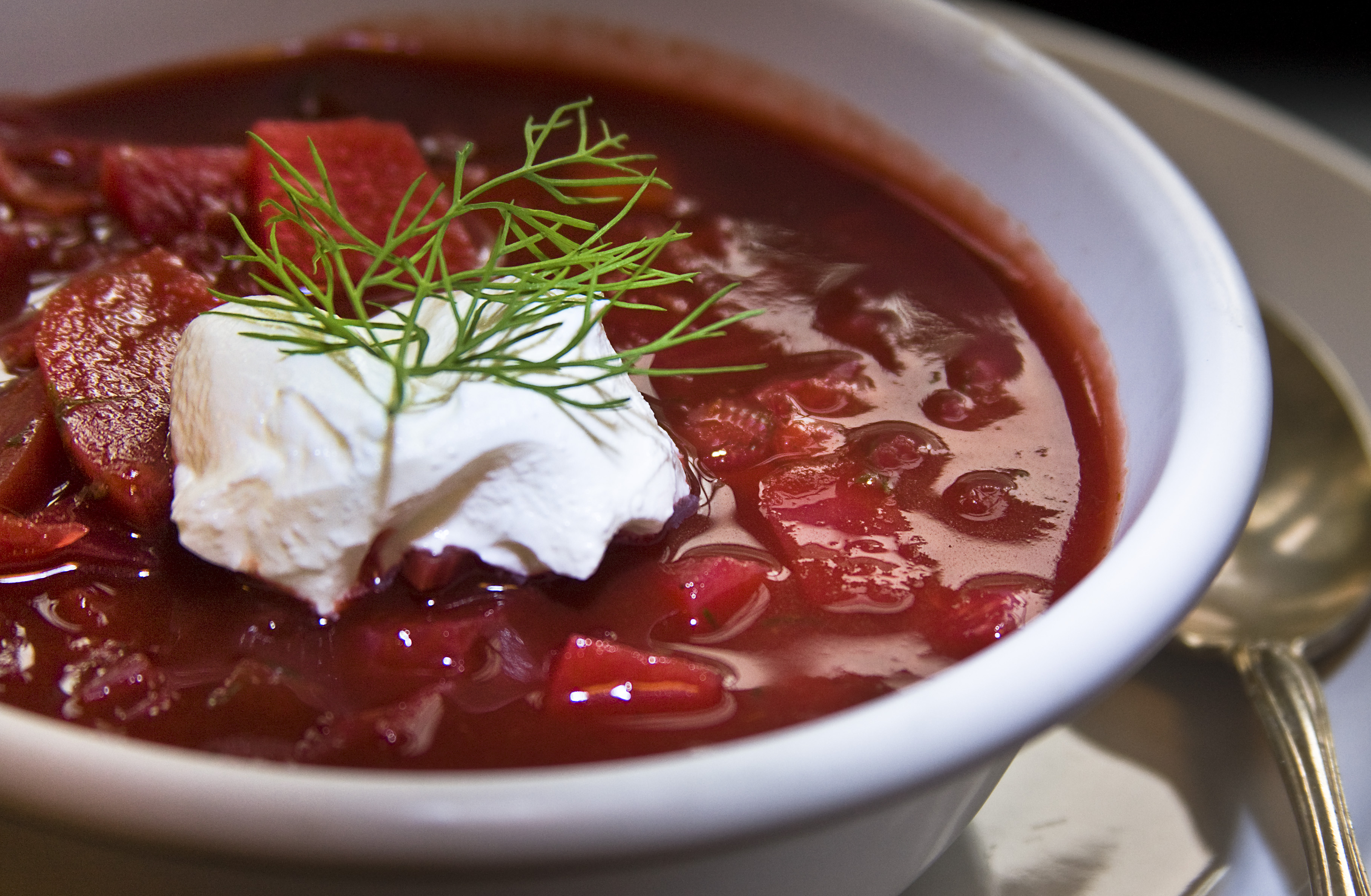
Borscht with sour cream and dill

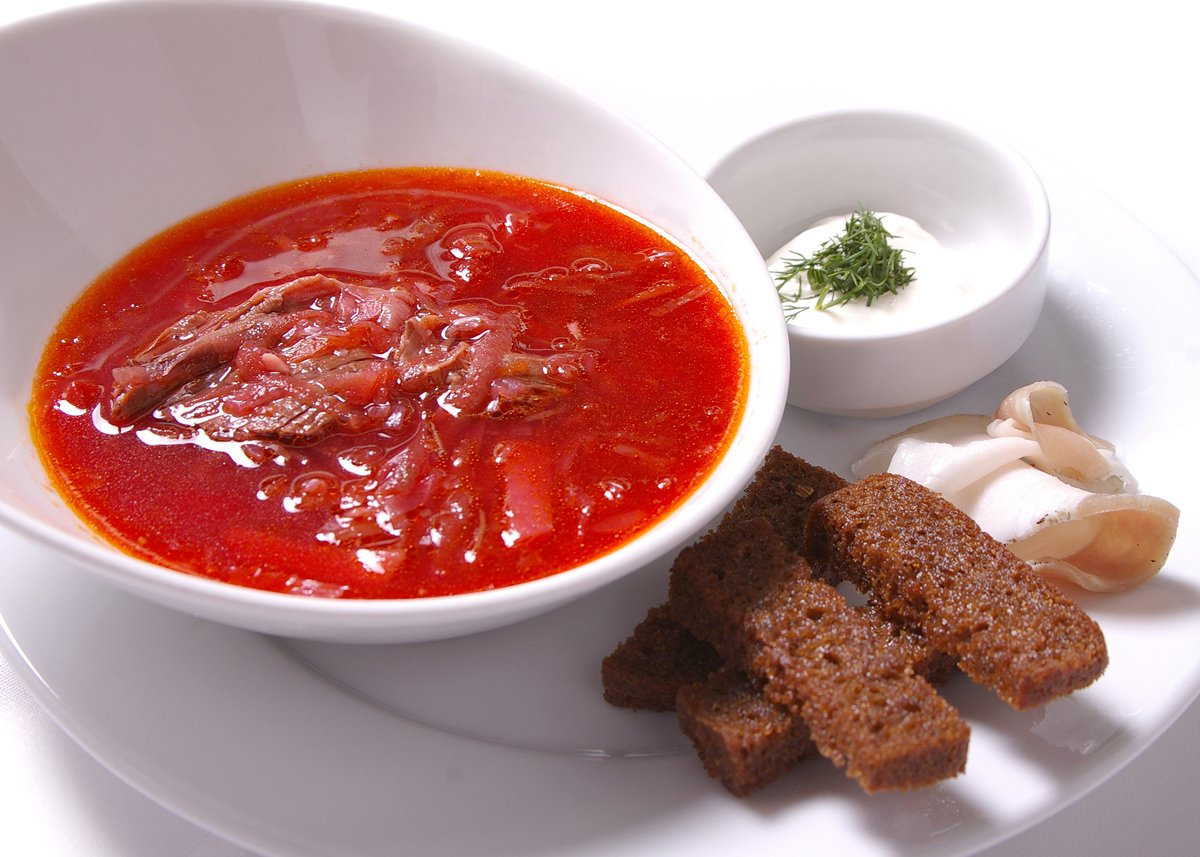
Served with sour cream and brown bread

=== Ukrainian ===
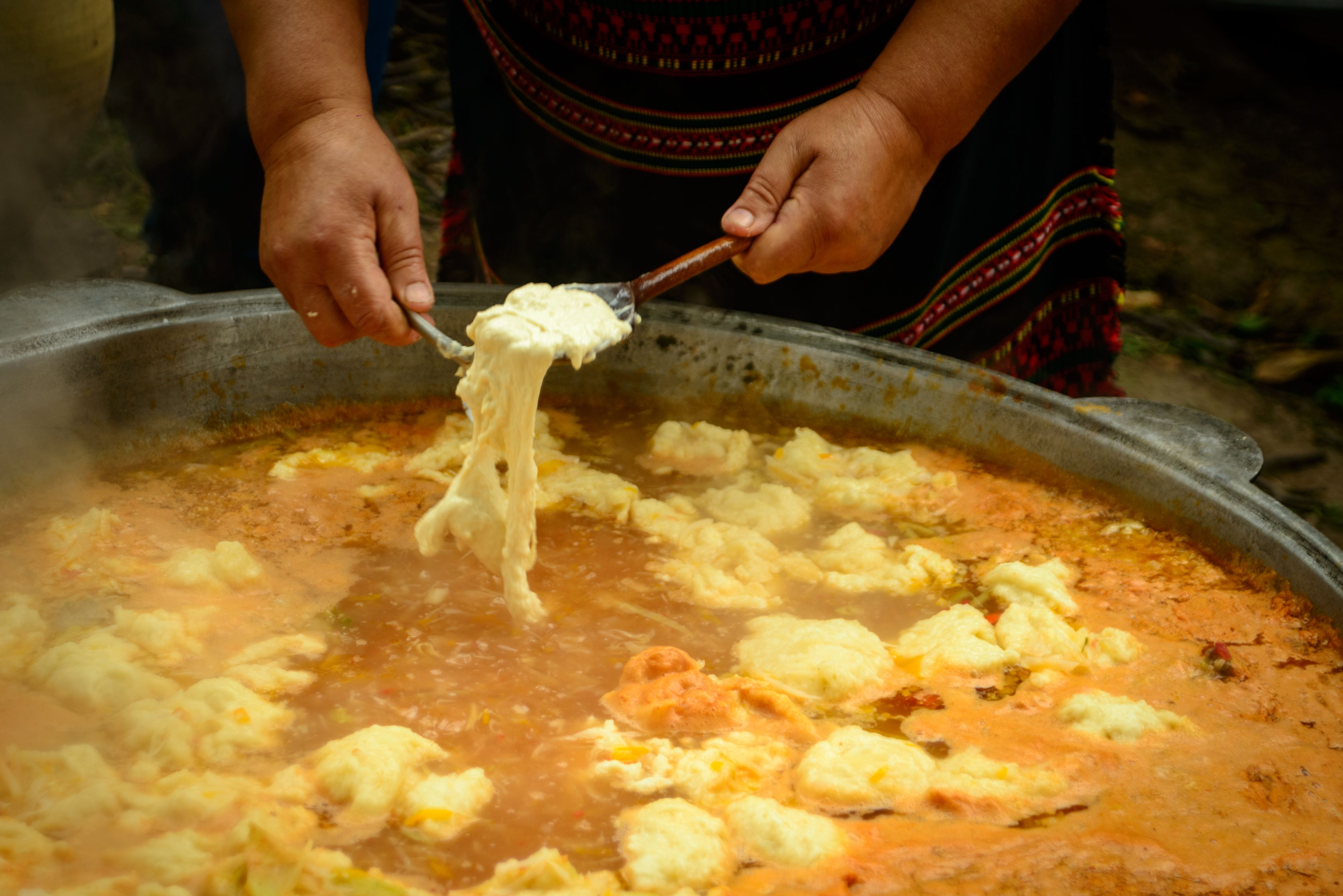
Poltava borscht with halushky and noodles

There are multiple examples of the soup in Ukrainian cuisine. Virtually every oblast has its own version. Differences between particular varieties may regard the type of stock used (meat, bone, or both), the type of meat (beef, pork, poultry, etc.), the choice of vegetables and the method of cutting and cooking them. For example, although the typical recipe calls for beef and pork, the Kyiv variant uses mutton or lamb as well as beef, while in the Poltava region, the stock for borscht is cooked on poultry meat, that is, chicken, duck or goose. The use of zucchini, beans and apples is characteristic of the Chernihiv borscht; in this variant, beetroots are sautéed in vegetable oil rather than lard, and the sour taste comes solely from tomatoes and tart apples. The Lviv borscht is based on bone stock and is served with chunks of Vienna sausages. In Southern Ukraine borshch typically includes legumes. Historically, borshch with meat was reserved as a holiday dish, meanwhile varieties consumed during lent would include fish, such as dried crucian carp.

Numerous seasonal varieties of borshch exist in Ukrainian tradition: in spring and during summer, green borshch is traditionally cooked, meanwhile borshch with pork would be traditionally reserved for Christmas season, and in autumn borshch with mutton and chicken was also popular. The traditional variety of borshch consumed during Lent contained fish, wheat flour, hemp oil, beans and potatoes. Other popular traditional ingredients of borshch are salo, fried sausages. During the late 19th century a dish known as panskyi borshch ("lords' borshch") would be cooked with the addition of duck, chicken and pork meat.

Borscht is symbolic of hospitality in Ukraine and is part of multiple traditional celebrations and rituals. In some parts of Ukraine, the third day of a wedding celebration is called do nevistky na borshch, which translates to "visit daughter-in-law to eat borscht". In 2022, UNESCO added "Culture of Ukrainian borscht cooking" to the List of Intangible Cultural Heritage in Need of Urgent Safeguarding, citing the Russian invasion of Ukraine.

=== Polish ===
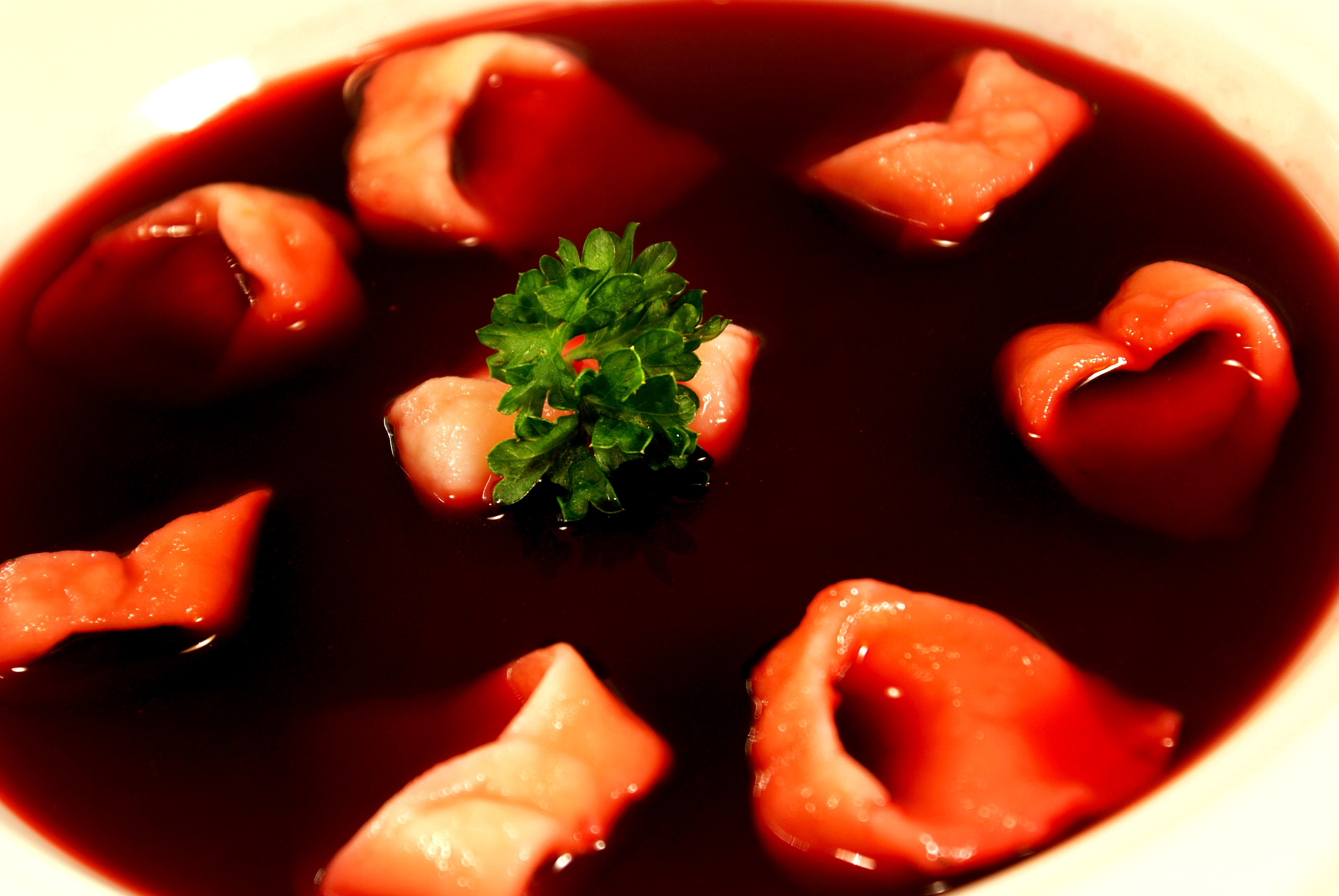
Polish clear Christmas Eve barszcz served over uszka, or ear-shaped mushroom-filled dumplings

As well as the thick borschts described above, Polish cuisine offers a ruby-colored beetroot bouillon known as barszcz czysty czerwony, or clear red borscht. It is made by combining strained meat-and-vegetable stock with wild mushroom broth and beet sour. In some versions, smoked meat may be used for the stock and the tartness may be obtained or enhanced by adding lemon juice, dill pickle brine, or dry red wine. It may be served either in a soup bowl or—especially at dinner parties—as a hot beverage in a twin-handled cup, with a croquette or a filled pastry on the side. Unlike other types of borscht, it is not whitened with sour cream.

Barszcz wigilijny, or Christmas Eve borscht, is a variant of the clear borscht that is traditionally served during the Polish Christmas Eve supper. In this version, meat stock is either omitted or replaced with fish broth, usually made by boiling the heads cut off from fish used in other Christmas Eve dishes. The mushrooms used for cooking the mushroom broth are reserved for uszka (small filled dumplings), which are then served with the borscht.

=== Jewish ===
Ashkenazi Jews living in Eastern Europe adopted beetroot borscht from their Slavic neighbors and adapted it to their taste and religious requirements. As combining meat with milk is proscribed by kosher dietary laws, Jews have developed two variants of the soup: meat (fleischik) and dairy (milchik). The meat variant is typically made from beef brisket (pork is never used) and cabbage, while the dairy one is vegetarian, blended with sour cream or a mixture of milk and egg yolks. Both variants typically contain beetroots and onions, and are flavored with beet sour, vinegar or citric acid for tartness and beet sugar for sweetness. Galician Jews traditionally liked their borscht particularly sweet. Jewish borscht may be served either hot or cold, typically with a hot boiled potato on the side. In prewar Eastern Europe it was traditionally put up to ferment around Purim so that it would be ready four weeks later for the Passover holiday.

=== Russian ===
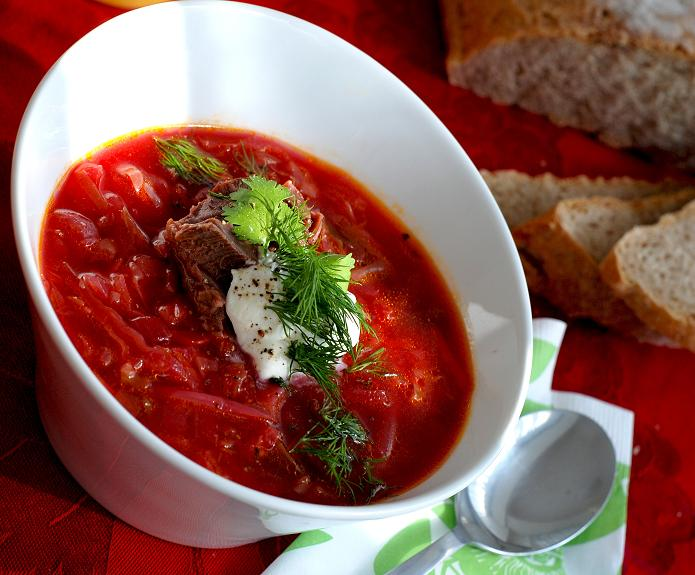
Borscht with beef, sour cream and fresh herbs

Russian variants include a Siberian style borscht, characterized by meatballs; Pskov borscht with dried smelt from the local lakes; monastic Lenten borscht with marinated kelp instead of cabbage and the Russian Navy borscht (flotsky borshch (Note: In the Cyrillic script: флотский борщ.)), the defining characteristic of which is that the vegetables are cut into square or diamond-shaped chunks rather than julienned. Kuban borscht is made from local beets, Kuban borschevaya 43 cultivar, which is distinguished by its less bright color. As a result, the borscht turns out golden or orange in color.

=== Lithuanian cold borscht ===
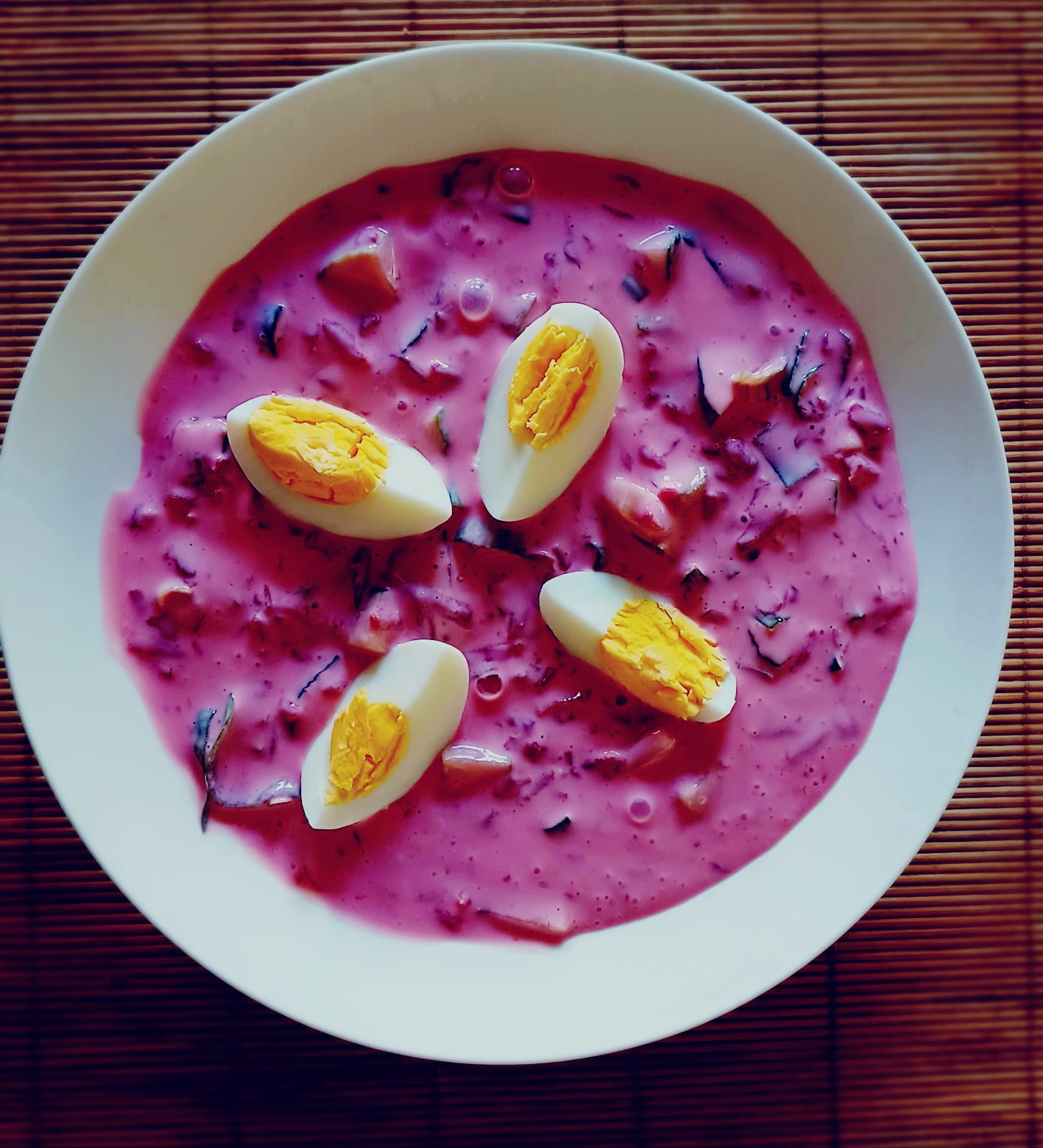
Šaltibarščiai with boiled eggs

In summer, cold borscht (also known as cold beet soup) is a popular alternative to borscht variants that are normally served hot. It consists of beet sour or beet juice blended with sour cream, buttermilk, soured milk, kefir or yogurt. The mixture has a distinctive pink or magenta color. It is served refrigerated, typically over finely chopped beetroot, cucumbers, radishes and green onion together with halves of a hard-boiled egg, and sprinkled with fresh dill. Chopped veal, ham, or crawfish tails may be added as well.

The dish originates from the shared culinary traditions of the Polish–Lithuanian Commonwealth. Originally a common everyday food among the local peasantry of the Grand Duchy of Lithuania, the cold soup eventually became a delicacy on noble tables. Early 19th-century accounts, such as by physician Johann Peter Frank who was served the icy soup in Nyasvizh in 1805, describe it as an already established local dish. The first known recipe for the dish, simply called chłodnik, was recorded in Warsaw at the end of the 18th century by Paul Tremo, the chef to the Commonwealth's last ruler.

The Polish–Lithuanian poet Adam Mickiewicz mentioned the Lithuanian cold beet soup in his 1834 epic poem Pan Tadeusz. It was a daily summer staple food of enjoyed by many social classes, ranging from peasants to nobles. Today, it is an exceptionally popular summer dish in Lithuania, in whose capital Vilnius, an annual festival (the Vilnius Pink Soup Fest) has been organised since 2023 to celebrate its cultural heritage.

== Namesakes without beets ==
Although borscht is mostly used to describe a beet-based soup, there are soups in some culinary traditions with the same or similar names, but with sometimes wide variations in ingredients and preparation methods. In such soups, beetroots are not used or merely optional. The principal common trait among such borschts is a tart flavor from sour-tasting ingredients. According to A Gift to Young Housewives, a book from the 19th century, "borscht" may or may not include beets (depending from recipe to recipe in the book).

In Polish cuisine, white borscht (barszcz biały, also known as żur or żurek, 'sour soup' (Note: Polish terms barszcz biały 'white borscht' and żur or żurek are either used interchangeably or refer to different soups, depending on the regional dialect and ingredients used.)) is made from a fermented mixture of rye flour or oatmeal and water. It is typically flavored with garlic and marjoram, and served over eggs and boiled fresh sausage; the water in which the sausage was boiled is often used instead of meat stock.

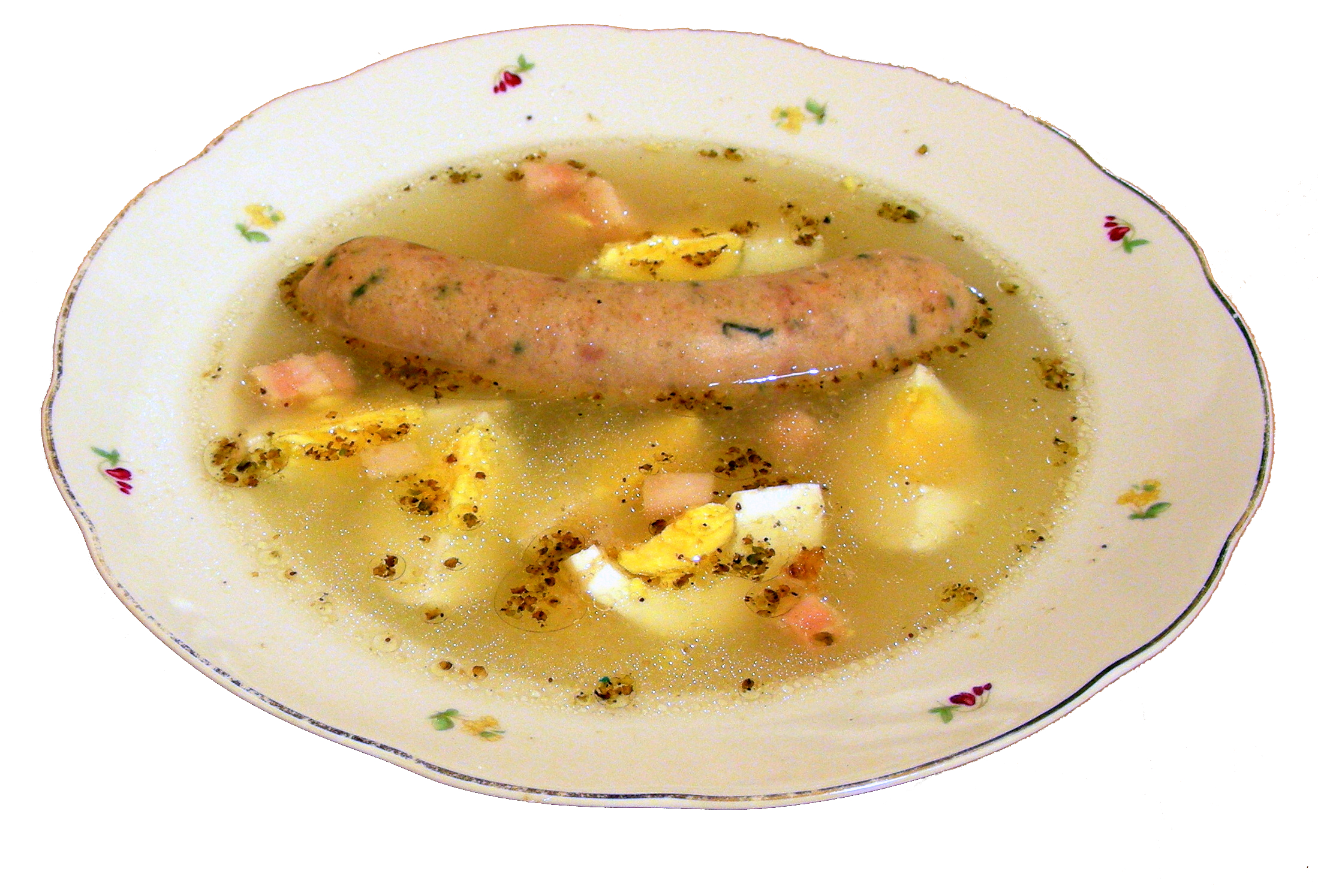
Polish white borscht served over fresh sausage, bacon and eggs

In the Carpathian Mountains of southern Poland, variants of borscht are also made in which the tart taste comes from dairy products, such as whey or buttermilk. Although the deep red color of beetroot borscht may remind those unfamiliar with Polish cuisine of blood, the type of borscht that does contain animal (usually poultry) blood mixed with vinegar is dark brownish-gray in color and aptly called "gray borscht" (barszcz szary), which is a regional name of the Polish blood soup better known as czernina.

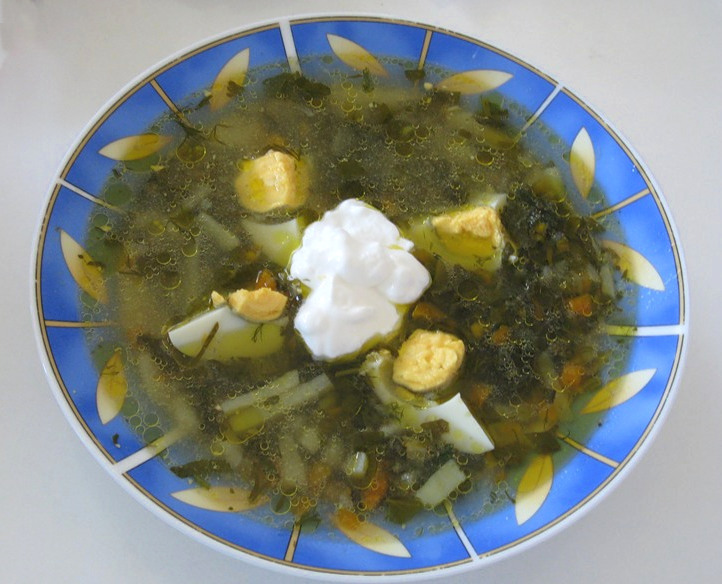
Sorrel-based Ukrainian green borscht served with sour cream and a hard-boiled egg

Green borscht (zeleny borshch (Note: Russian: зелёный борщ (zelyony borshch); Ukrainian: зелений борщ (zelenyi borshch).)), a light soup made from leaf vegetables, is an example common in Ukrainian and Russian cuisines. The naturally tart-tasting sorrel is most commonly used, but spinach, chard, nettle, garden orache and occasionally dandelion, goutweed or ramsons, may be added as well, especially after the spring season for sorrel has passed. Like beetroot borscht, it is based on meat or vegetable broth and is typically served with boiled potatoes and hard-boiled eggs, sprinkled with dill. There is also a variety of Ukrainian green borscht which includes both sorrel and beetroots.

In Romanian and Moldovan cuisines, a mixture of wheat bran or cornmeal with water that has been left to ferment, similar to, but less cloudy than that used in Polish white borscht, is called borș. It is used to impart a sour taste to a variety of tangy Romanian soups, known as either also borș or ciorbă. Variants include ciorbă de perișoare (with meatballs), ciorbă de burtă (with tripe), borș de pește (with fish) and borș de sfeclă roșie (with beetroots).

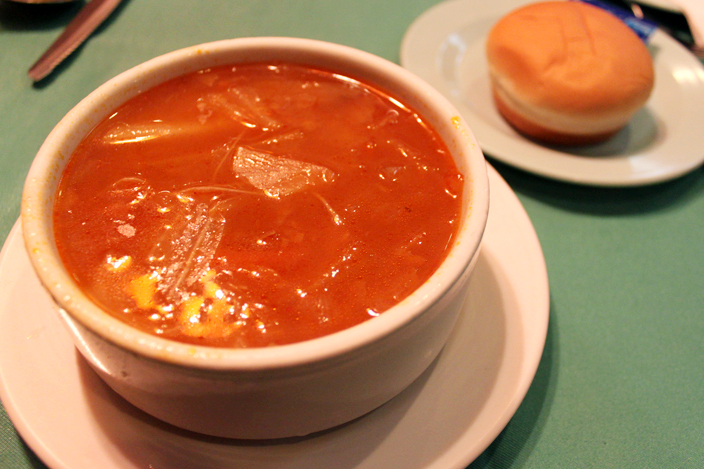
A bowl of Hong Kong style borscht, made from cabbage and tomatoes, as widely served in local cha chaan tengs

The Armenian, Azerbaijani and Georgian version of borscht is a hot soup made with beef stock, green peppers and other vegetables, which may or may not include beetroots, and flavored with chopped red chili and fresh cilantro. In ethnic Mennonite cuisine, borscht refers to a whole range of seasonal vegetable soups based on beef or chicken stock—from spring borscht made with spinach, sorrel and chard to summer borscht with cabbage, tomatoes, maize and squash to fall and winter borscht with cabbage, beets and potatoes.

In Chinese cuisine, a soup known as Luosong tang, (Note: simplified Chinese: 罗宋汤; traditional Chinese: 羅宋湯; Jyutping: lo4 sung3 tong1) a translation based on the term "Russian soup" from the Russian diaspora in China, is based on red cabbage and tomatoes, and lacks beetroots altogether; also known as "Chinese borscht", it originated in Harbin, close to the Russian border in northeast China, and has spread as far as Hong Kong. In Shanghai's Haipai cuisine, tomatoes are the main ingredient; beef and its broth, onions and cabbages are also added; while flour, rather than sour cream, is used for thickening. In Japan, chain of soup restaurants Soup Stock Tokyo offers a dish called Tokyo borscht (東京ボルシチ).

== Garnishes and side dishes ==
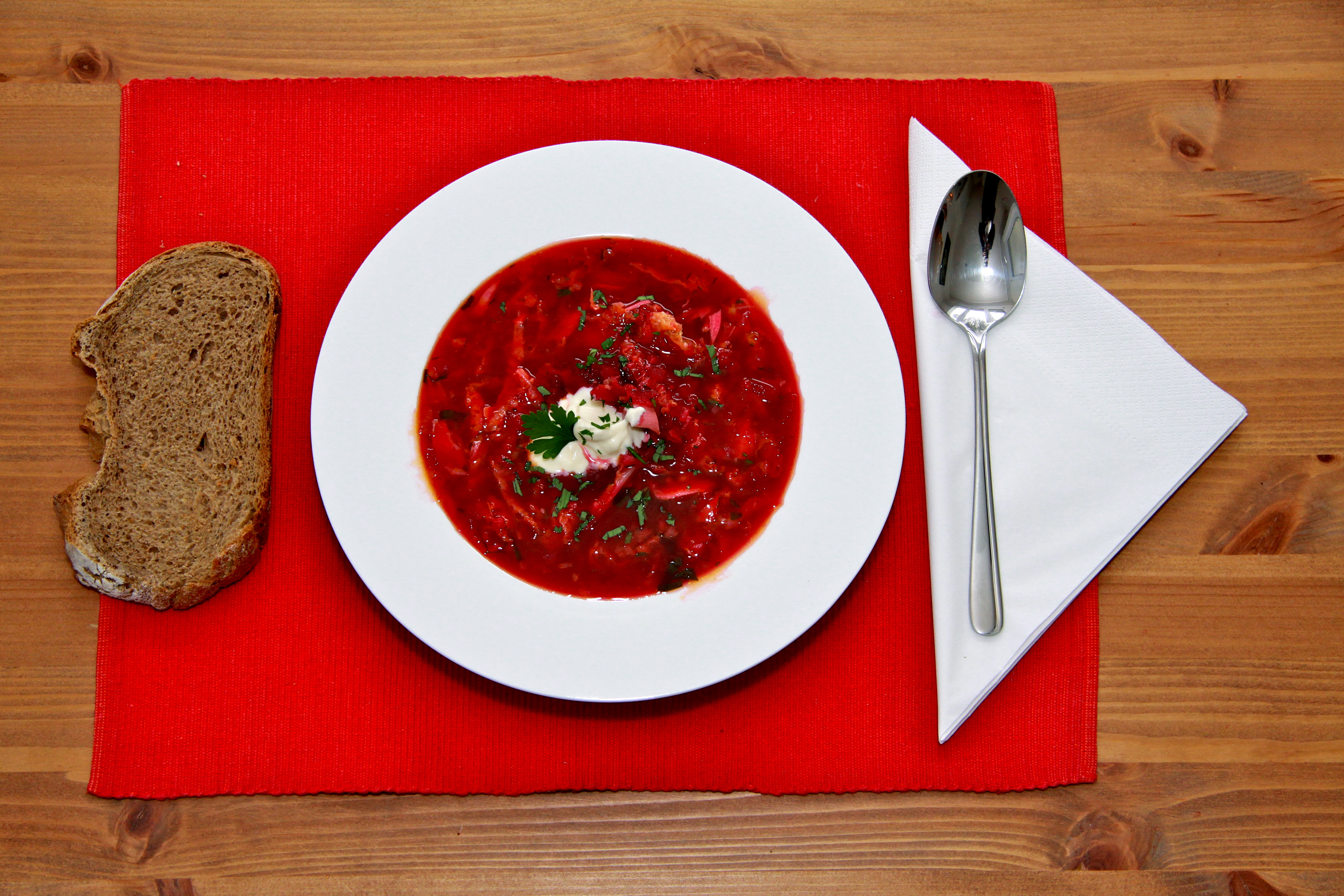
Borscht sprinkled with parsley, served with sour cream and a slice of rye bread

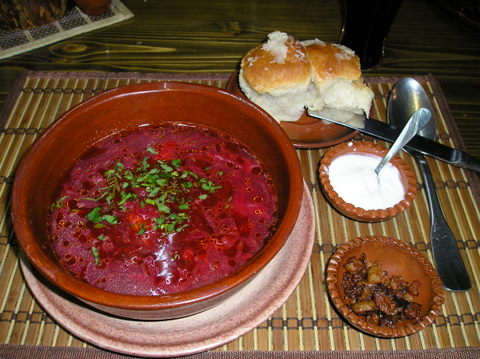
Borscht with a side of pampushky, pork cracklings and smetana

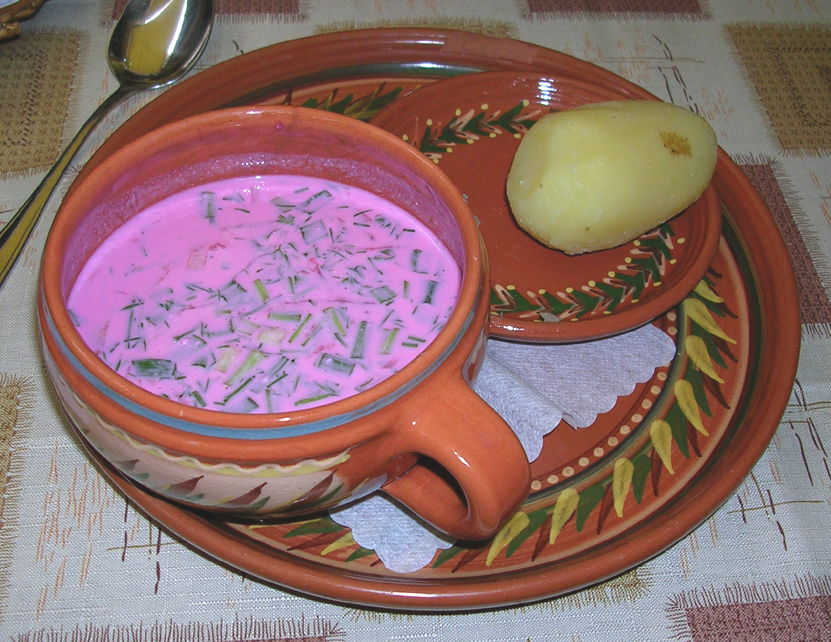
Šaltibarščiai served with a boiled potato

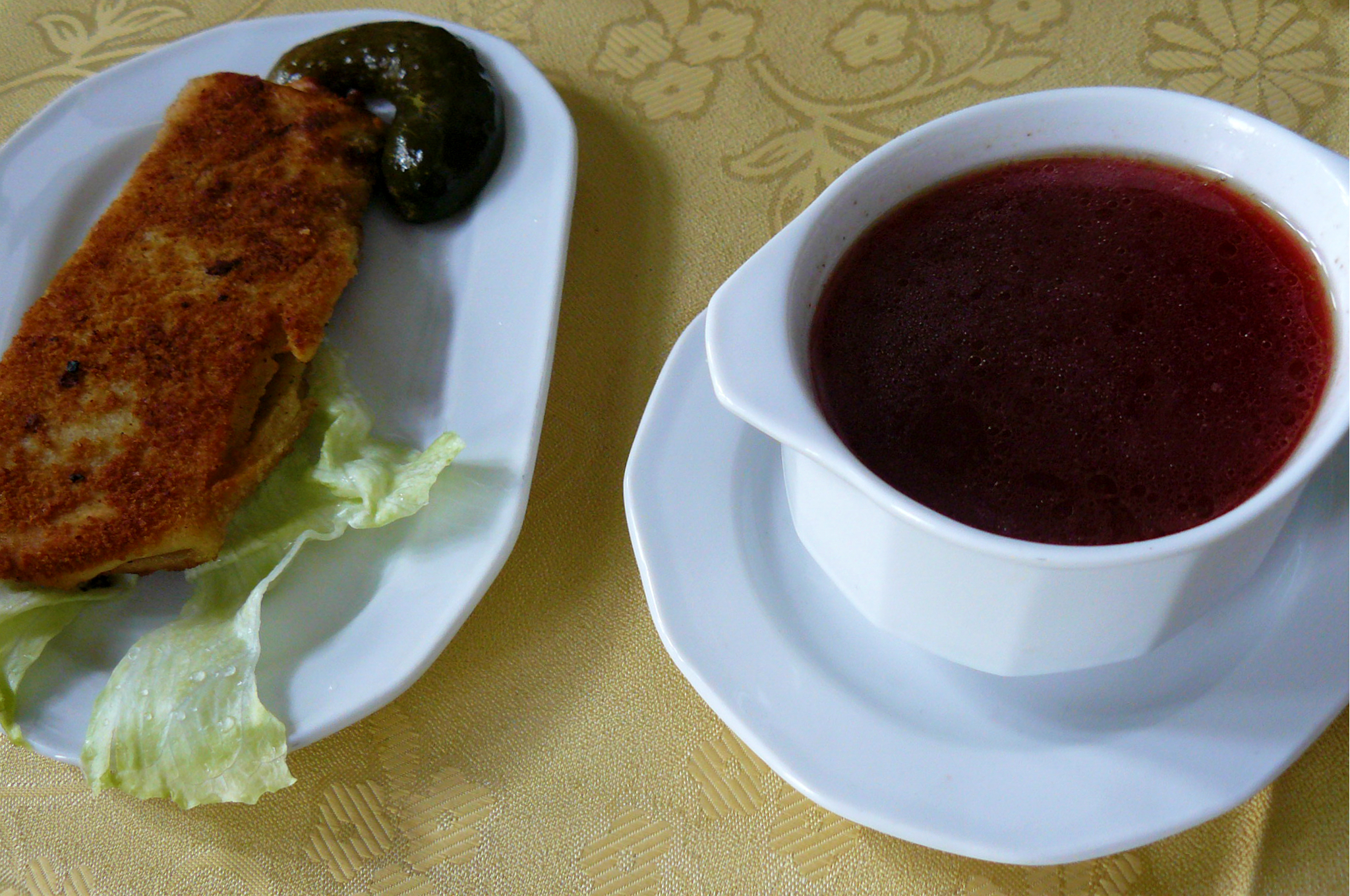
A bouillon cup of clear borscht, a type of borscht with a krokiet and a brine-pickled gherkin on the side

The diversity of borscht styles is matched by the wide choice of garnishes and side dishes with which various types of borscht may be served. Most often, borscht is served with smetana, a soured dairy product similar to the French crème fraîche. The smetana may be served in a separate pitcher for the diners to add the desired amount themselves or the borscht may come already "whitened" (Note: Polish: barszcz zabielany; Russian: забеленный борщ (zabelenny borshch); literally 'whitened borscht', that is, clouded with flour or dairy products. In Yiddish, the process of whitening borscht is known as farweissen.) with the smetana already added. The cream can also be thickened with flour before being added to the soup. Yogurt and a mixture of milk and yolks are possible substitutes.

Chopped herbs are often sprinkled on the surface of the soup; dill is most common, but parsley, chives or scallion are often added as well. Individual helpings may be spiced up with minced hot peppers or garlic. Many types of borscht are served over halves or quarters of hard-boiled chicken or quail eggs. Navy beans, broad beans or string beans are also a common addition.

Meat, removed from the stock on which the borscht was based, may be cut into smaller chunks and either added back into the soup or served on the side with horseradish or mustard. Bacon and sausages are also commonly used as borscht garnishes. Borscht based on bone stock may be served Old Polish-style, with marrow from the bones.

Some types of soup, such as Poltava borscht, may be served with halushky, or thick noodles of wheat or buckwheat flour. Siberian borscht is eaten with boiled meatballs (frikadelki (Note: In the Cyrillic script: фрикадельки.)) of minced beef and onion. In Poland and parts of western Ukraine, borscht is typically ladled over uszka, or bite-sized ear-shaped dumplings made from pasta dough wrapped around mushroom, buckwheat or meat filling. Mushroom-filled uszka are particularly associated with Polish Christmas Eve borscht.

Borscht, like any other soup in East Slavic cuisines, is seldom eaten by itself, but rather accompanied by a side dish. At a minimum, spoonfuls of borscht are alternated with bites of a slice of bread. Buckwheat groats or boiled potatoes, often topped with pork cracklings, are other simple possibilities.

In Ukraine, borscht is often accompanied with pampushky, or savory, puffy yeast-raised rolls glazed with oil and crushed garlic. In Russian cuisine, borscht may be served with assorted side dishes based on tvorog, or the East European variant of farmer cheese, such as vatrushki, syrniki or krupeniki. Vatrushki are baked round cheese-filled tarts; syrniki are small pancakes wherein the cheese is mixed into the batter; and a krupenik is a casserole of buckwheat groats baked with cheese.

Pirozhki, or baked dumplings with fillings as for uszka, are another common side for both thick and clear variants of borscht. Polish clear borscht may also be served with a croquette or paszteciki. A typical Polish croquette (krokiet) is made by wrapping a crêpe (thin pancake) around a filling and coating it in breadcrumbs before refrying; paszteciki (lit. 'little pâtés') are variously shaped filled hand-held pastries of yeast-raised or flaky dough. Another way to serve borscht is with a coulibiac, or a large loaf-shaped pie. Possible fillings for croquettes, paszteciki and coulibiacs include mushrooms, sauerkraut and minced meat.

== History ==
=== Precursors ===
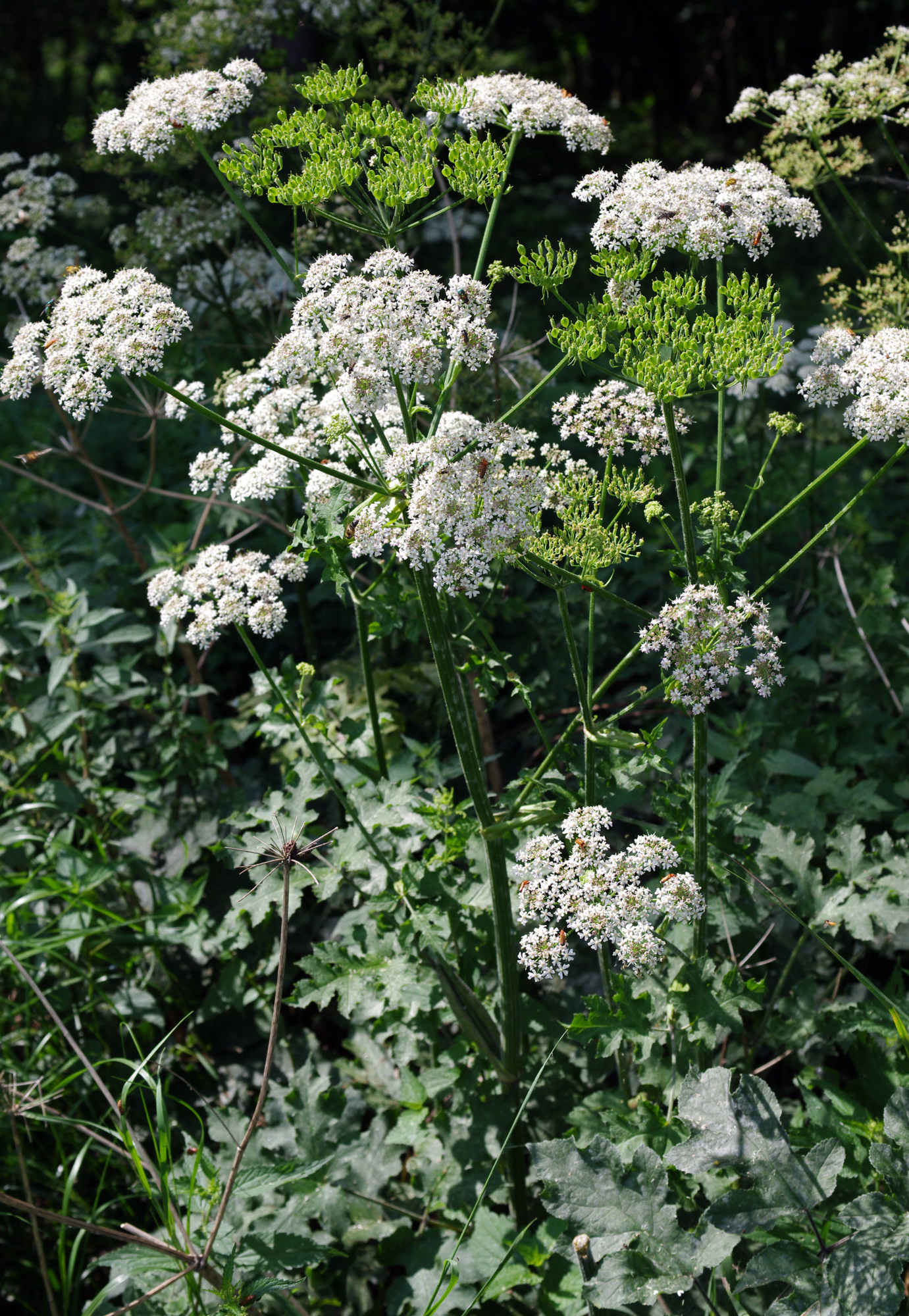
Common hogweed, originally the principal ingredient of borscht

Borscht derives from a soup originally made by the Slavs from common hogweed (Heracleum sphondylium, also known as cow parsnip), which gave the dish its Slavic name. Growing commonly in damp meadows throughout the north temperate zone, hogweed was used not only as fodder (as its English names suggest), but also for human consumption—from Eastern Europe to Siberia, to northwestern North America.

The Slavs collected hogweed in May and used its roots for stewing with meat. As for the stems, leaves, and umbels; these would be chopped, covered with water and left in a warm place to ferment. After a few days, lactic and alcoholic fermentation produced a mixture described as "something between beer and sauerkraut".

The said soup—with aforementioned fermented hogweed concoction used—was characterized by a mouth-puckering amount of sourness in its taste, while its smell was described as pungent As the Polish ethnographer Łukasz Gołębiowski wrote in 1830, "Poles have been always partial to tart dishes, which are somewhat peculiar to their homeland and vital to their health." (Note: Polish: Lubili i lubią Polacy kwaśne potrawy, ich krajowi poniekąd właściwe i zdrowiu ich potrzebne.) Simon Syrenius (Szymon Syreński), a 17th century Polish botanist, described "our Polish hogweed" (Note: Polish: barszcz nasz polski.) as a vegetable that was well known throughout Poland, Ruthenia, Lithuania and Samogitia (that is, most of the northern part of Eastern Europe), typically used for cooking a "tasty and graceful soup" (Note: Polish: smaczna i wdzięczna ... polewka.) with capon stock, eggs, sour cream and millet. More interested in the plant's medicinal properties than its culinary use, he also recommended pickled hogweed juice as a cure for fever or hangover.

One of the earliest possible mentions of borscht as a soup is found in the diary of German merchant Martin Gruneweg, who visited Kyiv in 1584. After Gruneweg reached river Borshchahivka in Kyiv's vicinity on 17 October 1584, he wrote down a local legend saying that the river was so named because there was a borscht market. However, he doubted the story noting that "Ruthenians buy borscht rarely or never, because everyone cooks their own at home as it's their staple food and drink".

Another early written reference to the Slavic hogweed soup can be found in Domostroy (Domestic Order), a 16th century Russian compendium of moral rules and homemaking advice. It recommends growing the plant "by the fence, around the whole garden, where the nettle grows", to cook a soup of it in springtime and reminds the reader to, "for the Lord's sake, share it with those in need".

Hogweed borscht was mostly a poor man's food. The soup's humble beginnings are still reflected in Polish fixed expressions, where "cheap like borscht" (Note: Polish: tanio jak barszcz; Yiddish: bilik vi borscht.) is the equivalent of "dirt cheap" (also attested as a calque in Yiddish and Canadian English), whereas adding "two mushrooms into borscht" (Note: Polish: dwa grzyby w barszcz.) is synonymous with excess. For the professors of the University of Kraków, who led a monastic way of life in the 17th century, hogweed borscht was a fasting dish which they ate regularly from Lent till Rogation days. It was uncommon on the royal table, although according to the 16th century Polish botanist Marcin of Urzędów—citing Giovanni Manardo, a court physician to the Jagiellonian kings of Hungary—the Polish-born King Vladislaus II used to have a Polish hogweed-based dish prepared for him at his court in Buda.

=== Diversification ===
With time, other ingredients were added to the soup, eventually replacing hogweed altogether, and the names borshch or barszcz became generic terms for any sour-tasting soup. In 19th century rural Poland, this term included soups made from barberries, currants, gooseberries, cranberries, celery or plums.

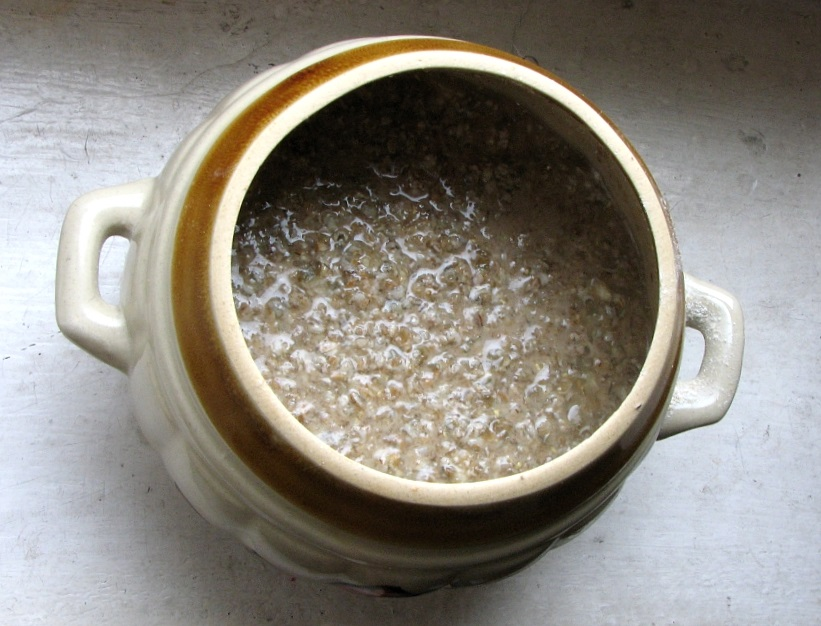
Rye meal mixed with water and left to sour is the main ingredient of Polish white borscht.

When describing the uses of common hogweed, John Gerard, a 17th century English botanist, observed that "the people of [Poland] and Lithuania [used] to make [a] drink with the decoction of this herb and leaven or some other thing made of meal, which is used instead of beer and other ordinary drink". (Note: Original spelling: The people of Polonia and Lituania vse to make drinke with the decoction of this herbe, and leuen or some other thing made of meale, which is vsed in stead of beere and other ordinarie drinke.) It may suggest that hogweed soup was on some occasions combined with a fermented mixture of water and barley flour, oatmeal or rye flour. Such soured, gelatinous flour-and-water mixture, originally known as kissel (Note: Polish: kisiel; Russian: кисель (kisel'); Ukrainian: кисiль (kysil'); today, these words refer to a sweet fruit-flavored jelly made from potato starch.) (from the Proto-Slavic root *kyslŭ, 'sour') had been already mentioned in The Tale of Bygone Years, a 12th century chronicle of Kievan Rus', and continued to be a staple of Ukrainian and Russian cooking until the middle of the 19th century. In Poland, a soup based on diluted kissel became known as either żur (from Middle High German sur, 'sour') or barszcz and later—to distinguish it from the red beetroot borscht—as barszcz biały, 'white borscht'.

The earliest known Polish recipes for borscht, written by chefs catering to Polish magnates (aristocrats), are from the late 17th century. Stanisław Czerniecki, head chef to Prince Aleksander Michał Lubomirski, included several borscht recipes in his Compendium ferculorum (A Collection of Dishes), the first cookbook published originally in Polish, in 1682. They include such sour soups as lemon borscht and "royal borscht", the latter made from assorted dried, smoked or fresh fish and fermented rye bran. A manuscript recipe collection from the Radziwiłł family court, dating back to c. 1686, contains an instruction for making hogweed borscht mixed with poppy seeds or ground almonds. As this was a Lenten dish, it was garnished, in a trompe-l'œil fashion typical of Baroque cuisine, with mock eggs made from finely chopped pike that was partly dyed with saffron and formed into oval balls. An alternative recipe for the almond borscht replaced pickled hogweed with vinegar.. In the 18th century, borscht made from fermented beetroot appeared on tables, and it was this version that gained the most popularity. It was served at the famous Thursday dinners of King Stanisław August Poniatowski, as well as during Easter breakfast at the Czartoryski princes home. In the 18th century, the term borscht man referred to someone clumsy and awkward. However, thanks to culinary experiments and increasingly sophisticated recipes, borscht gained recognition and became a permanent part of Polish tradition. The 19th-century historian Cezary Biernacki wrote: Borscht was and is the most commonplace, and with the addition of spices, the most accurate, truly Polish soup, received with great taste, indeed, and respect. The 19th century was a turning point; it was then that red borscht with dumplings began to appear on Christmas Eve tables.

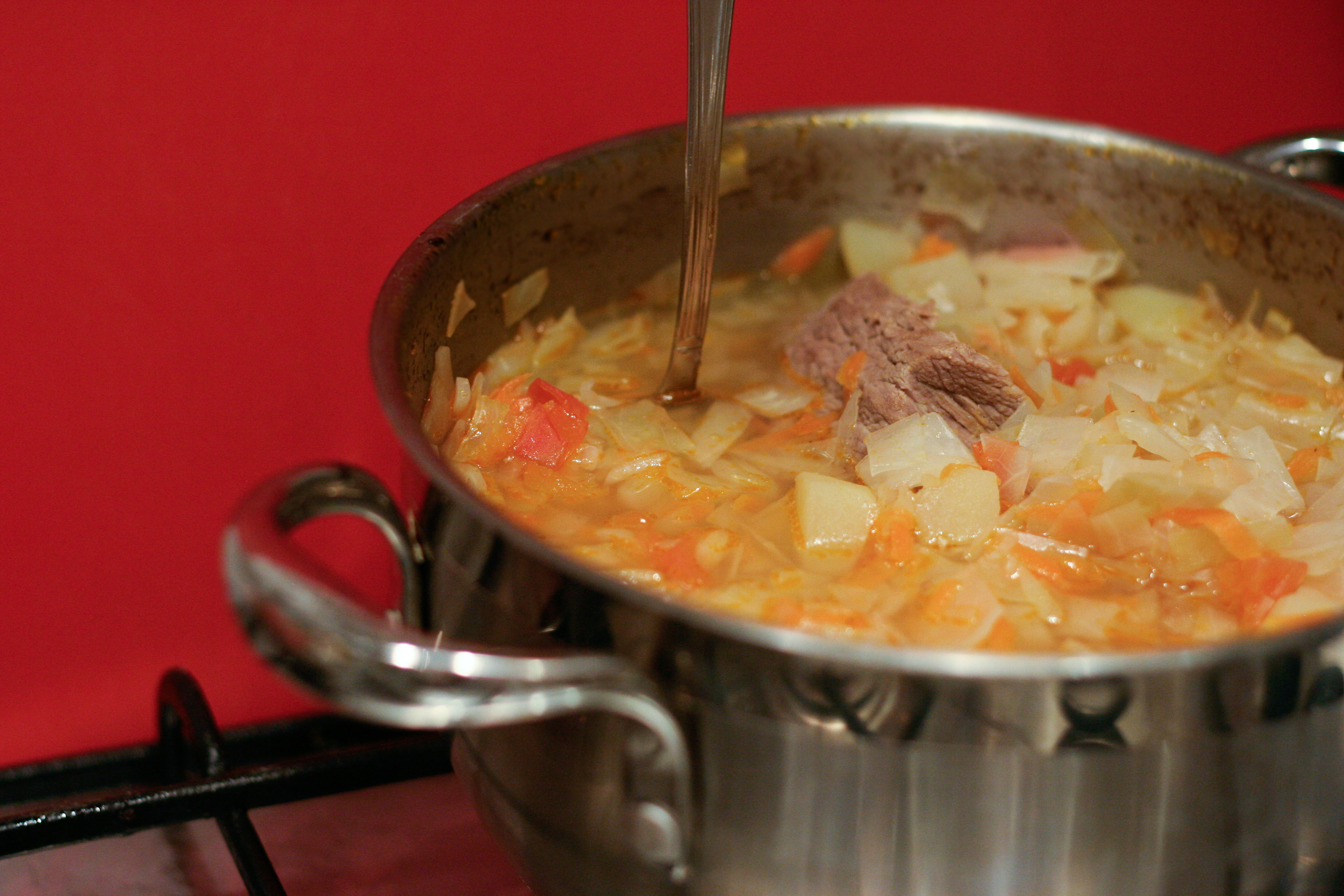
Cabbage soup attributed as "borscht" may be indistinguishable from the Russian shchi.

Borscht also evolved into a variety of sour soups to the east of Poland. Examples include onion borscht, a recipe for which was included in a 1905 Russian cookbook, and sorrel-based green borscht, which is still a popular summer soup in Ukraine and Russia. A Gift to Young Housewives by Elena Molokhovets, the best-selling Russian cookbook of the 19th century, first published in 1861, contains nine recipes for borscht, some of which are based on kvass, a traditional Slavic fermented beverage made from rye bread. Kvass-based variants were also known in Ukraine at that time; some of them were types of green borscht, while others were similar to the Russian okroshka.

Before the advent of beet-based borscht, cabbage borscht was of particular importance. Made from either fresh cabbage or sauerkraut, it could be indistinguishable from the Russian shchi. Indeed, the mid-19th century Explanatory Dictionary of the Living Great Russian Language defines borshch as sour beet or "a kind of shchi" with sour beet base. The significance of cabbage as an essential ingredient of borscht is manifest in the Ukrainian proverb, "without bread, it's no lunch; without cabbage, it's no borscht." (Note: Ukrainian: Без хліба – не обід; без капусти – не борщ (Bez khliba – ne obid; bez kapusty – ne borshch).)

=== Novel ingredients: beets, tomatoes and potatoes ===
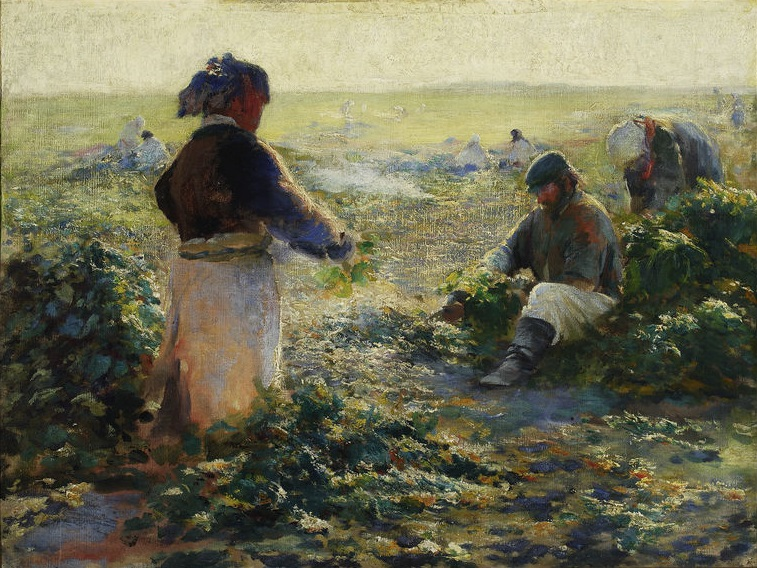
Peasants harvesting beets in what is now Ukraine, painted by Leon Wyczółkowski in 1893

Beet (Beta vulgaris), a plant native to the Mediterranean Basin, was already grown in antiquity. Only the leaves were of culinary use, as the tapered, tough, whitish and bitter-tasting root was considered unfit for human consumption. It is probably that beet greens were used in variants of green borscht long before the invention of the beetroot-based red borscht. Beet varieties with round, red, sweet taproots, known as beetroots, were not reliably reported until the 12th century and did not spread to Eastern Europe before the 16th century.

Mikołaj Rej, a Polish Renaissance poet and moralist, included the earliest known Polish recipe for pickled beetroots in his 1568 book, Life of an Honest Man. It would later evolve into ćwikła, or chrain mit burik, a beet-and-horseradish relish popular in Polish and Jewish cuisines. Rej also recommended the "very tasty brine" (Note: Polish: rosołek barzo smaczny.) left over from beetroot pickling, which was an early version of beet sour. The sour found some applications in Polish folk medicine as a cure for hangover and—mixed with honey—as a sore throat remedy.

It may never be known who first thought of using beet sour to flavor borscht, which also gave the soup its now-familiar red color. One of the earliest mentions of borscht with pickled beets comes from Russian ethnographer Andrey Meyer, who wrote in his 1781 book that people in Ukraine make fermented red beets with Acanthus, which they in turn use to cook their borscht. The book "Description of the Kharkiv Governorate" of 1785, which describes the food culture of the Ukrainians, says that borscht was the most consumed food, cooked from beets and cabbage with various other herbal spices and millet, on sour kvass; it was always made with pork lard or beef lard, on holidays with lamb or poultry, and sometimes with game. Jerzy Samuel Bandtkie's Polish-German dictionary published in 1806 was the first to define barszcz as a tart soup made from pickled beetroots.

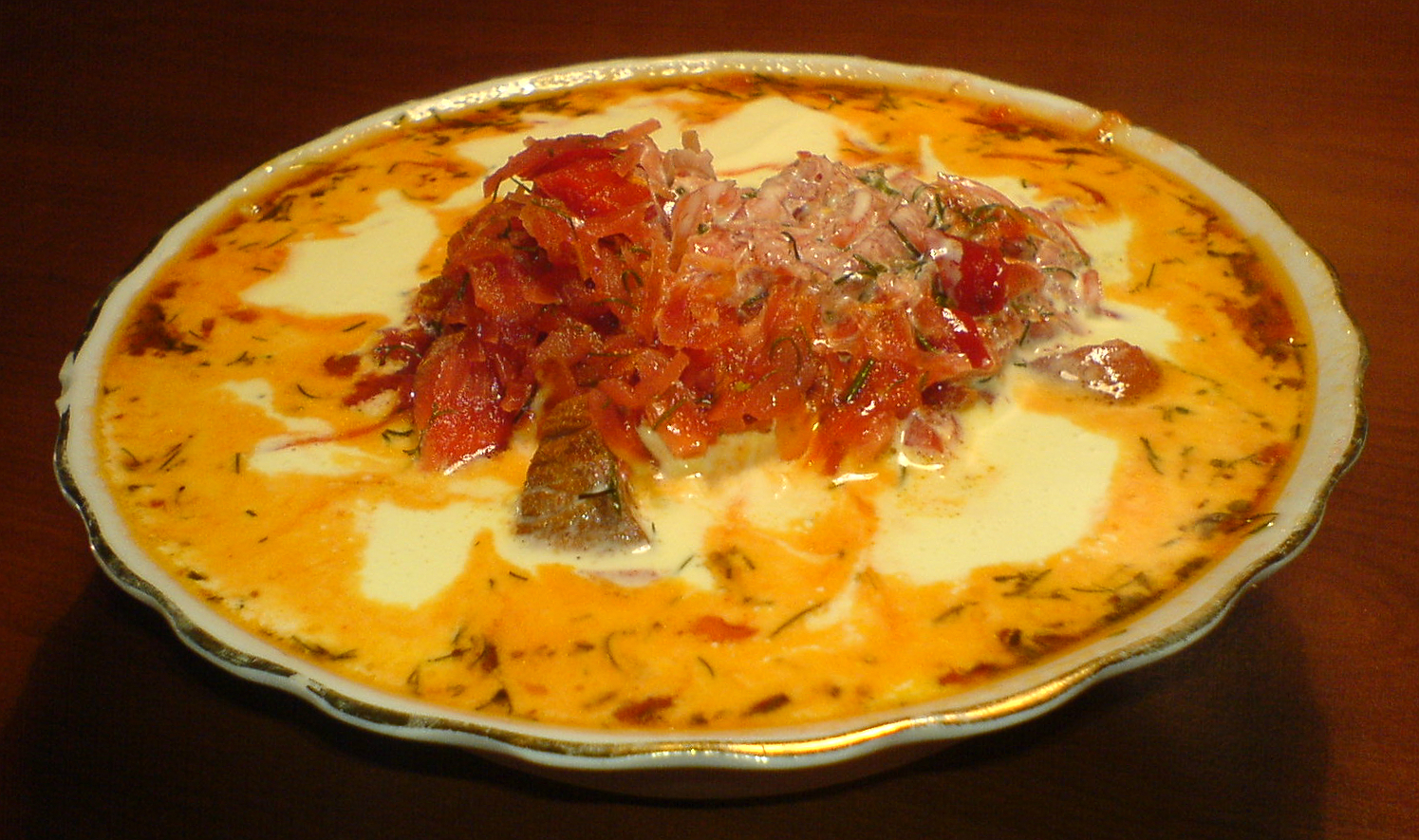
The addition of tomatoes may give borscht an orange tinge instead of the purplish red imparted by beetroots.

The fact that certain 19th century Russian and Polish cookbooks, such as Handbook of the Experienced Russian Housewife (1842) by Yekaterina Avdeyeva and The Lithuanian Cook (1854) by Wincenta Zawadzka, refer to beetroot-based borscht as "Little Russian borscht" (Note: Polish: barszcz małorosyjski; Russian: борщ малороссийский (borshch malorossiysky).) (where "Little Russian" is a term used at the time for ethnic Ukrainians under imperial Russian rule) suggests that this innovation took place in Ukraine, whose soils and climate are particularly well suited to beet cultivation. Ukrainian legends, probably of 19th century origin, attribute the invention of beetroot borscht either to Zaporozhian Cossacks, serving in the Polish army, on their way to break the siege of Vienna in 1683, or to Don Cossacks, serving in the Russian army, while laying siege to Azov in 1695.

Spanish conquistadors brought potatoes and tomatoes from the Americas to Europe in the 16th century, but these vegetables only became commonly grown and consumed in Eastern Europe in the 19th century. Eventually, both became staples of peasant diet and essential ingredients of Ukrainian and Russian borscht. Potatoes replaced turnips in borscht recipes, and tomatoes—fresh, canned or paste—took over from beet sour as the source of tartness. The turnip is rarely found in modern recipes, and even then, together with potatoes. In Ukraine, beet sour and tomatoes were both used for some time until the latter ultimately prevailed during the last third of the 19th century. Other innovation during the 19th century included the addition of powdered white mushrooms to borshch, which reportedly stemmed from Greek merchants from Nizhyn.

=== Haute cuisine ===
In Ukraine borshch was popularized as a national dish by the 19th century, when many recipes for cooking borshch had become known, some of which would contain more than 20 ingredients. Among the rich it was not unusual to have several varieties of the dish during one meal. One recipe preserved from that time includes ingredients such as cardamom, eggs, mushrooms and cherry.

Russian and Polish aristocrats used to employ celebrated French chefs, who later presented their dishes as foreign curiosity back in France. One of the first French chefs to do so was Marie-Antoine Carême, who worked briefly for Emperor Alexander I in 1819. In his take on borscht, the original Russian soup served only as inspiration for an extravagant haute cuisine dish with an air of eastern exoticism. Apart from vegetables and beet sour, his recipe calls for a roast chicken, a fried chicken, a duck, a piece of veal, an oxtail, a marrow bone, one pound of bacon, and six large sausages, and suggests serving with beef quenelles, deviled eggs and croûtons.

Auguste Escoffier, Carême's apprentice, who was mostly fascinated by the soup's vivid ruby-red color, simplified his master's recipe, while also securing the place of potage bortsch (lit. 'borscht soup') in French cuisine. Urbain Dubois and Émile Bernard, both of whom had been employed at Polish aristocratic courts, presented borscht to the French public as a Polish soup; their cookbook, La cuisine classique, published in 1856, contains a borscht recipe under the descriptive name, potage au jus de betteraves à la polonaise (lit. 'Polish-style beet-juice soup'), which had been changed to potage barsch à la polonaise by the third edition in 1868. In 1867, beetroot borscht was served, along with herrings, sturgeon, coulibiac, Pozharsky cutlets and vinaigrette salad, at a Russian-themed dinner at the International Exposition in Paris, strengthening its international association with Russian culture.

=== Global spread ===
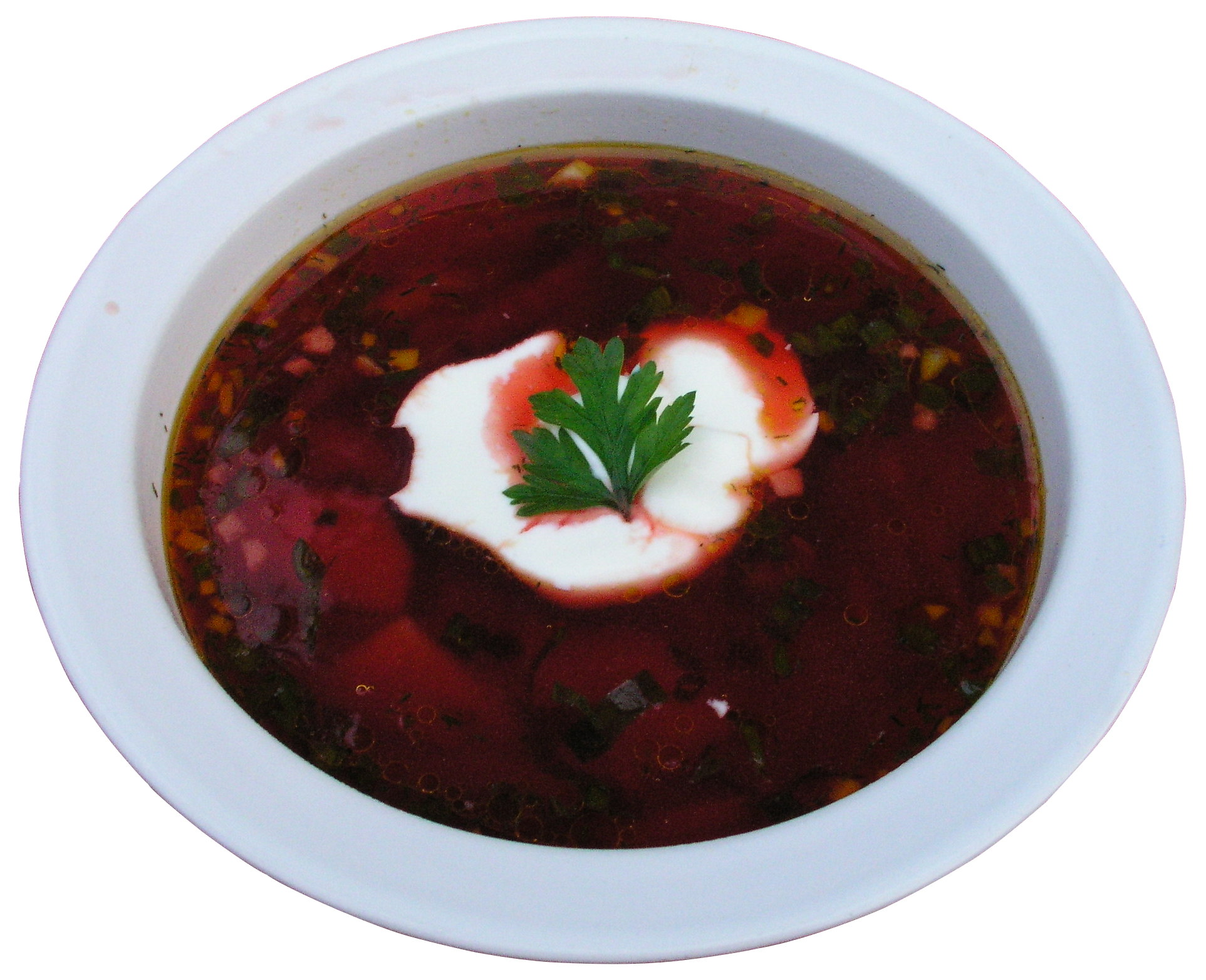
A modern bowl of dark-red borscht garnished with a dollop of sour cream and a parsley leaf. Note the bubbles of oil, making borscht close to vinegret.

Over the course of the 19th and 20th centuries, borscht's popularity spread beyond its Slavic homeland, largely due to such factors as territorial expansion of the Russian Empire, Russia's growing political clout and cultural stature, and waves of emigration out of the country. As Russia grew to cover most of northern and central Eurasia, borscht was introduced to the cuisines of various peoples inhabiting the territories both within and adjacent to the empire, from Finland to the Caucasus and Iran, to Central Asia and China, to Alaska (Russian America).

Borscht's westward expansion was less successful; Germans used to scoff at the soup along with other East European fare.

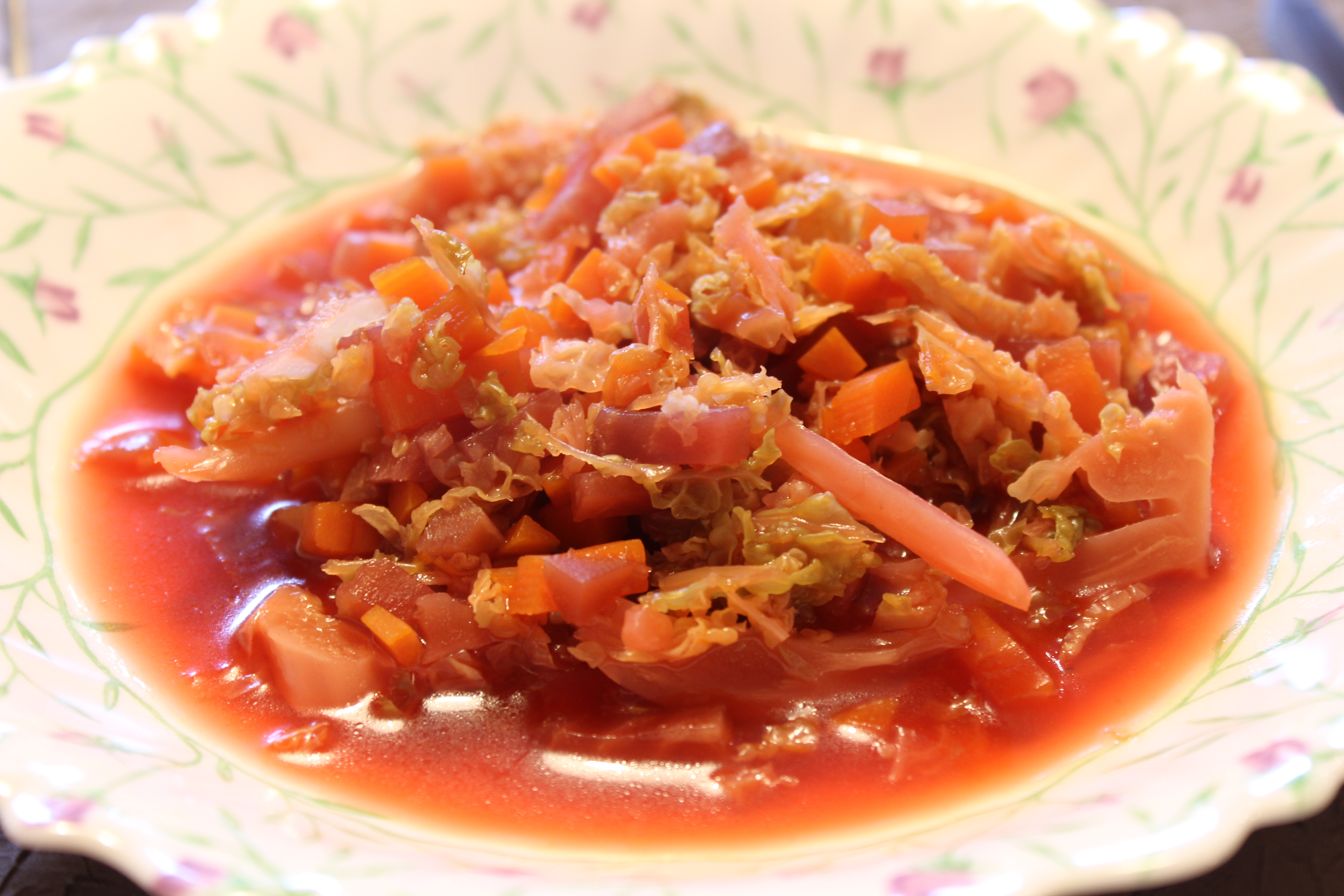
Ukrainian beet-and-cabbage borscht

Mass migration from the Russian Empire to North America—initially mostly by members of persecuted religious minorities—was instrumental in bringing borscht across the Atlantic. Jews from the Pale of Settlement, an area that stretched along the western edges of the Russian Empire and included much of present-day Ukraine, brought with them the Ukrainian variety of borscht with beetroot.

The earliest waves of migration, however, occurred at a time when cabbage-based borscht was still the dominant variant of the soup in at least parts of Russia. The Mennonites, who began arriving in Canada and the United States from Russia's Volga region in the 1870s, still eschew beetroots in their borscht; instead, Mennonite varieties include Komst Borscht (with cabbage or sauerkraut) and Somma Borscht (sorrel-based "summer borscht"). According to the Jewish Encyclopedia published in 1906, cabbage-based kraut borscht was also more popular than the beet-based variant in American Jewish cuisine at the time.

In the 1930s, when most American hotels refused to accept Jewish guests due to widespread anti-Semitism, New York Jews began flocking to Jewish-owned resorts in the Catskill Mountains for their summer vacations. The area grew into a major center of Jewish entertainment, with restaurants offering all-you-can-eat Ashkenazi Jewish fare, including copious amounts of borscht. Grossinger's, one of the largest resorts, served borscht throughout the day, every day of the year. The region became known, initially in derision, as the "Borscht Belt", reinforcing the popular association between borscht and American Jewish culture. As most visitors arrived in the summertime, the borscht was typically served cold. Marc Gold was one of its largest suppliers, producing 1,750 short tons (1,590 tonnes) a year in his business's heyday. Gold's borscht consists of puréed beetroots seasoned with sugar, salt and citric acid; it is usually blended with sour cream and served as a refreshing beverage, more aptly described as a "beet smoothie". Such type of "purplish, watery broth" is, according to Nikolai Burlakoff, author of The World of Russian Borsch, "associated in America with borsch, in general, and Jewish borsch in particular."

=== Borscht in the USSR ===
In the Soviet Union, borscht was one of the most popular everyday dishes. It was described in 2008 by journalist James Meek as "the common denominator of the Soviet kitchen, the dish that tied together ... the high table of the Kremlin and the meanest canteen in the boondocks of the Urals, ... the beetroot soup that pumped like the main artery through the kitchens of the east Slav lands." Among Soviet leaders, the Ukrainian-born Leonid Brezhnev was especially partial to borscht, which his wife continued to personally cook for him even after they had moved into the Kremlin.

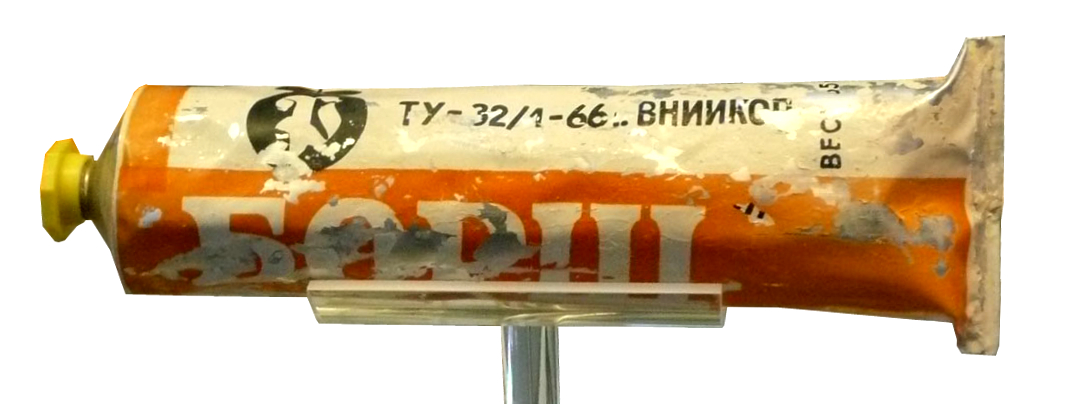
Tubed borscht as space food

The soup has even played a role in the Soviet space program. In March 1961, as part of a communications equipment test, a pre-recorded recipe for borscht was broadcast from the Korabl-Sputnik 4 spacecraft. The craft, carrying animals and a mannequin, had been launched into low Earth orbit in preparation for crewed space flights.

All ingredients for the space borscht (which include beef, beetroots, cabbage, potatoes, carrots, onions, parsley root, and tomato paste) were cooked separately, then combined one by one in strictly controlled order, sterilized, packed into tubes, sealed airtight and autoclaved. In the 1970s, the tubes were replaced with packages of rehydratable freeze-dried borscht with regular-size bits of cooked vegetables.

An article on borscht in the Soviet-era book Entsyclopedia Domashnego Hozyaystva (lit. 'Encyclopedia of Housekeeping') suggests to make a soup with beets, other vegetables, and tomato purée as a "borscht" in general. Its recipe of meat borscht also suggests adding vinegar to one's taste.

== In culture ==
=== As a ritual dish ===
Borscht is often associated with its role in religious traditions of various denominations (Eastern Orthodox, Greek and Roman Catholic, and Jewish) that are common in Eastern Europe. In East Slavic countries, "memorial borscht" (Note: Russian: поминальный борщ (pominalny borshch).) is served as the first course at a post-funeral wake. According to a traditional belief, the soul of the departed either feeds on or is carried up to heaven by puffs of steam rising from bowls of borscht and other hot dishes, such as blini, porridge, boiled potatoes or freshly baked bread. In the region of Polesye, straddling the Belarusian-Ukrainian border, the same steaming-hot dishes, including borscht, are given as an offering to the souls of deceased ancestors during the annual semi-pagan remembrance ceremony known as Dzyady or Forefathers' Night.

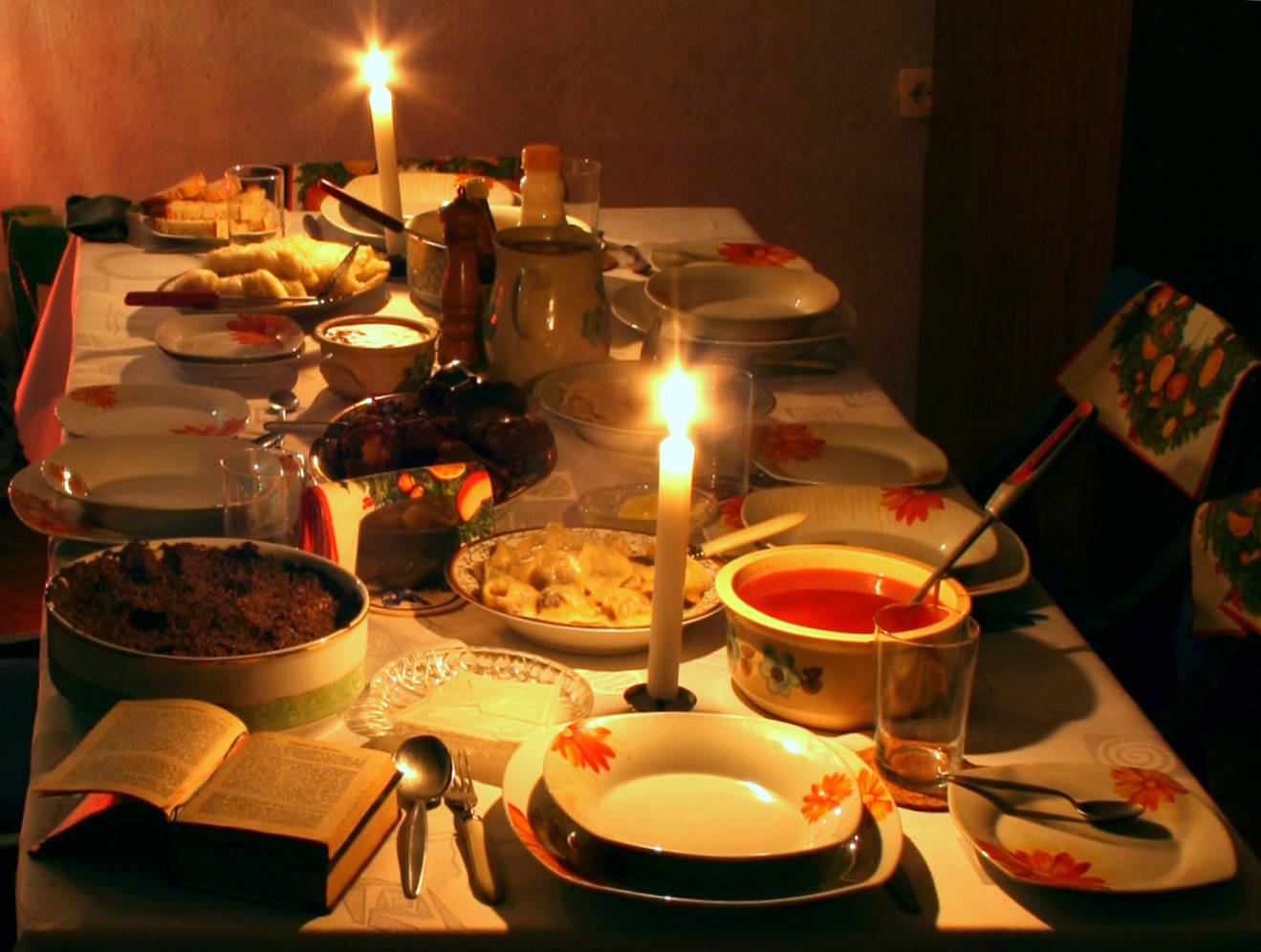
A tureen of clear borscht among other dishes on a Polish Christmas Eve table

In Poland and Ukraine, borscht is usually one of the dishes served at a Christmas Eve dinner. Celebrated after the first star has appeared in the sky on December 24 (Roman Catholic) or January 6 (Greek Catholic), it is a meal which is at the same time festive and fasting, a multicourse affair (traditionally, with twelve distinct dishes) that excludes ingredients of land-animal origin. Christmas Eve borscht is, therefore, either vegetarian or based on fish stock and is not typically mixed with sour cream. In Ukraine, the soup contains vegetables that are sautéed in vegetable oil rather than lard, as well as beans and mushrooms. It may also be thickened with wheat flour dry-roasted in a pan instead of the usual roux. The Polish version of Christmas Eve borscht is a clear ruby-red broth. Both Ukrainian and Polish variants are often served with uszka.

While Christmas in Poland is traditionally linked to red borscht, Lent—the fasting period that leads up to Easter—is associated with a meatless version of white borscht, or żur. Youths used to celebrate Holy Saturday, the last day of the fast, with a mock "funeral" of the white borscht, in which a pot of the soup was either buried in the ground or broken, sometimes—to the crowd's amusement—while being carried by an unsuspecting boy on his head. On the next day, the white borscht would reappear on the Easter table, but this time, in its more coveted, meat-based guise with sausage, bacon and eggs.

In Eastern European Ashkenazi Jewish tradition, vegetarian borscht served with sour cream and boiled potatoes on the side, known as peysakhdiker borsht, is considered an essential dish during the Passover period. As the holiday is observed in spring (March or April), the preparation of Passover borscht used to provide an opportunity to use up the beet sour left over from pickled beetroots that had been consumed during winter, remaining potatoes that had been stored throughout the winter and sour cream that was readily available in the new calving season. Cold borscht blended with sour cream is also popular on Shavuot (Feast of Weeks), a holiday customarily associated with dairy foods, observed in late May or early June. Seudah Shlishit, or the third meal of the Shabbat, often includes borscht as well.

In 2022, the United Nations Educational, Scientific, and Cultural Organization (UNESCO) announced that it had placed "Culture of Ukrainian borscht cooking" on the List of Intangible Cultural Heritage in Need of Urgent Safeguarding. UNESCO noted that Borscht cooking was "also practised in communities in the broader region", and its designation "does not imply exclusivity, nor ownership, of the heritage concerned". Instead it recognized the significant cultural importance of Borscht to Ukrainians and the need to safeguard this culture, particularly in light of Russia's invasion of Ukraine. According to the festival blog of the Smithsonian Institution, "The designation by the international cultural authority was widely seen as a landmark decision in the ongoing cultural dispute between the two countries on borshch’s true country of origin."

=== As an ethnic dish ===
In its currently most popular, beet-based version, borscht most probably originated in what is now Ukraine. Borscht's role as a staple of everyday Ukrainian diet is reflected in the Ukrainian saying, "borscht and porridge are our food" (Note: Ukrainian: Борщ та каша – їжа наша (Borshch ta kasha – yizha nasha).) (compare the equivalent Russian saying, where borscht is replaced with shchi (Note: Russian: Щи да каша – пища наша (Shchi da kasha – pishcha nasha).)). The hearty soup in which the beetroot is just one of sundry vegetables, as opposed to the typically Polish clear beet broth, is still known in Poland as "Ukrainian borscht". (Note: Polish: barszcz ukraiński.)

Borscht is associated with and claimed by several ethnic groups, especially Ukrainians, Russians, Poles, Lithuanians and Ashkenazi Jews, as their own national or ethnic dish and cultural icon. Such gastronationalistic claims are not necessarily mutually exclusive, as the soup's history predates the emergence in Eastern Europe of modern nation states with their ever-shifting borders. Borscht, in the words of Burlakoff, "is perfectly suited to a global culture". He describes it as "a global phenomenon", in which "local variants are so numerous and diverse that it is hard sometimes for a non-specialist to grasp that any single example of it is something that is part of a unified tradition". In his view, borscht "is an almost perfect example of ... 'glocalization'—a phenomenon that is global in distribution but reflective of local needs and ways in its variants and adaptation; ... a highly localized product that became globalized, and in the process adapted to conditions other than the original ones."

However, according to Irina Perianova, a Russian linguist and anthropologist, "people tend to be very proprietal about their food and proud of it." Perianova offers competing Russian and Ukrainian views on the origin and ingredients of borscht as an example of "a common connection between culinary and territorial claims", which results in the culinary area turning into "a battlefield generating and proliferating all kinds of myths". In 2020 Ukraine began the process to have borscht recognised as an element of the country's intangible cultural heritage, an initiative supported by chefs and food writers such as Marianna Dushar.

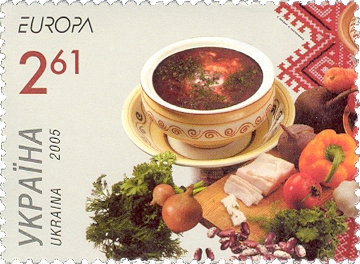
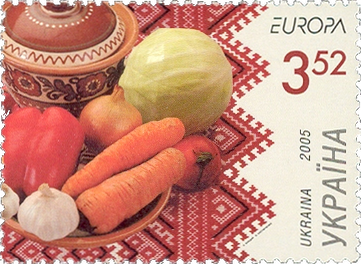
A bowl of borscht together with its usual ingredients featured on Ukrainian postage stamps

In the Soviet Union, government-sponsored cookbooks, such as The Book of Tasty and Healthy Food (1939) curated by Anastas Mikoyan, and Cookery and Directory of Recipes and Culinary Production, promoted a unified Soviet cuisine with standardized and nutritionally "rational" versions of traditional dishes. The same cooking techniques and recipes were taught in culinary vocational schools throughout the country, establishing a common cooking style in Soviet cafés and restaurants. Though inspired by the cuisines of the country's various ethnic groups, many recipes were presented as part of an overall Soviet heritage, disassociated from their individual geographic origins.

By many people both inside and outside the Soviet Union, borscht was increasingly seen not as an ethnic Ukrainian soup, but as a Soviet or—metonymically—Russian dish. This approach was criticized by William Pokhlyobkin, a Russian food writer, who unequivocally described beet-based borscht as one of the "dishes of Ukrainian cookery" which "have entered the menu of international cuisine". (Note: Russian: некоторые блюда украинской кухни, например борщи и вареники, вошли в меню международной кухни.) "One could understand", he wrote, "and forgive foreigners for calling borscht or varenyky Russian national dishes, but when it turns out that they gleaned this information from Soviet cookbooks or from restaurant menus, one becomes embarrassed for our authors and chefs, who popularize the national cuisines of our peoples [that is, the ethnic groups of the Soviet Union] with such ignorance." (Note: Russian: То, что иностранцы называют борщ или вареники русскими национальными блюдами, еще можно понять и извинить, но когда выясняется, что эти сведения они почерпнули из советских кулинарных книг или из меню ресторанов, становится стыдно за наших авторов и мастеров общепита, так безграмотно пропагандирующих национальную кухню наших народов.)

== See also ==
- Three grand soups – Classification of soups in Japan
- Shchi – Russian-style cabbage soup, some variants of the dish may contain beets
- Cabbage soup – Soup dish, kapusniak/kapustnica variants of cabbage soup are made sour
- Borscht Belt – Cultural region of New York, US – a popular vacation spot for New York City Jews from the 1920s through the 1960s

== Sources ==
=== Secondary ===
- Christian, David (April 1994). "Classic Russian Cooking: Elena Molokhovets' A Gift to Young Housewives". Russian Review. 53 (2): 306. doi:10.2307/130837. JSTOR 130837.
- Dembińska, Maria (1999). Weaver, William Woys (ed.). Food and Drink in Medieval Poland: Rediscovering a Cuisine of the Past. Philadelphia: University of Pennsylvania Press. ISBN 0-8122-3224-0.
- Fertig, Judith M. (2011). Prairie Home Cooking: 400 Recipes that Celebrate the Bountiful Harvests, Creative Cooks, and Comforting Foods of the American Heartland. Boston: Houghton Mifflin Harcourt. ISBN 978-1-55832-144-1.
- Garber, Megan (2013-03-28). "The Doll That Helped the Soviets Beat the U.S. to Space". The Atlantic.
- Hercules, Olia (2017-12-07). "Let Me Count the Ways of Making Borscht". The New Yorker.
- Kafka, Barbara (1998). Soup: A Way of Life. Artisan Books. p. 176. ISBN 978-1-57965-125-1.
- Kuhnlein, Harriet V.; Turner, Nancy J. (1986). "Cow-parsnip (Heracleum lanatum Michx.): an indigenous vegetable of native people of northwestern North America" (PDF). Journal of Ethnobiology. 6 (2): 309–324.
- Lagnado, Lucette (2011-06-28). "A Family Named Gold Tries to Add Cool to a Soup That's the Color Purple". The Wall Street Journal.
- Meek, James (2008-03-15). "The story of borshch". The Guardian.
- Morel, Linda (2008-05-15). "Cold soups for Shavuot". Jewish Telegraphic Agency.
- Mack, Glenn Randall; Surina, Asele (2005). Food Culture in Russia and Central Asia. Greenwood Publishing Group. ISBN 978-0-313-32773-5. ISSN 1545-2638.
- Perianova, Irina (2012). "Culinary Myths of the Soviet Union". In Ratiani, Irma (ed.). Totalitarianism and Literary Discourse: 20th Century Experience. Cambridge Scholars Publishing. pp. 160–175. ISBN 978-1-4438-3445-2.
- Petrosian, Irina; Underwood, David (2006). Armenian Food: Fact, Fiction & Folklore. Bloomington: Lulu. ISBN 978-1-4116-9865-9.
- Rothstein, Halina; Rothstein, Robert A. (1998). "Food in Yiddish and Slavic Folk Culture: A Comparative/Contrastive View". In Greenspoon, Leonard Jay (ed.). Yiddish Language & Culture: Then & Now (pdf). Studies in Jewish Civilization. Vol. 9. Omaha: Creighton University Press. pp. 305–328. ISBN 1-881871-25-8. ISSN 1070-8510.
- Schultze, Sydney (2000). Culture and Customs of Russia. Greenwood Publishing Group. ISBN 978-0-313-31101-7.
- Small, Ernest (2009). Top 100 Food Plants: The World's Most Important Culinary Crops. Knoxville: NRC Research Press. ISBN 978-0-660-19858-3.
- Strybel, Robert; Strybel, Maria (2005) [1993]. Polish Heritage Cookery. New York: Hippocrene Books. ISBN 0-7818-1124-4.
- Szymula, Elzbieta (2012). "Polish Diet". In Thaker, Aruna; Barton, Arlene (eds.). Multicultural Handbook of Food, Nutrition and Dietetics. Wiley-Blackwell. pp. 277–295. ISBN 978-1-4051-7358-2.
- Volokh, Anne; Manus, Mavis (1983). The Art of Russian Cuisine. Macmillan. ISBN 978-0-02-622090-3.

==== Other languages ====
- Artyukh, Lidiya (1977). Ukrainska narodna kulynariia Українська народна кулинарія [Ukrainian Folk Cuisine] (in Ukrainian). Kyyiv: Naukova dumka.
- Artyukh, Lidiya (2006). Tradytsiina ukrainska kukhnia v narodnomu kalendari Традиційна українська кухня в народному календарі [Traditional Ukrainian Cuisine in the Folk Calendar] (in Ukrainian). Kyiv: Baltiya-Druk. ISBN 966-8137-24-8.
- Dumanowski, Jarosław (31 January 2013). "Barszcz, żur i post" [Borscht, sour rye soup, and fast]. naTemat (in Polish).
- Dumanowski, Jarosław (22 May 2014). "Klasyczny barszcz: Francuscy mistrzowie o polskiej kuchni" [Classic borscht: French chefs about Polish cuisine]. naTemat (in Polish).
- Gołębiowski, Łukasz (1830). Domy i dwory [Houses and Manors] (in Polish). Warszawa: N. Glücksberg.
- Guboglo, Mikhail Nikolayevich; Simchenko, Yury Borisovich (1992). Ukraintsy: Istoriko-etnografichesky ocherk traditsionnoy kultury Украинцы: Историко-этнографический очерк традиционной культуры [Ukrainians: A Historical Ethnographic Essay of the Traditional Culture] (in Russian). Moskva: Rossiyskaya akademiya nauk, Institut etnologii i antropologii im. N.N Miklukho-Maklaya.
- Gurko, Alexandra V.; Chakvin, Igor V.; Kasperovich, Galina I., eds. (2010). Etnokulturnye protsessy Vostochnogo Polesya v proshlom i nastoyashchem Этнокультурные процессы Восточного Полесья в прошлом и настоящем [Ethnocultural Processes of Eastern Polesye in the Past and Present] (in Russian). Institut iskusstvovedeniya, etnografii i folklora imeni K. Krapivy NAN Belarusi. ISBN 978-985-08-1229-2.
- Karbowiak, Antoni (1900). Obiady profesorów Uniw. Jagiellońskiego w XVI. i XVII. wieku [Luncheons of Jagiellonian University Professors in the 16th–17th Centuries] (in Polish). Kraków: Tow. Miłośników Historyi i Zabytków Krakowa.
- Lepiavko, Serhii (3 November 2020). "Pro ukrainskyi borshch vid 1584 r. z istorychnymy prypravamy" Про український борщ від 1584 р. з історичними приправами [Of Ukrainian borscht after 1584 with historical seasonings]. Istorychna Pravda (in Ukrainian).
- Łozińska, Maja; Łoziński, Jan (2013). Historia polskiego smaku: kuchnia, stół, obyczaje [History of Polish Taste: Kitchen, Table, Customs] (in Polish). Warszawa: Wydawnictwo Naukowe PWN. ISBN 978-83-7705-269-3.
- Łuczaj, Łukasz (2012). "Brzozowy sok, "czeremsza" i zielony barszcz – ankieta etnobotaniczna wśród botaników ukraińskich" [Birch sap, ramsons and green borsch – an ethnobotanical survey among Ukrainian botanists] (PDF). Etnobiologia Polska (in Polish). 2. Wojaszówka: Zakład Ekotoksykologii, Zamiejscowy Wydział Biotechnologii, Uniwersytet Rzeszowski: 15–22. ISSN 2083-6228. Archived from the original (PDF) on 2020-03-27.
- Łuczaj, Łukasz (2013). Dzika kuchnia [Wild Cuisine] (in Polish). Warszawa: Nasza Księgarnia. ISBN 978-83-10-12378-7.
- Majkowski, Hilary (1932). Wyczółkowski 1852–1932 (in Polish). Poznań: Rolnicza Druk. i Księg. Nakładowa. Pages unnumbered.
- Matyukhina, Yuliya (2013). Russkaya dieta Русская диета [The Russian Diet] (in Russian). Nauchnaya Kniga. ISBN 978-5-457-52538-2.
- Mazitova, Hanna (2005-12-22). "Chyi borshch?" Чий борщ? [Whose borscht?]. Den' (in Ukrainian). Ukrayinska Pres-Grupa.
- Panek, Kazimierz (1905). Mikroby oraz chemizm kiśnienia barszczu [Microbes and Chemistry of Borscht Fermentation] (in Polish). Kraków: Akademia Umiejętności.
- Pokhlebkin, William Vasilyevich (2004) [1978]. Natsionalnye kukhni nashikh narodov Национальные кухни наших народов [National Cuisines of Our Peoples] (in Russian). Moskva: Tsentrpoligraf. ISBN 5-9524-0718-8.
- Rostafiński, Józef (1916). O nazwach i użytku ćwikły, buraków i barszczu [Names and Uses of Chards, Beets and Hogweed] (in Polish). Kraków: Akademia Umiejętności.
- Vinogradova, Lyudmila; Levkievskaya, Yelena (2012). Narodnaya demonologiya Polesya: Publikatsii tekstov v zapisyakh 80–90-kh gg. XX veka. Tom II: Demonologizatsiya umershikh lyudey Народная демонология Полесья: Публикации текстов в записях 80–90-х гг. XX века. Том II: Демонологизация умерших людей [Folk Demonology of Polesye: Publication of field notes from the 1980s and 90s. Vol. 2: Demonization of the Dead] (in Russian). Moskva: Rukopisnye pamyatniki Drevney Rusi. ISBN 978-5-9551-0606-9. ISSN 1726-135X.
- Zhou, Sili; Sun, Yanru (2012-08-20). "Yībǎi gè Shànghǎi rén yǒu yībǎi zhǒng luó sòng tāng" 一百个上海人有一百种罗宋汤 [One hundred types of borscht for one hundred Shanghainese]. Shanghai Morning Post (in Simplified Chinese). Archived from the original on 2017-04-01 – via Sina.

=== Primary or self-published ===
- Avdeyeva, Yekaterina Alekseyevna (1846) [1842]. Ruchnaya kniga russkoy opytnoy khozyayki Ручная книга русской опытной хозяйки [Handbook of the Experienced Russian Housewife] (in Russian). Sankt-Peterburg: Sveshnikov.
- Burlakoff, Nikolai (2013). The World of Russian Borsch: Explorations of Memory, People, History, Cookbooks & Recipes. North Charleston, SC: Createspace Independent Pub. ISBN 978-1-4840-2740-0.
- Czerniecki, Stanisław (1682). Compendium ferculorum, albo Zebranie potraw [A Collection of Dishes] (in Polish). Kraków: Drukarnia Jerzego i Mikołaja Schedlów.
- Dubois, Urbain; Bernard, Émile (1868) [1856]. La cuisine classique : études pratiques, raisonnées et démonstratives de l'École française appliquée au service à la russe [Classic Cuisine: Practical, Systematic and Demonstrative Studies of the French School of Russian Table Service] (in French). Paris: E. Dentu.
- Dumanowski, Jarosław; Jankowski, Rafał, eds. (2011). Moda bardzo dobra smażenia różnych konfektów [A Very Good Way of Frying Various Confections]. Monumenta Poloniae Culinaria (in Polish). Vol. 2. Warszawa: Muzeum Pałac w Wilanowie. ISBN 978-83-60959-18-3.
- Gerard, John (1636). Johnson, Thomas (ed.). The Herball Or Generall Historie of Plantes: Very Much Enlarged and Amended by Thomas Johnson Citizen and Apothecarye of London. Vol. 2. Adam Islip Joice Norton and Richard Whitakers.
- "Gold's Borscht, 24 fl oz, (Pack of 6)". Walmart.
- Kulinariya Кулинария [Cookery] (in Russian). Moskva: Gostorgizdat. 1955–58.
- Kuroń, Maciej (2004). Kuchnia polska: Kuchnia Rzeczypospolitej wielu narodów [Polish Cuisine: Cuisine of a Commonwealth of Many Nations] (in Polish). Czarna Owca. ISBN 83-89763-25-7.
- Marcin z Urzędowa (1595). Herbarz Polski, to iest o przyrodzeniu zioł y drzew rozmaitych, y innych rzeczy do lekarztw nalezących [Polish Herbal, or Of the Complexion of Various Herbs and Trees, and Other Things of which Medicines Comprise] (in Polish). Kraków: Drukarnia Łazarzowa.
- Meyer, Andrey (1781). Botanicheskoy podrobnoy slovar, ili Travnik Ботанической подробной словарь, или Травникъ [Detailed Botanical Dictionary, or Herbal] (in Russian). Moskva: Universitetskaya Tipografia N. Novikova.
- Molokhovets, Elena (1998) [1861]. Classic Russian Cooking: Elena Molokhovets' A Gift to Young Housewives. Translated by Toomre, Joyce Stetson. Indiana University Press. ISBN 978-0-253-21210-8.
- Pirko, V.O.; Hurzhii, O.I.; Sokhan, P.S., eds. (1991). "Topohrafichnyi opys Kharkivskoho namisnytstva 1785 r." Топографічний опис Харківського намісництва 1785 р. [Topographical description of the Kharkiv Governorate in 1785]. Opysy Kharkivskoho namisnytstva kintsia XVIII ct Описи Харківського намісництва кінця XVIII ст. [Descriptions of the Kharkiv Governorate at the end of the 18th century] (in Russian). Kyiv: Naukova Dumka. ISBN 5-12-002041-0.
- Rej, Mikołaj (1567). Żywot człowieka poczciwego [Life of an Honest Man] (in Polish).
- Syrennius, Simon (1613). Zielnik [Herbal] (in Polish). Cracovia: Drukarnia Bazylego Skalskiego.
- Szymanderska, Hanna (2010). Kuchnia polska: Potrawy regionalne [Polish Cuisine: Regional Dishes] (in Polish). Warszawa: Świat Książki. ISBN 978-83-7799-631-7.
- The Epicure's Year Book and Table Companion. London: Bradbury, Evans, & Co. 1868. p. 83.
- Vedernikov, Andrey (2015-11-25). "Kosmovalyuta i borshch iz tuby: chto yedyat kosmonavty" Космовалюта и борщ из тубы: что едят космонавты [Space currency and tubed borscht: what cosmonauts eat]. mos.ru (Interview) (in Russian).
- Zawadzka, W.A.L. (1913) [1854]. Kucharka litewska [The Lithuanian Cook] (in Polish). Wilno: Józef Zawadzki.

=== Reference works ===
- Auzias, Dominique; Labourdette, Jean-Paul (2012). Roumanie 2012–2013 [Romania 2012–2013] (in French). Paris: Petit Futé. ISBN 978-2-7469-6376-4.
- Barber, Katherine, ed. (2004). The Canadian Oxford Dictionary (2nd ed.). Oxford University Press. doi:10.1093/acref/9780195418163.001.0001. ISBN 978-0-19-541816-3.
- Dal, Vladimir I. (1863–66). "Tolkovy slovar zhivogo velikorusskogo yazyka" Толковый словарь живого великорусского языка [Explanatory Dictionary of the Living Great Russian Language]. Akademik (in Russian). Sankt-Petersburg: Obshchestvo lyubiteley rossiyskoy slovesnosti.
- Davidson, Alan (2014) [1999]. "Kisel". In Davidson, Alan; Jaine, Tom (eds.). The Oxford Companion to Food (3rd ed.). Oxford University Press. doi:10.1093/acref/9780199677337.001.0001. ISBN 9780199677337.
- "Dictionary.com Unabridged". Random House.
- Doroszewski, Witold, ed. (1969). "Słownik Języka Polskiego" [Polish Dictionary] (in Polish). Warszawa: Państwowe Wydawnictwo Naukowe.
- "Encyclopædia Britannica Online". Encyclopædia Britannica Inc.
- Gal, A.M. (2003). "Dicționar gastronomic explicativ" [Explanatory Culinary Dictionary] (in Romanian). Editura Gemma Print.
- Gloger, Zygmunt (1900). Encyklopedja Staropolska [Old Polish Encyclopedia] (in Polish). Warszawa: P. Laskauer i W. Babicki.
- Hirsch, Emil G.; Benzinger, Immanuel; Jacobs, Joseph; Harris, Isidore; Fishberg, Bertha; Dobsevage, I. George (1906). "Cookery". Jewish Encyclopedia. New York: Funk & Wagnalls Co. pp. 254–257. LCCN 16014703.
- King, David C. (2006). Azerbaijan. Cultures of the World. New York: Marshall Cavendish. p. 123. ISBN 0-7614-2011-8.
- MacVeigh, Jeremy (2008). International Cuisine. Clifton Park, NY: Cengage Learning. ISBN 978-1-111-79970-0.
- Mallory, J.P.; Adams, D.Q. (2006). The Oxford Introduction to Proto-Indo-European and the Proto-Indo-European World. Oxford University Press. ISBN 978-0-19-929668-2.
- Marks, Gil (1999). The World of Jewish Cooking. Simon & Schuster. ISBN 978-0-684-83559-4.
- Marks, Gil (2010). Encyclopedia of Jewish Food. Hoboken: John Wiley & Sons. ISBN 978-0-470-39130-3.
- "Merriam-Webster's Word Central".
- Mish, Frederick C. (2004). Merriam-Webster's Collegiate Dictionary (11th ed.).
- "Prykazky ta pryslivia pro yizhu" Приказки та прислів`я про їжу [Sayings and proverbs about food]. Vislovi (in Ukrainian). Archived from the original on 2017-10-12.
- Reid, Robert; Pettersen, Leif (2007). Romania & Moldova. Lonely Planet. ISBN 978-1-74104-478-2.
- Rennon, Rosemary K. (2007). Language and Travel Guide to Romania. New York: Hippocrene Books. ISBN 978-0-7818-1150-7.
- Saberi, Philip; Saberi, Helen (2014) [1999]. "Borshch". In Davidson, Alan; Jaine, Tom (eds.). The Oxford Companion to Food (3rd ed.). Oxford University Press. doi:10.1093/acref/9780199677337.001.0001. ISBN 9780199677337.
- The Visual Food Encyclopedia. Québec Amerique. 1996. ISBN 978-2-7644-0898-8.
- Trubachyov, Oleg, ed. (1987). Etimologichesky slovar slavyanskikh yazykov Этимологический словарь славянских языков [Etymological Dictionary of Slavic Languages] (in Russian). Moskva: Nauka.
- Vasmer, Maksimilian Romanovich (1973) [1958]. "Etimologichesky slovar russkogo yazyka" Этимологический словарь русского языка [Russian Etymological Dictionary]. Akademik (in Russian). Moskva: Progress.
- World and Its Peoples: Belarus, Russian Federation, and Ukraine. New York: Marshall Cavendish. 2010. ISBN 978-0-7614-7900-0.
- World and Its Peoples: Middle East, Western Asia and Northern Africa. New York: Marshall Cavendish. 2006. ISBN 978-0-7614-7571-2.
- Zdanovich, Leonid I. (2014). Bibliya povara ili entsiklopediya sovremennoy kukhni Библия повара или энциклопедия современной кухни [Chef's Bible, or Encyclopedia of Modern Cuisine] (in Russian). Noginsk: Osteon-Press. ISBN 978-5-00-064178-1.
- Żmigrodzki, Piotr (ed.). "Wielki Słownik Języka Polskiego" [The Great Polish Dictionary] (in Polish). Instytut Języka Polskiego PAN.
