= Wincenta Zawadzka =

- Born: c. 1824
- Died: 27 August 1894
- Occupation: Cookbook author

Wincenta Zawadzka (Polish pronunciation: [vʲinˈt͡sɛnta zaˈvat͡ska]; also known as Wincentyna Zawadzka, née Żółkowska; ca. 1824 – 1894) was the author of a popular Polish-language cookbook, Kucharka litewska (The Lithuanian Cook). Her book was first published in Vilnius in 1843, under the pen name W.A.L.Z.
