= Mititei =

Romanian meat roll

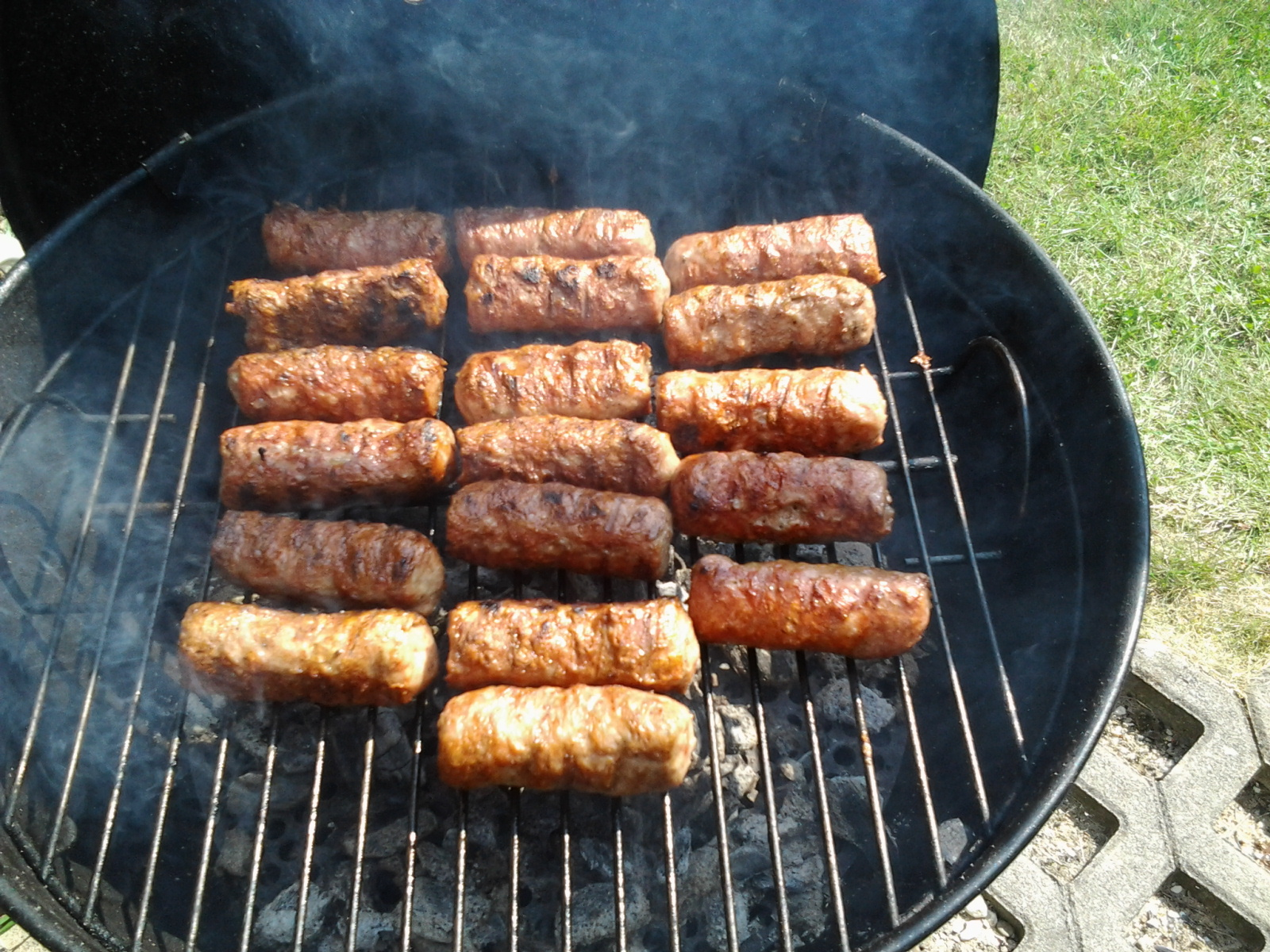
- Mititei on a grill
- Alternative names: Mititei or mici
- Course: Main course
- Region or state: Romania
- Serving temperature: Hot
- Main ingredients: Lamb, pork, beef, coriander, onion, garlic, black pepper, thyme, sodium bicarbonate

Mititei (Romanian pronunciation: [mitiˈtej]) or mici (Romanian pronunciation: [mit͡ʃʲ]; both Romanian words meaning "little ones", "small ones") is a traditional dish from Romanian cuisine, consisting of grilled ground meat sausages made from a mixture of beef, lamb and pork, with spices such as garlic, black pepper, thyme, coriander, anise, savory, and sometimes a touch of paprika. Sodium bicarbonate and broth or water are also added to the mixture. It is similar to ćevapi, kebapche and other ground meat-based dishes throughout the Balkans and the Middle East.

It is often served with mustard, french fries and murături (pickled vegetables).

== History ==
A popular story claims that 'mici' or 'mititei' were invented in the late 14th century and that they originated in southern Serbia, then part of Ottoman Empire. 'Mici' or 'mititei' are believed to share the same origin as ćevapi and other minced meat that where introduced in the Balkans during Ottoman rule.

Throughout the years, the recipe lost some of the original ingredients, such as caraway seeds and allspice, and began being made with pork, rather than beef and lamb. Sodium bicarbonate, a raising agent, is also commonly added to the modern Romanian recipe, which improves both the flavor and the texture.

== Cultural and economic significance ==
Mici are very popular all across Romania, with an estimated 440 million mici consumed each year in Romania. They are eaten in homes, restaurants and pubs, but are probably most associated with outdoor grilling. As many Romanians celebrate International Workers' Day (1 May) by going to barbecues and picnics, mici have become strongly associated with the holiday in recent years, with 30 million mititei being eaten in Romania on the first day of May in 2019. Mici are sometimes called the "national dish of Romania" in the media, despite lacking any such official designation.

In 2018, between 5% and 10% of all the mici produced in Romania were exported, mainly to countries with large Romanian diasporas, such as Italy, Spain and the United Kingdom.

== See also ==
- Ćevapi
- Dry meatballs
- Kebapcheta
- Kebab
- Pljeskavica
- Chiftele – another Romanian dish
- Pârjoale – another Romanian dish
