= Borș (bran) =

Fermented liquid used to make soup

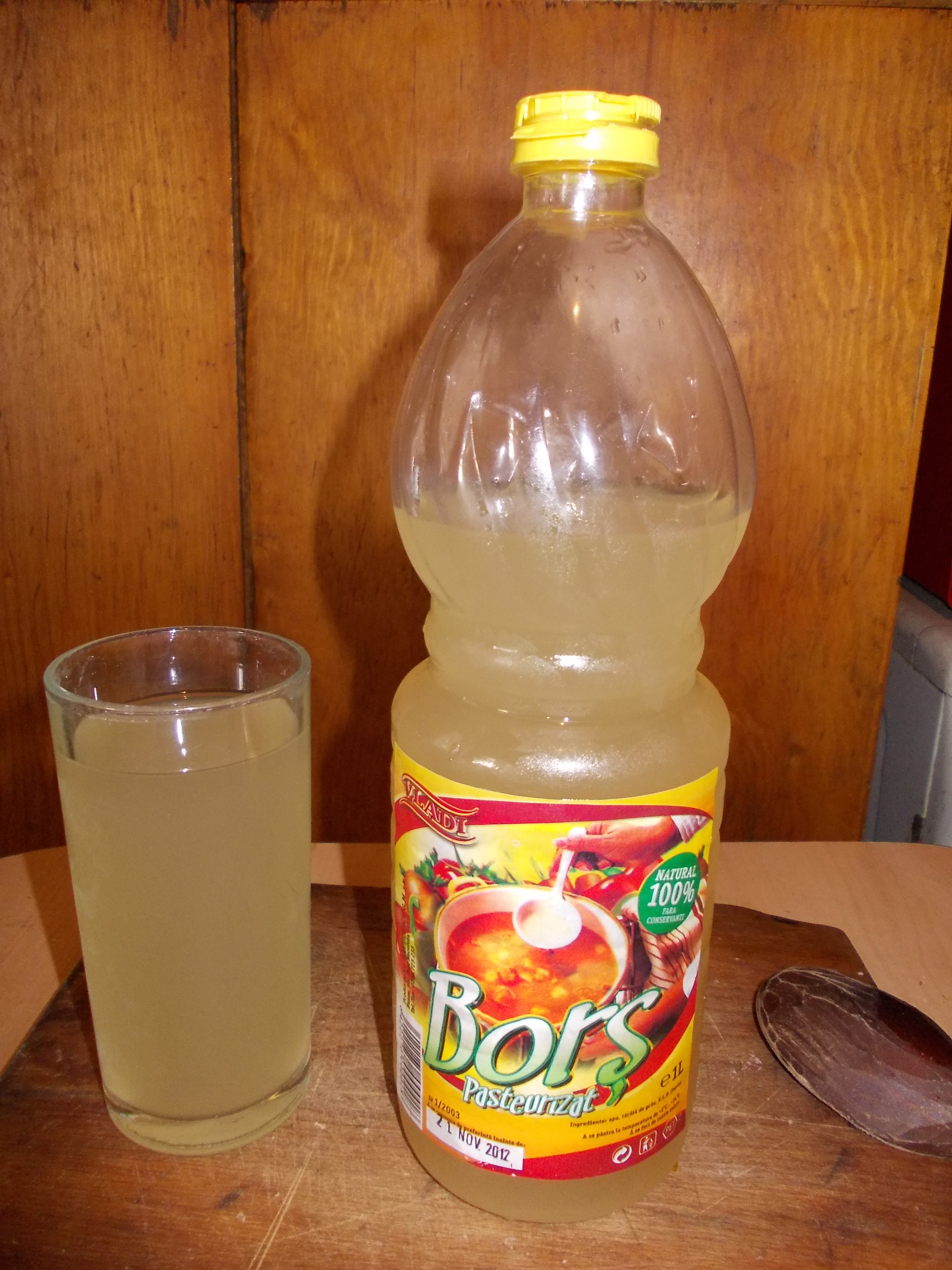
- Type: Cereal
- Main ingredients: Wheat bran

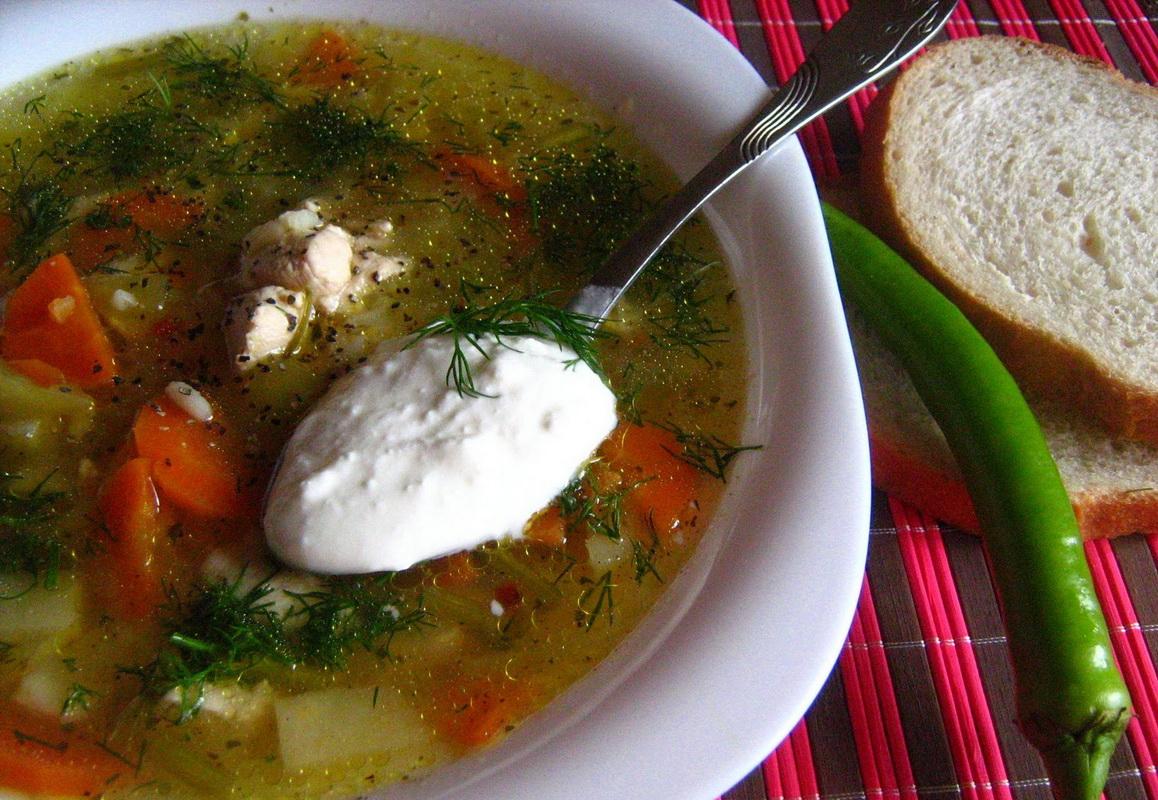
Borș – a Romanian and Moldovan national dish

Borș is either a liquid ingredient used in Romanian and Moldovan cuisine or the sour soup typically made with this ingredient. It used to be common in Hungary too, it is called Cibere.

The ingredient borș consists of water in which wheat or barley bran, sometimes sugar beet or a slice of bread has fermented. After decanting, the result is a slightly yellowish, sour liquid which can also be drunk as such. It contains lactic acid plus vitamins and minerals extracted from the bran. Whole lovage leaves can be added in the final liquid.

Romanian "borș" soup recipes can include various kinds of vegetables and any kind of meat, including fish. "Borș/ciorbă de perișoare" (a broth with meatballs) is quite common. One ingredient required in all recipes by Romanian tradition is lovage leaves, which have a characteristic flavour and significantly improves the soup's aroma.

== See also ==
- Borș de burechiușe
- Kvass
- Tarhana
- Rejuvelac
- Sour rye soup
