= Kuru köfte =

Turkish breaded meatball

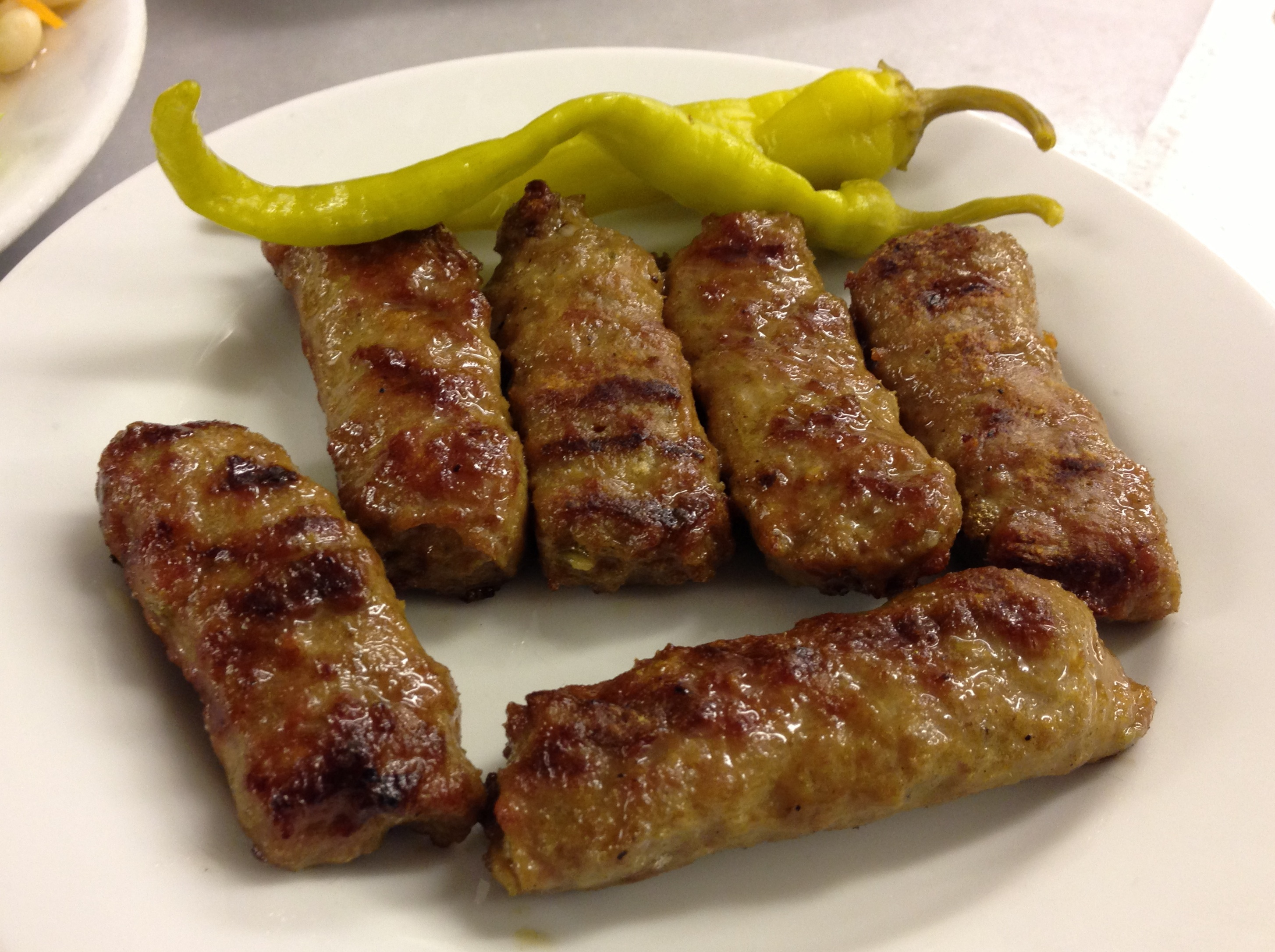
- Köfte from a restaurant in Istanbul
- Course: Main course
- Main ingredients: Meat (lamb or beef), garlic, onion

Kuru köfte (dry meatballs) is a Turkish breaded meatball, usually minced lamb or mixed with sheep, beef or chicken meat, mixed with eggs, with garlic, herbs (parsley, dill, thyme), spices and salt homogenized to form some balls, rolled on bread crumbs or flour and fried in hot oil.

== See also ==
- Köfte
- Frikadeller
- Chiftele
- List of meatball dishes
- Mititei
- Pârjoale
