= Sour cereal soup =

Traditional Slavic soup

Sour cereal soup is a Polish traditional soup made with various types of cereals such as rye, wheat and oats, which are fermented to create a sourdough-like soup base and stirred into a pot of stock which may contain meat such as boiled sausage and bacon, along with other ingredients such as hard-boiled eggs, potatoes and dried mushrooms.

The most notable, żur (also called żurek, zalewajka, keselica or barszcz biały), is considered a part of the national cuisine of Poland. Made with soured rye flour (sourdough starter), sometimes also with soured oatmeal, bread or wheat, it has a characteristic slightly sour, thick and tangy taste, and is served hot.

Sour cereal soup can also be found in Lithuanian, Ukrainian or Belarusian cuisine (as žur, kiselycia or kisialica), a remnant of all these countries' current territory being once in the Polish–Lithuanian Commonwealth. Though it is also prepared in the mountainous regions of Bohemia in the Czech Republic, where it is known as kyselo.

== Poland ==
Żur
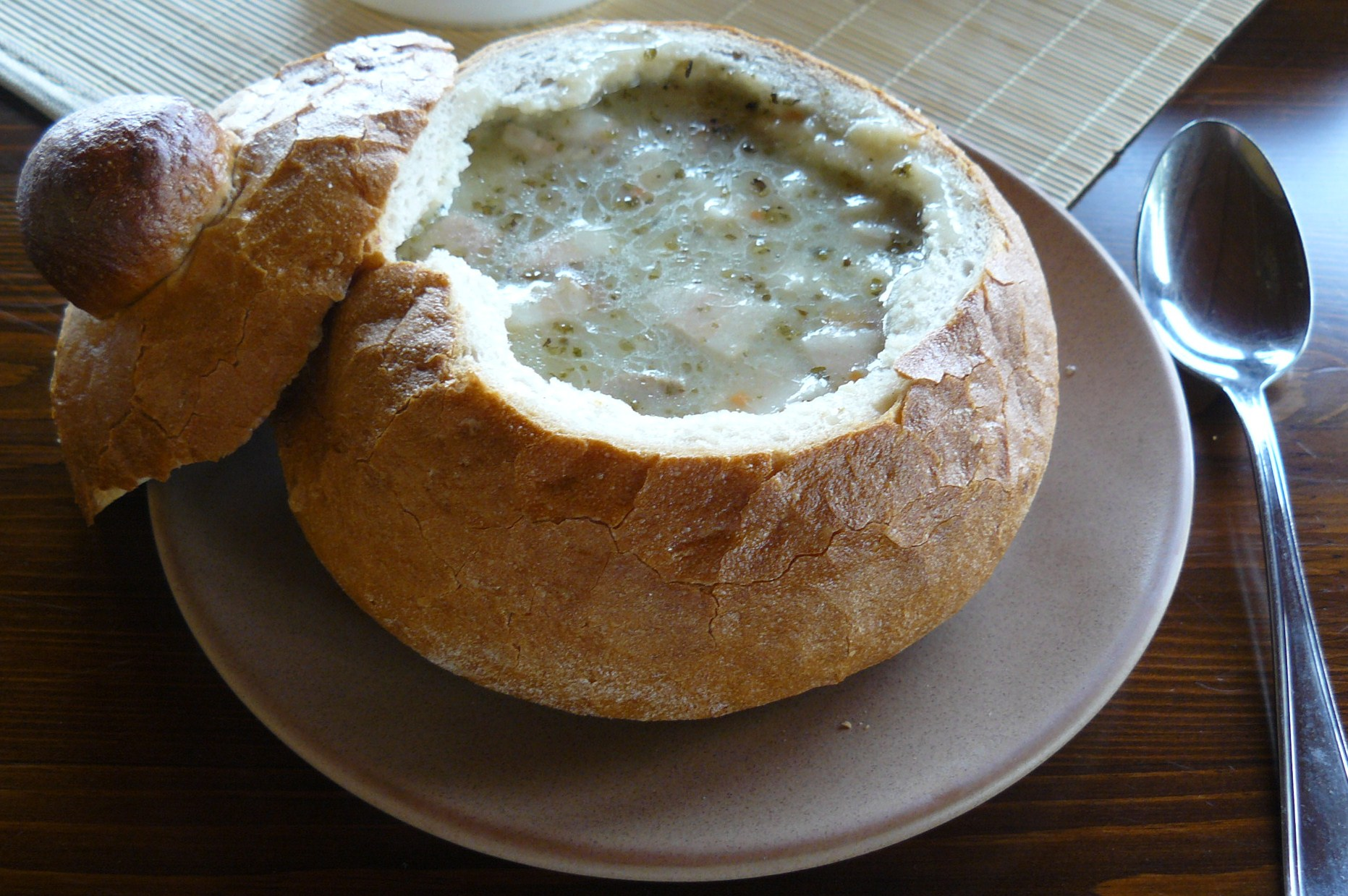
- Żur in a bread bowl
- Alternative names: Żurek
- Course: Soup, entree
- Place of origin: Poland
- Serving temperature: Hot
- Main ingredients: Soured rye flour or oats; potatoes, hard-boiled eggs; in some variations: meat (sausage, bacon, pork ribs, etc.)
- Variations: Kisełycia

Żur (Polish: żur, diminutive: żurek) is a soup made of soured rye flour (akin to sourdough) and meat (usually boiled pork sausage or pieces of smoked sausage, bacon or pork ribs).

The recipe varies regionally. In Poland it is sometimes served in an edible bowl made of bread or with boiled potatoes. In Silesia, a type of sour rye soup known as żur śląski is served in a bowl, poured over mashed potatoes. In the Podlasie region and also elsewhere in Poland, it is common to eat żurek with halved hard-boiled eggs. In Polish Subcarpathia, there is a traditional variety made of fermented oatmeal (Polish: żur owsiany or kisełycia). In Poland żurek is traditionally eaten at Easter, but is also popular during other parts of the year. It is sometimes flavored with bits of sausage, usually eaten with bread or rolls.

The following ingredients may be used:

- cured bones
- pork ribs
- white sausage
- pork belly
- onion
- potatoes
- carrots
- celery root
- parsley
- marjoram
- bay leaves
- allspice
- lovage
- caraway seed
- garlic
- dried mushrooms
- cream
- horseradish
- hard-boiled eggs

== Belarus ==
In Belarus, žur (Belarusian: жур) or kisjalica (Belarusian: кісяліца) is a soup made of fermented oatmeal or rye. Žur may also denote a thicker porridge, a type of kissel made of fermented oatmeal, which is known since the times of Kievan Rus'.

== Czech Republic ==
Kyselo
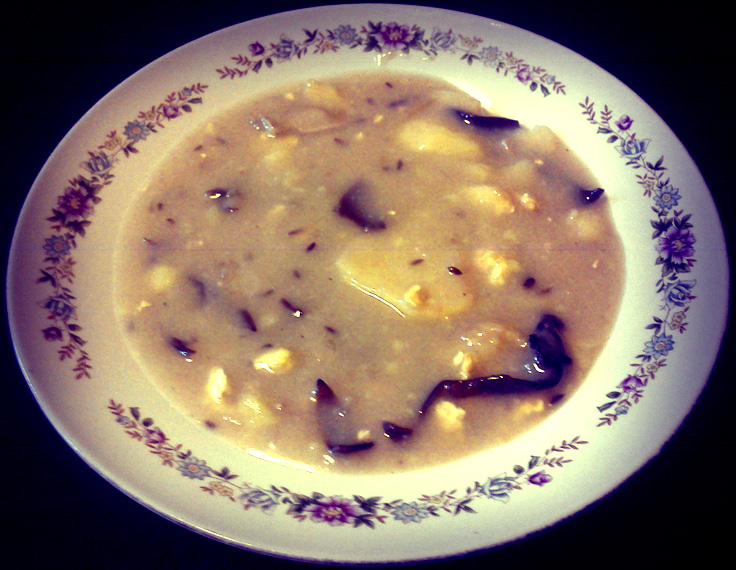
- Alternative names: Krkonošské kyselo, Kübelsauer
- Course: Soup, Entrée, Main course
- Place of origin: Czech Republic
- Region or state: Giant Mountains
- Serving temperature: Hot
- Main ingredients: Sourdough, mushrooms, caraway
- Food energy (per serving): 250 (depends on ingredients)

Kyselo (Czech: kyselo, krkonošské kyselo; German: Kübelsauer) is a soup based on rye sourdough and mushrooms. It is a traditional Czech dish originating from poor folk food in the Northern Bohemia highland region of the Giant Mountains. It is very substantial and it contains an abundance of proteins, B vitamins, dietary fiber and other important nutrients.

=== Origin ===
Kyselo has been a traditional daily food of poor people in the Giant Mountain region for centuries, primarily in the winter. It is made from locally accessible, cheap, storable ingredients (the mushrooms are usually used dried) and nutritious ingredients so it provides substantial energy for hard mountain life and work. Historically kyselo was made without eggs. Eggs in early times were produced mainly for sale on the market, not for one's own family, so eggs were only eaten on some holidays. Potatoes became widespread among poor people of Czech lands in the late 18th century, so before that time soups of this type were also made without potatoes.

Usage of sourdough indicates that kyselo has ancient origins, probably in prehistoric and medieval fermented cereal porridges. The Giant Mountain region is on the Czech–Polish border, and kyselo is a close relative of the Polish sour rye soup.

=== Etymology ===
The word kyselo is derived from the Slavic word (Polish, Slovak, Czech) "kisić" "to make sour", kyselý, which means 'sour' in Czech. The sourdough which kyselo is made from is called "chlebový kvásek" or "chlebový kvas" (not to be confused with the Russian kvass).

Sometimes another sour mushroom-based Czech soup kulajda or its variants are mistakenly called kyselo. The difference is that kulajda and similar soups do not use sourdough but sour cream or milk and vinegar. To reduce this misunderstanding, kyselo is often called Krkonošské kyselo ("Giant Mountain Kyselo").

In Eastern regions of the Czech Republic and in Slovakia there is a soup called kyselica, but it is a variation of sauerkraut soup.

=== Ingredients and preparation ===
The basis of kyselo is strong broth made from mushrooms and caraway in water. Central European mushroom species such as cep and similar ones are used. The mushrooms are usually used dried in the winter. The broth is thickened by sourdough which should ideally be made from rye flour. Families in the Giant Mountains would brew their sourdough base in cookware called "kyselák" or "kvasák". The thickened broth is supplemented by onion sautéed in butter, boiled and then roasted potatoes and scrambled eggs and seasoned with salt and vinegar. Due to its ancient origins, kyselo has no fixed recipe, and the preparation is a little different in every family. The recipe is passed on by oral tradition. There are local variants of kyselo in the Giant Mountains: without eggs or with hard-boiled eggs, boiled but not roasted potatoes, with or without cream, etc.

Instant powder kyselo base is now available for use in large catering kitchens or liquid fermented cereal.

=== Serving ===
Kyselo is sometimes served in an edible bread bowl. Garnishes of scallion, parsley or other green herbs can be used. The potatoes are often served on a plate for diners to help themselves. Usually salt and vinegar are also on the table for personal seasoning preferences. Kyselo is filling so is often served as a main course.

=== Folklore and popular culture ===
As a staple food, kyselo plays an important part in local legends and fairy tales, especially in connection to the mythical mountain lord Krakonoš (German: Rübezahl). It is said that he gave sourdough to people and invented kyselo. In the Giant Mountains there is also a peak called the Kotel (Polish: Kocioł, German: Kesselkoppe) which means cauldron. When fog rises from the valley at bottom of Kotel, people say that Krakonoš is cooking the kyselo.

== Similar dishes ==
Eastern European cuisines also have variations of soups based on soured flour or other modes of fermentation. Examples are Russian okroshka made with kvass, Romanian borș made of fermented wheat or barley bran along with ciorbă, and Finnish hapanvelli soup is made with pea and sour dough. A more distant relative is Japanese miso soup, which also uses a fermented basic ingredient – miso paste.

== See also ==
- List of sour soups
