= Moldovan cuisine =

Culinary traditions of Moldova

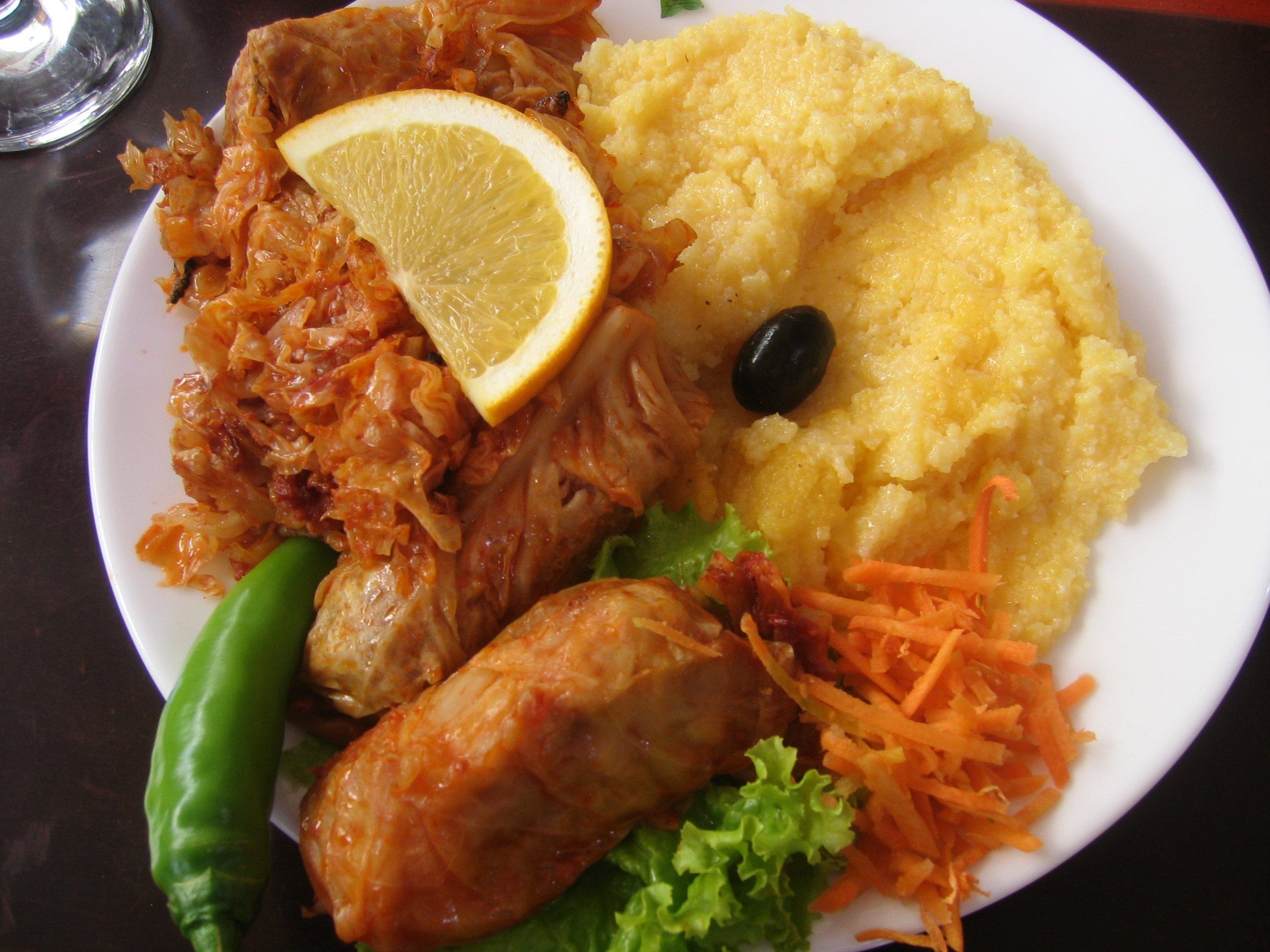
A popular Moldovan dish of sarmale (stuffed cabbage rolls), accompanied by sauerkraut and mămăligă

Moldovan cuisine is a style of cooking related to the people of Moldova. It consists mainly of ingredients such as various meats, potatoes, cabbage, and a variety of cereal grains. The local cuisine is very similar to Romanian, and also draws inspiration and elements from other cuisines in the region, including Greek, Ukrainian, and Russian, with an influence left by Ottoman cuisine.

With the cuisine of Moldova being shared by another country, namely Romanian cuisine, there are similarities to these two cuisines of the two Romanian-speaking countries.

== Background ==
Moldova's soil (chernozem) produces grapes, fruits, vegetables, grains, meat, and milk products, all of which have found their uses in the national cuisine. The black soil combined with the use of traditional agricultural methods permits the growth of a wide range of foods in Moldova.

== Dishes ==
Perhaps the most-known Moldovan dish is also a well-known Romanian dish, mămăligă (a cornmeal mush or porridge). This is a staple polenta-like food on the Moldovan table, served as an accompaniment to stews and meat dishes or garnished with cottage cheese, sour cream, or pork rind. Regional foods include brânză (a brined cheese) and friptură (a lamb or goat stew). Local wines accompany most meals.

Traditional Moldovan dishes combine diverse vegetables, such as tomatoes, bell peppers, aubergine, cabbage, beans, onions, garlic, and leeks. Vegetables are used in salads and sauces, and also baked, steamed, pickled (called murături), salted, or marinated.

The various kinds of borș (ciorbă) include a wide range of soups with a sour taste. These may be meat and vegetable soups, or fish soups, all of which are soured by borș (traditionally made from bran), or lemon juice. Chicken soup with meat, known as zeamă, is served.

Meat is traditionally served as an appetizer or first course. Roasted and grilled pork, beef meatballs (known as pârjoale and chiftele), and steamed lamb are common. Meat and fish are often marinated and then grilled.

Traditional holiday dishes include stuffed cabbage rolls with minced meat (known in Moldova/Romania as "sarmale", and in Turkey as "dolma"), pilaf (a rice dish), pork jelly, noodles, and chicken, among others. The holiday table is usually decorated with baked items, such as pastries, cakes, rolls, and buns, with a variety of fillings (such as cheese, fruit, vegetables, and walnuts), known (also in Romania) as cozonac, pască, brânzoaice (poale-n brâu), sfințișori, papanași, colaci, plăcinte, and cornulețe.

In certain areas, the cuisine of various ethnic minorities is predominant. In eastern Moldova, Ukrainians eat borscht; in the south, the Bessarabian Bulgarians eat mangea (chicken with sauce), while the Gagauz eat shorpa, a highly seasoned mutton soup; in the Russian communities, pelmeni (meat-filled dumplings) are popular. Various dishes served at the New Year's Eve table include mostly Russian-influenced dishes such as șuba and salată de boeuf.

Other commonly served dishes include a variant of pierogi called colțunași, filled with fresh white cheese (colțunași cu brînză), meat (colțunași cu carne), or cherries.

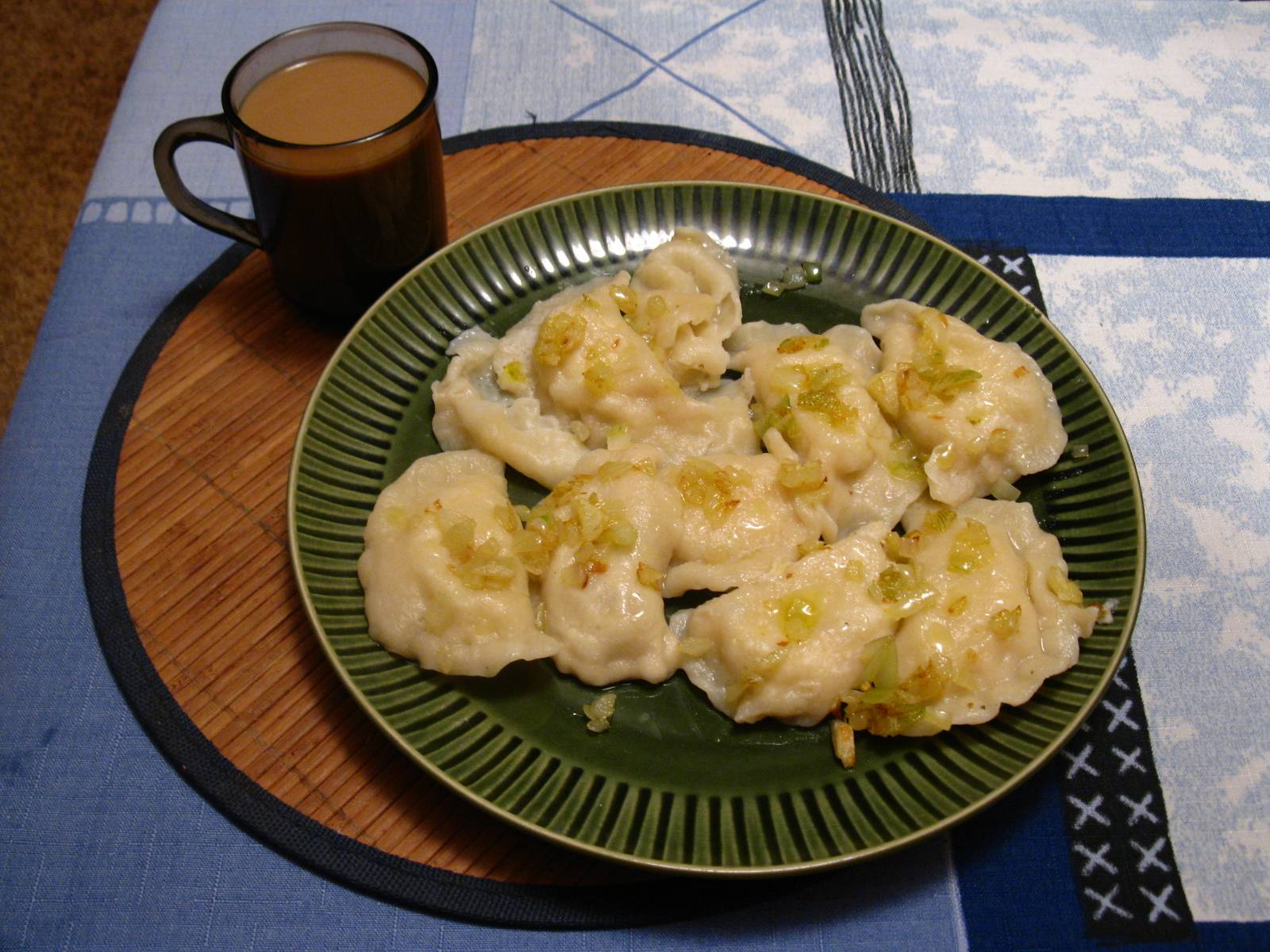
Borș de burechiușe

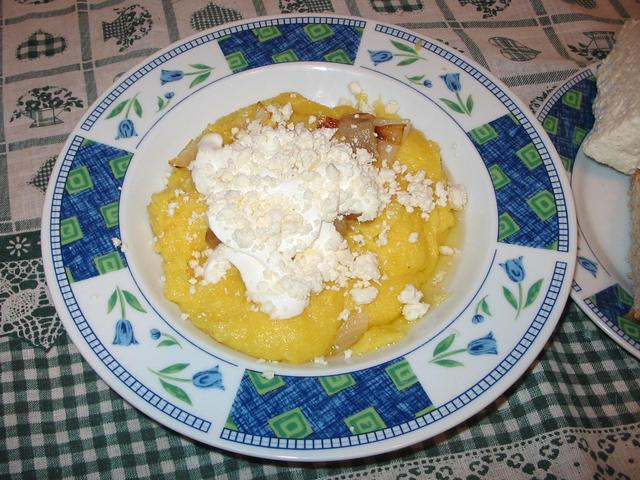
Mămăligă with cheese and greaves

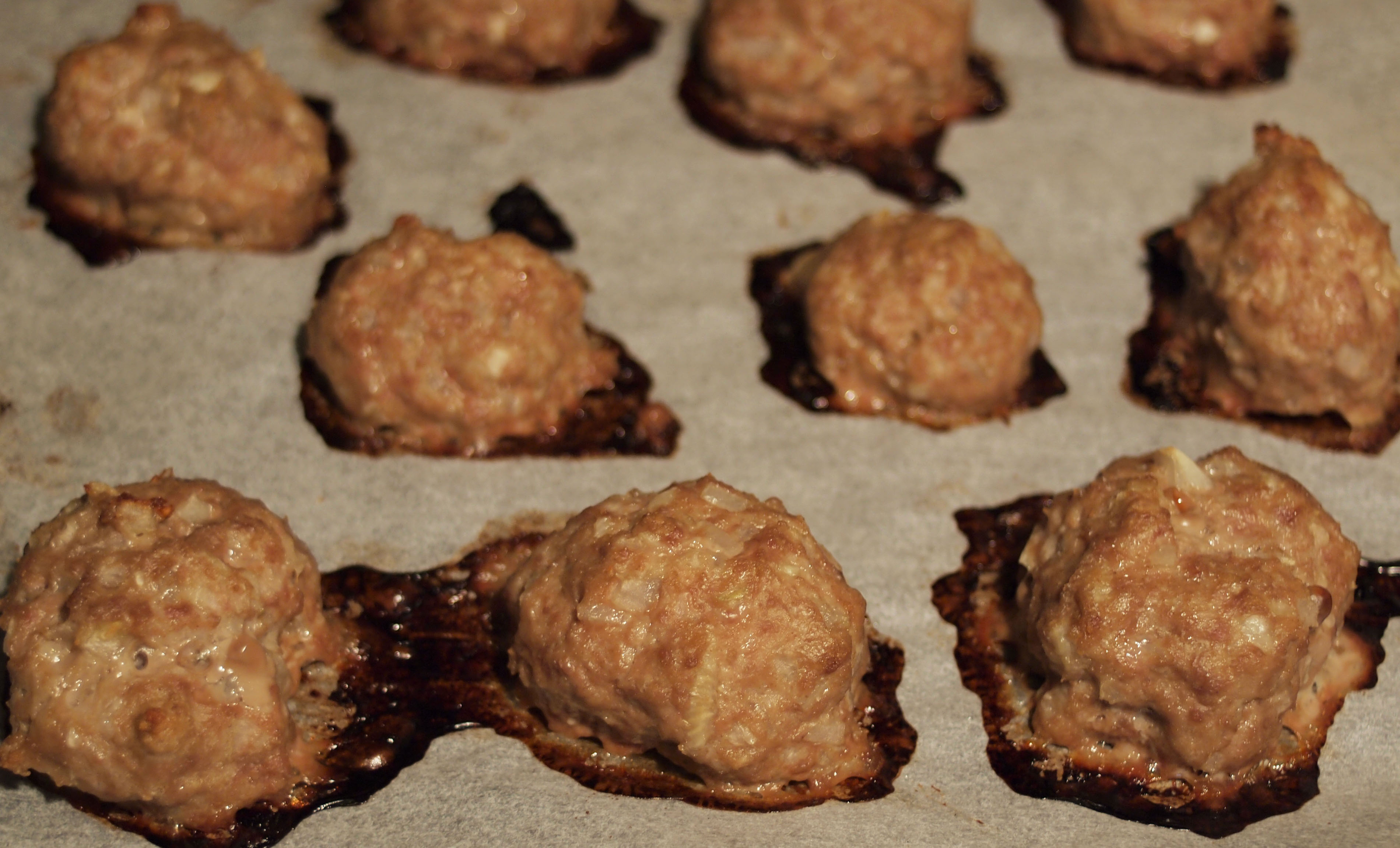
Meatballs (chiftele)

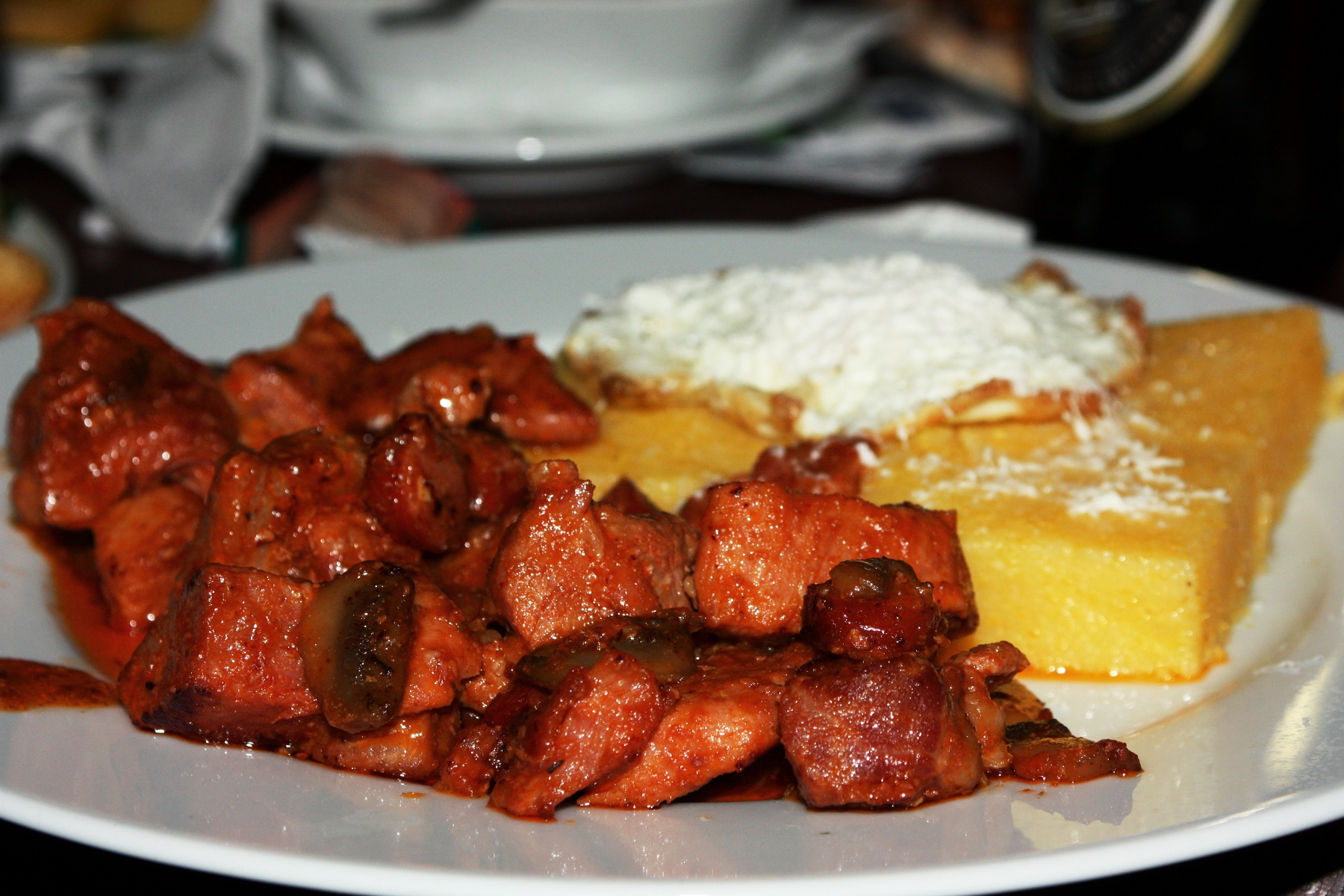
Tochitură

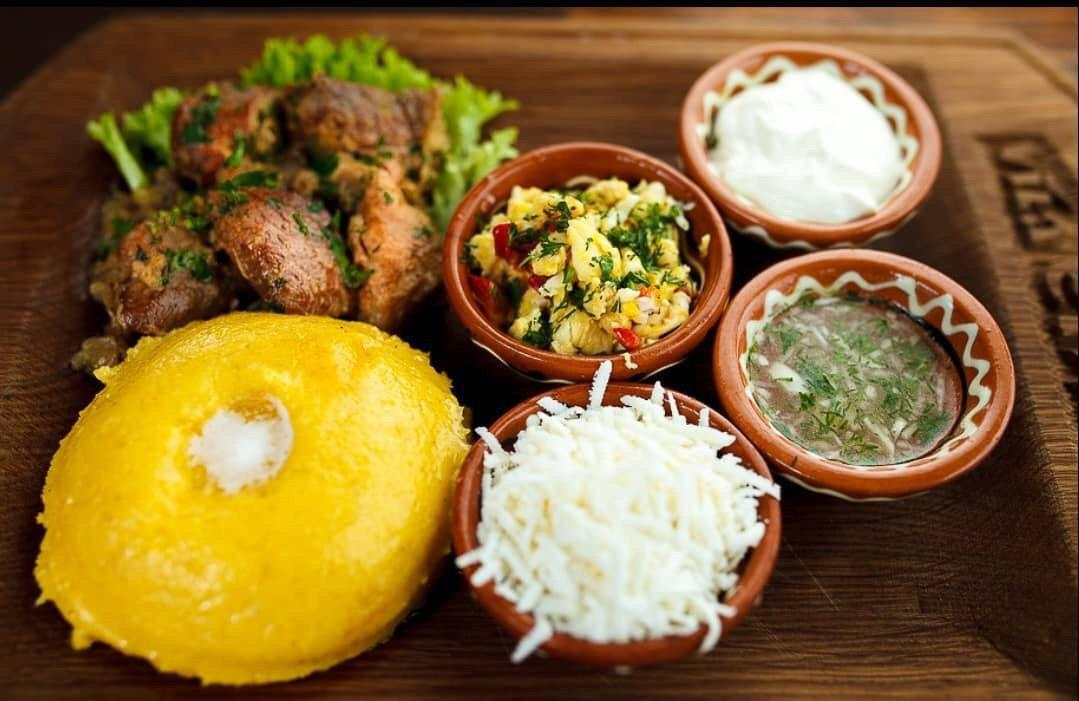
Mămăligă

== Beverages ==
Non-alcoholic beverages include fruit juice, traditional compot (made from boiled fruit), and kvas (a fermented beverage made from toasted rye bread). Popular alcoholic beverages are divin (Moldovan brandy), beer, and local wine.

European grapes are used in the wine making. Popular grapes include Sauvignon, Cabernet, and Muscat. The main domestic Moldovan varieties include Fetească, Rara neagră, and Busuioacă albă.

Sparkling wine has a place in Moldovan cuisine. The country produces large quantities of white and pink sparkling wines, as well as red sparkling wines that were originally introduced in Moldova. The most famous sparkling wines are those made in the Cricova winery. Well-known brands of Moldovan sparkling wines are Negru de Purcari, Moldova, Chişinău, Cricova, Muscat spumant, National, Nisporeni, etc. They are made from a wide range of European grape varieties, including Chardonnay, Pinot blanc, Pinot gris, Pinot menie, Sauvignon, Aligote, Traminer pink, Muscat blanc, Cabernet Sauvignon, and Pinot noir. The local variety Feteasca Albă, also used in sparkling wines, has been cultivated in Moldova since the times of ancient Dacia.

== Cookbook ==
The first cookbook in the Romanian language, 200 Proven Recipes for Dishes, Pastries, and Other Household Works, was written in 1841 in Iași, in the Principality of Moldova, by Costache Negruzzi and Mihail Kogălniceanu.

== Postage stamps ==
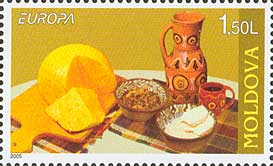
Corn mush, ewe’s cheese, and scraps

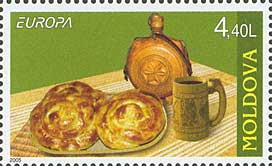
Invârtită filled with cheese

== See also ==
- Romanian cuisine
- Gagauz cuisine
