= Grenki =

Bread roasted in oil or in fat

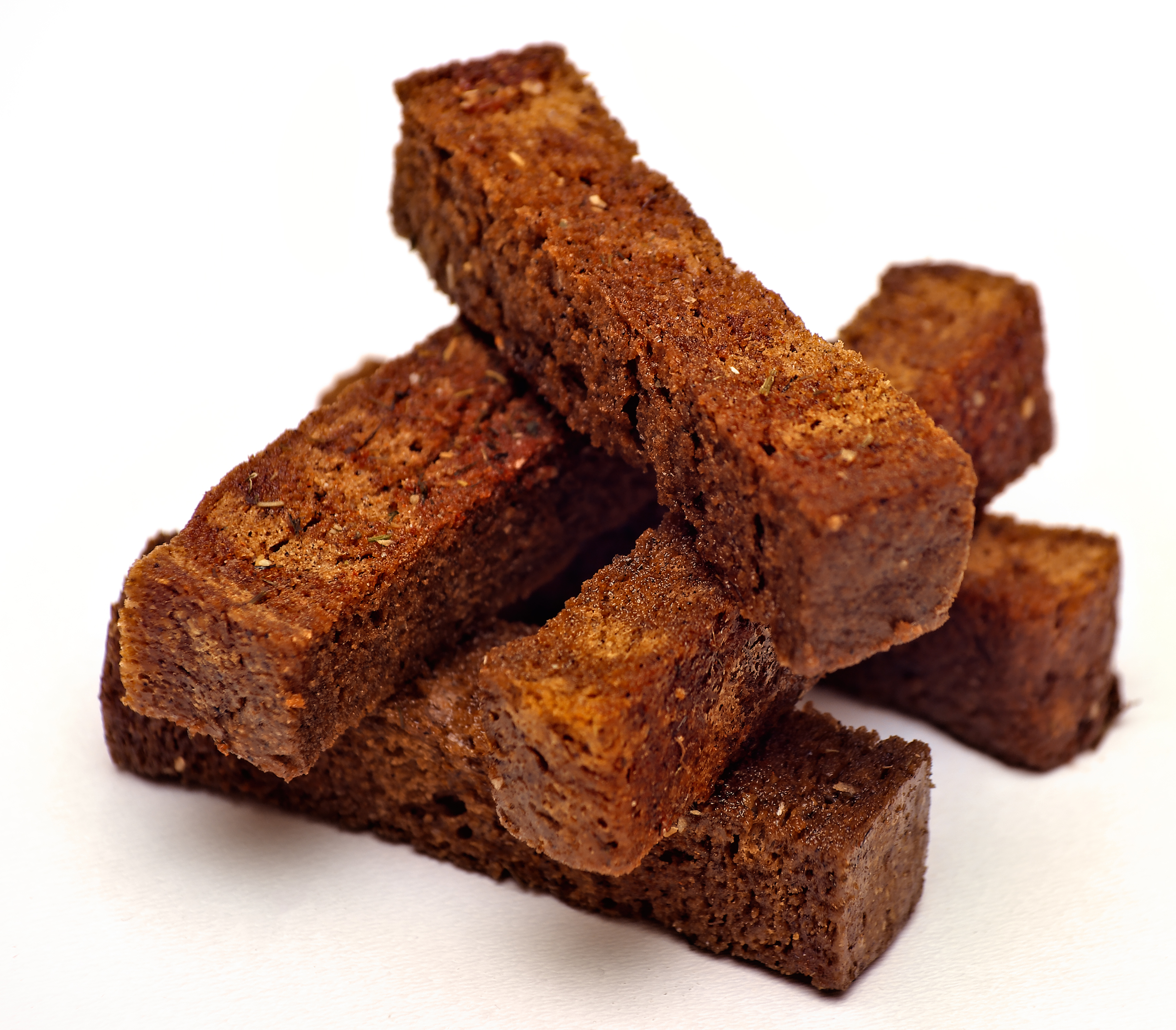
- Savoury grenki
- Course: Appetizer
- Region or state: Eastern Europe
- Associated cuisine: Eastern European cuisine
- Main ingredients: Bread
- Ingredients generally used: Cooking fat
- Variations: Sweet, Savoury
- Similar dishes: Croutons, French toast

Grenki (Russian: Гренки) are a collective term, describing different kinds of bread roasted in oil or in fat. Grenki can be made from fresh, as well as from stale bread.

== Origin ==
Dishes based on fried bread have been documented since Roman times. Dishes like grenki are commonly found throughout Slavic and Baltic countries. In Ukraine they are known as hrinky. The same dish is known as ķiploku grauzdiņ in Latvia or kepta duona in Lithuania. In Czech Republic, a similar dish called topinky consists of fried bread, usually rubbed with garlic and sprinkled with salt.

== Variations ==
Grenki can be roughly divided into two major categories:

- Savoury grenki can be made from any type of bread. They are commonly consumed as a snack, but they can also be added to soups or to salads, comparable to croutons. Savoury grenki are commonly fried og baked in garlic-infused fat, such as vegetable oil, butter, lard or beef drippings, and can be garnished with cheese or with herbs. Instead of infusing the fat with garlic, it is also common to rub the bread with garlic instead.
- Sweet grenki are the equivalent of French toast. They are made from white bread, coated in egg or soaked in milk and sprinkled with sugar.
