= Eastern European cuisine =

Culinary traditions of Eastern Europe

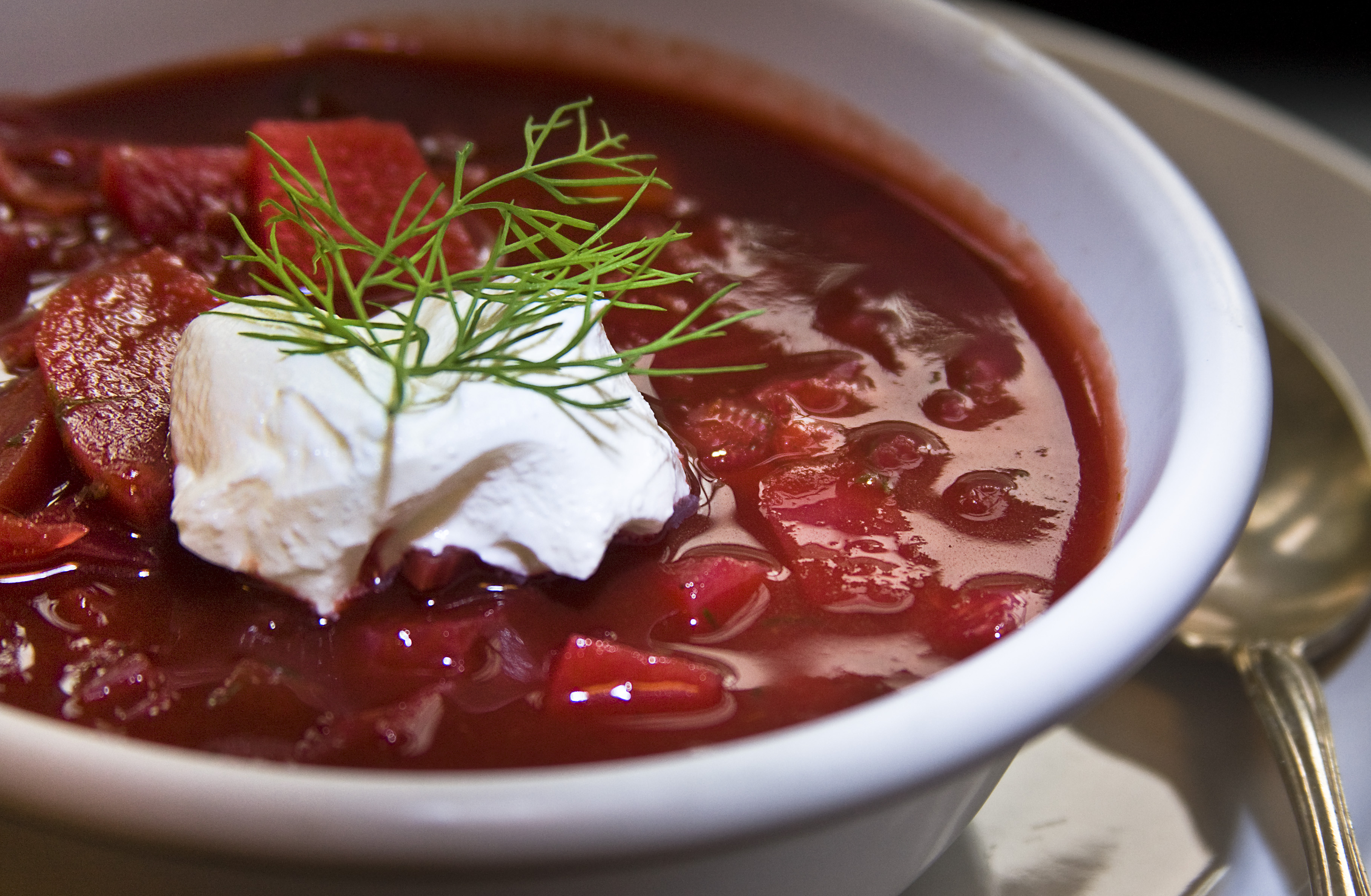
Borscht, a beet soup found in many countries of Central and Eastern Europe

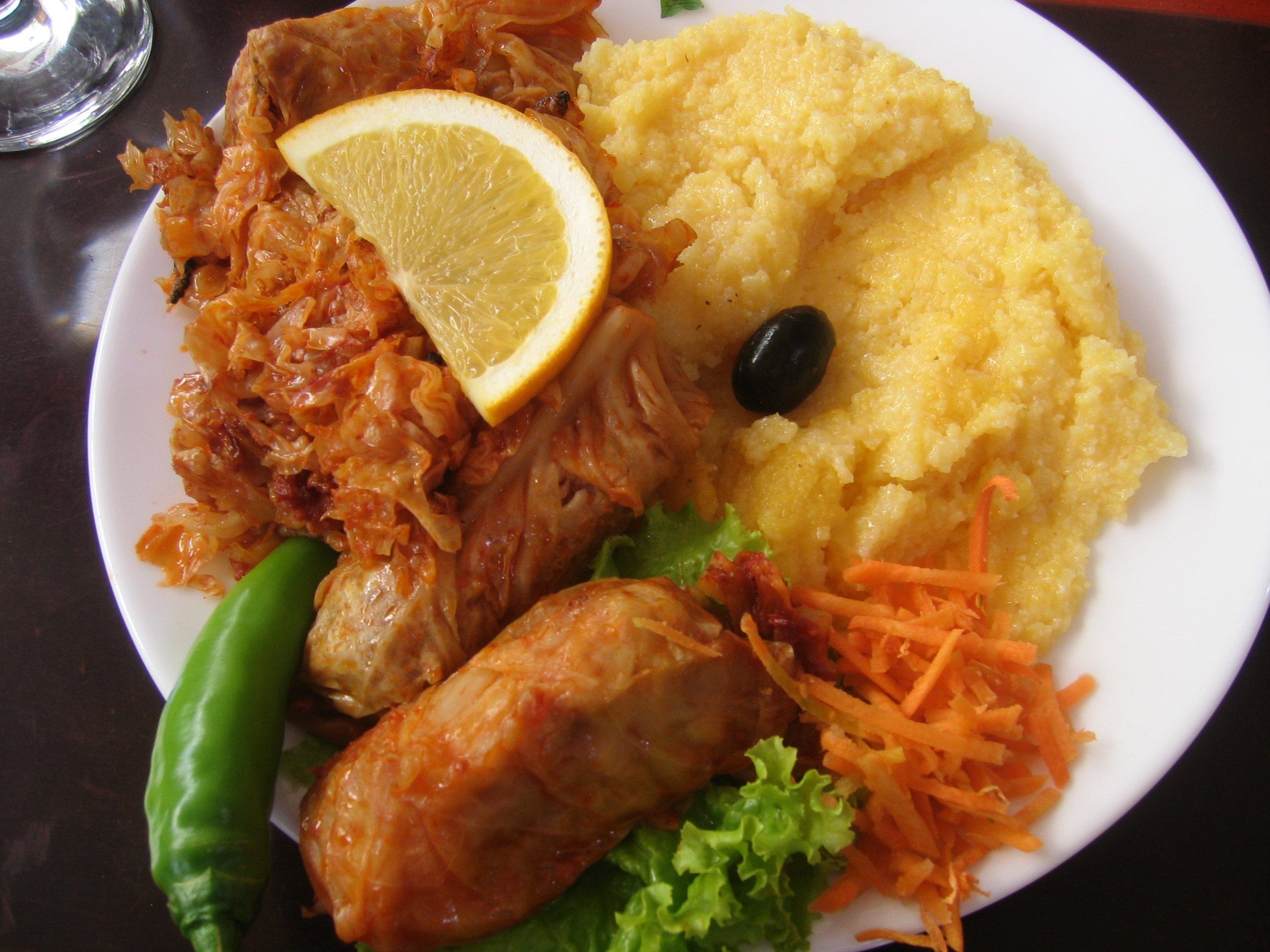
Sarma (cabbage roll) and mămăligă, popular in Romania, Moldova and other Eastern European countries

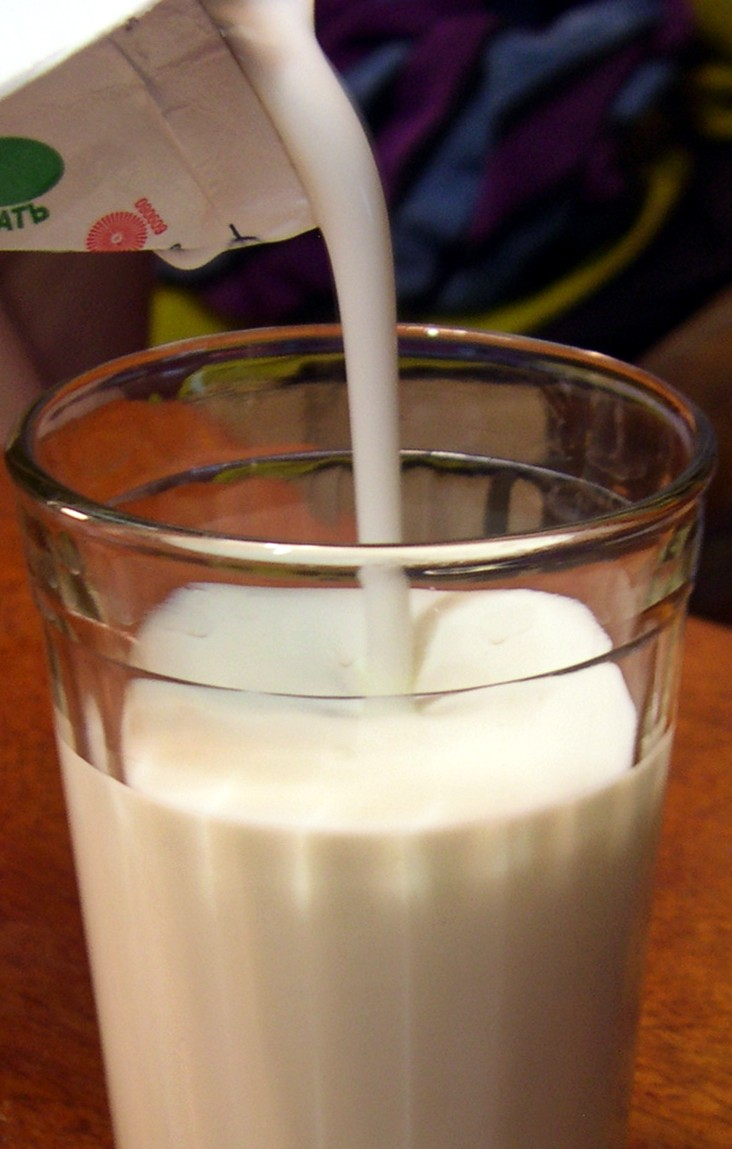
Kefir, a fermented milk drink originating in the North Caucasus region.

Eastern European cuisine encompasses many different cultures, ethnicities, languages, and histories of Eastern Europe.

The cuisine of the region is strongly influenced by its climate and still varies, depending on a country. For example, East Slavic countries of the Sarmatic Plain (Belarusian, Russian and Ukrainian cuisine) show many similarities.

== Characteristics ==
According to the Ethnic Food Lover's Companion, all significant Eastern European cuisines are closely connected with the political, social and economic revival of the region, following the long periods of historical turmoil. "These are substantial cuisines, meaty, rooty, smoky – part comfort food, part extravagance."

Their main ingredients include eggs, used most frequently in doughs and pastries; dairy products (with yogurt and cheese among the staples); grains, including rye, barley, wheat, buckwheat and millet used in kashas and in the making of breads; vegetables, in cold storage and in pickling; fish (salmon, pike, carp and herring), birds and poultry (chicken, duck, goose, partridge, quail, turkey); red meats such as veal, beef, pork and mutton; and plentiful fruits including pears, plums, cherries, raspberries, pomegranates, dates, and figs, used for desserts and a variety of liqueurs. The nutritional index of traditional dishes is generally high cholesterol, high sodium, and high fat.

== See also ==
- Armenian cuisine
- Ashkenazi Jewish cuisine
- Azerbaijani cuisine
- Balkan cuisine
- Belarusian cuisine
- Bulgarian cuisine
- Chechen cuisine
- Circassian cuisine
- Cossack cuisine
- Georgian cuisine
  - Abkhazian cuisine
- Kazakh cuisine
- Moldovan cuisine
  - Gagauz cuisine
- Ossetian cuisine
- Romanian cuisine
  - Transylvanian Saxon cuisine
- Russian cuisine
  - Bashkir cuisine
  - Komi cuisine
  - Mordovian cuisine
  - Tatar cuisine
  - Udmurt cuisine
- Soviet cuisine
- Ukrainian cuisine
  - Crimean Tatar cuisine
  - Odesite cuisine

== Books on Eastern European cuisine ==
- Russian, Polish & German Cooking: the very best of Eastern European cuisine; contributing editor: Lesley Chamberlain. Hermes House, 2006 ISBN 9780681280083
- Елена Молоховец, Подарок молодым хозяйкам, 1861–1917; in Russian. English edition: Elena Molokhovets, Classic Russian Cooking: A Gift to Young Housewives. Indiana University Press, 1998. ISBN 978-0253212108
- Institute of Nutrition of the Academy of Medical Scientists of the USSR, Книга о вкусной и здоровой пище. Москва: Пищевая промышленность, 1939–1999; in Russian. English edition: The Book of Tasty and Healthy Food: Iconic Cookbook of the Soviet Union. SkyPeak Publishing LLC, 2012, ISBN 978-0615691350
- Кулинария. Госторгиздат, 1955-1958 (Cookery, Moscow: Soviet state publishing house for business literature, 1955–1558; Russian)
- В. В. Похлебкин, Национальные кухни наших народов. Москва: Пищевая промышленность, 1980, ISBN 978-5952427839; in Russian. English edition: V. V. Pokhlebkin. Russian Delight: A Cookbook of the Soviet People, London: Pan Books, 1978
- В. В. Похлёбкин, Кулинарный словарь от А до Я. Москва: Центрполиграф, 2000, ISBN 5-227-00460-9 (William Pokhlyobkin, Culinary Dictionary. Moscow: Centrpoligraf, 2000; Russian)
- J. Gronow, S. Zhuravlev, The Establishment of Soviet Haute Cuisine. In Educated Tastes: Food, Drink, and Connoisseur Culture. Ed: Jeremy Strong. University of Nebraska Press, 2011, ISBN 978-0803219359
- Darra Goldstein, A Taste of Russia: A Cookbook of Russia Hospitality, Russian Life Books, 2nd edition: 1999, ISBN 978-1940585031
- Darra Goldstein, The Georgian Feast: The Vibrant Culture and Savory Food of Georgia. University of California Press, 2013, ISBN 978-0520275911
- Anya Von Bremzen, John Welchman. Please to the Table: The Russian Cookbook. Workman Pub., 1990. ISBN 9780894807534
- Metzger, Christine (ed.), Culinaria Germany. Cambridge: Ullmann, 2008.
- Fragner, Bert (2000). "From the Caucasus to the Roof of the World: a culinary adventure". In Sami Zubaida; Richard Tapper (eds.). A Taste of Thyme: Culinary Cultures of the Middle East (2nd ed.). London & New York: Tauris Parke Paperbacks. ISBN 1-86064-603-4.
- Robert Strybel, Maria Strybel, Polish Heritage Cookery. Hippocrene Books, 2005. ISBN 9780781811248
- Massimo Montanari, Il mondo in cucina (The world in the kitchen). Laterza, 2002
- Sidney Mintz. Tasting Food, Tasting Freedom: Excursions into Eating, Power, and the Past. Beacon Press, 1997, ISBN 0807046299
- Mintalová – Zubercová, Zora: Všetko okolo stola I.(All around the table I.), Vydavateľstvo Matice slovenskej, 2009, ISBN 978-80-89208-94-4
- Л. Я. Старовойт, М. С. Косовенко, Ж. М. Смирнова, Кулінарія. Київ: Вища школа, 1992, ISBN 5-11-002319-0 (L. Ya. Starovoit, M. S. Kosovenko, Zh. M. Smirnova, Cookery, Kyiv: Vyscha Shkola, 1992; Ukrainian)
- Українські страви. Київ: Державне видавництво технiчної лiтератури УРСР, 1960 (Ukrainian Dishes. Kyiv: State publishing house of the Ukrainian SSR, 1960; Ukrainian)
- Л. М. Безусенко (ред.): Українська нацiональна кухня. Київ: Сталкер, 2002, ISBN 966-596-462-3 (L. M. Besussenko (Ed.): Ukrainian National Cuisine. Kyiv: Stalker, 2002; Ukrainian)
