= Salată de boeuf =

Cold beef salad

Salată boeuf
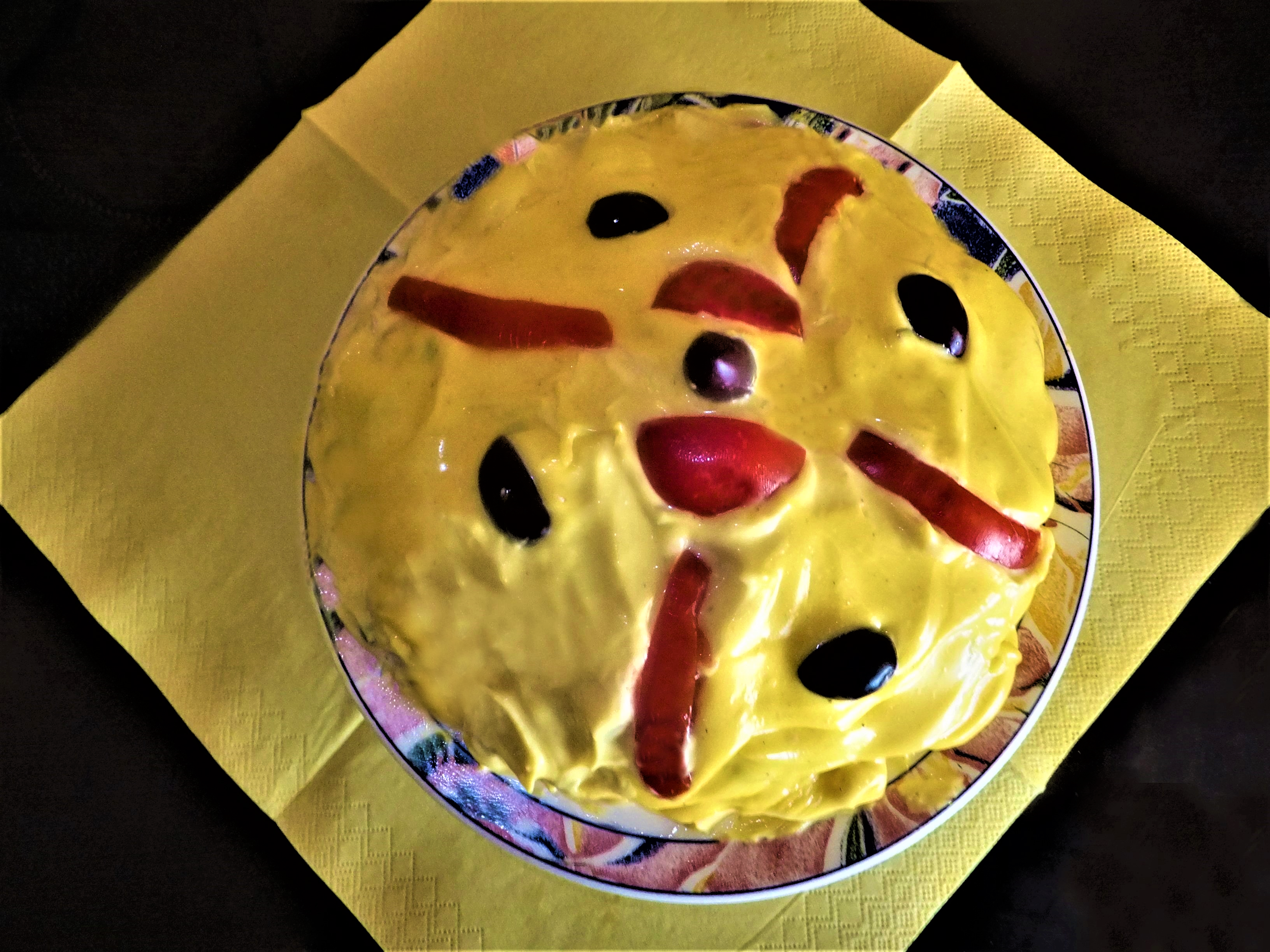
- Salată de boeuf
- Course: Appetizer
- Region or state: Romania
- Serving temperature: Cold
- Main ingredients: Chicken; Beef; Mayonnaise; Pickled gherkins Carrot; Potato; Parsley root

Salată de boeuf ("beef salad") is a traditional Romanian dish, generally served during all festive and special occasions. It is a combination of finely chopped beef (or sometimes chicken, or turkey breast) and root vegetables, folded in mayonnaise and finished with murături (pickled vegetable garnishes). It can be made as a vegetarian dish as well.

The dish is usually made in large quantities for the whole party on occasions such as Christmas Eve. It is eaten as a side dish or salad with fried meats or as an appetizer.

The name may suggest a French culinary influence as the word bœuf is French for beef. It closely resembles Olivier salad (Russian salad).

== See also ==
- List of salads
