= Kebapche =

Dish of grilled minced meat with spices

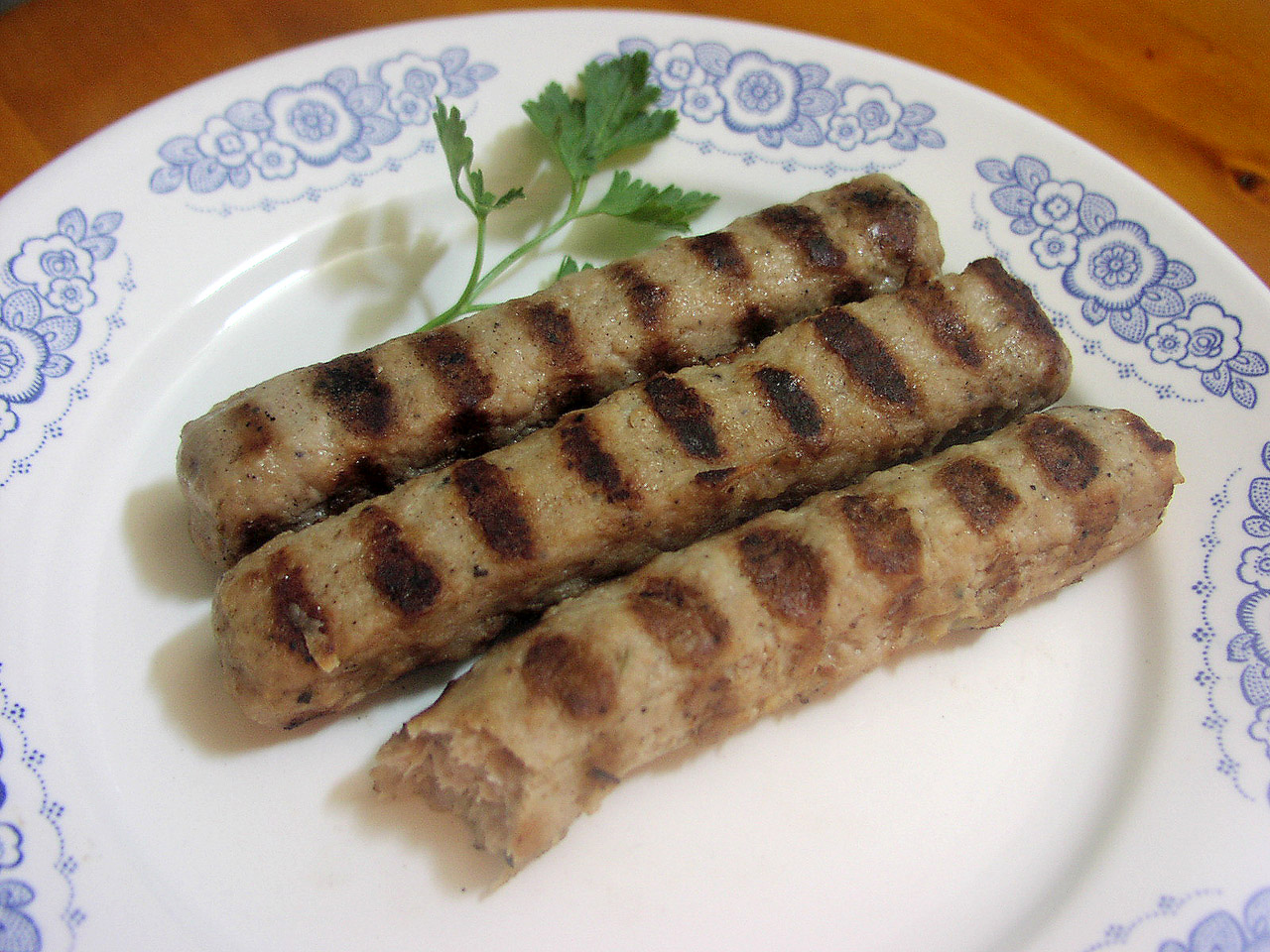
Bulgarian kebapcheta

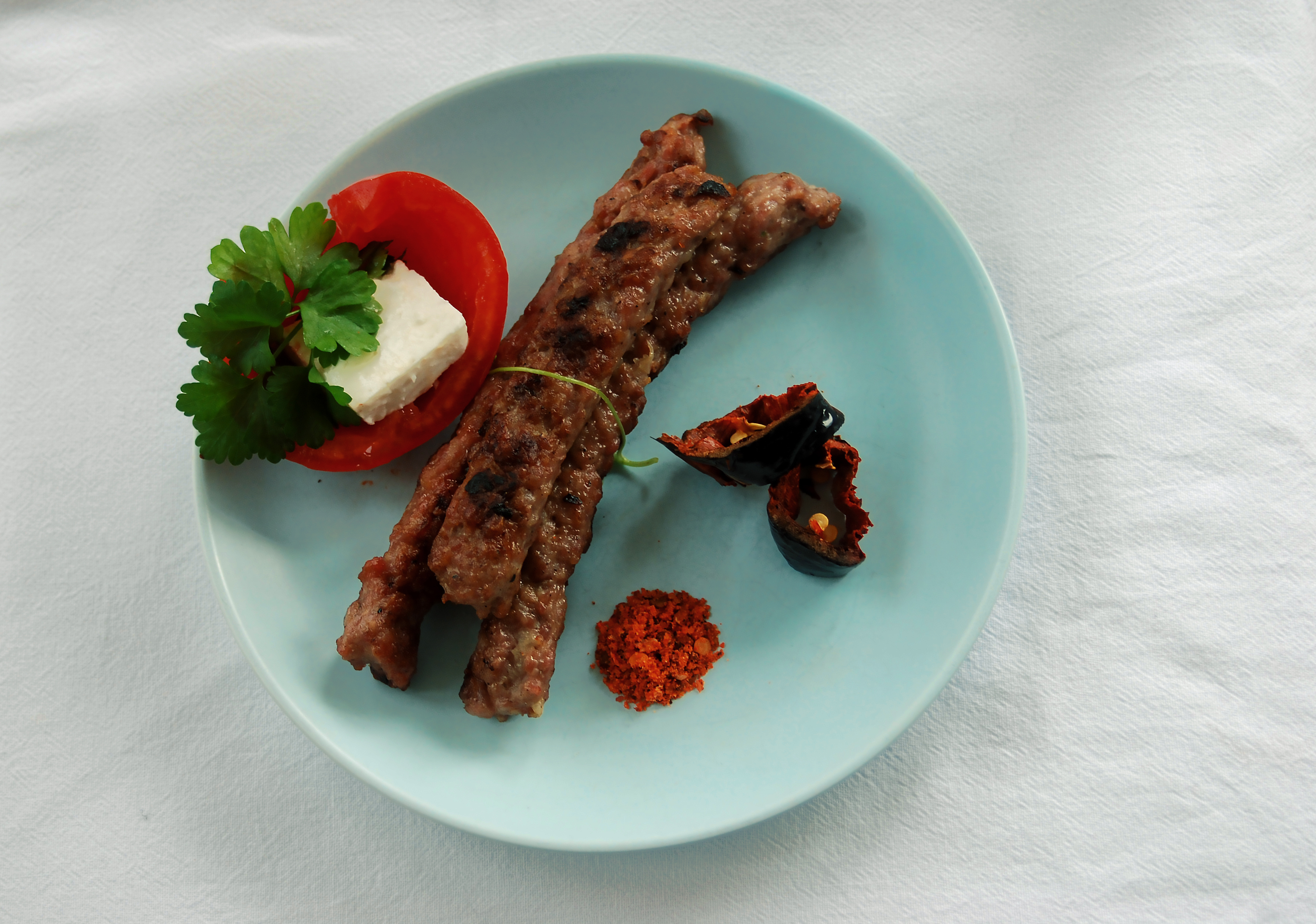
Macedonian ḱebapčinja

Hot Dog Kebapche,originating in Gorna Oryahovitsa, publicly known as the town that makes the "greatest" kebapcheta in the whole of Bulgaria

Kebapche (Bulgarian: кебапче, plural: кебапчета, kebapcheta; ḱebapče, Macedonian: ќебапче, plural: ќебапчиња, ḱebapčinja) is a Bulgarian dish of grilled minced meat with spices. The meat is shaped into an elongated cylindrical form, similar to a hot dog. Typically, a mix of pork and beef is used, although some recipes involve only pork. The preferred spices are black pepper, cumin and salt. Kebapche is a grilled food. It is never fried or baked.

A typical addition to a kebapche meal are chips (French fries), often covered with grated sirene (fresh white cheese similar to feta); lyutenitsa is sometimes used as a dip. The expression a three kebapcheta with sides (тройка кебапчета с гарнитура, troika kebapcheta s garnitura) is particularly well-known. The preferred drink to go with a kebapche is beer. The kebapche is well known for its important place in Bulgarian Cuisine.

The word kebapche is derived from kebab, –che is a diminutive Bulgarian neutral suffix, i.e. a "little kebab". A dish similar to kebapche and often combined with it is kyufte, which is often the same in terms of meat and spices but round-shaped. It often includes onions and parsley, which kebapche does not.

It is essentially the same dish as former Yugoslav ćevapčići, but the Bulgarian kebapcheta are typically larger.

== See also ==
- Mici (mititei), a Romanian dish
- Cevapi , a Former Yugoslav dish
