= Kulajda =

Czech soup

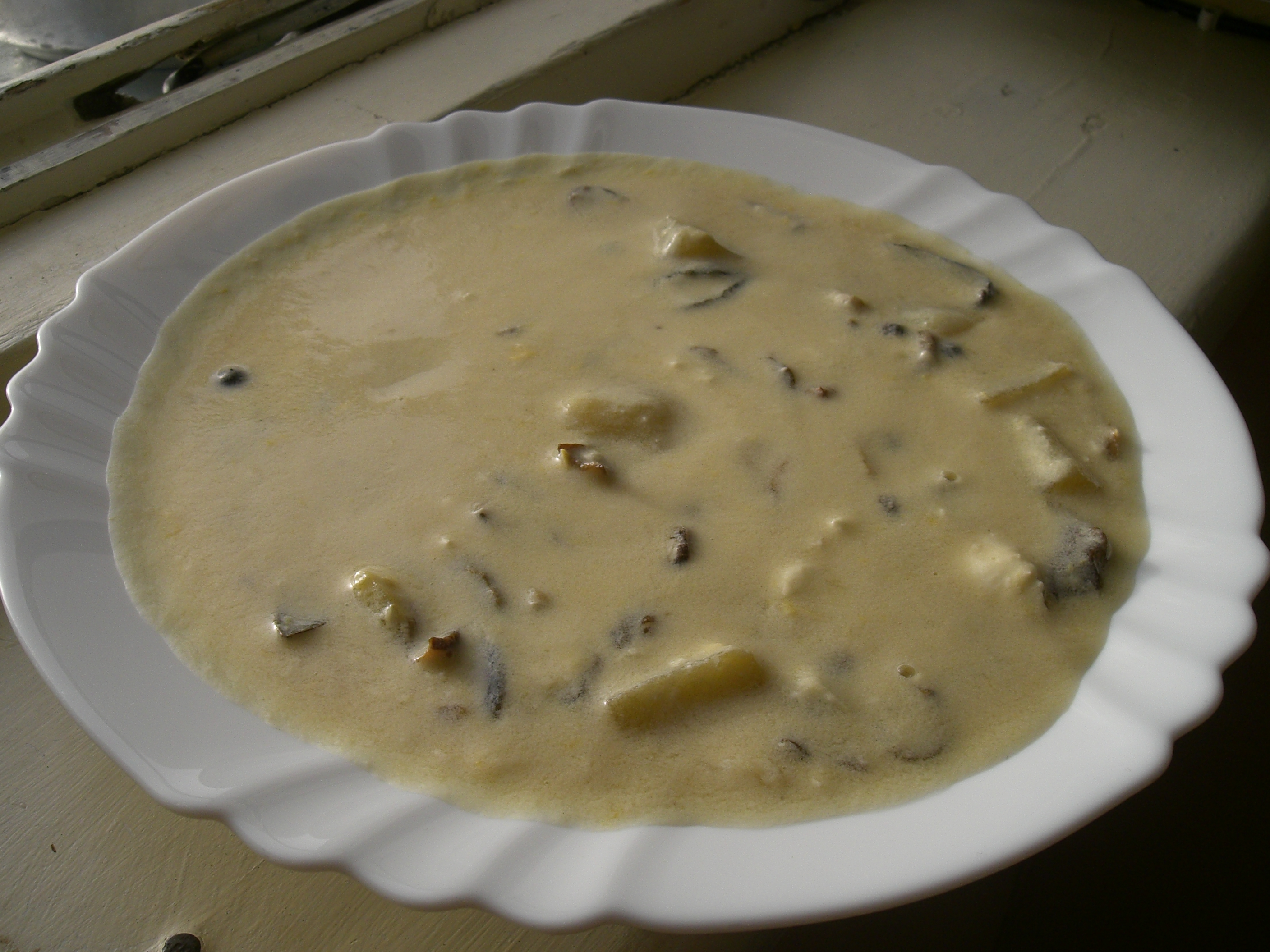
- The south Bohemian kulajda soup
- Type: Soup
- Place of origin: Czech Republic
- Main ingredients: Sour cream, potatoes, dill, quail eggs, mushrooms

Kulajda is a soup from Czech cuisine. One version is made with sour cream, potatoes, dill and quail egg. Mushrooms are also an important ingredient of the soup.

In some regions another sour mushroom-based Czech soup kyselo is mistakenly referred to as kulajda. The difference is that kyselo uses sourdough and (most of the time) neither sour cream nor milk.
