= Ćevapi =

Dish from southeast Europe

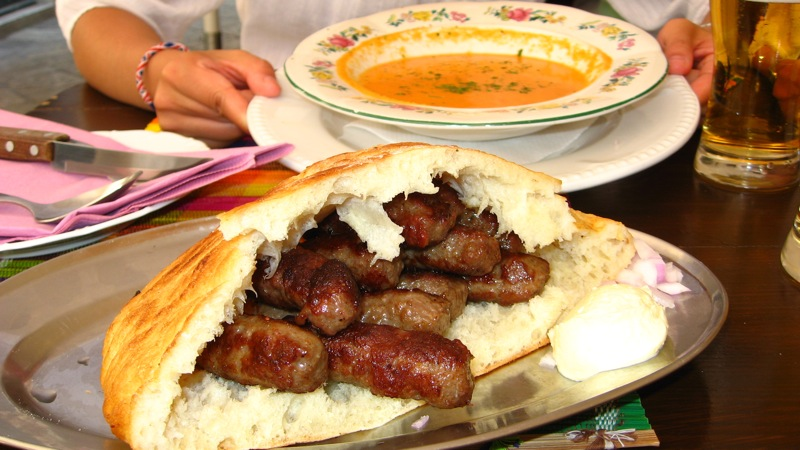
- Alternative names: Ćevapčići, Kebapi
- Course: Main course
- Place of origin: Bosnia and Herzegovina, Serbia
- Region or state: Southeast Europe
- Serving temperature: Hot
- Main ingredients: Meat (lamb, veal, pork or beef), salt

Ćevapi (Serbian Cyrillic: ћевапи, pronounced [tɕeʋǎːpi]) is a grilled dish of minced meat popular in Southeast Europe and countries of former Yugoslavia, where it originated. It is considered a national dish of Bosnia and Herzegovina and Serbia. They are usually served in groups of five to ten pieces on a plate or in a flatbread (lepinja or somun), often with chopped onions, kajmak, ajvar (optional), and salt. Today, the grill shops are known as ćevabdžinica (pl. ćevabdžinice).

Bosnian ćevapi are made from two types of minced beef meat, hand-mixed and formed with a funnel, while Serbian ćevapčići are made of beef, lamb, pork, or a mixture.

== Name and etymology ==
The word ćevap is derived from the Ottoman Turkish kebap. The word is sometimes used in conjunction with the common South Slavic diminutive ending -čići/-čiči. Albanian: qebapë; Bulgarian: кебапчета, romanized: kebapcheta; Romanian: cevapcici or mici sârbești; Serbo-Croatian: ćevapi / ћевапи; Macedonian: ќебапи/ќебапчиња, romanized: ḱebapi/ḱebapčinja; Slovak: čevabčiči; Slovene: čevapčiči. The word ćevapi is plural; the singular form ćevap is rarely used, as a typical serving consists of several ćevapi. In Serbia, ćevapi and the diminutive form ćevapčići is used. The version ćevapčići (Serbian Cyrillic: ћевапчићи) is used more frequently in Serbia, but today is also used in Bosnia and Herzegovina.

== History ==
=== Name and Ottoman background ===
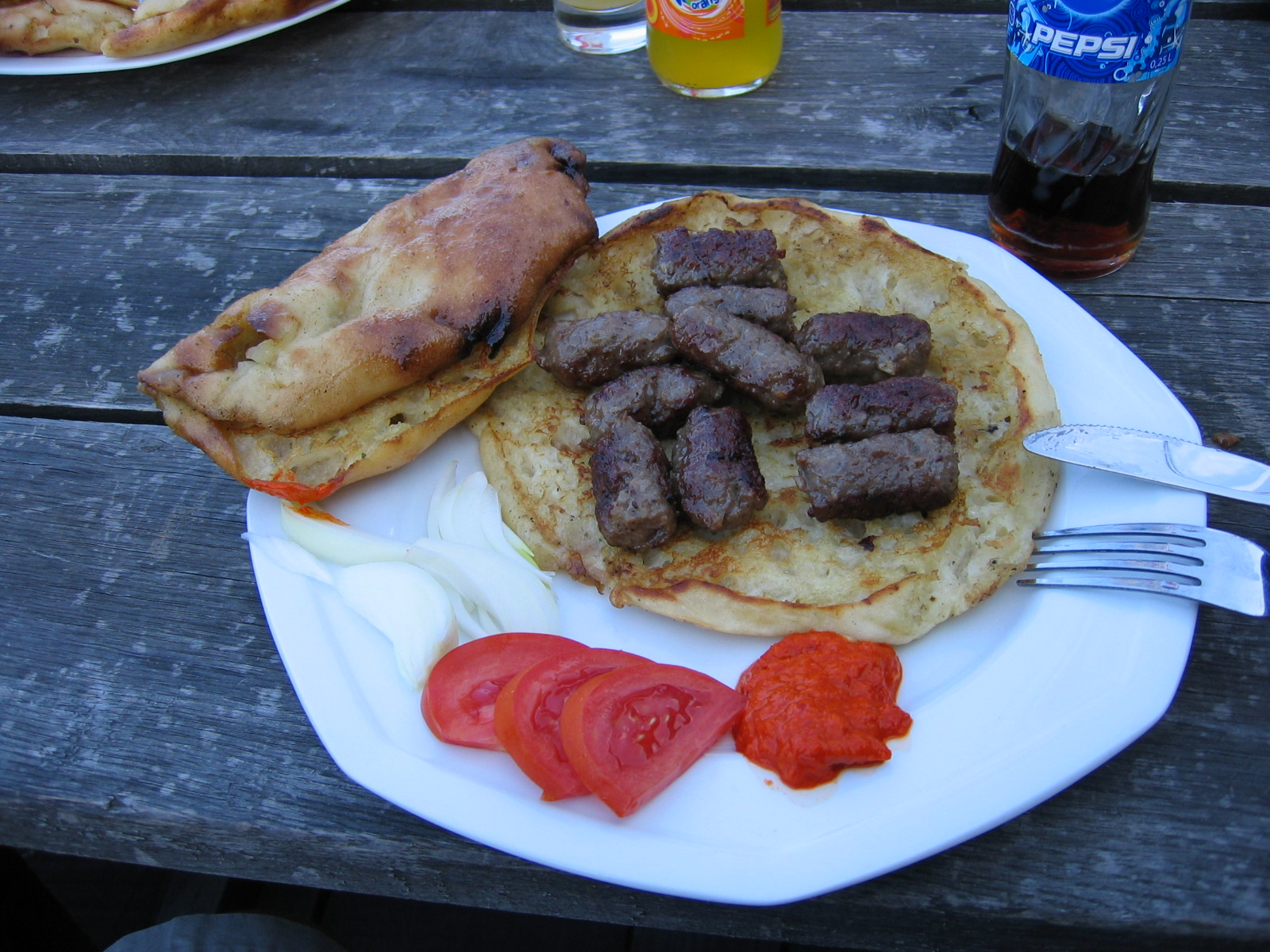
Bosnian ćevapi in lepinja, served with ajvar

The word ćevap derives, through Ottoman Turkish kebap, from Arabic kabāb; ćevapčići is a South Slavic diminutive. In Bosnian usage the borrowed term long covered a wider family of meat dishes than the grilled minced-meat rolls it denotes today: Alija Lakišić's Bosanski kuhar (1975) defines ćevab as pieces of boiled or braised meat served with sauce, a sense preserved in dish names such as hadžijski ćevap, papaz ćevab, slatki ćevab and šiš-ćevap. The specialised ćevabdžijski trade is generally described as having differentiated out of the older aščijski (cook's) craft of the Ottoman-era čaršija.

Grilled and skewered minced-meat preparations are attested across the Ottoman world, and the dish belongs to a broad köfte/kebab family whose members spread through the Balkans under Ottoman rule. Suraiya Faroqhi has shown that an extensive market in cheap, ready-cooked meat dishes existed in early modern Istanbul and other Ottoman towns, serving students, merchants and travellers whose lodgings offered little opportunity to cook. Closely related dishes are prepared throughout the region, including Bulgarian kebapche, Romanian mititei, Macedonian kebapi and Albanian qebapa.

No reference to ćevapi as a distinct dish has been identified in medieval or early Ottoman sources from the region. Historians Slavojka Beštić-Bronza and Boro Bronza note that the dish is absent from Konstantin Jireček's survey of medieval Serbian and Bosnian foodways, from the Sarajevo chronicle of Mula Mustafa Bašeskija (covering the later 18th century), and from the 18th-century chronicles of the Bosnian Franciscan friars of Fojnica, Kreševo and Kraljeva Sutjeska.

=== Nineteenth century and the Leskovac grill trade ===
The term ćevapi appears in documents from the former Yugoslav regions from the 1850s onward. Beštić-Bronza and Bronza situate this within the growth of a commercial cooked-meat trade along the corridor between Istanbul and the Ottoman Empire's northwestern frontier, with Edirne, Thessaloniki, Skopje, Bitola, Sofia and Niš functioning as centres. Leskovac, in Ottoman territory until 1878, developed a particular reputation for grilled minced-meat dishes.

Migration from southern Serbia carried the Leskovac grill repertoire — ćevapi, pljeskavica, mućkalica and others — to Belgrade, where it became a widely sold form of prepared food. The writer Branislav Nušić, who wrote several early accounts of the Belgrade trade, reported that the Rajić kafana had ćevapi on its menu by the 1860s and that grill shops multiplied around the city's main market, the Velika pijaca (today Studentski Trg); these accounts are anecdotal rather than documentary. In Belgrade the shops were known as ćevabdžija (pl. ćevabdžije); an ethnographic survey of 1927–28 records that customers ate either inside or in the street, often as takeaway, and that the dish was commonly bought for breakfast. By 1932 ćevapčići were described as a local speciality in southern Serbia, Skopje and Peja. A 1920 letter from the Caru cu Bere restaurant in Bucharest describing the recipe for mititei stated that the dish had come from Serbia.

An interwar account attributes the dish's spread northwest partly to the posting of Serbian officials to Slovenia and other regions and to labour migration; the ethnologist Dragana Radojičić notes that restaurants in Maribor carried ćevapi by 1933 and that Serbian dishes such as sarma entered Slovene home cooking in the same period. A claim that Ottoman-era hajduks prepared a precursor called hajdučki ćevap from meat and smoked lard on a skewer is repeated in popular accounts but rests on no contemporary evidence.

=== Socialist Yugoslavia and the modern regional styles ===
The Second World War interrupted the dish's spread, and the postwar abolition of the private sector closed many of the grill restaurants that had carried it. Private catering revived from the 1960s, and it is in this period that the regional styles recognised today took their modern form. In Belgrade, the Leskovac grill chef Miodrag Gligorijević, known as "Bure", popularised the mixed-grill platter Leskovački voz ("Leskovac train"); he cooked for Josip Broz Tito and his guests, including Elizabeth II and the British royal family during their 1972 visit.

In Bosnia and Herzegovina the specialised ćevabdžinica emerged in the same decades. The association of Sarajevo ćevabdžije, in the product specification submitted for geographical protection, describes ćevapi as having earlier been sold by the piece to market-day crowds, travellers and traders, and dates the consolidation of the present Sarajevo form to the 1950s and 1960s; it identifies Teškent, opened by the Salihbegović family at Baščaršija in the 1950s, as the first dedicated shop, followed by Ferhatović in the Telali quarter, Mrkva (1963) and Nune (1966). The footballer Asim Ferhatović ran the Devetka shop, later renamed Petica. Beštić-Bronza and Bronza, surveying 20th-century Bosnian scholarship on local crafts and gastronomy, argue that ćevapi were not eaten in Bosnia and Herzegovina before the 20th century, on the grounds that the dish is not mentioned in Hamdija Kreševljaković's studies of the Sarajevo guilds — which do treat the bakers (ekmekčije), butchers (kasapi) and cooks (aščije) — nor in later work on Bosnian food and drink. Their case rests on the absence of references rather than on positive evidence, and competing dates circulate locally: the Banja Luka chain "Kod Muje" advertises a founding date of 1923, while the same authors report testimony that its founder, Mujo Đuzel, arrived in the city from Glamoč only in the 1960s.

Distinct local styles are now recognised across the country. Sarajevo ćevapi are finger-shaped and served in a dry somun; the Banja Luka style joins four rolls into a flat block and uses a lepinja dipped in a meat-fat sauce; the Travnik version combines a Sarajevo-like shape with the softened bread, and Tuzla and Zenica have their own variants.

=== Spread abroad and commercial protection ===
From the 1970s ćevapi became a fixture of the tourist trade on the Yugoslav Adriatic coast, where they came to rival the traditional fish menu in popularity with visitors from Germany and Austria, and labour migration carried the dish into central Europe; by the 1980s West German supermarket chains stocked frozen Ćevapčići. Ćevapčići became an everyday food in Slovenia as a result of 20th-century migration from Bosnia and Herzegovina and Serbia. The dish is now found wherever there are substantial diaspora communities from the former Yugoslavia.

Leskovac hosts an annual grill festival, the Leskovac Grill Festival. A Ćevap fest has been held in Banja Luka since January 2018, drawing more than 20,000 visitors at its second edition later that year and subsequently scheduled each spring.

Several varieties have since been registered under Bosnian food-quality schemes. In August 2024 "Sarajevski ćevapi"/"Sarajevski ćevapčići" — defined as a product of fresh beef and salt made within Sarajevo Canton — became the eighth food product in Bosnia and Herzegovina to receive a protected geographical indication, on an application by the association of Sarajevo ćevabdžije supported by the City of Sarajevo; an application for registration at European Union level was under preparation in late 2025. Banjalučki ćevap received a traditional speciality guaranteed (garantovano tradicionalni specijalitet) designation in September 2024, and the city began issuing the mark to qualifying grill houses in 2026. Banjalučki ćevap is also inscribed on the tentative list of intangible heritage maintained by the State Commission of Bosnia and Herzegovina for UNESCO, with a view to eventual nomination to the UNESCO list.

=== Origin disputes ===
Competing claims to the dish's invention are a recurring feature of public debate in the successor states of Yugoslavia, and have been examined by historians as an object of study in their own right. Beštić-Bronza and Bronza treat ćevapi as a case of gastronomic "brandification", arguing that local traditions presented as ancient in Sarajevo, Banja Luka, Travnik and elsewhere rarely predate the 1960s, and comparing the phenomenon with disputes over the origins of the hamburger, Frikadelle and Swedish köttbullar. Writing on Ottoman and post-Ottoman foodways more generally, Arkadiusz Blaszczyk and Stefan Rohdewald describe the retrospective nationalisation of shared Ottoman-era dishes as a widespread regional pattern; Stefan Detchev's study of shopska salad traces a comparable trajectory from a 20th-century innovation to a national culinary symbol. Nušić, by contrast, had presented ćevapi in the 1920s as a unifying Yugoslav emblem comparable to Hungarian goulash or Italian pasta — a reading the same historians describe as the exaggeration of a Yugoslav nationalist.

== Varieties ==
There are variations in meat content and seasoning, usually salt and pepper. The dish is kept simple, and traditionally served with a type of flatbread called somun (similar to Turkish bazlama) or a more "bready" variant called lepinja, with chopped onions or kajmak and yogurt as appetizer.

- Leskovac-style ćevapi (Leskovački ćevapi) from Serbia are made from minced meat, usually a mix of pork and beef, seasoned with salt, pepper, and sometimes garlic. The meat is hand-shaped into small cylindrical ćevaps, which are grilled over charcoal, giving them a distinctive smoky flavor and juiciness. They are slightly longer and thinner than other variations and are usually served in portions of five to ten pieces. They are traditionally served with fresh somun or lepinja, accompanied by chopped onions, hot peppers, ajvar, and sour cream. The Leskovac ćevapi is the original.
- Sarajevo-style ćevapi (Sarajevski ćevapi) from Bosnia have standardised production and are made exclusively from beef, from cattle that is between 6 and 19 months old. The raw individual product of "Sarajevo ćevap" should be the traditional length of "four fingers together" (between 6 and 10 cm), with a diameter of 1 to 2 cm, and an average portion (10 pieces) weighing 200 to 250 grams. They have to be produced in administrative area of Sarajevo Canton, while raw material can be obtained from other localities. The bread is always dry. According to urban legends, the first Ćevapi-restaurant in Sarajevo, and the first Sarajevo version of Ćevapi, was established by a shop-owner called Čiko in the late 1950s. Another claim is that the first Ćevapi-restaurant in Sarajevo was established by the Ferhatović family in 1956. In 2024, production of Sarajevo-style ćevap was standardised and it received Protected designation of geographical origin by Food Safety Agency of Bosnia and Herzegovina.
- Banja Luka-style ćevapi (Banjalučki ćevapi) from Bosnia differ from all others because they are prepared as a meat tile typically consisting of four ćevapi connected in a row. They are usually made just with ground beef, salt, and pepper. According to the traditional recipe, garlic is added to "Banjalučki ćevap", the mixture must be aged for at least 36 hours at a very low temperature. The lepinja bread is always dipped in sauce. The Banja Luka-style with four merged fingers was invented in the 1960s by Mujo Đuzel who moved from Glamoč. In 2024, Association for the Preservation of the Guaranteed Tradition of the "Banjalučki ćevap" specialty, applied for protected designation of geographical origin.
- Travnik-style ćevapi (Travnički ćevapi) from Bosnia are made with a combination of beef, veal, and lamb, with the addition of salt, pepper, and a bit of baking soda. When grilled, the meat is often brushed with a clear broth that was prepared with beef bones and mutton. The bread, locally called pitica, is dipped in the broth, then grilled for a short time. Once grilled, the ćevapi are placed into the pitica, and they are then topped with chopped onions. It is recommended to serve this ćevapi variety with yogurt on the side. The Travnik version is a mixture of the Sarajevo and Banja Luka ćevapi, shaped as the Sarajevan, with the lepinja dipped as in the Banja Lukan version.
- Tuzla-style ćevapi (Tuzlanski ćevapi) from Bosnia are usually made with a combination of ground mutton, beef, and lamb (usually in a ratio of 2:1:1), although some places prepare them only with beef. The meat is mixed by hand and seasoned with salt and pepper, and it is recommended to leave the meat combination in the refrigerator for a few hours or a whole day before the preparation. These ćevapi are cooked on an oiled grill, and once done, they are typically seasoned with pepper once more. Tuzlanski ćevapi are served in a round flatbread called lepinja, which has previously been dipped in a broth made from beef bones called poljev or poliv. Spring onions or raw chopped onions are traditional accompaniments to this meat dish.
- Novi Pazar-style ćevapi (Pazarski ćevapi) from Serbia are generally made from beef – 70 percent, and should have 30 percent lamb, though it is optional if someone does not want it. They are best served only with onions, although they also contain a bit of onion inside of them. It is often served with hot red pepper. Pazarski ćevapi are slightly larger than other styles of ćevapi.
- Rolled ćevapi (rolovani ćevapi) are rolled with proscuitto (pršuta) or bacon (slanina).
- Gourmet ćevapi (gurmanski ćevapi) are filled with either/or kačkavalj, bacon, spicy peppers.
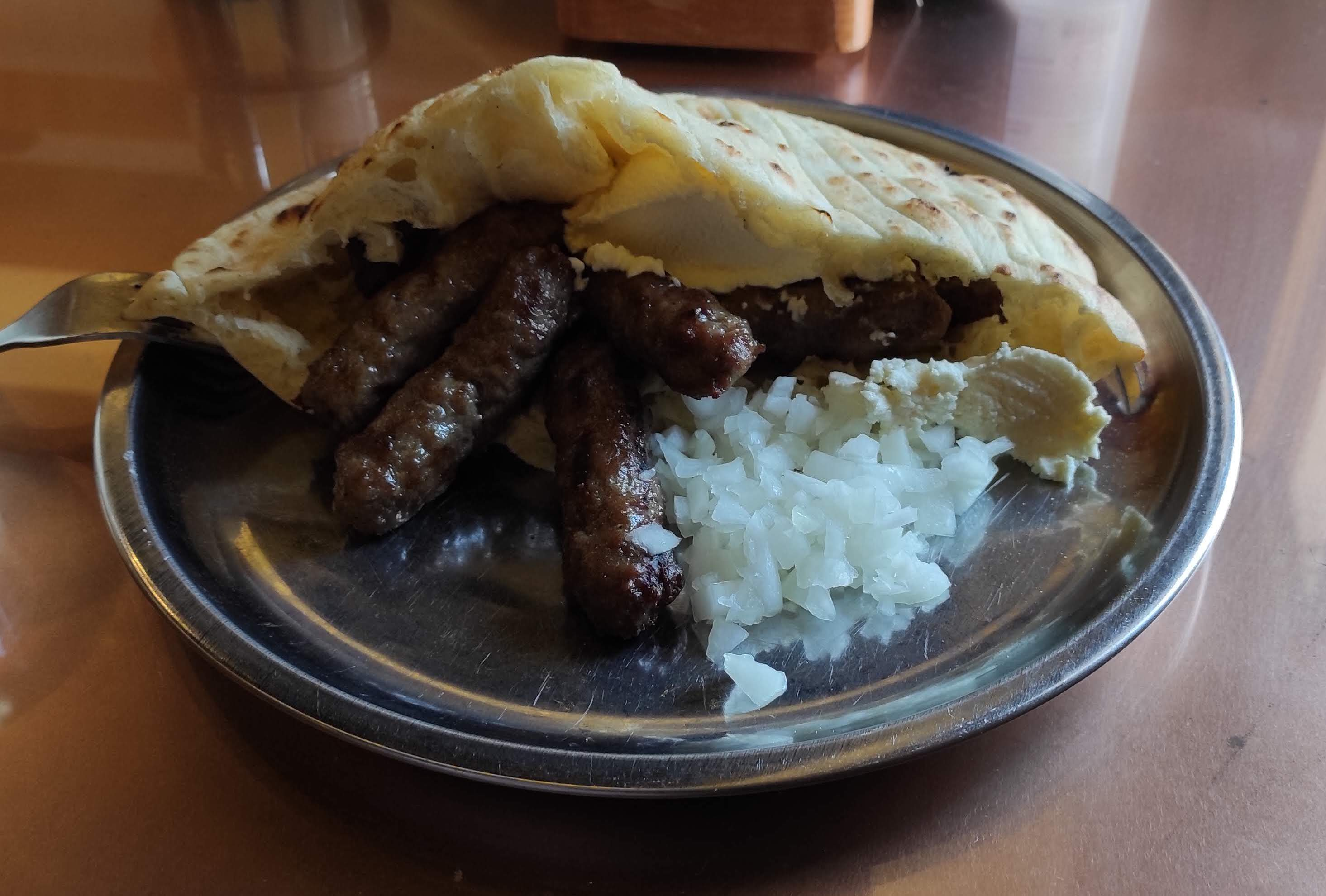
ćevapi served in Sarajevo

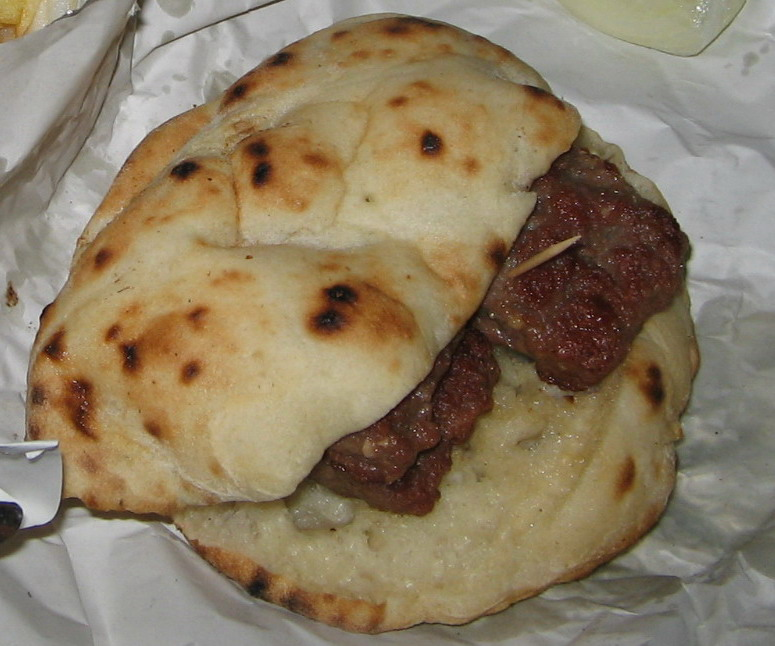
Banja Luka-style ćevapi

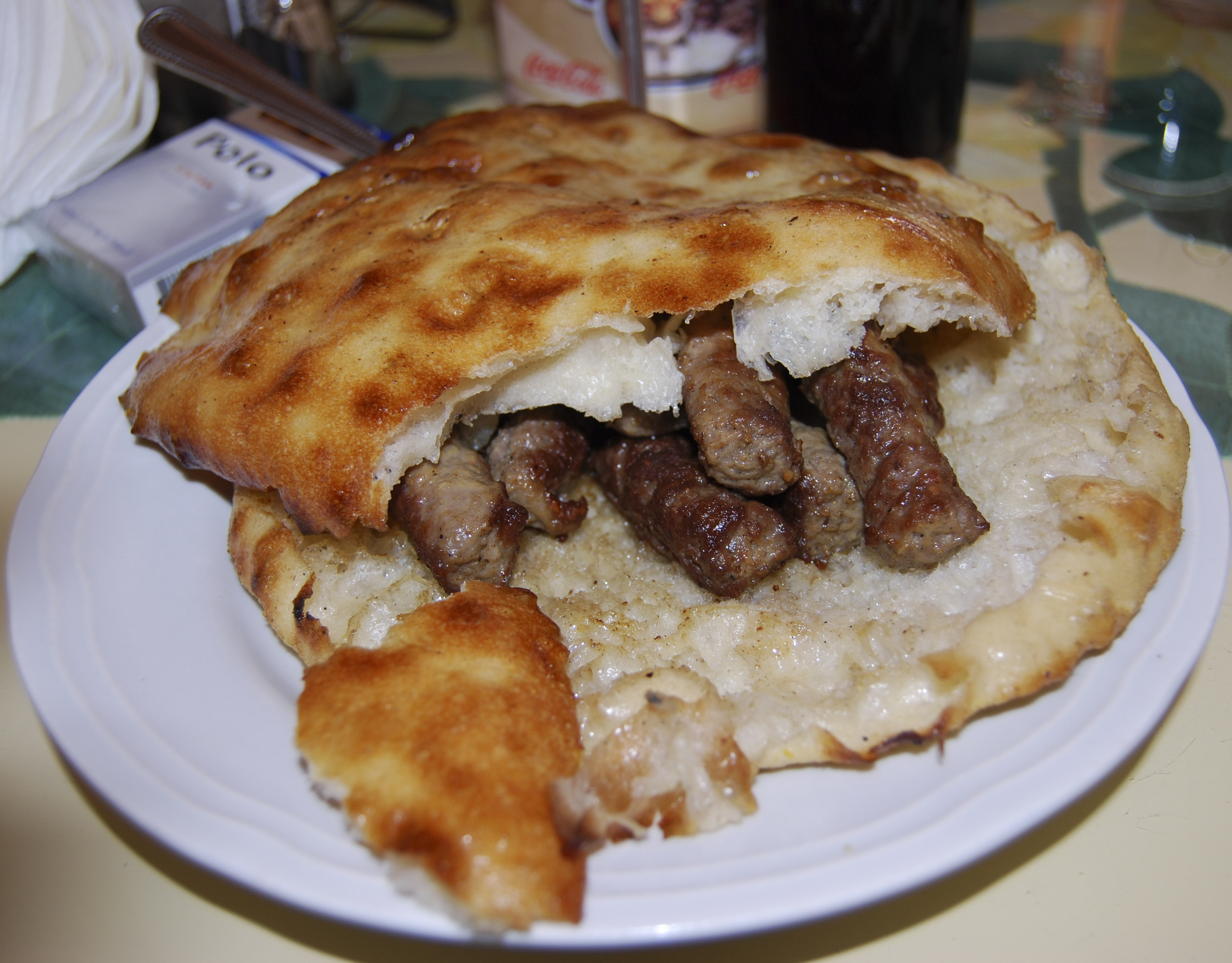
ćevapi served in Travnik

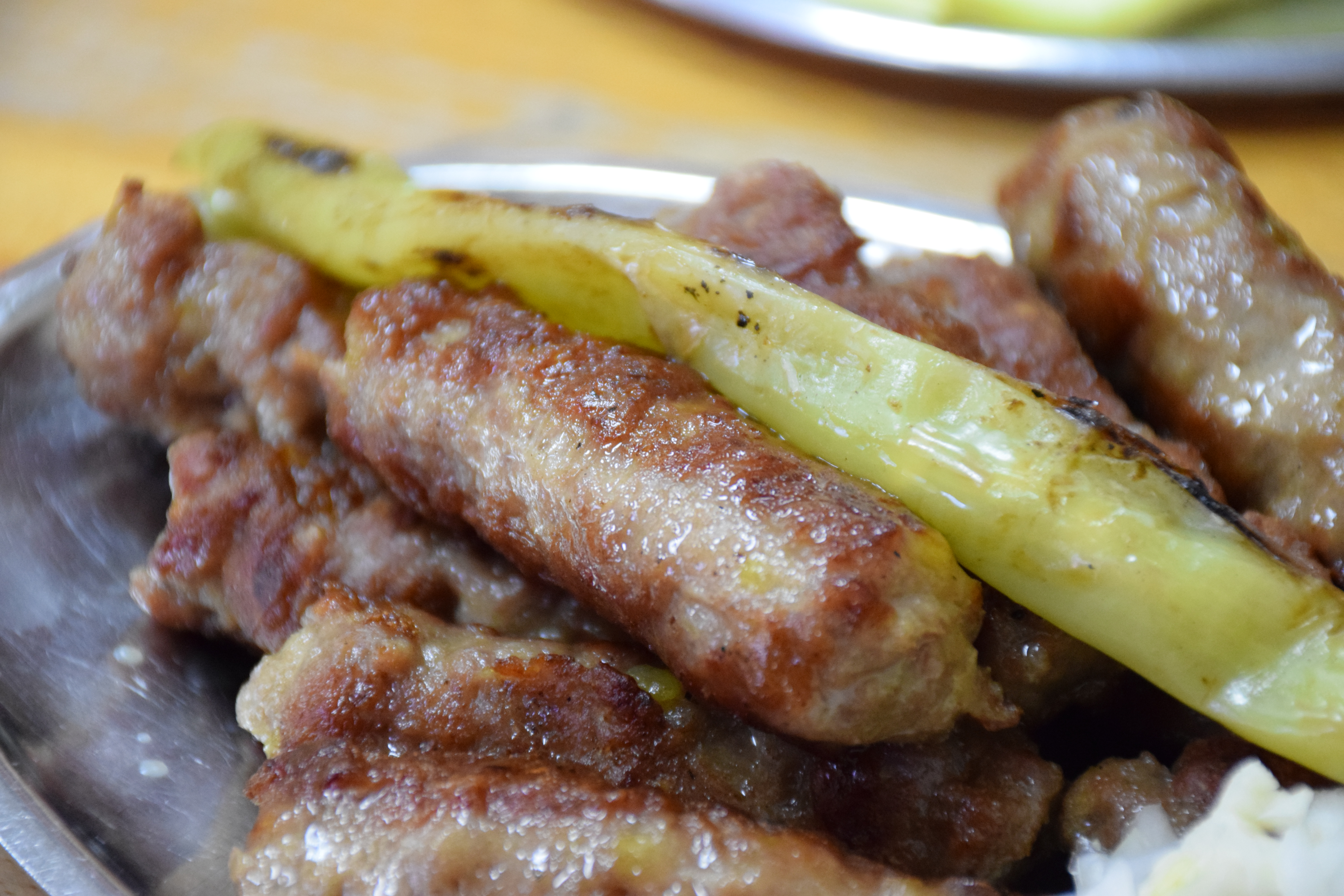
ćevapi served in Novi Pazar

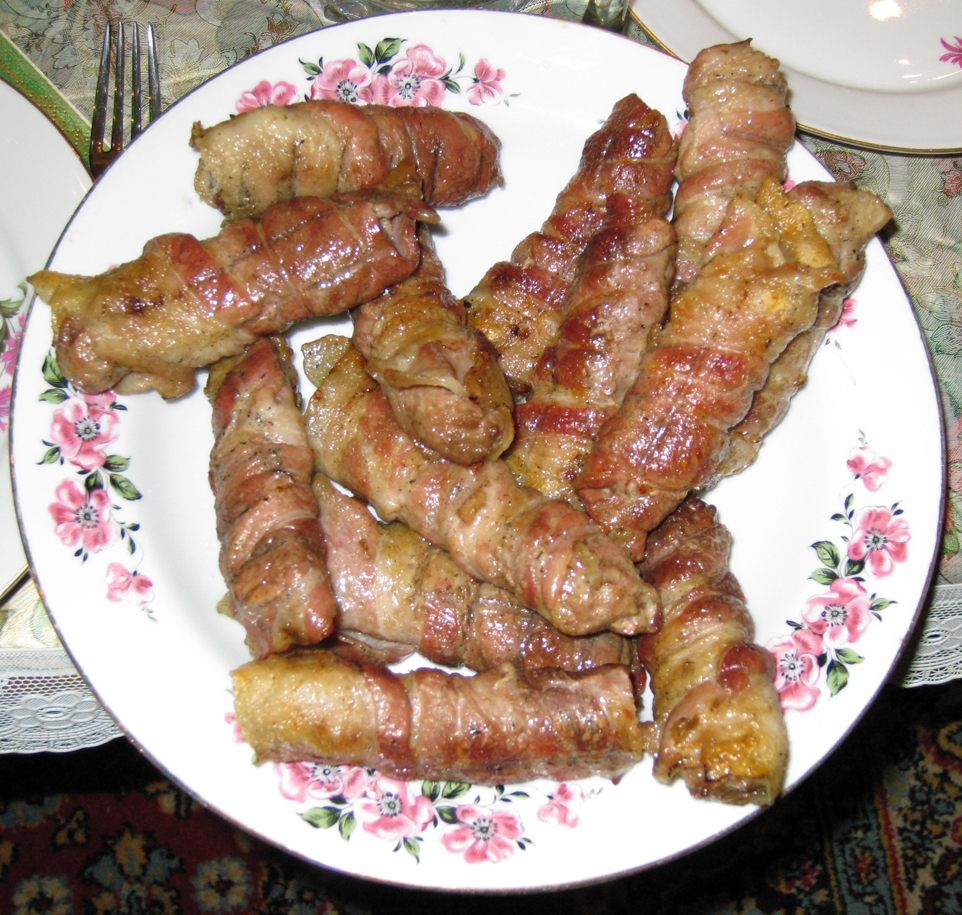
ćevapi rolled in bacon

== See also ==
- Balkan cuisine
- Mititei, a Romanian dish
- Kebapche, a Bulgarian dish
- Kofta
- Kebab
- Kabab koobideh, an Iranian dish
- Lula kebab, an Armenian dish
- Pljeskavica

== Sources ==
- Beštić-Bronza, Slavojka; Bronza, Boro (2020), "Ćevapi: A Paradigm of Yugoslav Gastronomic Brandification", Brotherhood and Unity at the Kitchen Table: Food in Socialist Yugoslavia: 117–131 – via ResearchGate
- Drobnjaković, Borivoje M. (1940), Glasnik [Bulletin], Etnografski muzej u Beogradu, pp. 179–180
- Eugen, Fodor (1962). Fodor's Modern Guides: Yugoslavia. D. McKay.
- Nušić, Branislav Đ. (1996). Vraneš, Aleksandra (ed.). Beogradska čaršija. Ars Libri. pp. 22–30.
- Radojičić, Dragana (2010). "Serbian Dishes on the Slovenian Table". Traditiones. 39 (1): 111–122. doi:10.3986/Traditio2010390110.
- Spasić, Darko (February 1998), "Прилог историјату ћевапчића", Istorijske sveske (in Serbian), 3, Srpsko nasleđe
