= Pârjoale =

Romanian and Moldovan meatballs

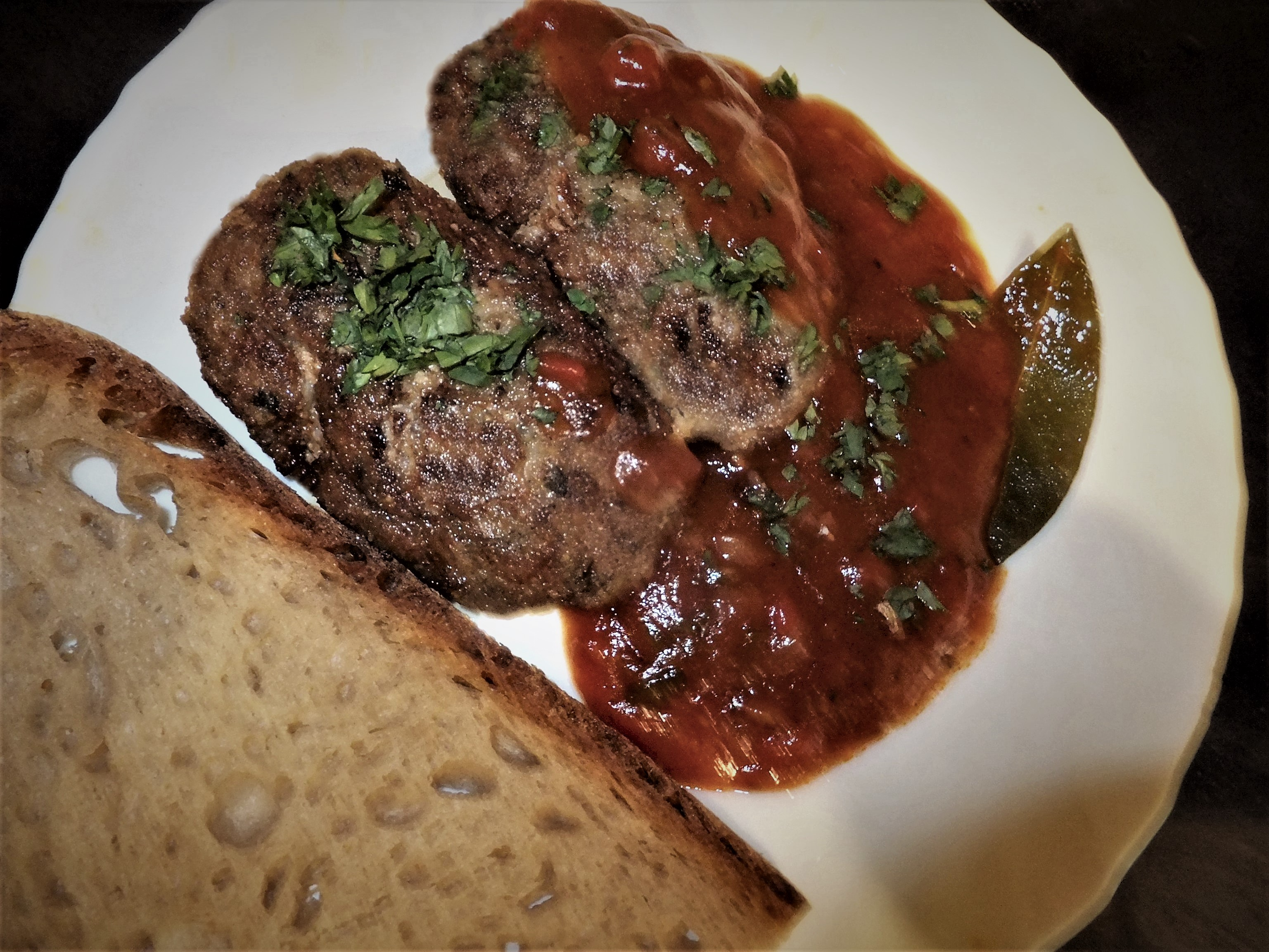
Pârjoale

Pârjoale (also called Moldavian pârjoale; Romanian: Pârjoale moldovenești), plural form of pârjoală, are Romanian and Moldovan meatballs, usually minced pork and beef (sometimes lamb or chicken) mixed with eggs, grated potatoes, slices of bread soaked in milk or water, chopped onions, herbs (parsley, dill, thyme), spices (pepper) and salt, homogenized to form balls which are flattened to an elongated shape, passed through bread crumbs, and fried in hot oil. They can also be marinated in a tomato sauce.

== See also ==
- Chiftele
- Perișoare
- Mititei
- Dry meatballs
