= Hapanvelli =

Traditional Finnish soup

- Type: Porridge
- Place of origin: Finland
- Main ingredients: Rye sourdough starter, potatoes, peas

Hapanvelli (Finnish pronunciation: [ˈhɑpɑnˌʋelːi], lit. 'sour gruel') is a traditional South-Eastern Finnish dish that resembles pea soup but has a more sour flavour. It takes roughly an hour to prepare hapanvelli, which is made from a rye sourdough starter, potatoes and peas. It is traditionally served with a pat of butter and cold milk.

Hapanvelli is a traditional dish of the Virolahti municipality which has an annual summertime Virolahti Week (Virolahti-viikko) during which hapanvelli is sold. There is also a contest during Virolahti Week in which the best cook gets the title of Miss Hapanvelli (Hapanvellimissi).

== See also ==
- List of porridges
- Sour rye soup
