= Borș de burechiușe =

Romanian and Moldovan dish

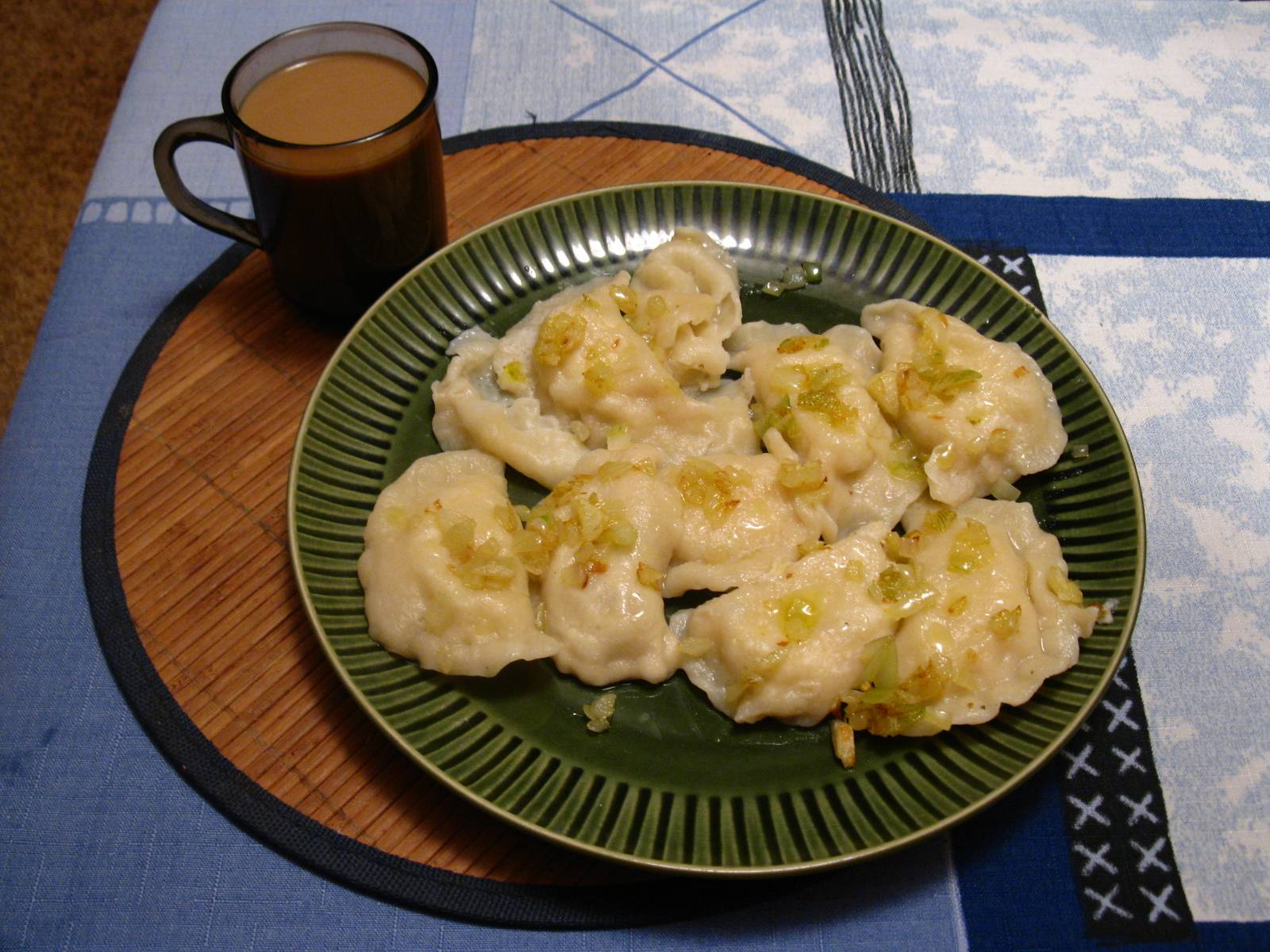
- A plate of burechiușe (Romanian dumplings with mushrooms)
- Alternative names: Borș de burechițe
- Type: Soup
- Place of origin: Romania
- Region or state: Bukovina
- Main ingredients: Dough, mushrooms, ciorbă

Borș de burechiușe or borș de burechițe is a Romanian and Moldovan dish specifically from the regional cuisines of Moldova and of Bukovina. Burechiușe or gălușcă, also known as urechiușe (little ears), is dough in the shape of a ravioli-like square which is filled with mushrooms such as Boletus edulis, and sealed around its edges and boiled in a ciorbă. The borș de burechiușe are traditionally eaten on the last day of fasting at Christmas Eve.

== Etymology ==
In Bukovina and Moldavia regions, the word borș is a synonym of the soup called ciorbă. The etymology of burechiușe is not clear. Burechițe may derive its name from the Turkish börek, indicating cultural and culinary influences coming from the Ottoman Empire. It could also take its name from that of the mushroom boletus, burete in its rhotacized Romanian language version, by the pattern of the ravioli.

== See also ==
- Börek
- Colțunași
- Chiburekki
- List of soups
- Moldovan cuisine
- Romanian cuisine
