= Gagauz cuisine =

Culinary traditions of Gagauzia

Gagauz cuisine refers to the culinary practices of the Gagauz people. Its emphasis on dairy products and meats can be traced to the Gagauz's nomadic past, while the importance of grains as a staple food reflects their current farming lifestyle.

The Gagauz maintain a unique method of processing milk and preserve meat, curds, and sheep milk cheese in animal skins. Prepared dishes include a version of head cheese, or cold cuts in jelly prepared from the heads and feet of livestock (traditionally served during holidays), and kurban, which combines bulgur wheat porridge with meat from a ritually slaughtered ram. Gagauz meat dishes are often accompanied by peppered sauces.

Many family holidays and rituals are connected with the baking of bread, wheat loaves (kalaches), and unleavened flatcakes. Pies are also common, with popular variants being layered pies stuffed with sheep milk cheese and doused with sour cream before baking, pies with crumbled pumpkin, and sweet pies made from the first milk of a cow that had just calved.

Red wine is served with most meals.

== See also ==
- Moldovan cuisine
