= Murături =

Pickled vegetables of the Romanian cuisine

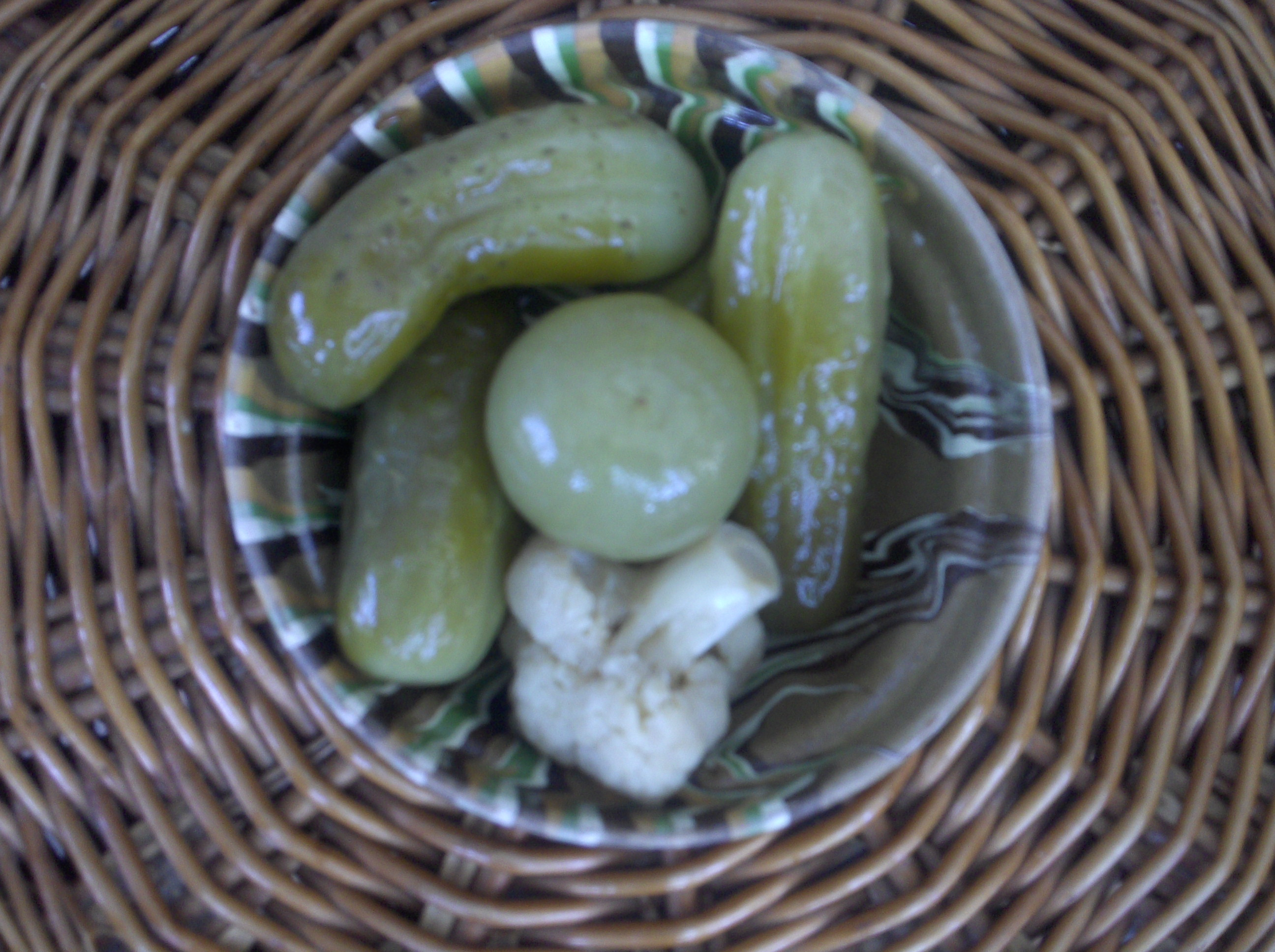
Some murături (with cucumbers, green tomato, and cauliflower)

Murături (Romanian for pickles) are vegetables or fruit pickled in brine, with added dill, oak leaves, celery and others for flavoring and preservation, as found in Romanian cuisine and Moldovan cuisine. The pickles are ordinarily made of locally grown produce such as beetroot, cucumber, green tomatoes (Romanian: gogonele), carrots, cabbage, bell peppers, watermelons, mushrooms, turnips, celery and cauliflower.

After fermentation, the pickle juice becomes sour and is sometimes used in soups such as borsch.

== See also ==
- Torshi – Procedure of preserving food in brine or vinegar
- Tsukemono – Japanese preserved vegetables
- Pickled cucumber – Small pickled and fermented cucumber
