= Chiftele =

Romanian meatballs

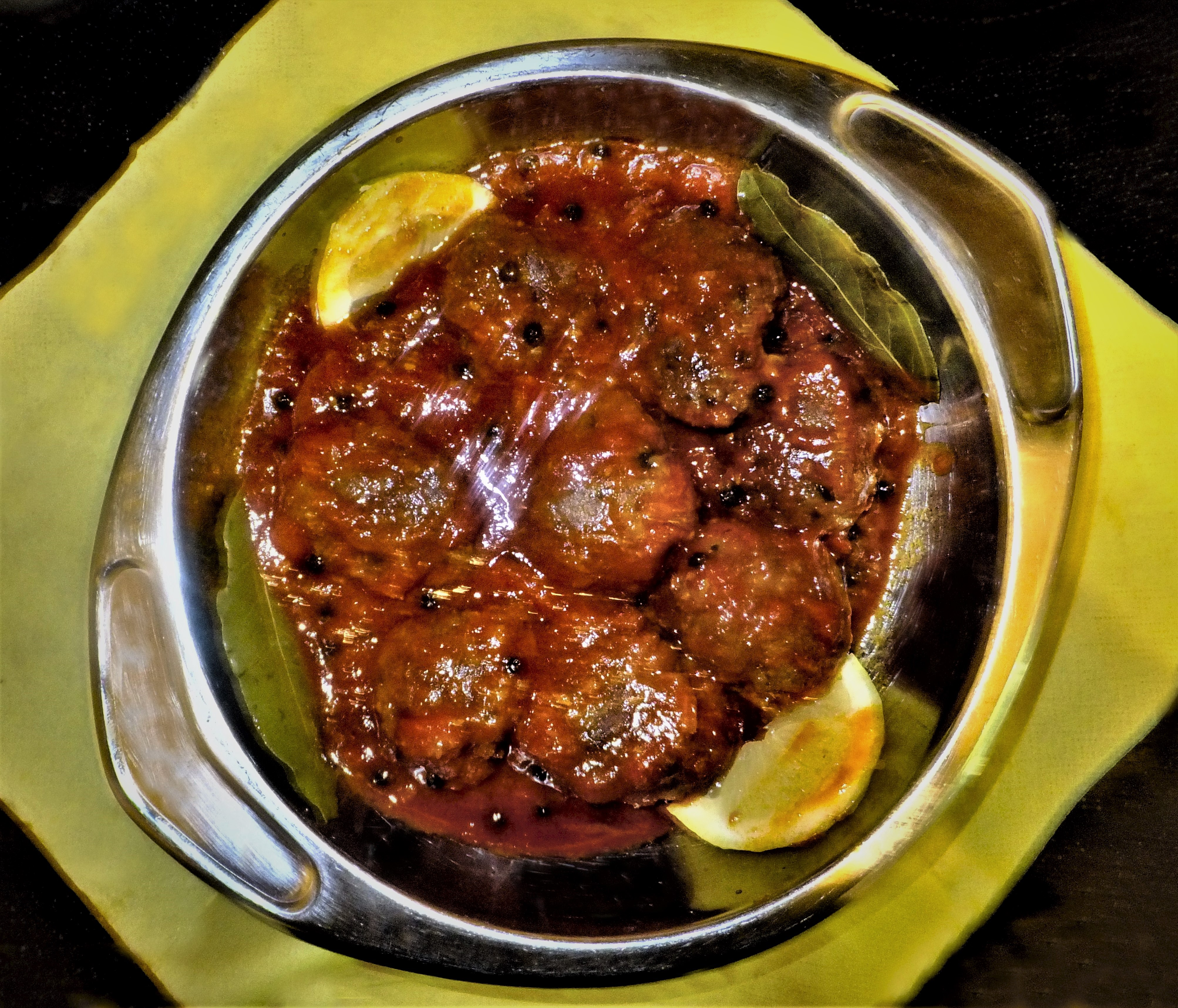
Marinated chiftele

Chiftele are flat and round meatballs from traditional Romanian cuisine. Chiftele are usually deep-fried minced pork, mixed with mashed potatoes and spices. Chiftele is traditionally served with pilaf or mashed potatoes. A variant of chiftele has rice mixed inside the meatball, and is called perişoare. Perişoare are usually added to sour soup to make another dish called ciorbă de perişoare. Another variant of chiftele is called chiftele de peşte (fish chiftele) and is a fishcake made from carp.

== Etymology ==
The word chiftea comes from köfte, which is the Turkish word for kofta.

== History ==
Centuries of Ottoman presence in Romania has left some variations from the Turkish culinary arts. Chiftele is the Romanian version of Turkish köfte.

== See also ==
- List of meatball dishes
- Mititei
- Pârjoale
