= Bosnia and Herzegovina cuisine =

Culinary traditions of Bosnia and Herzegovina

Bosnian cuisine (Bosnian: bosanska kuhinja) is the traditional cuisine of Bosnia and Herzegovina. It is influenced by Ottoman, Austro-Hungarian (Austrian and Hungarian) and Balkan cuisines.

== Ingredients ==
Bosnian cuisine is a mixture of the local regions such as the Balkan countries, Greece, Italy and Turkey, with many recipes coming from the Ottoman era. It uses some spices, but usually in moderate quantities. Most dishes are light, as they are cooked in lots of water; the sauces are often natural, consisting of little more than the natural juices of the vegetables in the dish. Typical ingredients include tomatoes, potatoes, onions, garlic, bell peppers, cucumbers, carrots, cabbage, mushrooms, spinach, zucchini, dried and fresh beans, plums, milk, paprika and cream called pavlaka and kajmak. Typical meat dishes include primarily beef and lamb due to the Islamic faith of the Bosnian Muslims, although the Bosnian Croats and Bosnian Serbs can consume pork. Some local specialties are ćevapi, burek (börek), 'zeljanica' spinach pie spanakopita, 'sirnica' cheese pie, 'paprike' stuffed peppers, sarma, 'pilav' tagliatelle, grah [butter bean soup], cured meats and cheeses (charcuterie) gulaš (goulash), ajvar and a whole range of sweets inspired by the Middle East like baklava. Food is prioritised for being organic and of good quality. Bosnians enjoy many natural fruit juices but often use cordials from various fruits and herbs. The best local wines come from Herzegovina where the climate is suitable for growing grapes. Plum and apple brandy rakija is produced in Bosnia.

== Meat dishes ==
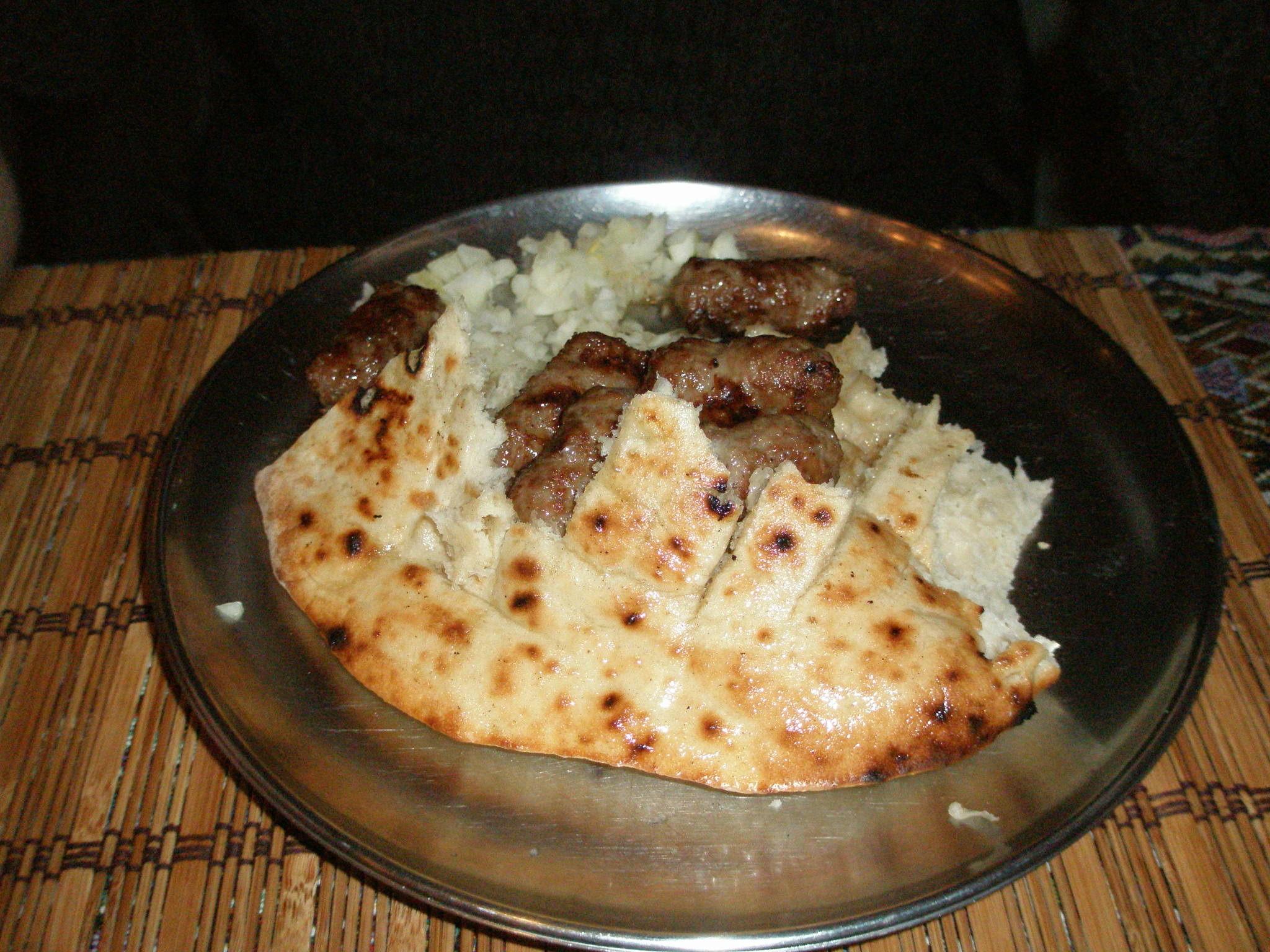
Bosnian ćevapi with onions in a somun

- Ćevapi – Bosnian kebabs: small grilled minced meat links made of lamb and beef mix; served with onions, kajmak, ajvar and Bosnian pita bread (somun)
- Pljeskavica – a patty dish
- Begova čorba (Bey's stew) – a popular Bosnian soup (chorba) made of meat and vegetables
- Punjena paprika – bell peppers stuffed with minced meat and rice cooked in a stew
- Sogan-dolma – onions stuffed with minced meat and herbs
- Ćufte – meatballs
- Meat under sač (meso ispod sača) – a traditional way of cooking lamb, veal, or goat under a metal, ceramic, or earthenware lid on which hot coals and ashes are heaped
- Pilav (tagliatelle) – a buttery tagliatelle
- Burek – a meat-filled flaky pastry, traditionally rolled in a spiral and cut into sections for serving. The same dish filled with cottage cheese is called sirnica; with spinach and cheese, zeljanica; with squash or zucchini, tikvenjača, and with potatoes, krompiruša. All these varieties are generically referred to as pita (Bosnian for "pie").
- Sarma – meat and rice rolled in pickled cabbage
- Grah or pasulj – a traditional bean stew with meat
- Bosanski lonac – Bosnian meat stew cooked over an open fire
- Tarhana – typical Bosnian soup with homemade pasta
- Sudžuk – spicy beef sausage
- Suho meso – air-dried meat similar to pastirma
- Gulaš — dish made of beef and vegetables seasoned with paprika

== Stews ==
- Đuveč – vegetable stew, similar to the Romanian ghiveci and Bulgarian gjuvec
- Kačamak – a traditional Bosnian dish made of cornmeal and potatoes
- Kljukuša – grated potatoes mixed with flour and water and baked in an oven; a traditional dish in the region of Bosanska Krajina
- Sataraš – a dish made with bell peppers, eggplants, onions and tomatoes
- Begova čorba

== Appetizers ==
- Meze – an assortment of meats, vegetables, or other small dishes served before a meal

== Cheeses ==
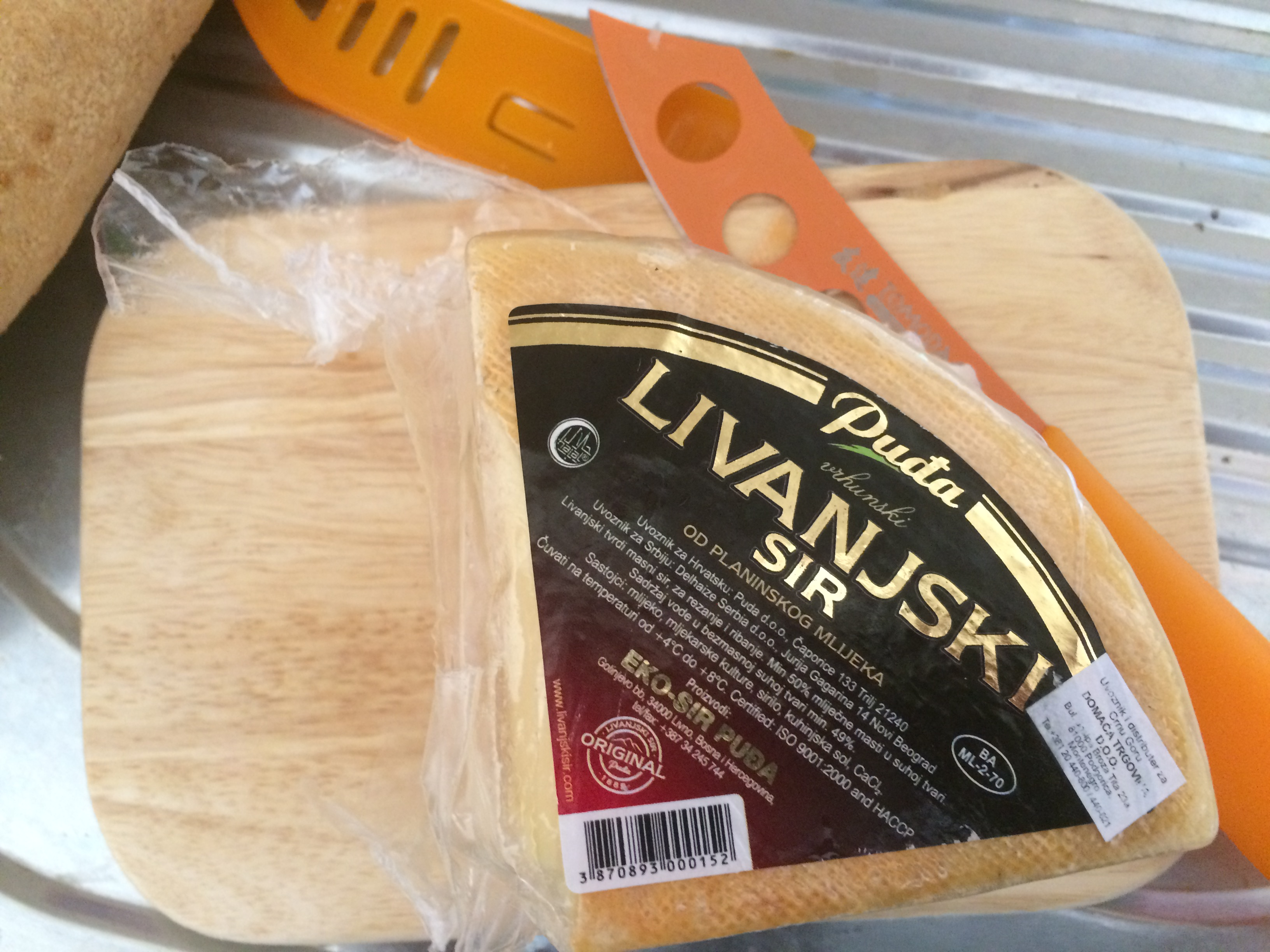
Cheese from Livno

- Livno cheese – a dry yellow cheese from the west Bosnian town of Livno and surrounding villages
- Vlašić cheese – a highland cheese similar in its salty taste to Travnički, originates in the villages on Vlašić Mountain in central Bosnia and Herzegovina
- Bosnian smoked cheese – a dry piquant low-fat smoked cheese
- Kajmak – a creamy dairy product, similar to clotted cream
- Pavlaka – a soured cream product like crème fraîche
- Cheese in sack - cheese aged in a sheep’s skin made usually in the region of Hercegovina

== Desserts ==
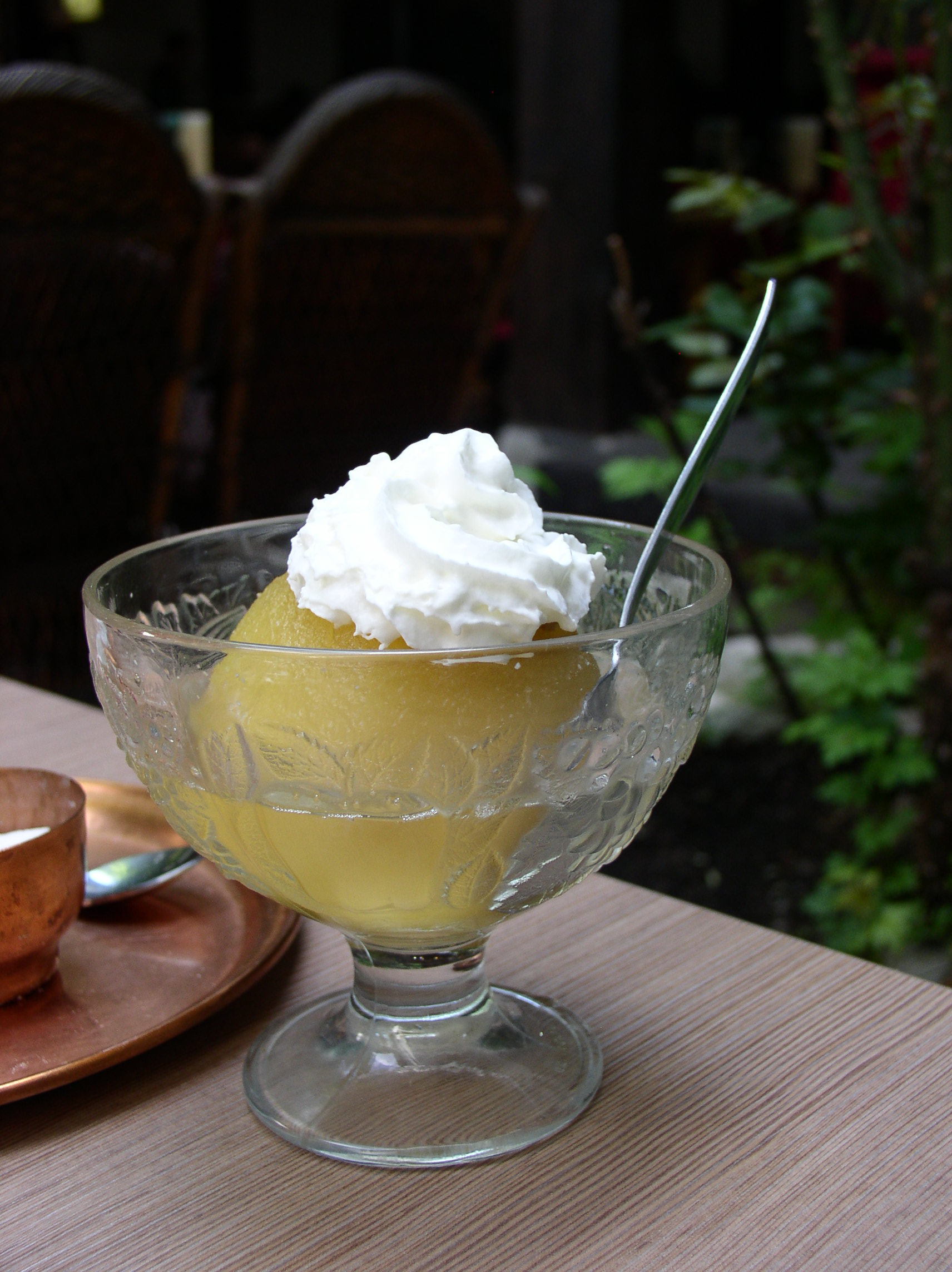
Tufahija

- Baklava
- Halva
- Hurmašica – date-shaped pastry drenched in a sweet syrup
- Jabukovača – pastry made of filo dough stuffed with apples
- Kadaif
- Krofna – filled doughnut
- Krempita
- Oblanda, wafer with walnut filling
- Palačinka (crêpe)
- Pekmez
- Rahatlokum (Turkish delight)
- Ružica – similar to baklava, but baked in a small roll with raisins
- Ruske Kape (trans. Russian Caps, plural)
- Šampita – a whipped marshmallow-type dessert with fillo dough crust
- Sutlijaš, rice pudding
- Tufahija – whole stewed apple stuffed with a walnut filling
- Tulumba – deep-fried dough sweetened with syrup

== Relishes, seasoning and bread ==
- Ajvar
- Pindjur
- Vegeta
- Somun and Ramadan somun (with Ćurokot seeds).
- Pogača
- Djevrek
- Lepinja
- Uštipci

== Alcoholic beverages ==
Wines are produced mainly in Herzegovina, in the regions of Mostar, Čitluk, Ljubuški, Stolac, Domanovići, and Međugorje.

- Pelinkovac
- Rakija
- Blatina
- Žilavka
- Local spirits are distilled from plums, pears, or grapes, with alcohol content of 45% and higher.
- Šljivovica (plum brandy)

== Non-alcoholic beverages ==
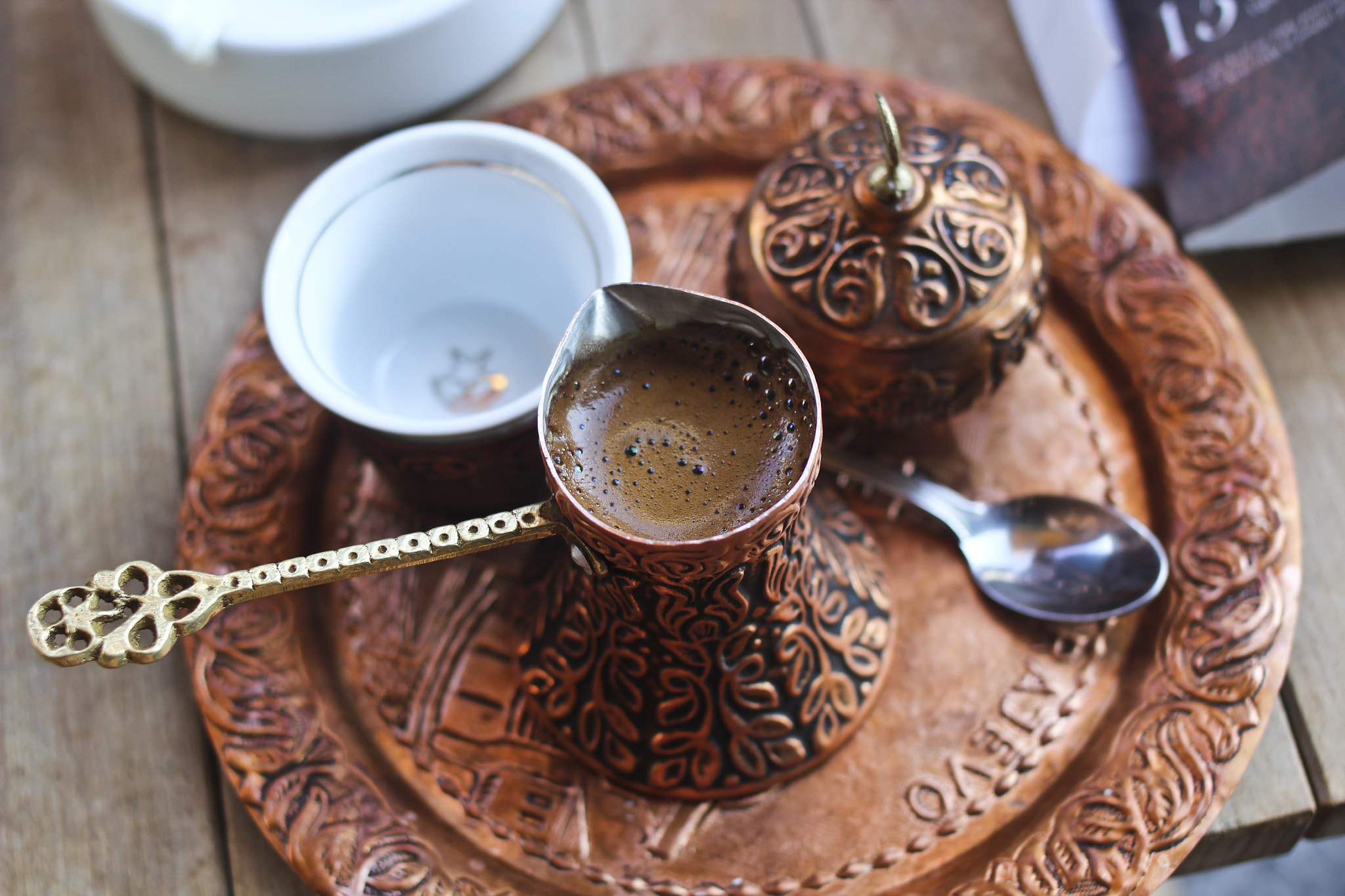
Bosnian coffee

- Ayran
- Kefir
- Bosnian coffee
- Šerbe
- Zova (Elderflower juice )
- Smreka - fermented Juniper berry juice

== Kitchenware ==
- Sač

== Gallery ==
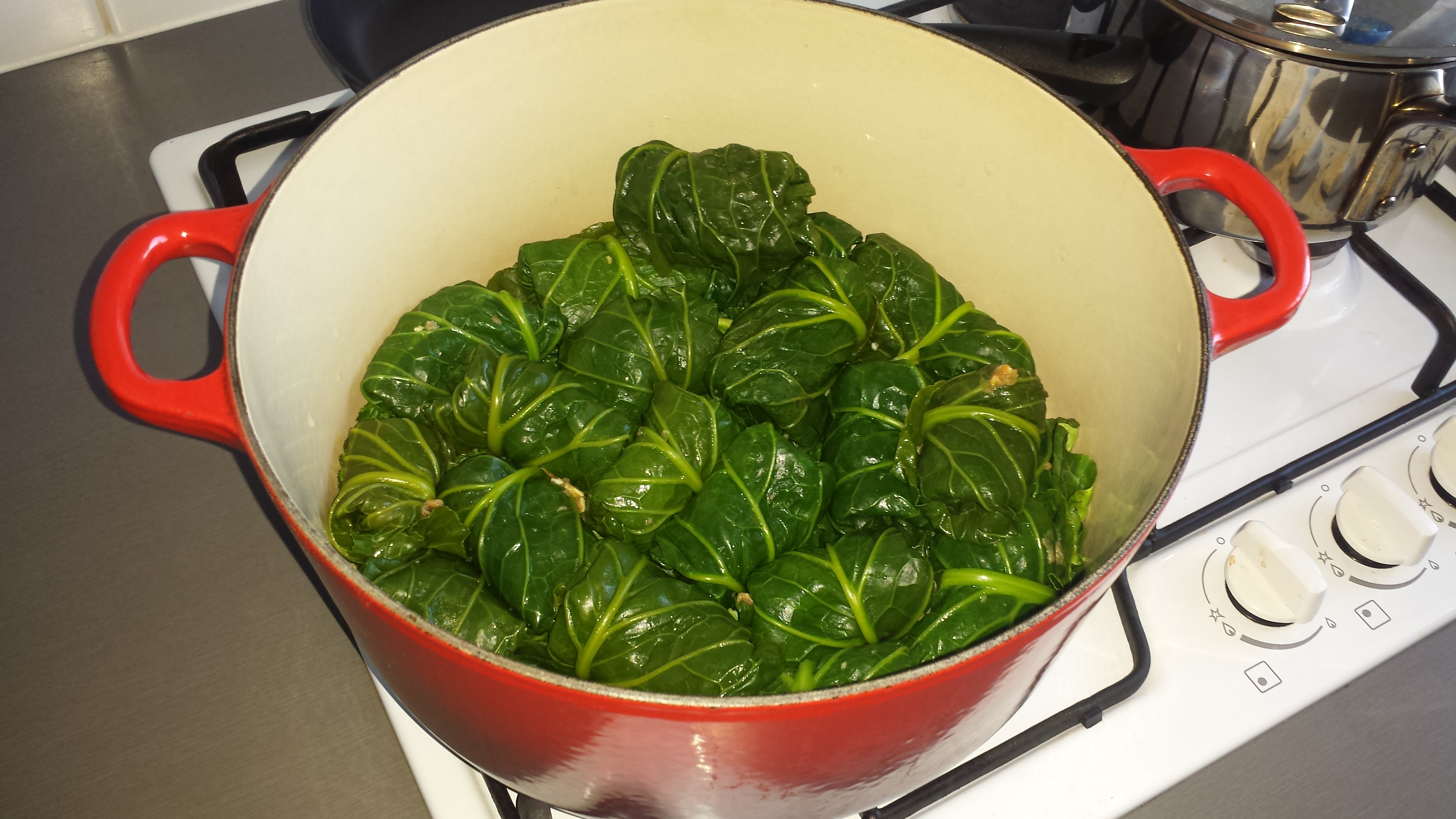
Stuffed collard greens

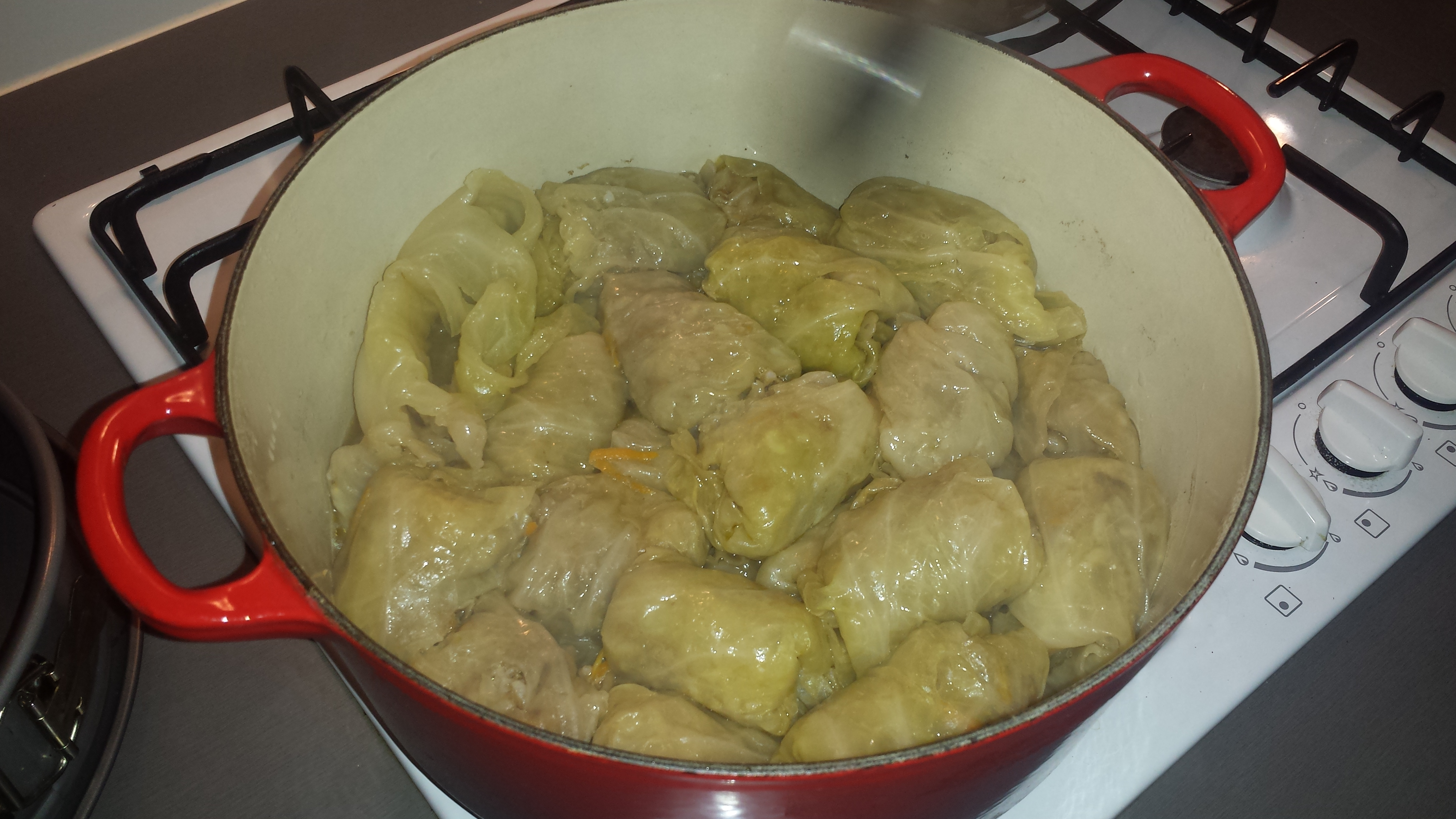
Sarma

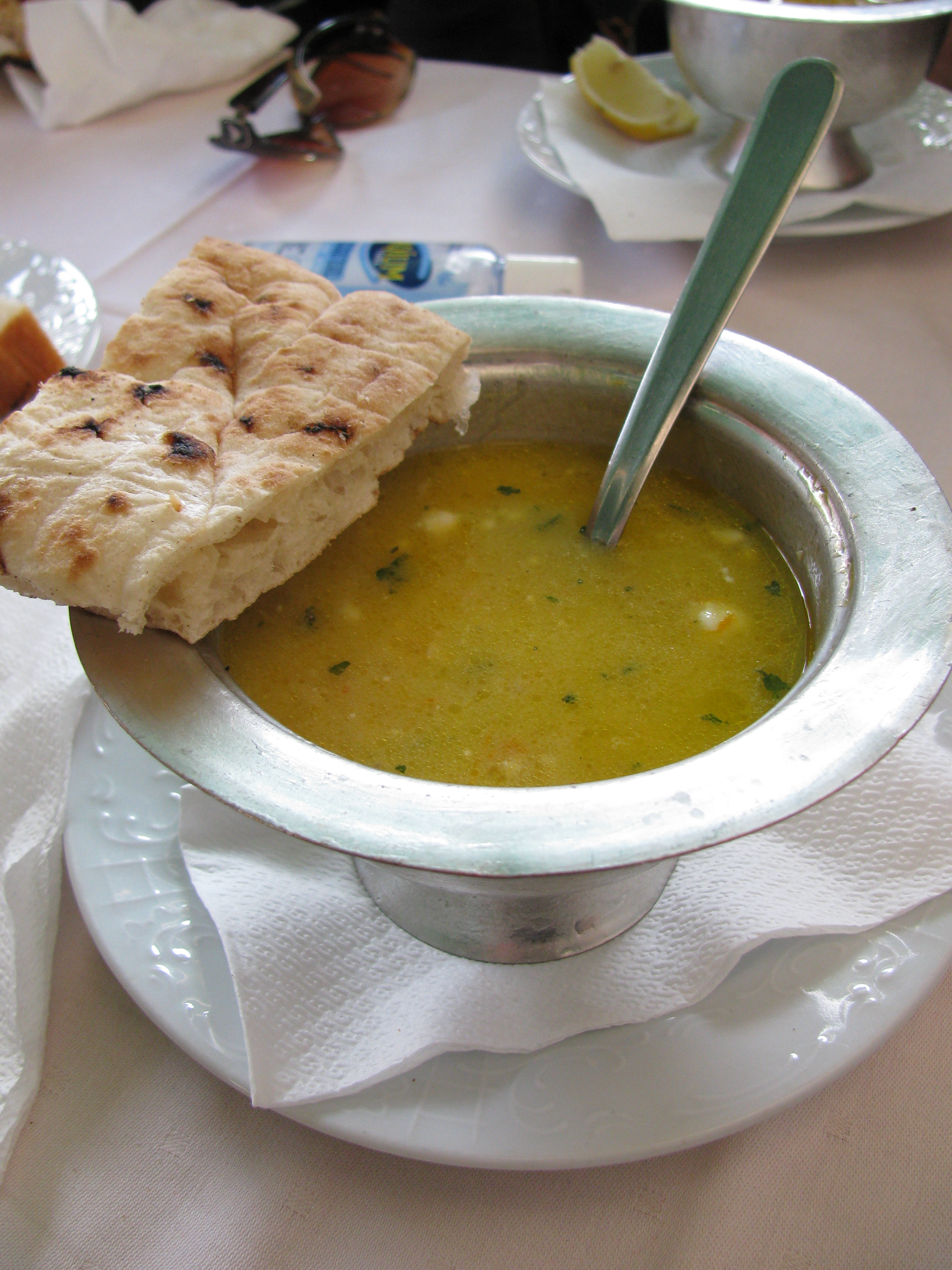
Begova Čorba at Baščaršija

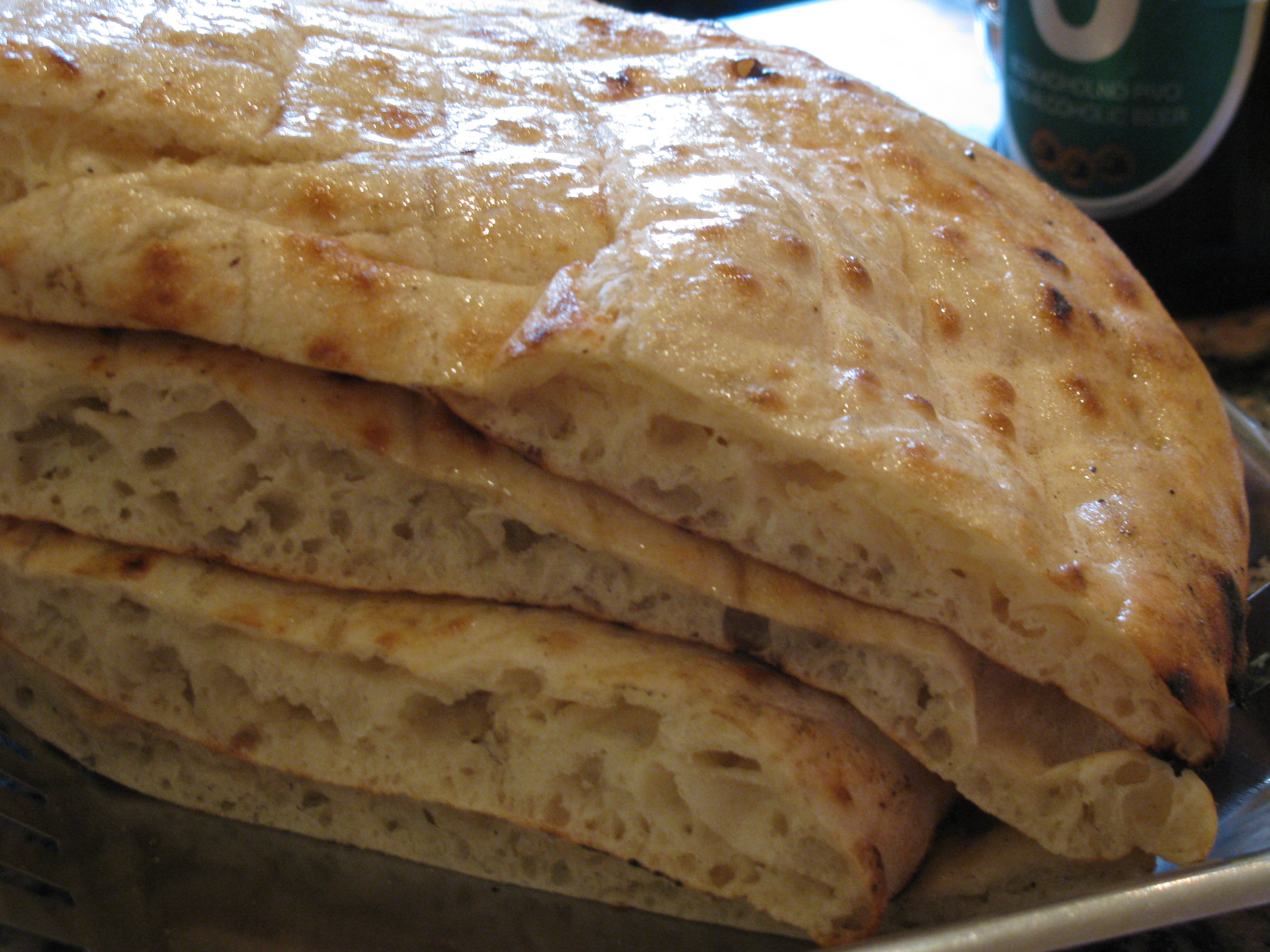
Sarajevski somun

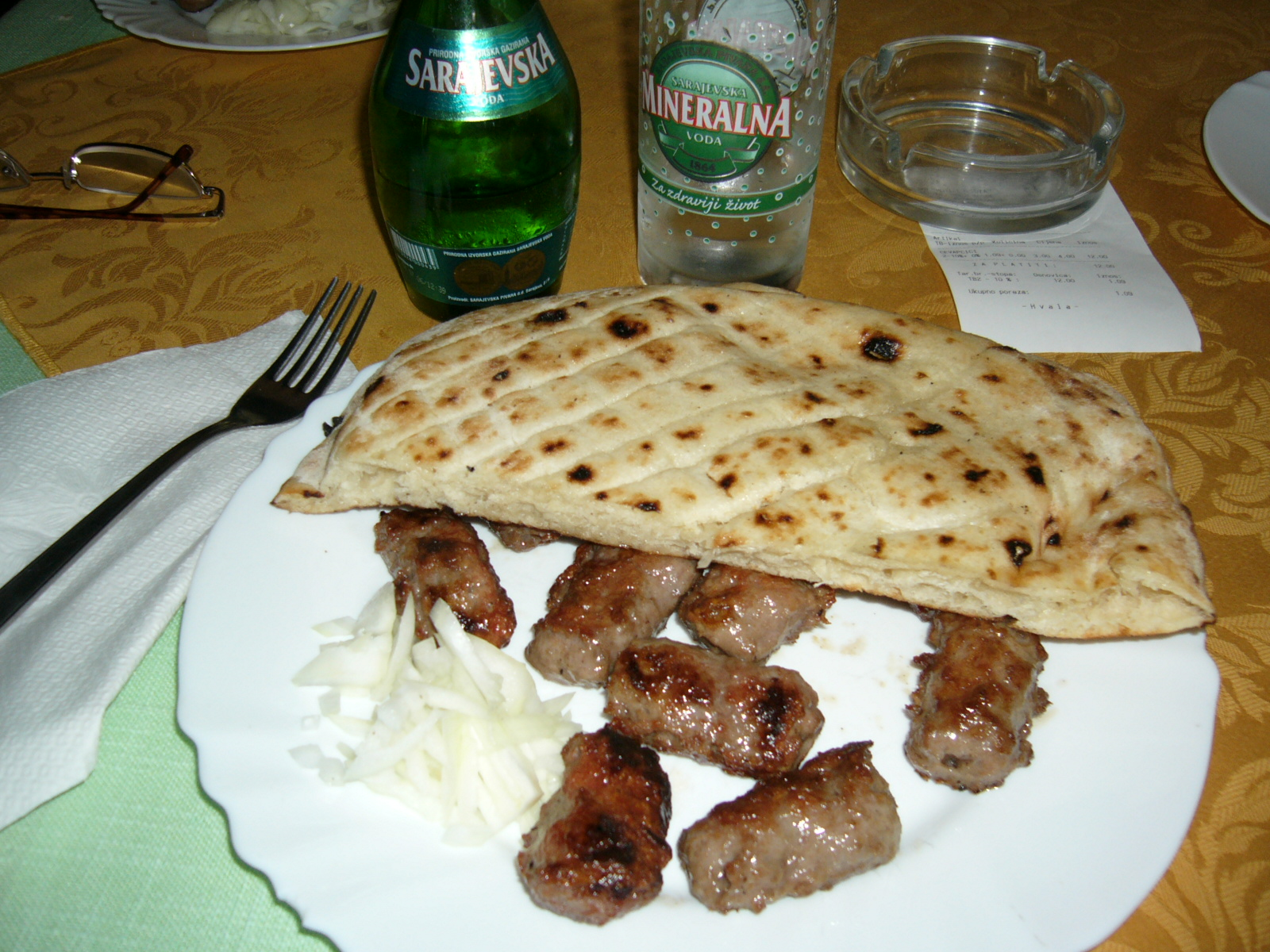
Sarajevo Ćevapi

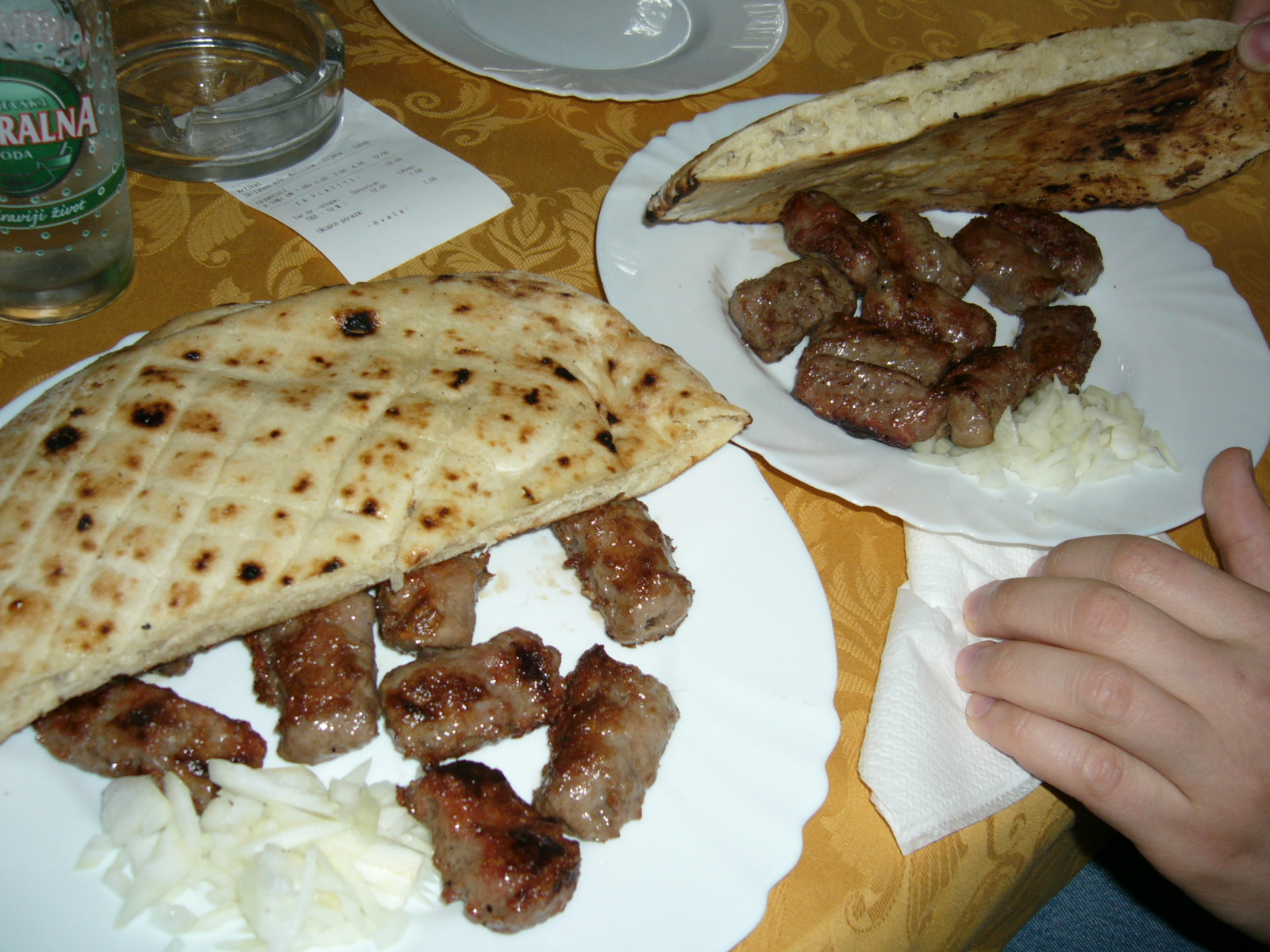
Sarajevo Ćevapi

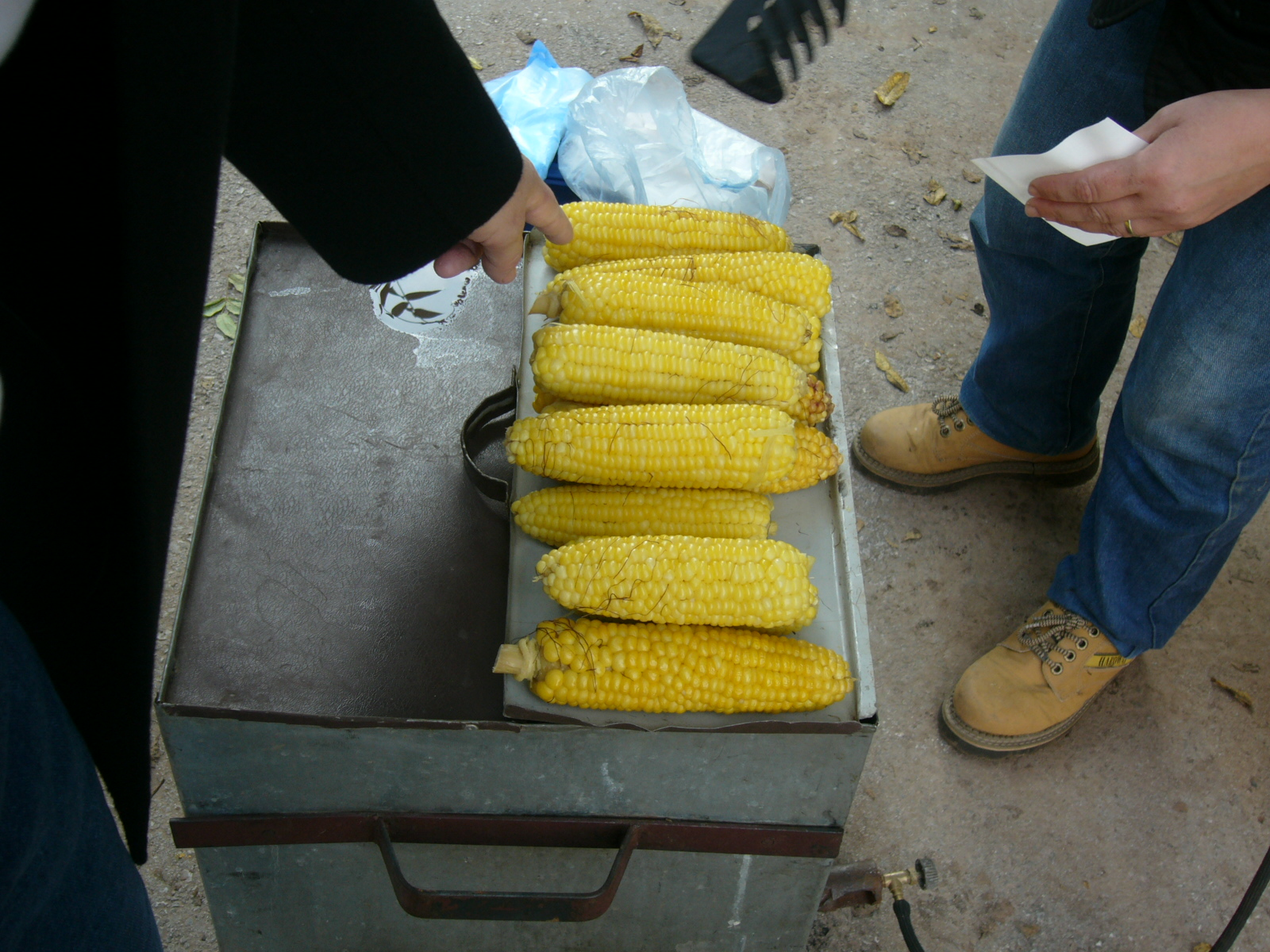
Cooked corn

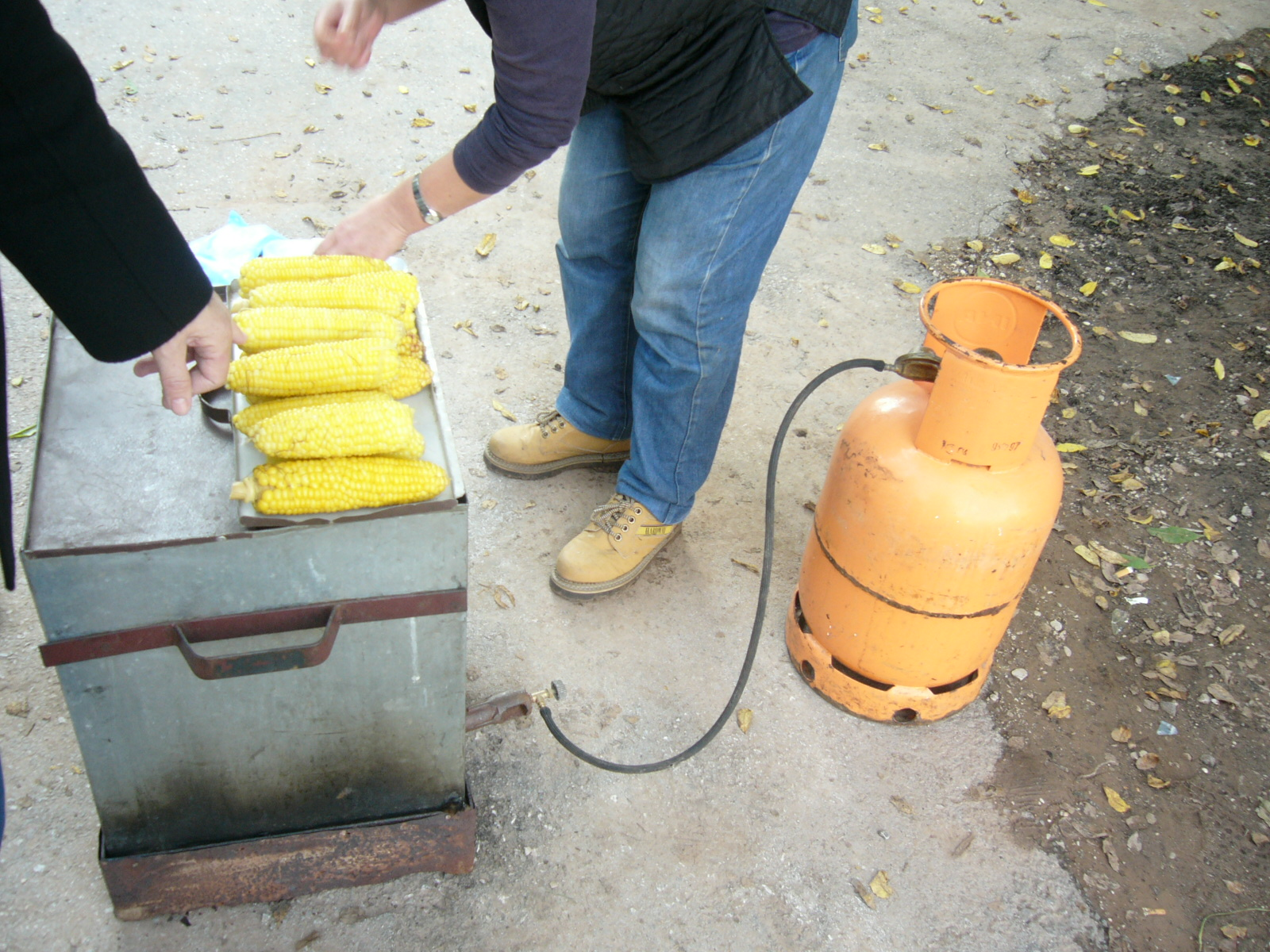
Cooked corn

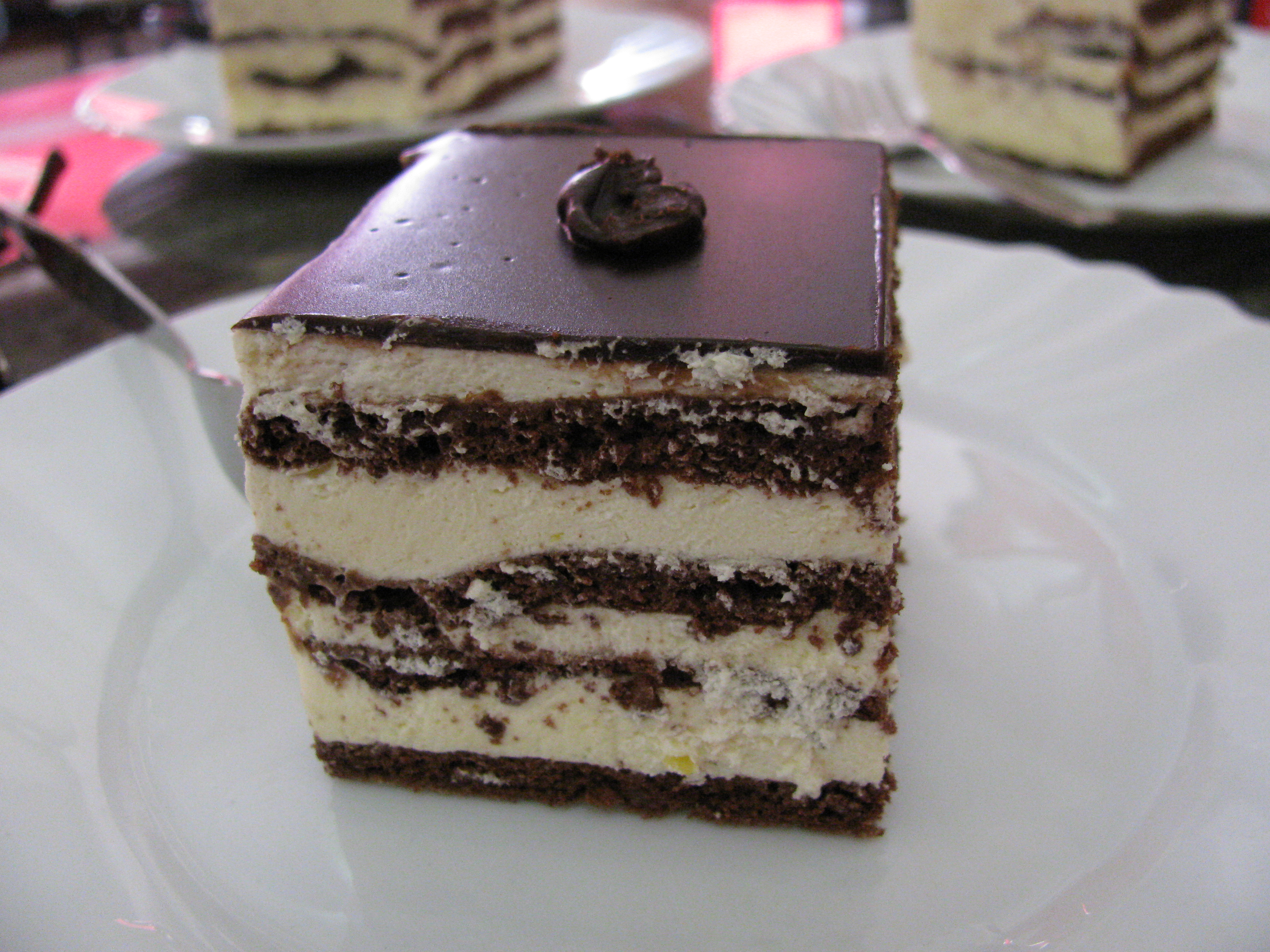
Boem šnita

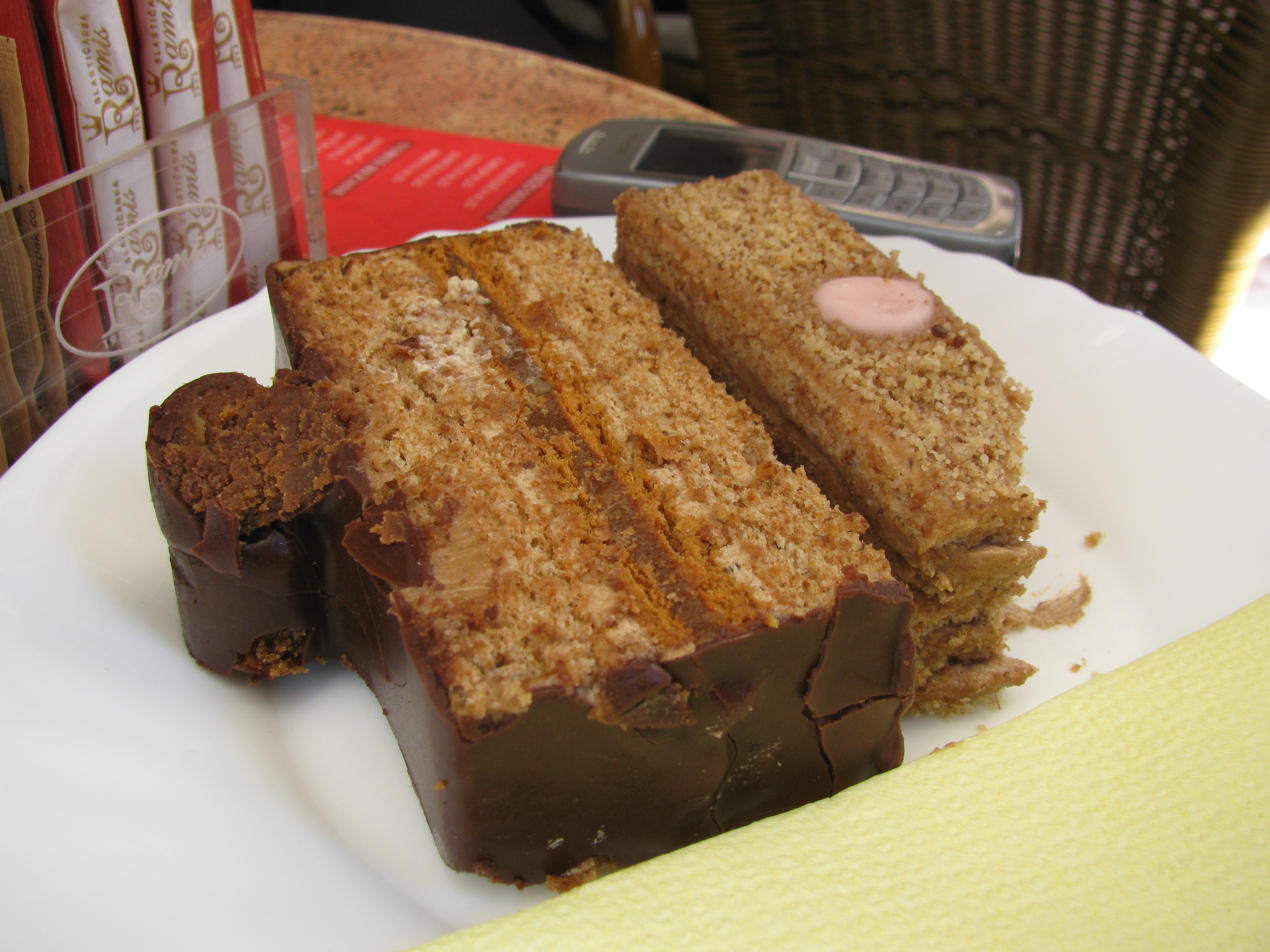
Bosanska Šnita

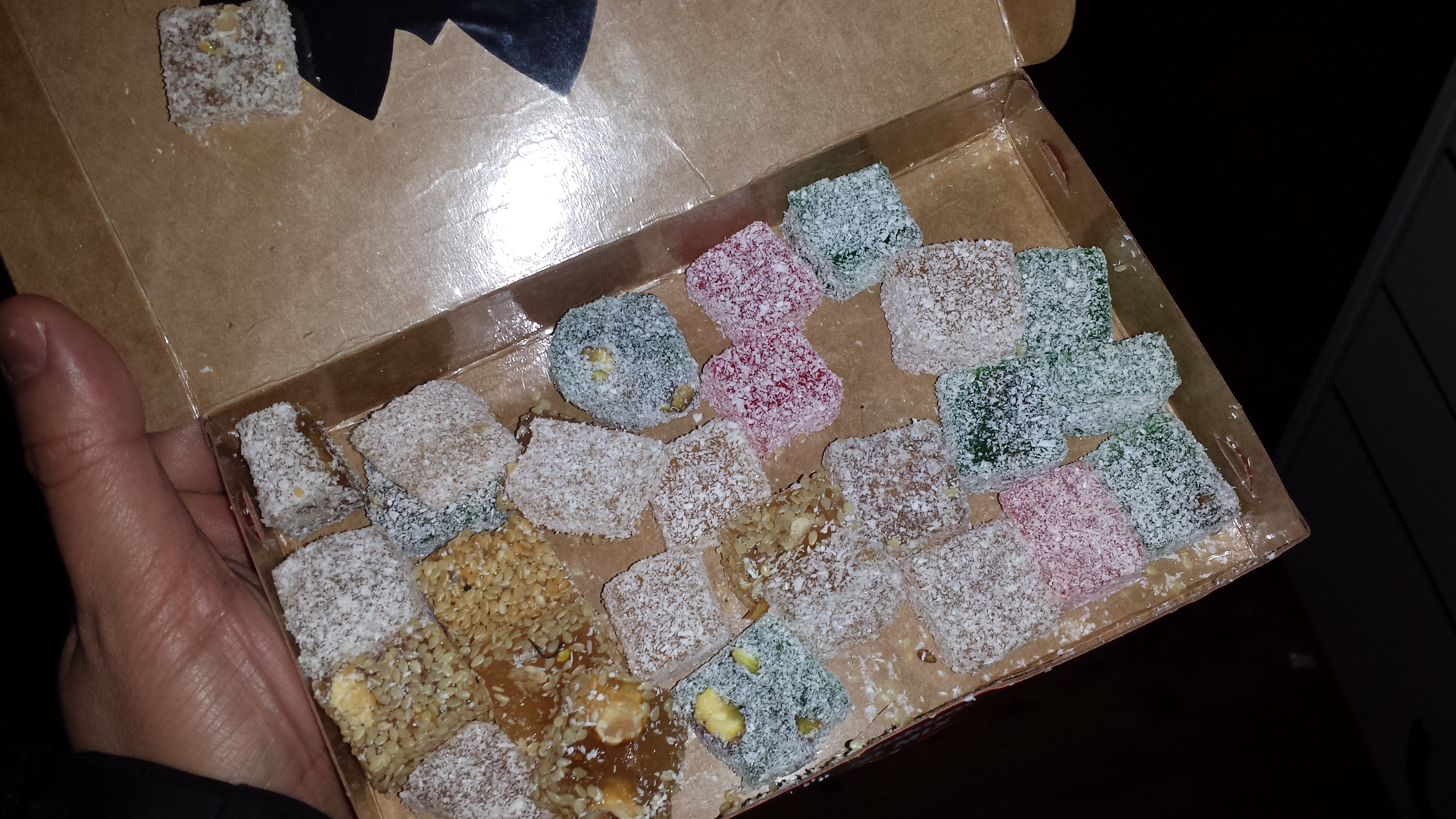
Sarajevski rahatlokum (Fruit mix)

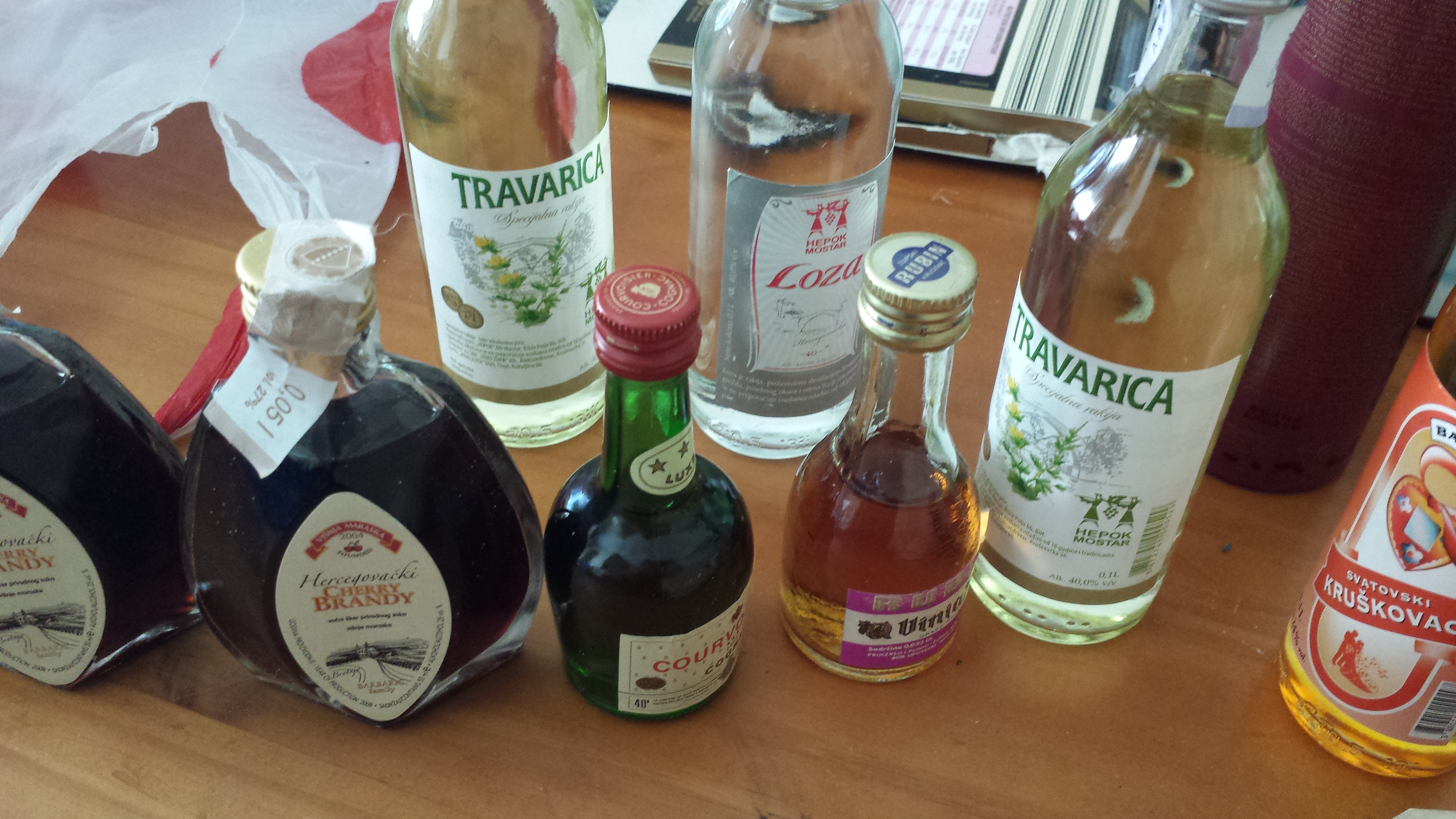
Bosnian alcoholic beverages

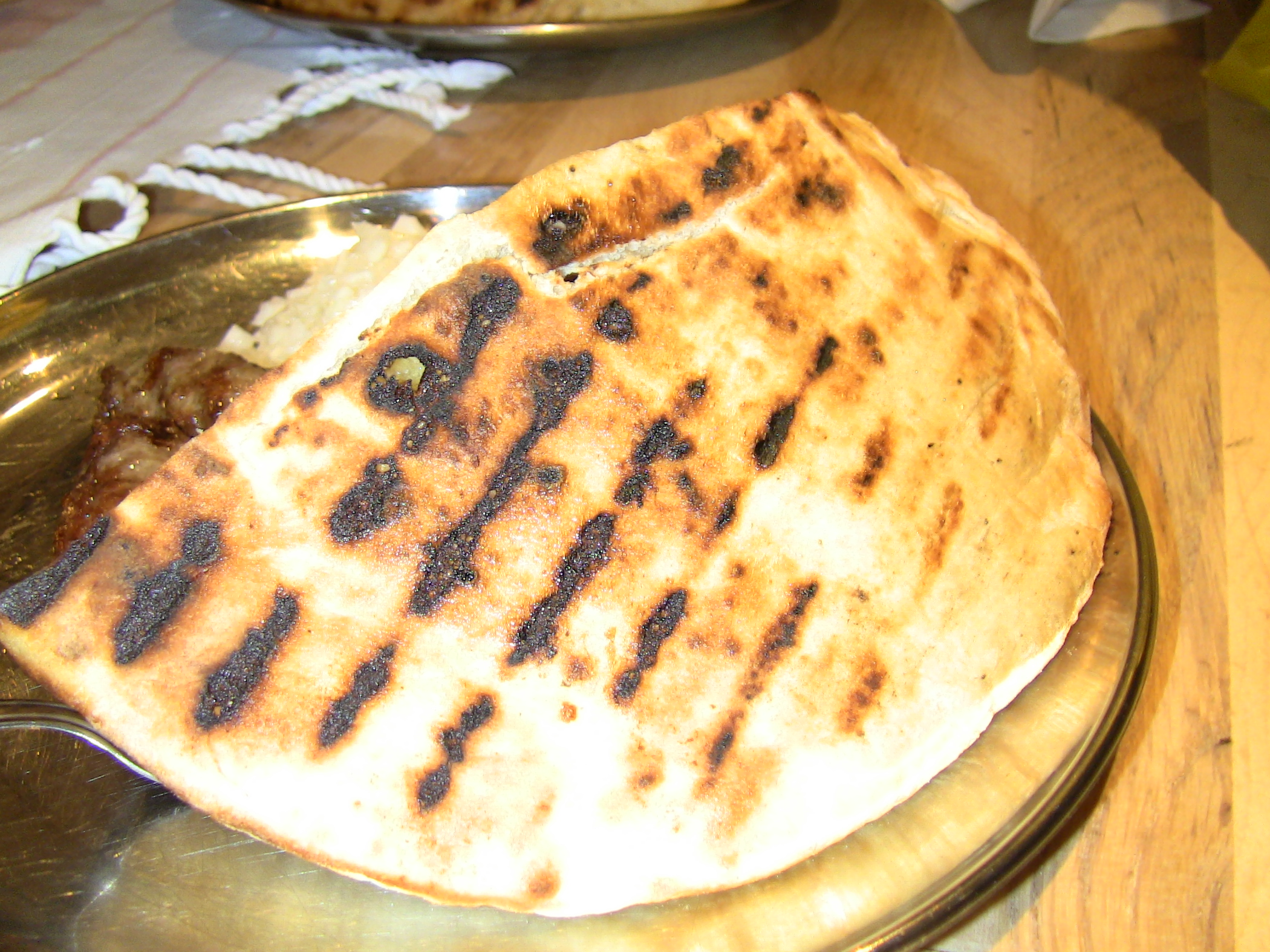
Somun bread (Sarajevski Ćevapi)

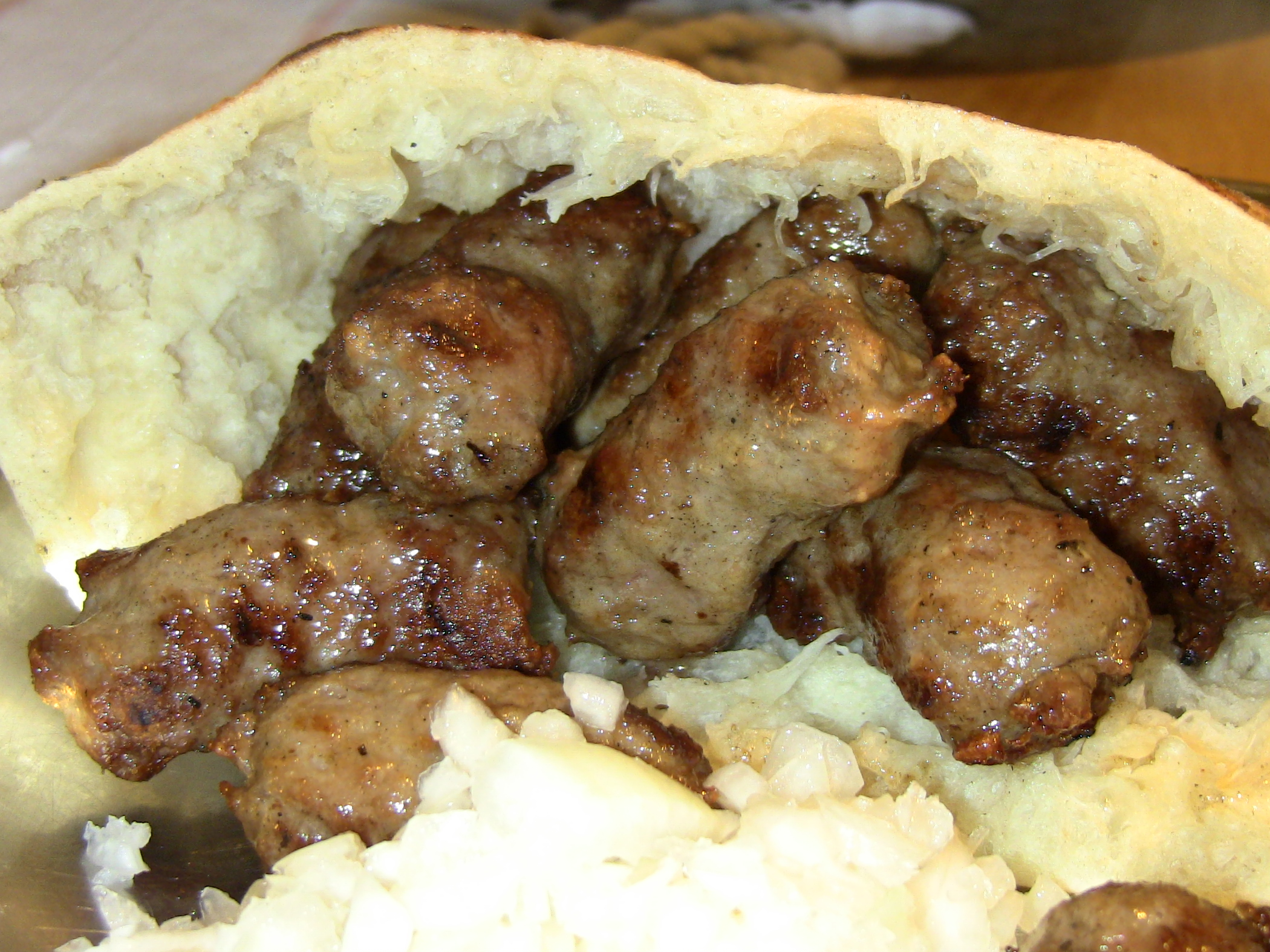
Bosnian Ćevapi (Sarajevo)

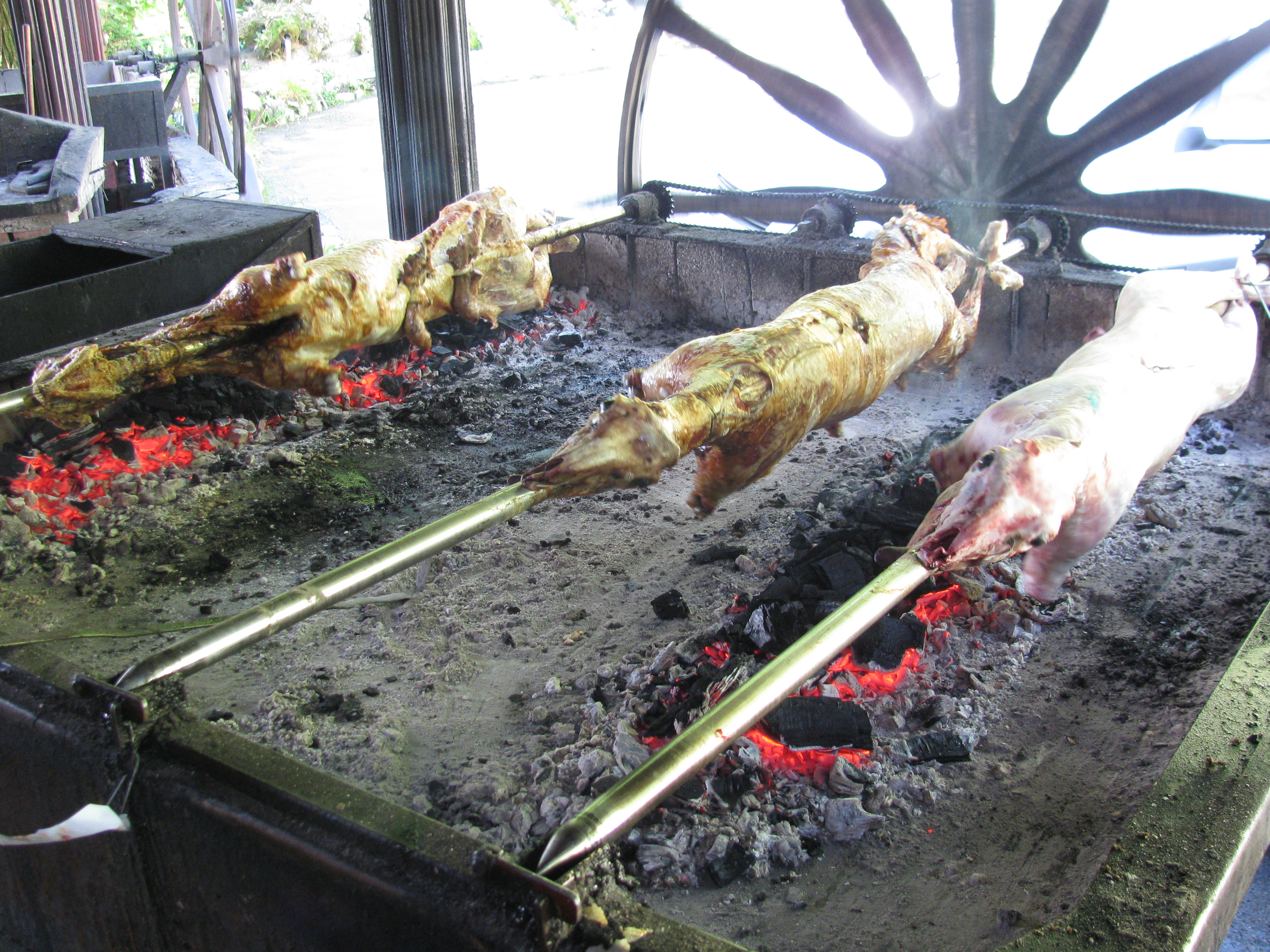
Lamb on the spit Jablanica

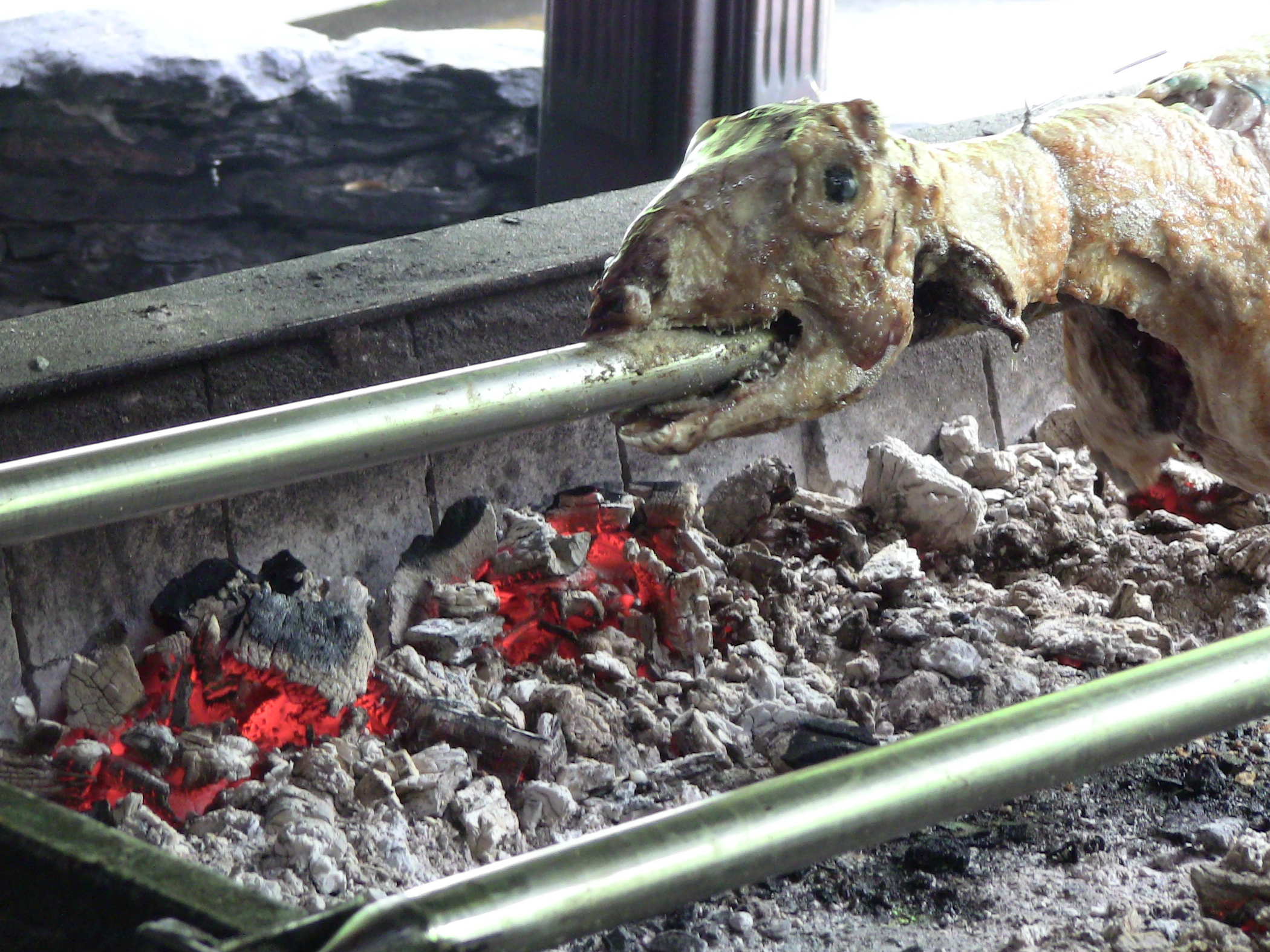
Lamb on the spit (Jablanica)

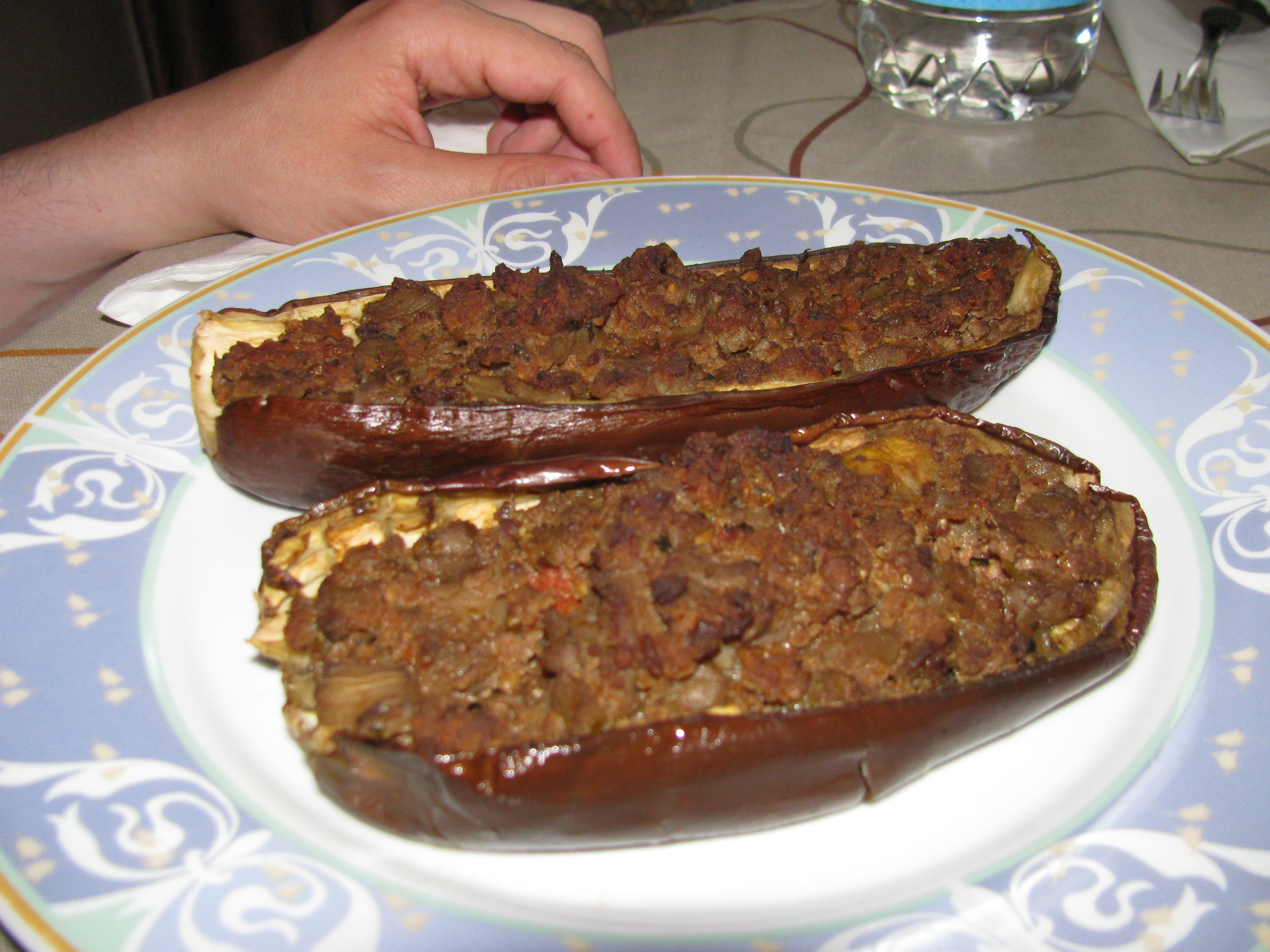
Stuffed eggplant (Punjeni patlidžan)

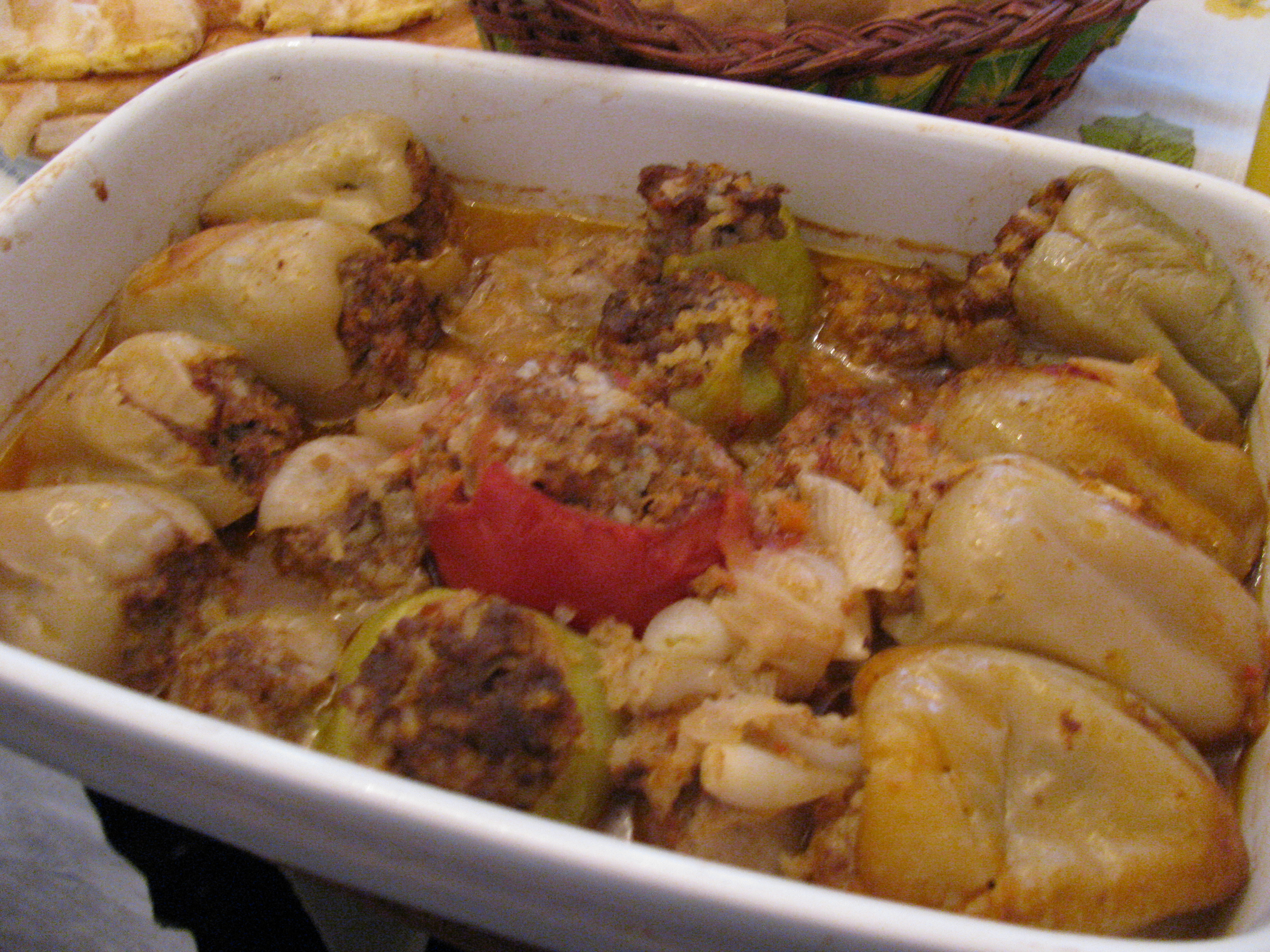
Stuffed peppers

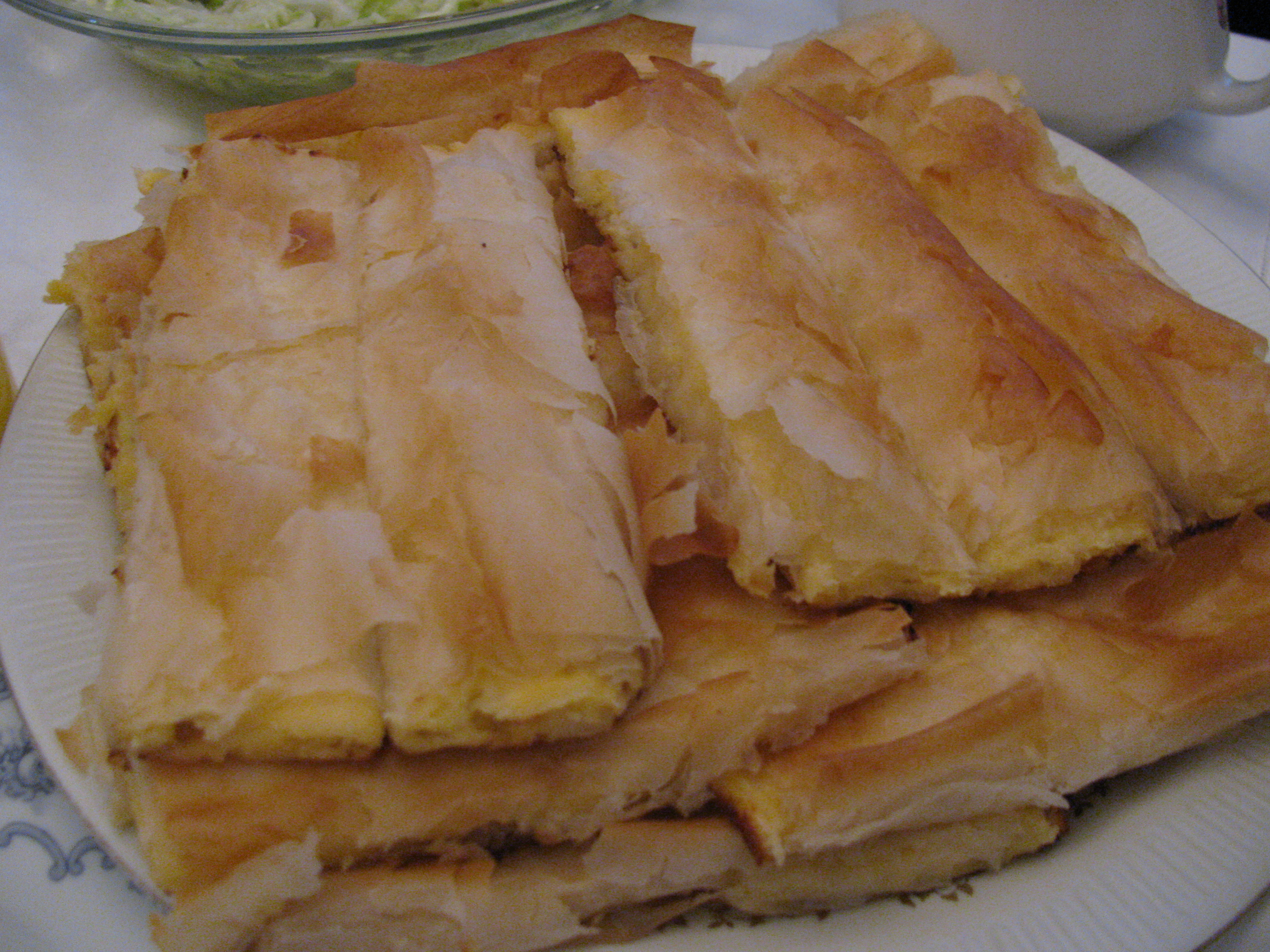
Cheese pie or cheese burek

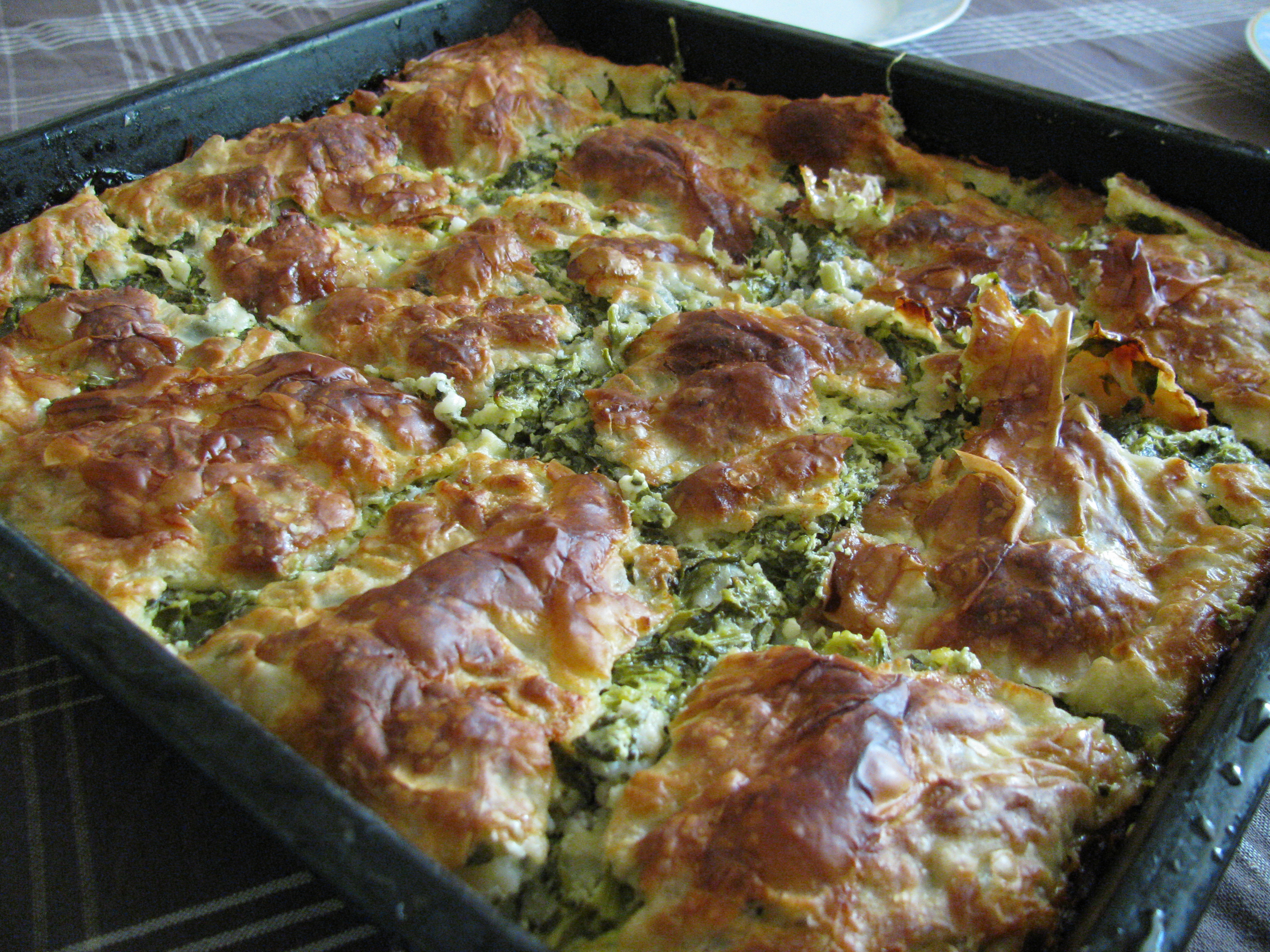
Spinach pie

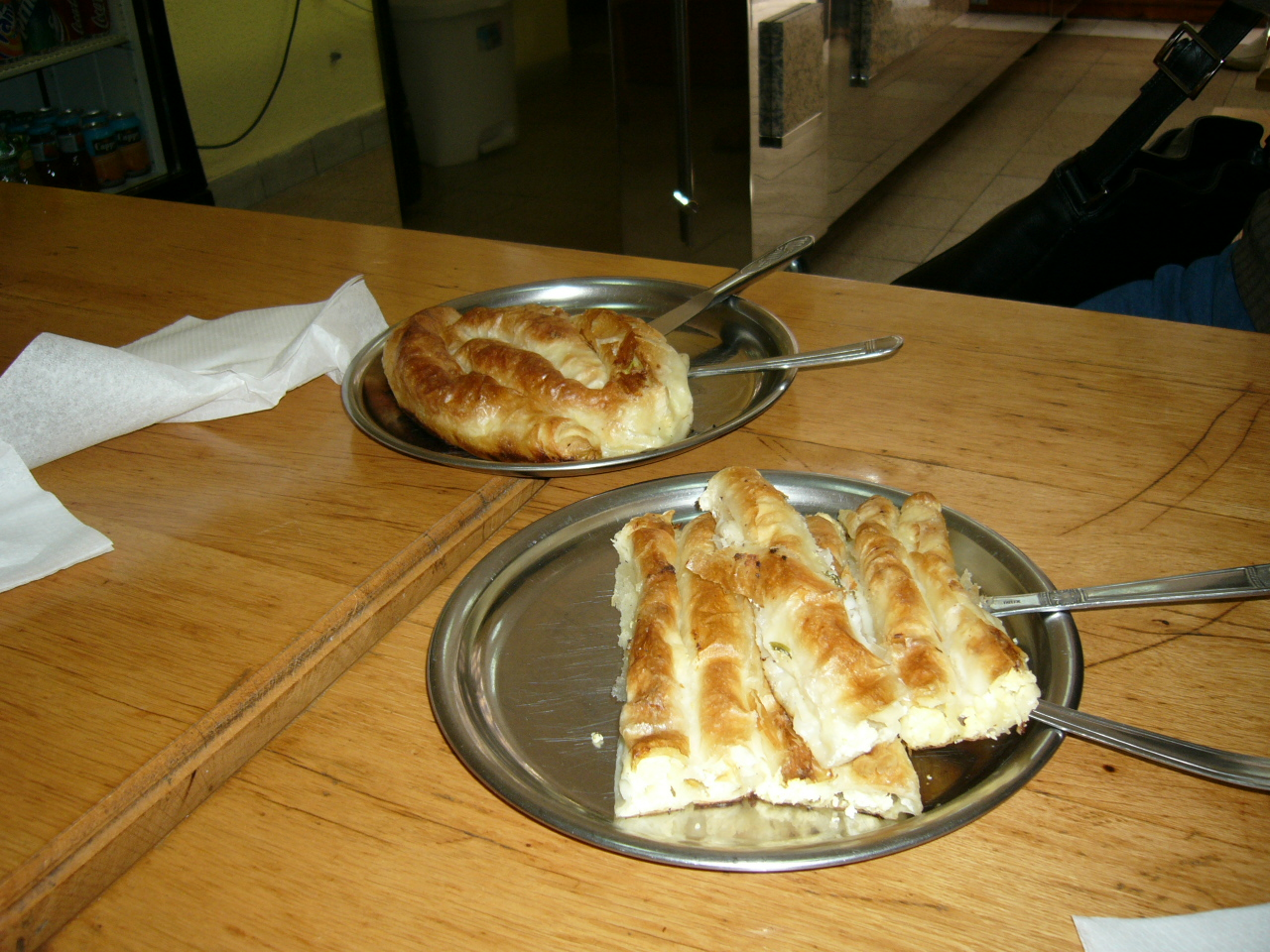
Bosnian pies in the shape of a wheel and strips

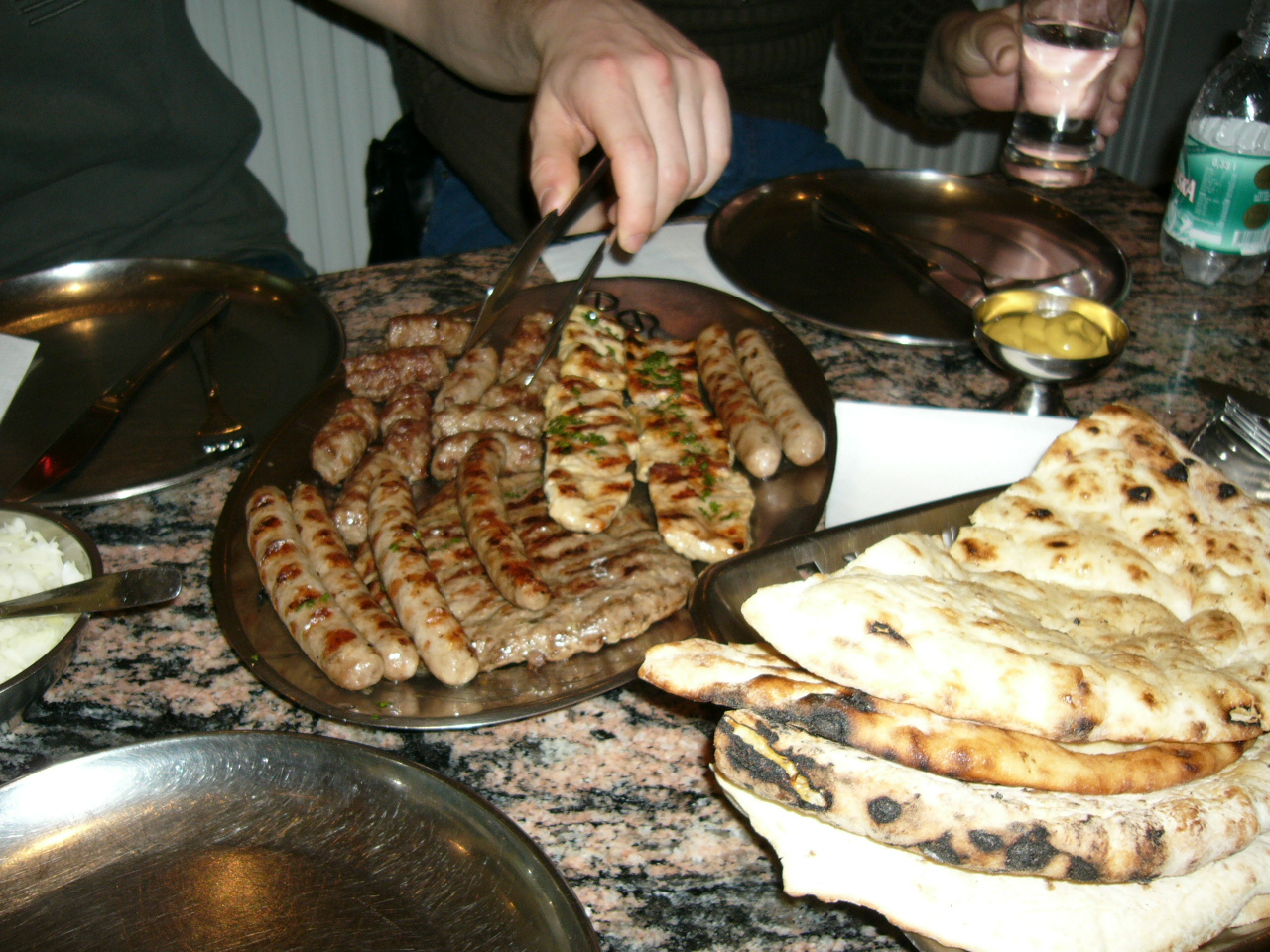
Bosnian meat platters

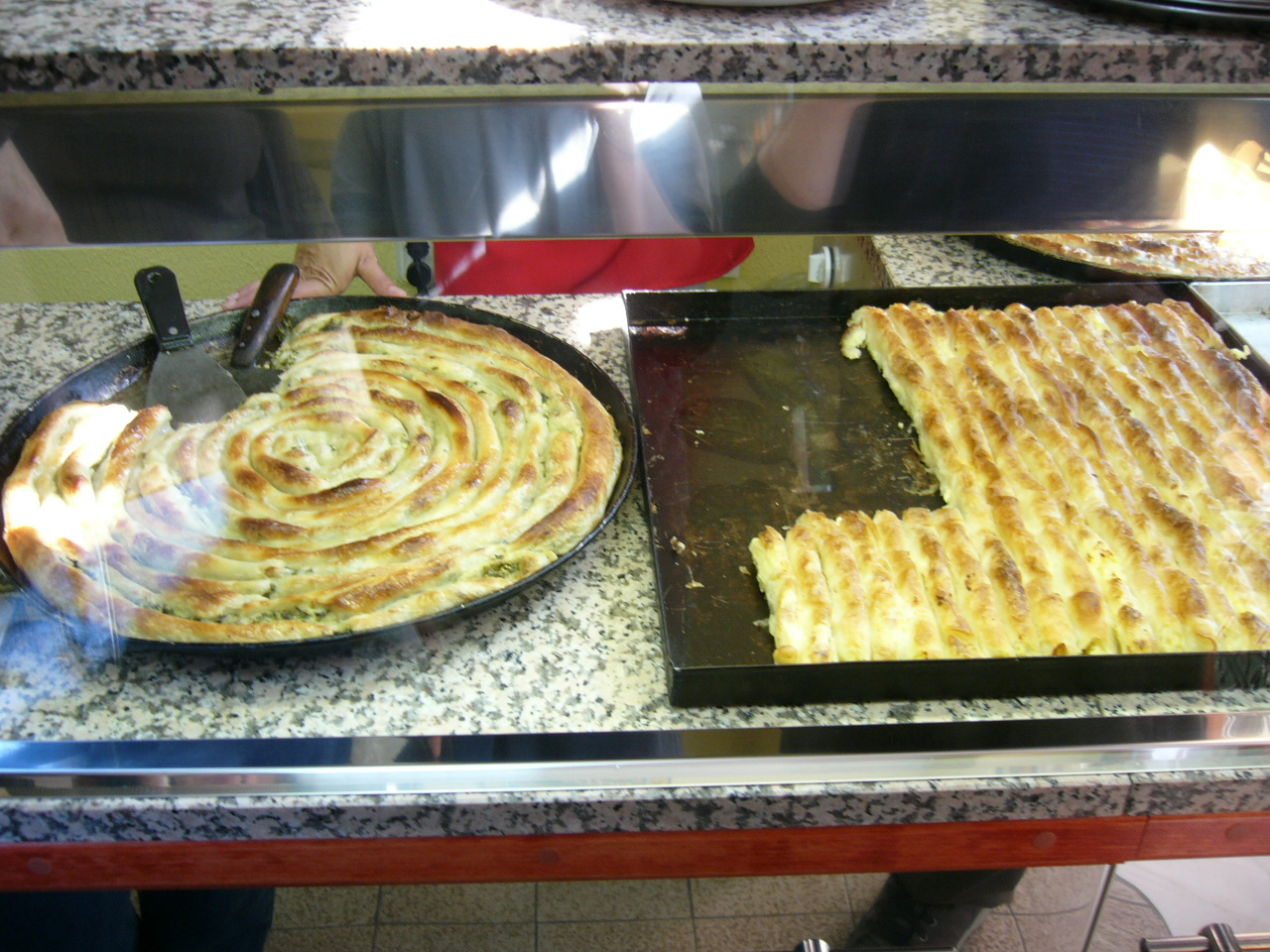
Spinach pie and cheese pie

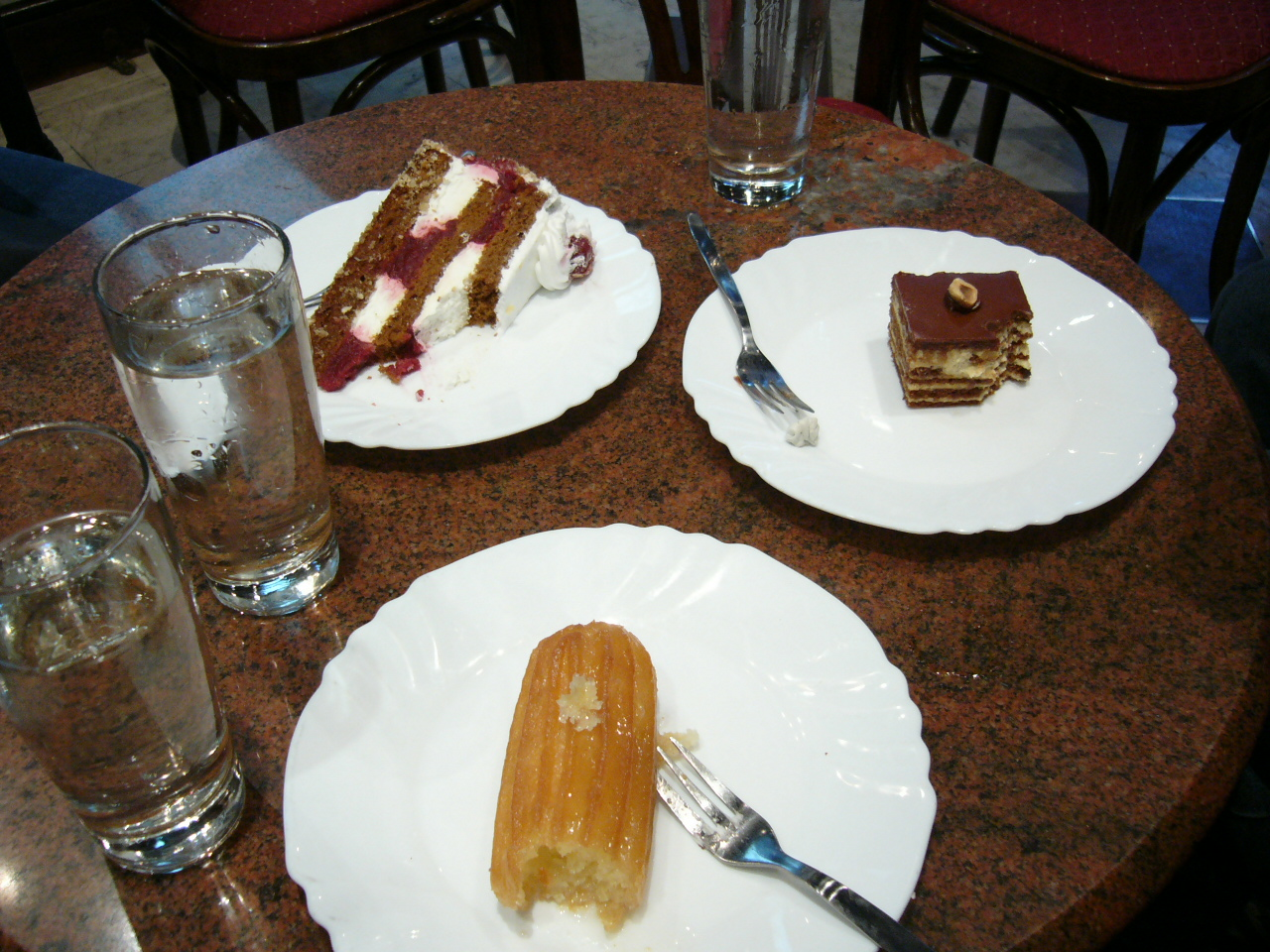
Tulumba (cross section)

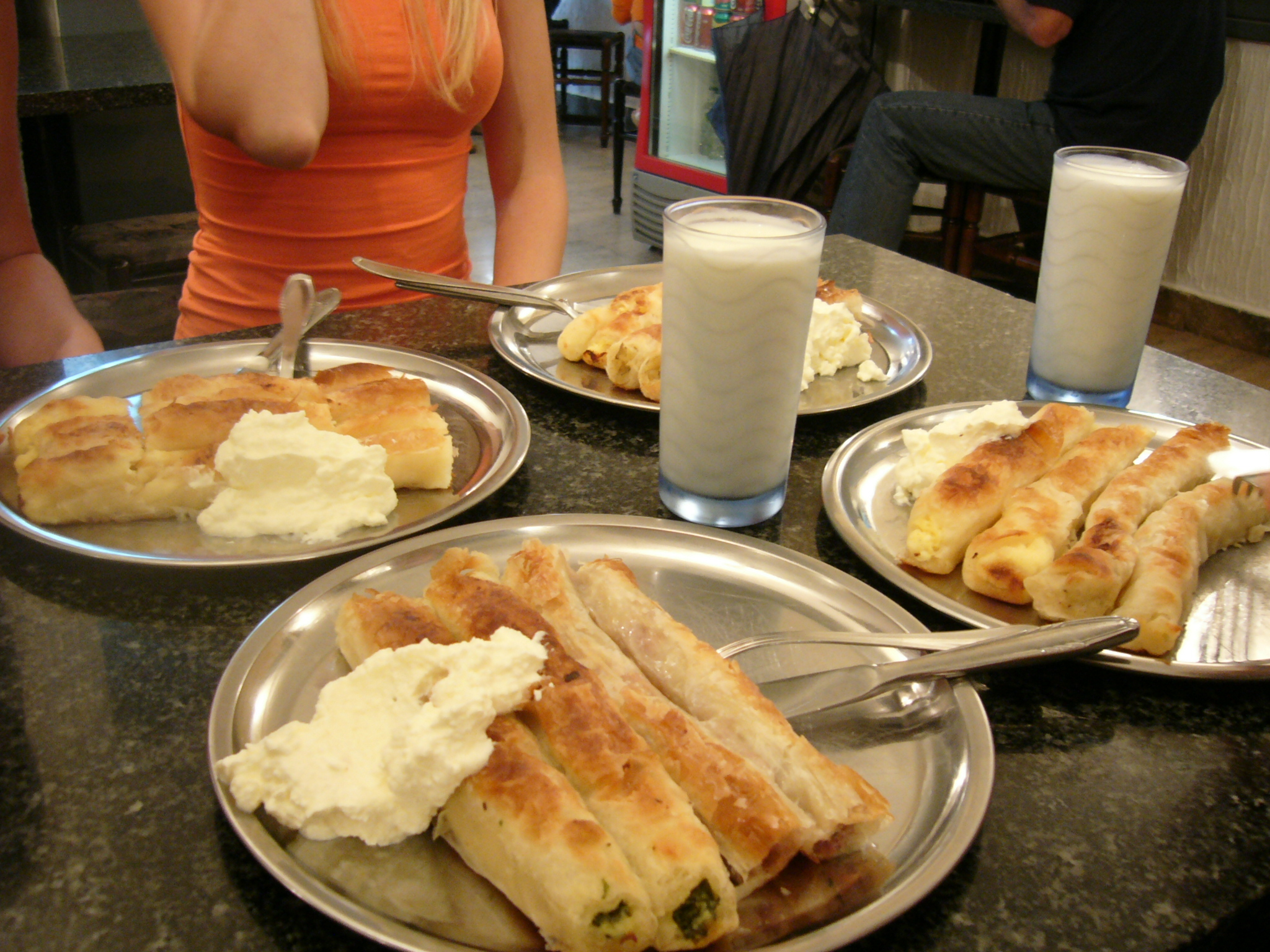
Bosnian pies

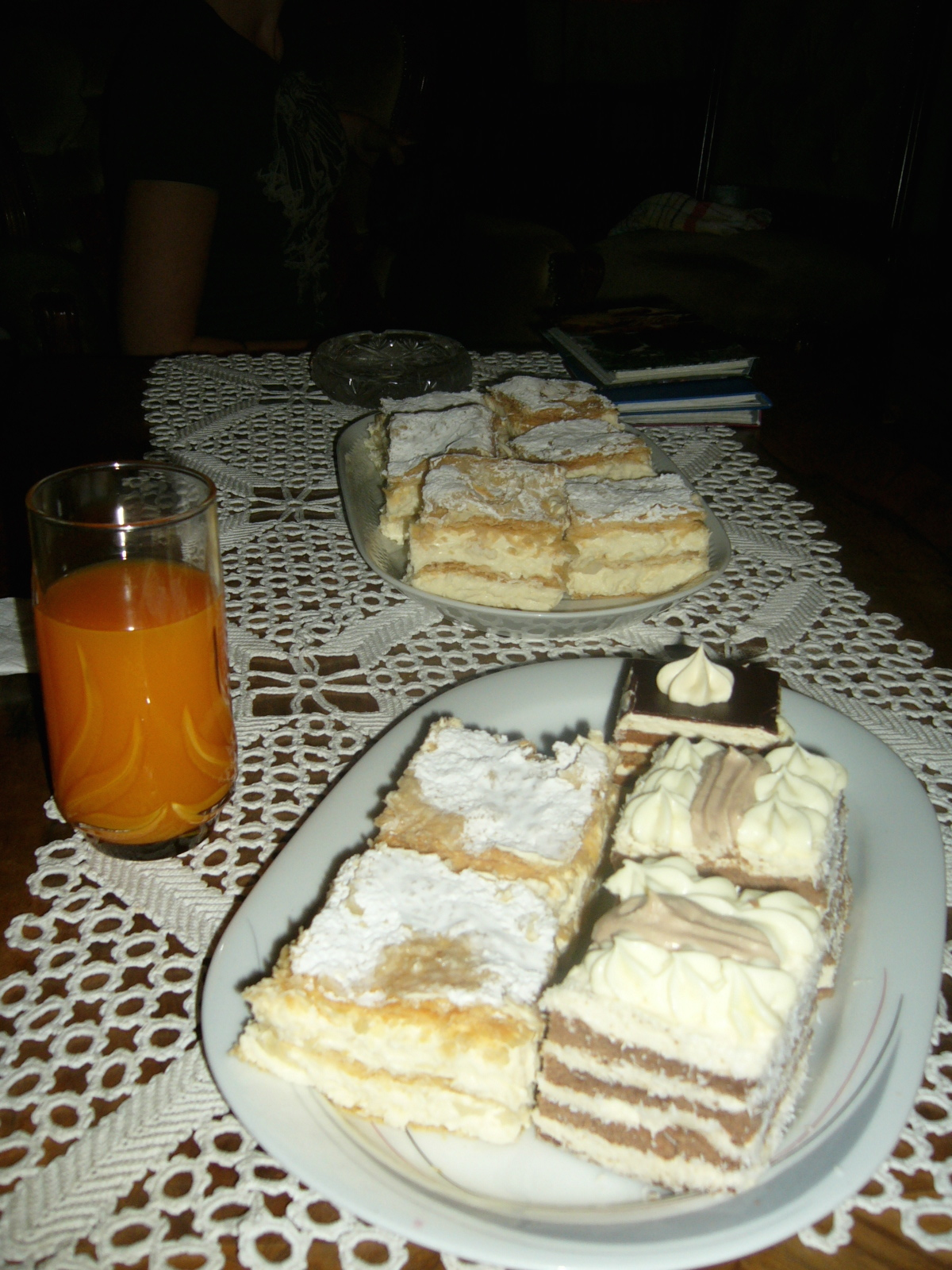
Cream pie

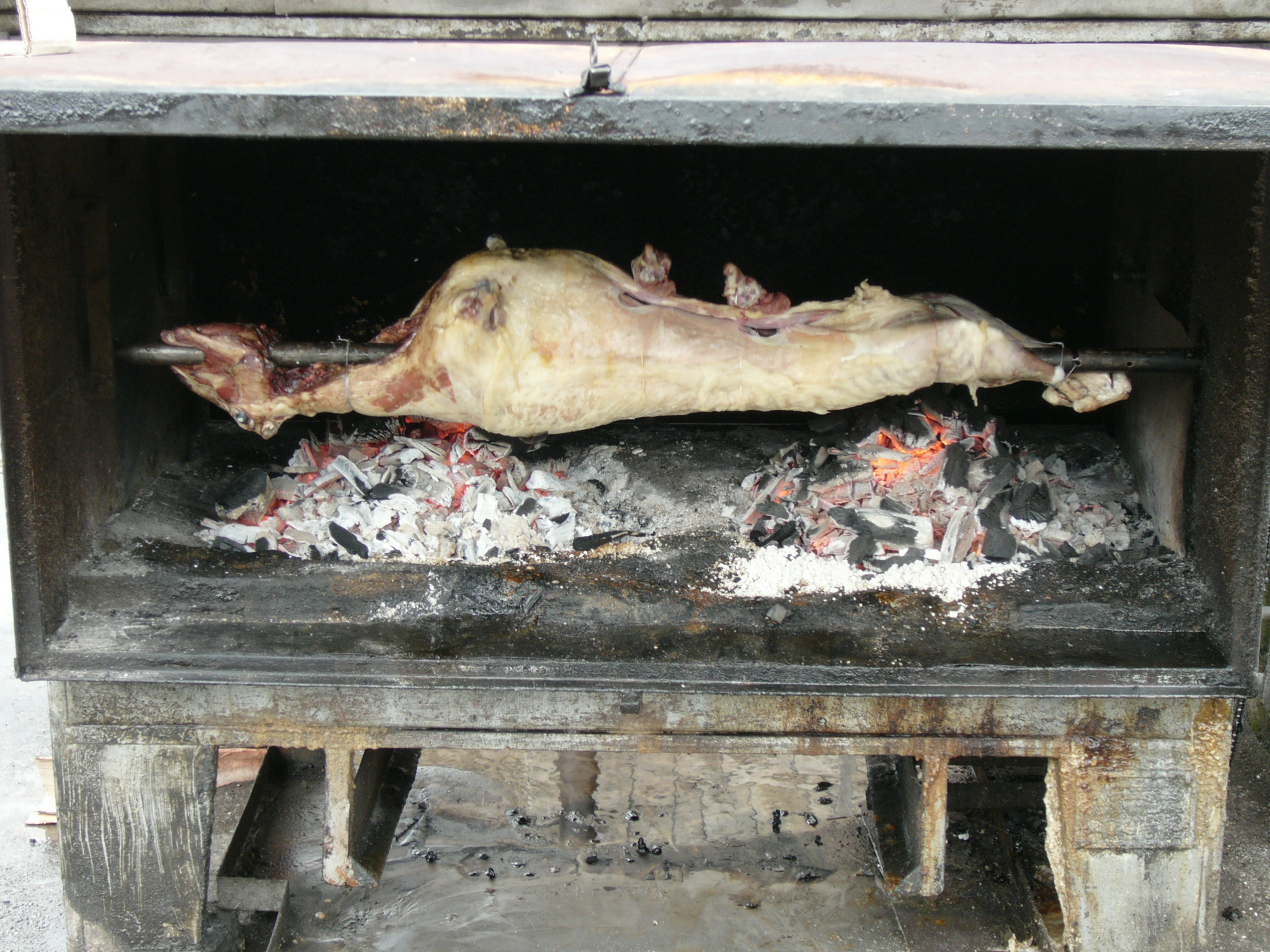
Lamb on the spit in Sarajevo

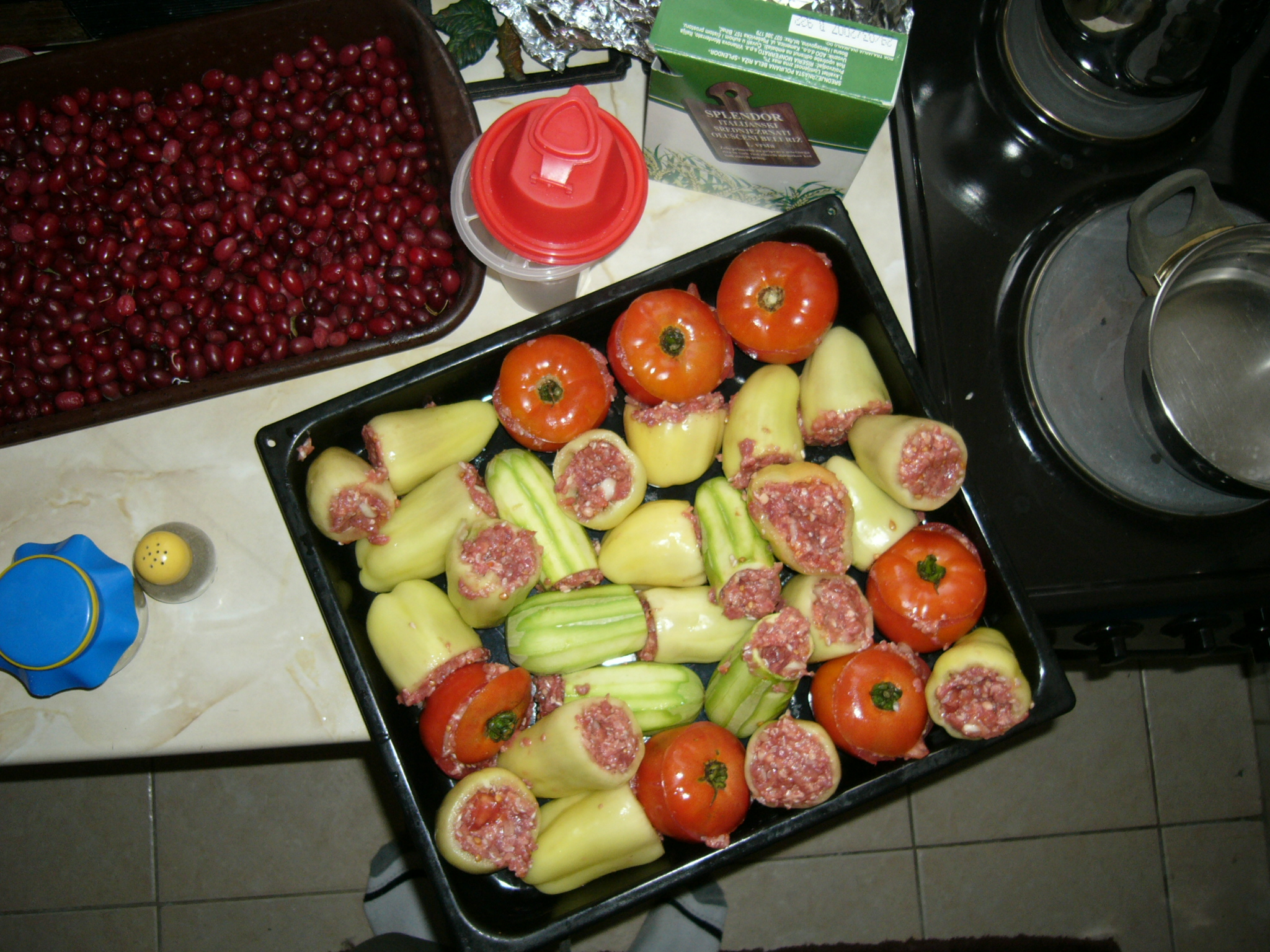
Stuffed peppers, tomatoes, and zucchini, oven-baked

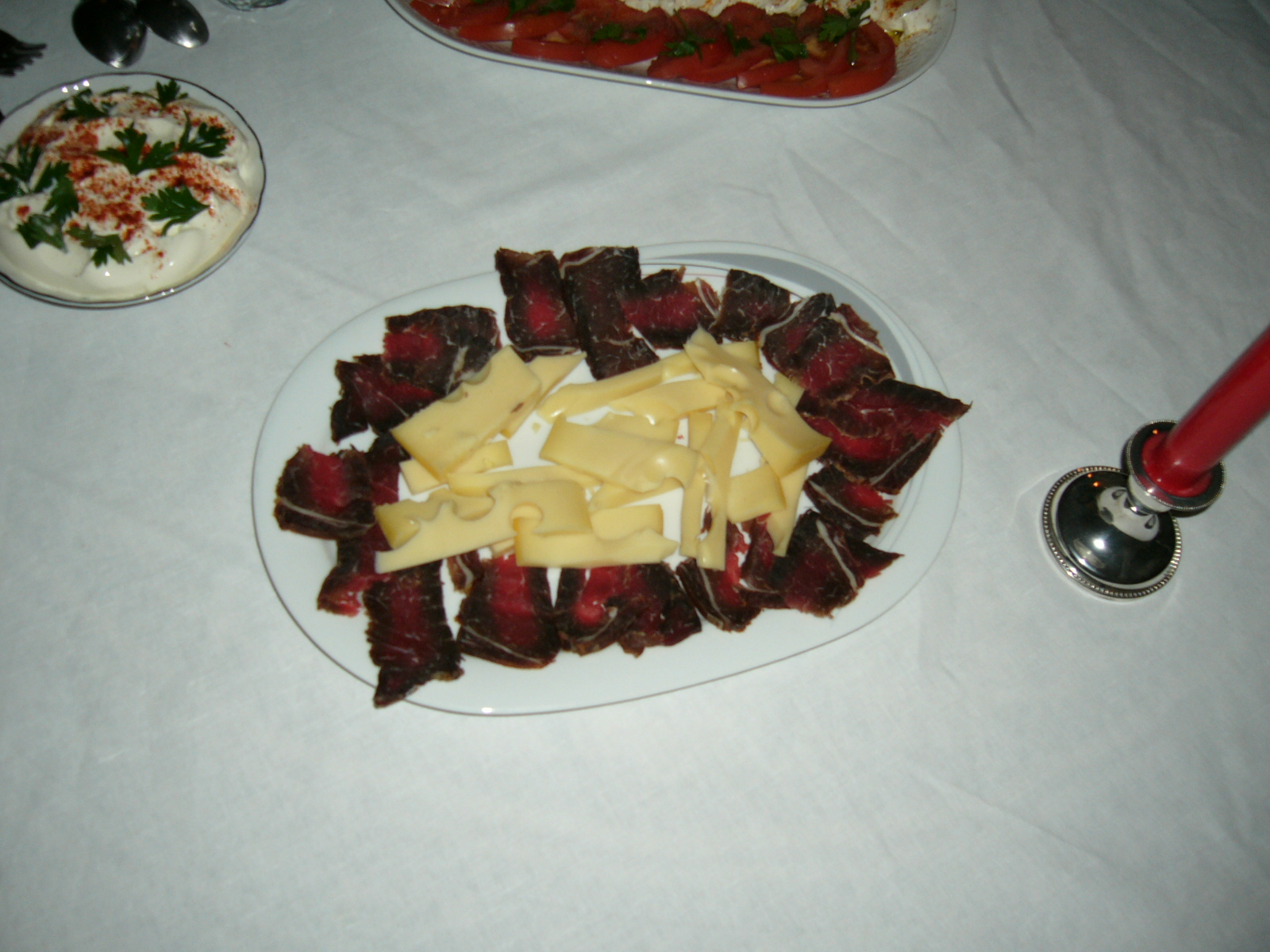
Suho meso (Smoked meat)
