= Bey's soup =

Dish from Bosnia and Herzegovina

Begova čorba
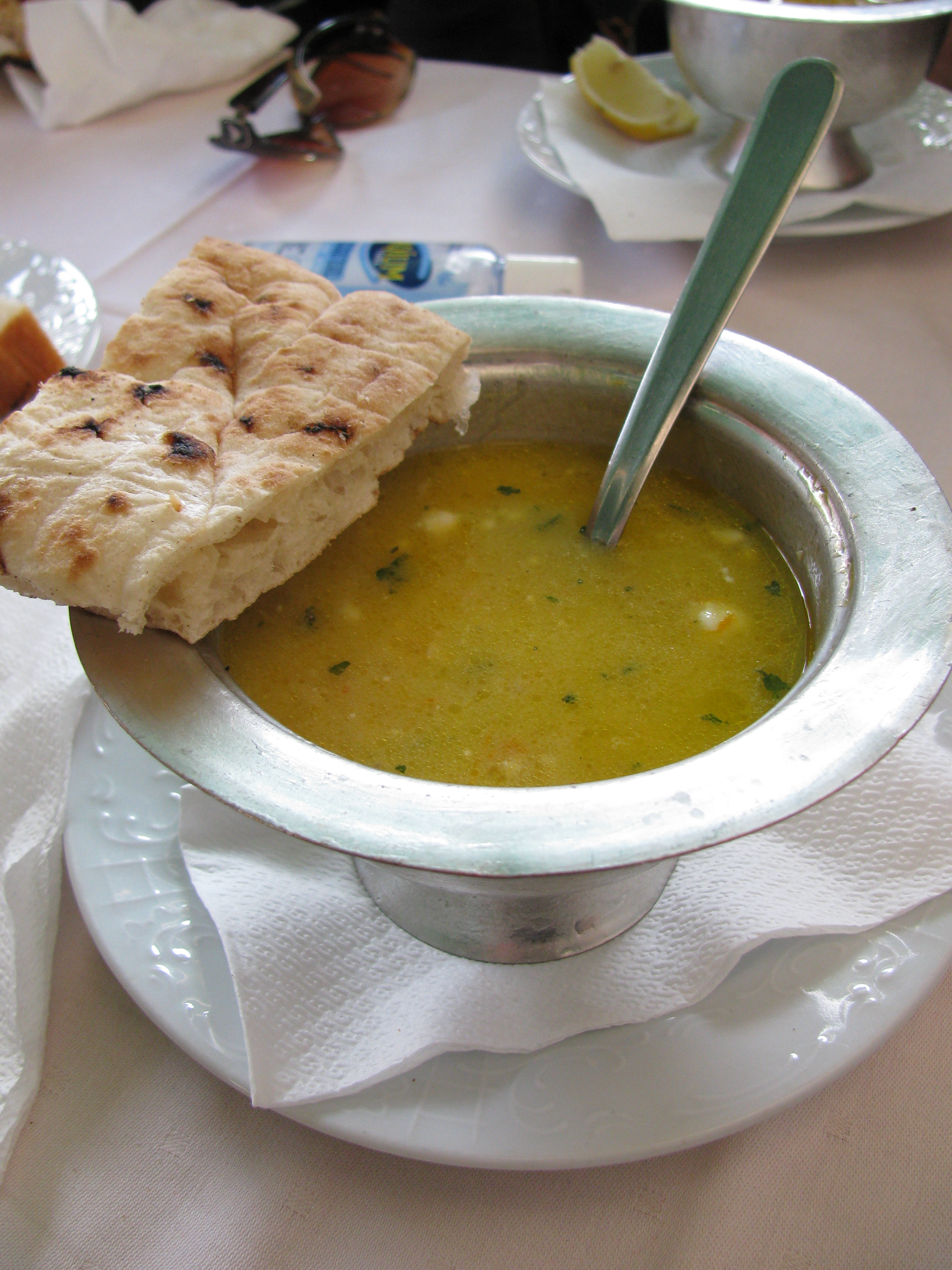
- Begova čorba
- Alternative names: Bey's soup
- Type: Soup
- Course: Appetizer
- Place of origin: Bosnia and Herzegovina
- Serving temperature: Warm
- Main ingredients: Chicken, chicken broth, carrots, parsley root or celery root, dried okra, eggs, wheat flour, butter, sour cream, lemon juice

Begova čorba (literally "Bey's soup") is a type of soup and a traditional festive dish from Bosnia and Herzegovina. It is commonly served as a warm appetizer in the form of a classic soup made with vegetables and chicken meat. The dish has its origins during the Ottoman period. It is associated with hospitality and traditionally served to guests on festive occasions, including weddings, celebrations, and religious holidays such as Eid and Ramadan.

== Etymology ==
The name derives from the Turkish word bey, meaning a gentleman or a person of high social standing, and the dish is therefore sometimes interpreted as “gentlemen’s soup.”

== Ingredients ==
It is made with chicken meat, chicken broth, vegetables such as carrots and parsley or celery root, dried okra, eggs, wheat flour, butter, sour cream, and lemon juice. Okra is considered a prized and highly sought-after vegetable. It is regarded as medicinal in folk tradition and is sold fresh, dried, or preserved in brine.

The soup may be made with various kinds of meat it, including veal, lamb, goat, and chicken.

== Preparation ==
Chicken is simmered in salted water with cleaned vegetables until tender, then the meat is deboned and cut up while the broth is strained. Separately cooked rice and soaked okra are added to the broth with the meat and vegetables, and the soup is briefly cooked further and seasoned with lemon juice and additional salt if needed. After being removed from the heat, it is finished with sour cream and egg yolks and is not boiled again to prevent scorching.

Although usually an appetizer, begova čorba may also be served as a main dish, especially when served with somun bread.
