= Romanian cuisine =

Culinary traditions of Romania

Romanian cuisine (Romanian: bucătăria românească) is the traditional cuisine of Romania, shaped by the country's varied geography, pastoral traditions, and agricultural heritage. Rooted in the landscapes of the Carpathian Mountains, it combines locally developed dishes with culinary influences acquired through centuries of cultural contact. Its foundations reflect the culinary practices of the region since antiquity, including the legacy of the Roman period, with influences from Balkan, Central European, Ottoman and French cuisines.

Romanian cuisine includes numerous holiday dishes arranged according to the mentioned season and holiday since the country has its religious roots in Eastern Orthodoxy. Romanian dishes consist of vegetables, cereals, fruits, honey, milk, dairy products, meat and game.

Various kinds of dishes are available, which are sometimes included under a generic term; for example, the category ciorbă includes a wide range of soups with a characteristic sour taste. Variations include meat and vegetable soup, tripe (ciorbă de burtă) and calf foot soup, or fish soup, all of which are soured by lemon juice, sauerkraut juice (zeamă de varză), vinegar, or borș (traditionally made from bran). The category țuică (plum brandy) is a name for a strong alcoholic spirit in Romania.

With the cuisine of Romania being shared by another country, namely Moldova, there are similarities between the cuisines of the two Romanian-speaking countries.

== History ==
In the history of Romanian culinary literature, Costache Negruzzi and Mihail Kogălniceanu were the compilers of a cookbook 200 Proven Recipes for Dishes, Pastries and Other Household Works (Romanian: 200 rețete cercate de bucate, prăjituri și alte trebi gospodărești), printed in 1841. Also, Negruzzi writes in "Alexandru Lăpușneanu", "In Moldavia, at this time, fine food wasn't fashioned. The greatest feast only offered a few types of dishes. After the borș, Greek dishes would follow, boiled with herbs floating in butter, and finally cosmopolitan steaks".

Cheese has been a part of Romanian cuisine since the beginning of its history. Brânză is the generic term for cheese in Romanian.

Maize and potatoes became staples of Romanian cuisine after their introduction to Europe. Maize, in particular, contributed to health and nutrition improvements of Romanians in the 16th and 17th centuries, resulting in a population boom.

For about three centuries, Wallachia and Moldavia, two of the three medieval Romanian principalities, were mildly influenced by their various neighbors, like the Ottoman Empire. Ottoman cuisine changed the Romanian table with appetizers made from various vegetables, such as eggplant and bell peppers, as well as various meat preparations, such as chiftele (deep-fried meatballs, a variation of kofta). The various kinds of ciorbă and meat-and-vegetable stews, such as iahnie de fasole (beans), ardei umpluți (stuffed peppers), and sarmale (stuffed cabbage) are influenced by Turkish cuisine.

== Description ==
Romanian recipes bear the same influences as the rest of Romanian culture. The Turks brought meatballs (perișoare in a meatball soup), from the Greeks there is musaca, from the Austrians there is the șnițel, and the list continues. The Romanians share many foods with the Balkan area and former Austria-Hungary. Some others are original or can be traced to the Romans, as well as other ancient civilizations. The lack of written sources in Eastern Europe makes it impossible to determine today the exact origin for most of them.

One of the most common meals is the mămăligă (polenta), served on its own or as an accompaniment. Pork is the main meat used in Romanian cuisine, but beef is also consumed, along with mutton and fish.

Before Christmas, on December 20 (Ignat's Day or Ignatul in Romanian), a pig is traditionally slaughtered by every rural family. A variety of foods for Christmas are prepared from the slaughtered pig, such as:

- Cârnați – garlicky pork sausages, which may be smoked or dry-cured;
- Lebăr – an emulsified sausage based on liver with the consistency of the filling ranging from fine (pâté) to coarse;
- Sângerete (black pudding) – an emulsified sausage obtained from a mixture of pig's blood with fat and meat, breadcrumbs or other grains, and spices;
- Tobă (head cheese) – based on pig's feet, ears, and meat from the head suspended in aspic and stuffed in the pig's stomach;
- Tochitură – a stew made with pork, smoked and fresh sausage simmered in a tomato sauce and served with mămăligă and wine ("so that the pork can swim"). There are many variations of this stew throughout Romania, with some versions combining different meats, including chicken, lamb, beef, pork and sometimes even offal;
- Pomana porcului—pan-fried cubed pork served right after the pig's sacrifice to thank the relatives and friends who helped with the process;
- Piftie/răcitură – inferior parts of the pig, mainly the tail, feet, and ears, spiced with garlic and served in aspic;
- Jumări – dried pork remaining from rendering of the fat and tumbled through various spices

The Christmas meal is sweetened with the traditional cozonac, a sweet bread made with nuts, poppy seeds, or rahat (Turkish delight).

At Easter, lamb is served: the main dishes are borș de miel (lamb sour soup), roast lamb, and drob de miel – a Romanian dish similar to haggis made from minced offal (heart, liver, lungs), lamb meat and spring onions with spices, wrapped in a caul and roasted. The traditional Easter cake is pască, a pie made from yeast dough with a sweet cottage cheese filling at the center.

Romanian pancakes, called clătite, are thin (like the French crêpe) and can be prepared with savory or sweet fillings: ground meat, cheese, or jam. Different recipes are prepared depending on the season or the occasion.

Wine is the preferred drink, and Romanian wine has a tradition of over three millennia. Romania is currently the world's ninth largest wine producer, and recently the export market has started to grow. Romania produces a wide selection of domestic varieties (Fetească, Grasă, Tămâioasă, Busuioacă, and Băbească), as well as varieties from across the world (Italian Riesling, Merlot, Sauvignon blanc, Cabernet Sauvignon, Chardonnay, and Muscat Ottonel). Beer is also highly regarded, generally blonde pilsener beer, made with German influences. There are also Romanian breweries with a long tradition.

According to the 2009 data of FAOSTAT, Romania is the world's second largest plum producer (after the United States), and as much as 75% of Romania's plum production is processed into the famous țuică, a plum brandy obtained through one or more distillation steps.

=== Vegetarianism and veganism ===
Followers of the Romanian Orthodox Church fast during several periods throughout the ecclesiastical calendar amounting to a majority of the year. In the Romanian Orthodox tradition, devotees keep to a diet without any animal products during these times. As a result, vegan foods are abundant in stores and restaurants; however, Romanians may not be familiar with a vegan or vegetarian diet as a full-time lifestyle choice. Many recipes below have vegan versions, and the vegetables section below contains many common fasting foods.

== List of dishes ==
=== Soups ===
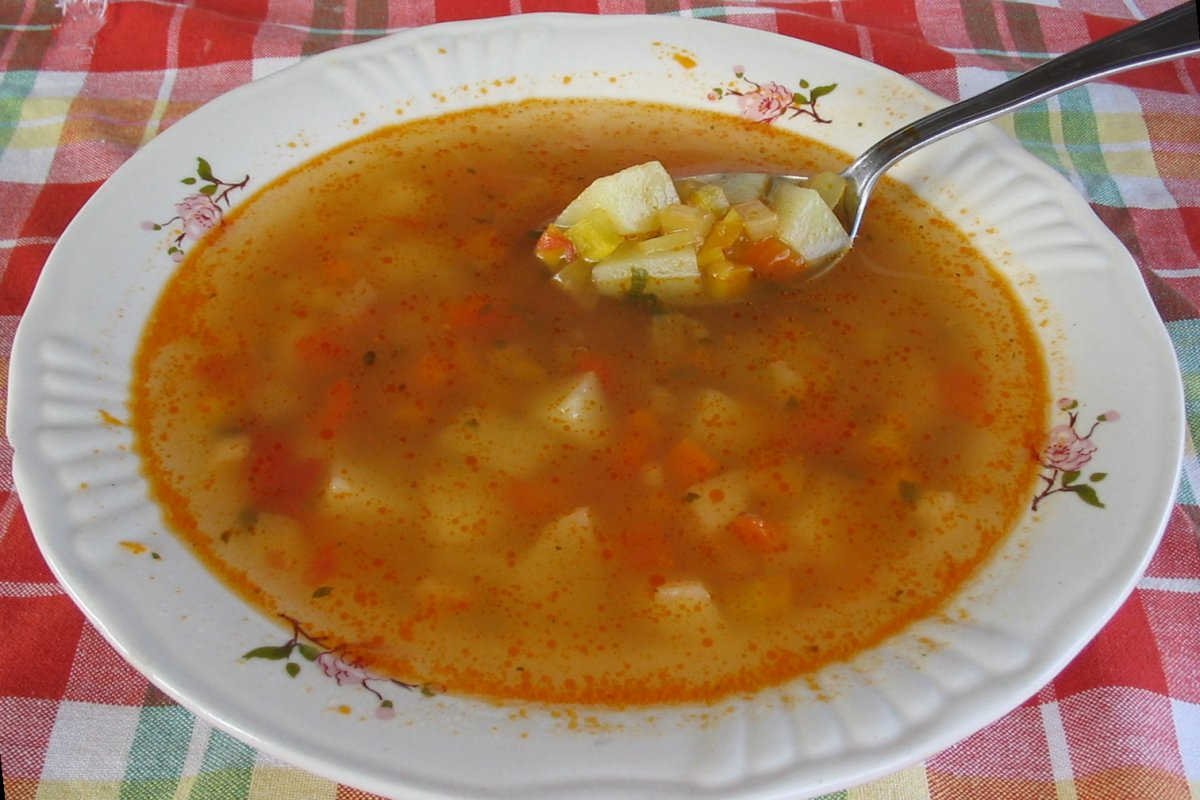
Ciorbă de cartofi

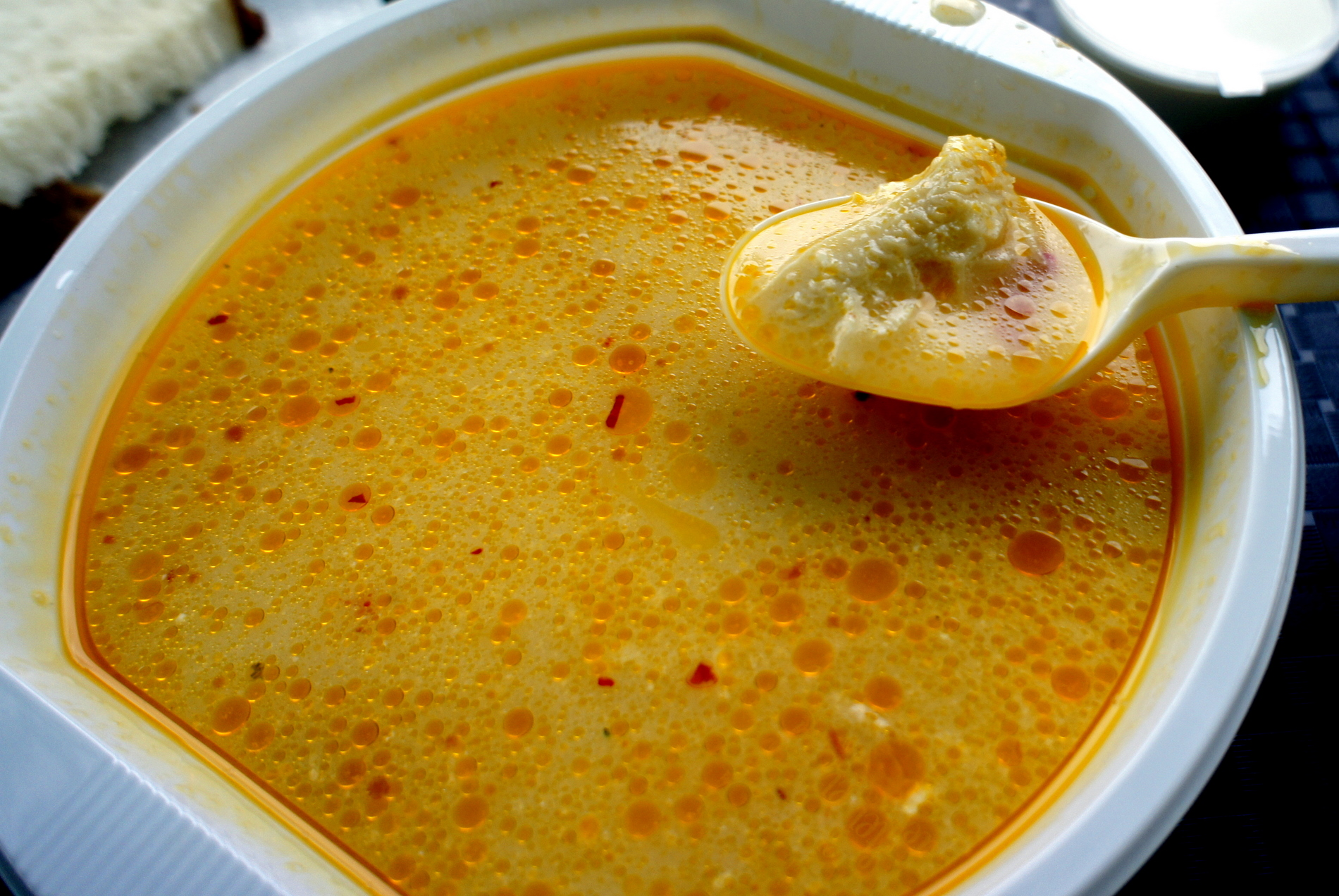
Ciorbă de burtă

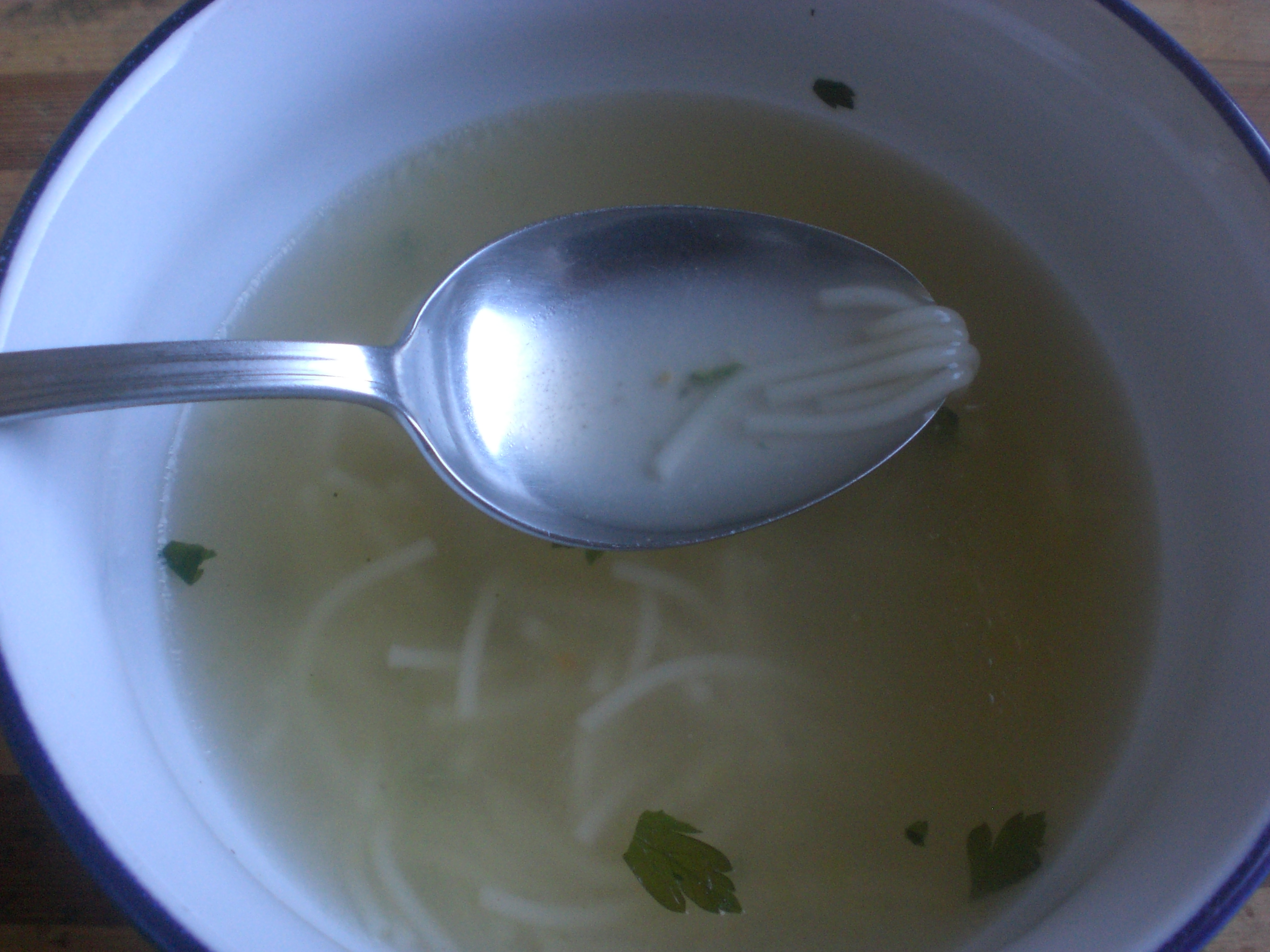
Supă (de pui) cu tăieței

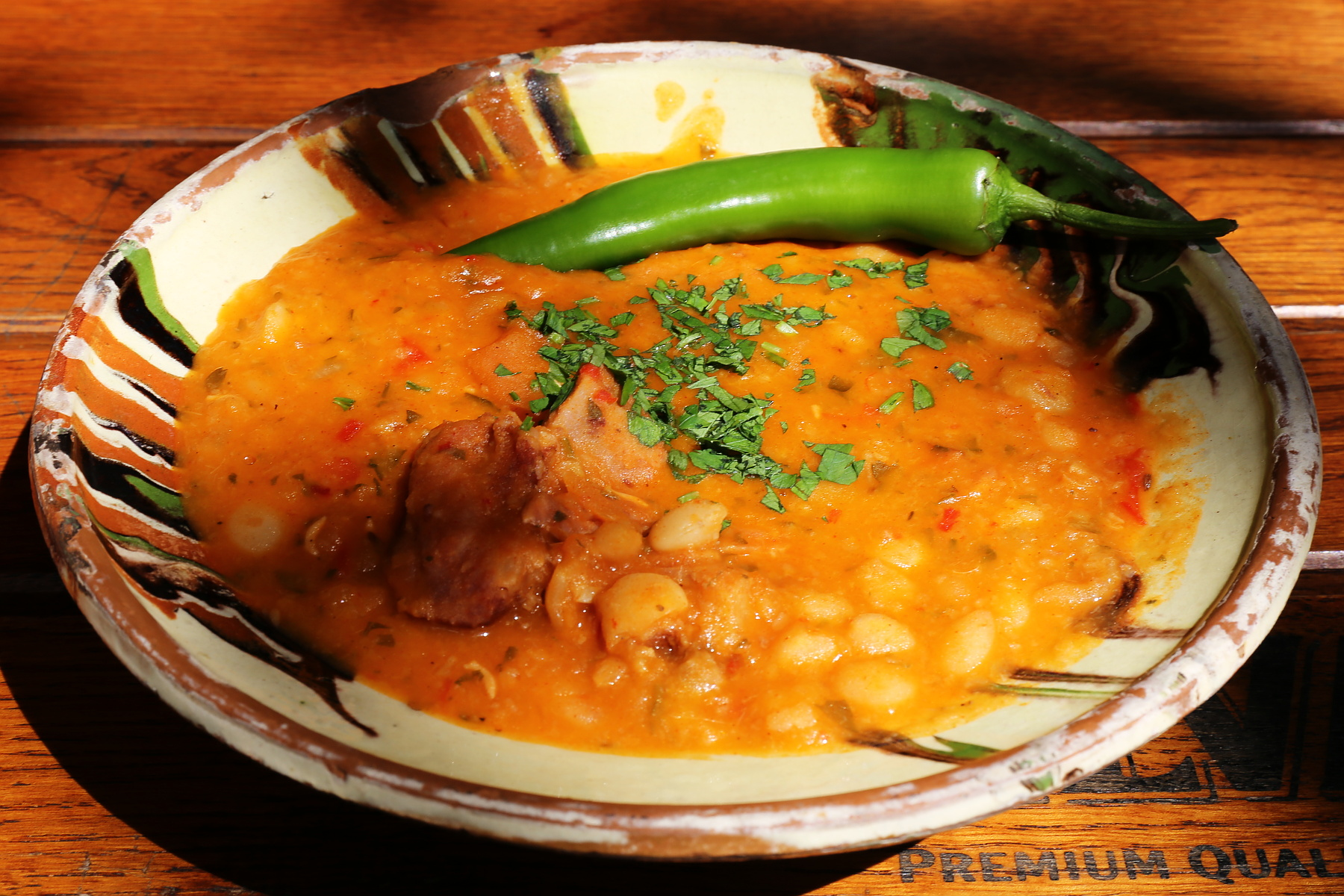
Beans and smoked meat, traditionally served with either fresh or pickled hot pepper

- Borș is fermented wheat bran, a souring agent for ciorbă. Borș is also used today as a synonym for ciorbă, but in the past, a distinction was made between borș and ciorbă (acritură), the souring agent for the latter being the juice of unripe fruits, such as grapes, mirabelle, or wood sorrel leaves.
  - Borș de burechiușe
- Ciorbă is the traditional Romanian sour soup
  - Ciorbă de burtă (tripe soup), with sour cream, egg yolks, garlic and soured with vinegar
  - Ciorbă de perișoare (meatball soup)
  - Ciorbă de fasole cu afumătură (bean and smoked meat soup)
  - Ciorbă de legume (vegetable soup)
  - Ciorbă de pește "ca-n Deltă" (fish soup prepared in the style of the Danube Delta; traditionally water directly from the Danube River is used)
  - Ciorbă de praz is a leek soup
  - Ciorbă de pui is a chicken soup
  - Ciorbă de lobodă is a red orach soup
  - Ciorbă de salată cu afumătură (green lettuce and smoked meat soup) with sour milk
  - Ciorbă de sfeclă, also called borș de sfeclă or borș rusesc (similar to borscht)
  - Ciorbă de urechiușe, wild mushroom sour soup
  - Ciorbă moldovenească de găină is a hen sour soup
  - Ciorbă țărănească (peasant soup), made from a variety of vegetables and any kind of meat (beef, pork, mutton, chicken, fish)
  - Storceag, fish soup with sour cream and egg, soured with vinegar or lemon juice.
- Supă (generic name for sweet (usually clear) soups, made from vegetables alone or combined with poultry and beef). The difference between supă and ciorbă is that the meat and most of the vegetables are removed, the resulting liquid being served with dumplings or noodles. There are also a number of sour soups which use lemon juice as a souring agent, called supe a la grec (Greek soups).
  - Supă (de pui) cu găluște (clear dumpling soup with chicken broth)
  - Supă (de pui) cu tăiței (clear noodle soup with chicken broth)

=== Meat ===
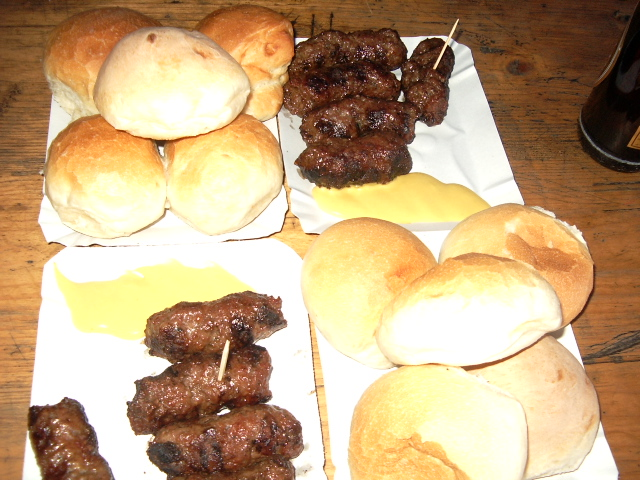
Mititei, mustard, and bread rolls

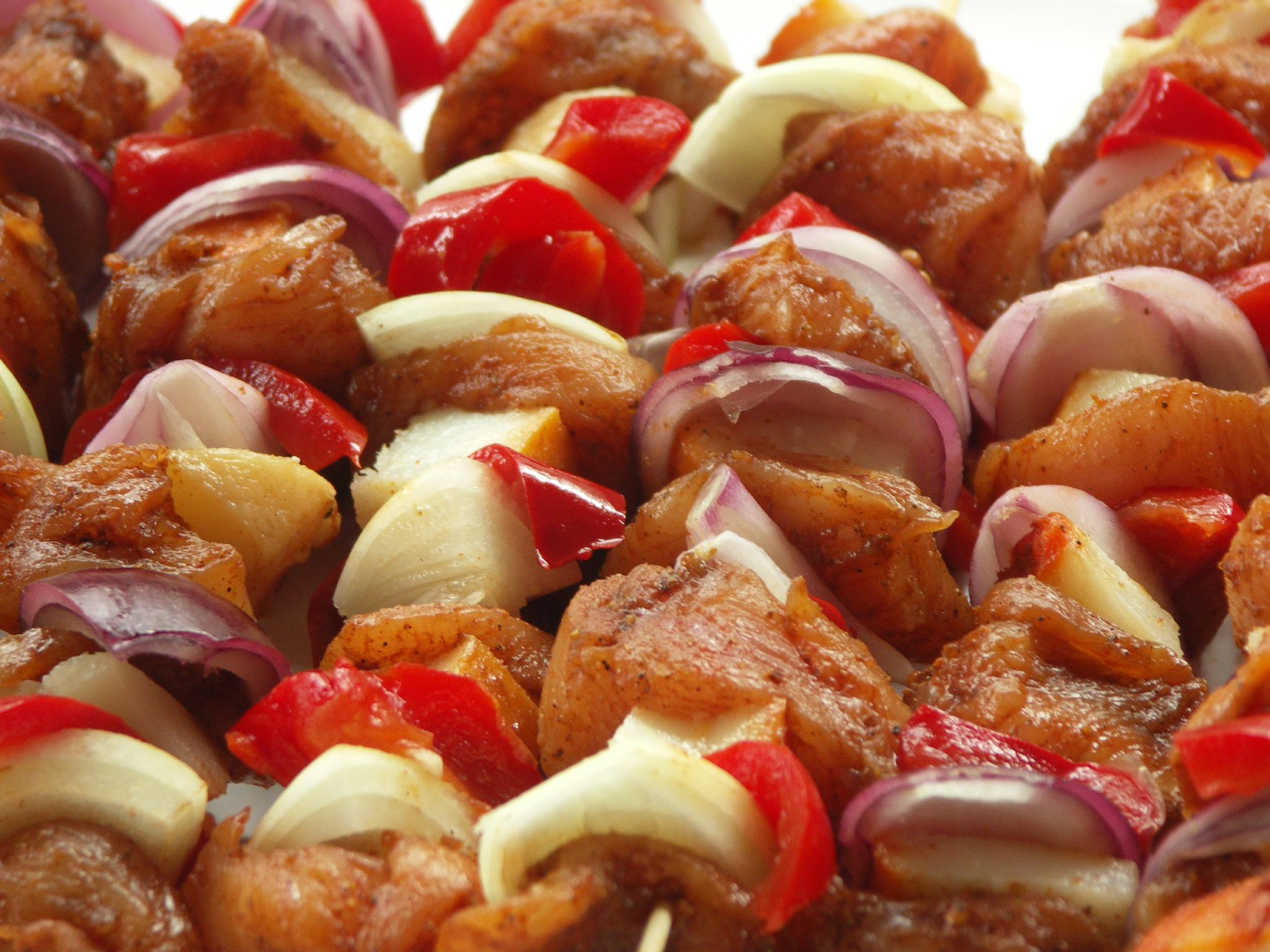
Frigărui, Romanian-style kebabs

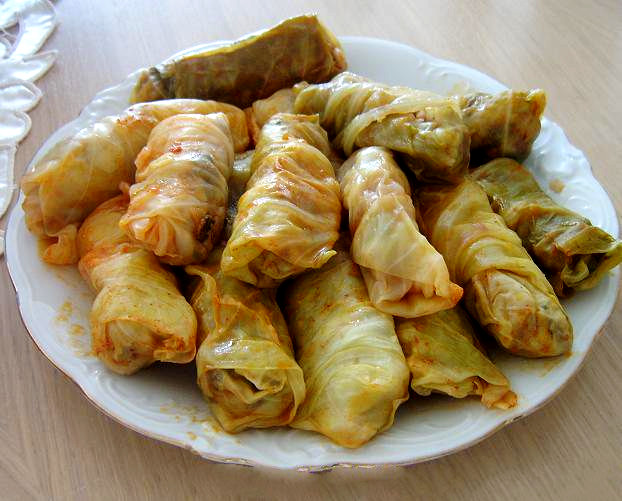
Sarmale in pickled cabbage leaves

- Caltaboș / chișcă - a cooked sausage made from minced pork organs mainly liver, rice, onions, herbs (parsley, dill) and spices, stuffed in a pig's bowel casing
- Cârnați - a garlicky sausage, mostly smoked, stuffed in clean, blanched small bowel as in Fasole cu cârnați
- Cevapcici - grilled dish of minced meat eaten in areas populated by Serbian minority, mostly in the Romanian part of Banat
- Chiftele - a type of small meatball made of ground pork, beef, lamb mixed with breadcrumbs and egg, onions, garlic and parsley.
  - Ciulama de vițel - veal ciulama white thick flour and sour cream sauce
  - Ciulama de pui - chicken ciulama
- Drob de miel - a lamb haggis made from minced organs wrapped in a caul and roasted like a meatloaf; a traditional Easter dish, usually with encased boiled eggs
- Frigărui - Romanian-style shish-kebab, made with pork or a mixture of ground pork and chicken, similar to the Iranian kubideh, but with different herbs and spices.
- Limbă cu măsline - cow tongue with olives
- Mititei (mici) - grilled minced meat rolls, traditionally made from lamb meat, or from mixed meats (pork, veal, lamb) with lots of spices (garlic, thyme, pepper, paprika, and others)
- Grătar (usually made together with "mici") - grilled pork/beef, thinly sliced with condiments
- Musaca - an eggplant, potato, and meat pie
- Ostropel - method of cooking chicken or duck or any meat. It is a slow-cooked fried meat in tomato sauce.
- Papricaș - Chicken paprikash made with bell pepper and paprika, originating from Hungary
- Gulaș - Goulash, a stew made with potato and beef, originating from Hungary
- Jumări - kind of pork cracklings, with fat thermally extracted from the lard
- Pastramă - a food originating from Romania usually made from beef brisket, or from lamb, pork, chicken or turkey. The raw meat is brined, partially dried, seasoned with herbs and spices, then smoked and steamed. Like corned beef, pastrami was originally created as a way to preserve meat before the invention of refrigeration.
- Pârjoale - a type of meatball bigger than chiftele, originating in Moldova, with breadcrumbs and parsley
- Piftie - the preparation of this dish is similar to the French demi-glace. Pork stock is reduced by simmering, which is placed in containers, and spiced with garlic and sweet paprika powder. The boiled pork meat is then added, and left to cool. The cooled liquid has a gelatinous consistency, salty, garlicky and peppery. It is eaten cold.
- Plescavița - hamburger type meat consisted of spiced minced pork, beef and lamb meat, originating from Serbia
- Pleșcoi sausages - registered as a Romanian protected geographical indication (PGI) product in the European Union
- Rasol - slowly stewed beef at low fire, usually served with a garlic paste (mujdei)
- Salam de Sibiu - a variety of salami registered as a Romanian protected geographical indication (PGI) product in the European Union
- Sarmale - stuffed sour cabbage or grape leaves with ground meat with rice, onions, herbs. It is boiled for a few hours traditionally in ceramic pots. In Transylvania smoked pig feet or pork skins are placed in the pot between the stuffed cabbages. There are also many vegan varieties stuffed with rice and herbs.
- Slănină - pork fat, often smoked with paprika, herbs and pepper
- Shawarma - locally known as șaormă, it is one of the most popular street foods in the country.
- Șnițel - a chicken, pork, veal, or beef breaded cutlet (a variety of Viennese schnitzel)
  - Cordon bleu șnițel - breaded pork tenderloin stuffed with ham and cheese
  - Mozaic șnițel - a specialty of Western Romania, which is two thin layers of different meats with a mushroom filling. Other vegetable fillings may be used instead of mushrooms.
  - Șnițel de pui - breaded chicken breast cutlet
- Stufat - lamb, onion, and garlic stew
- Tobă - pork sausage (usually pig's stomach, stuffed with pork jelly, snout, ears and skin)
- Tocană/tocăniță - meat stew
- Tocăniță vânătorească - venison stew
- Tochitură - pan-fried cubed pork, fresh salty cheese (brânză de burduf or telemea), fried eggs, sausages served with mămăligă and wine
- Varză călită - fried or sauteed cabbage with pork ribs, duck, or sausages
- Virșli - a type of sausage made from a mixture of goat or lamb with pork

=== Fish ===
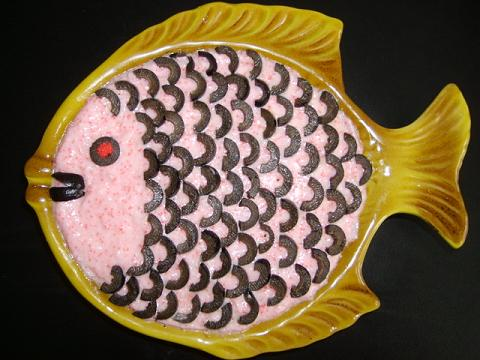
Romanian roe salad decorated with black olives.

- Chiftele de pește - fish meatballs
- Crap pane - breaded carp fillet
- Ghiveci cu pește - fish stew with vegetables
- Macrou afumat - smoked mackerel fillet
- Novac afumat din Țara Bârsei - smoked carp fillet, registered as a Romanian protected geographical indication (PGI) product in the European Union
- Pană de somn rasol - catfish in brine with garlic
- Plachie din pește - ragout of river fish with vegetables
- Papricaș de pește - fish papricaș
- Salată de icre - roe salad, traditionally made from carp, pike, or various marine fish species, called tarama, with onion
  - Salată cu icre de știucă de Tulcea - a variety of salată de icre registered as a Romanian protected geographical indication (PGI) product in the European Union
  - Salata tradițională cu icre de crap - another variety of salată de icre registered as a Romanian protected geographical indication (PGI) product in the European Union
- Saramură de crap - carp in brine
- Scrumbie de Dunăre afumată - smoked pontic shad, registered as a Romanian protected geographical indication (PGI) product in the European Union

=== Vegetables ===
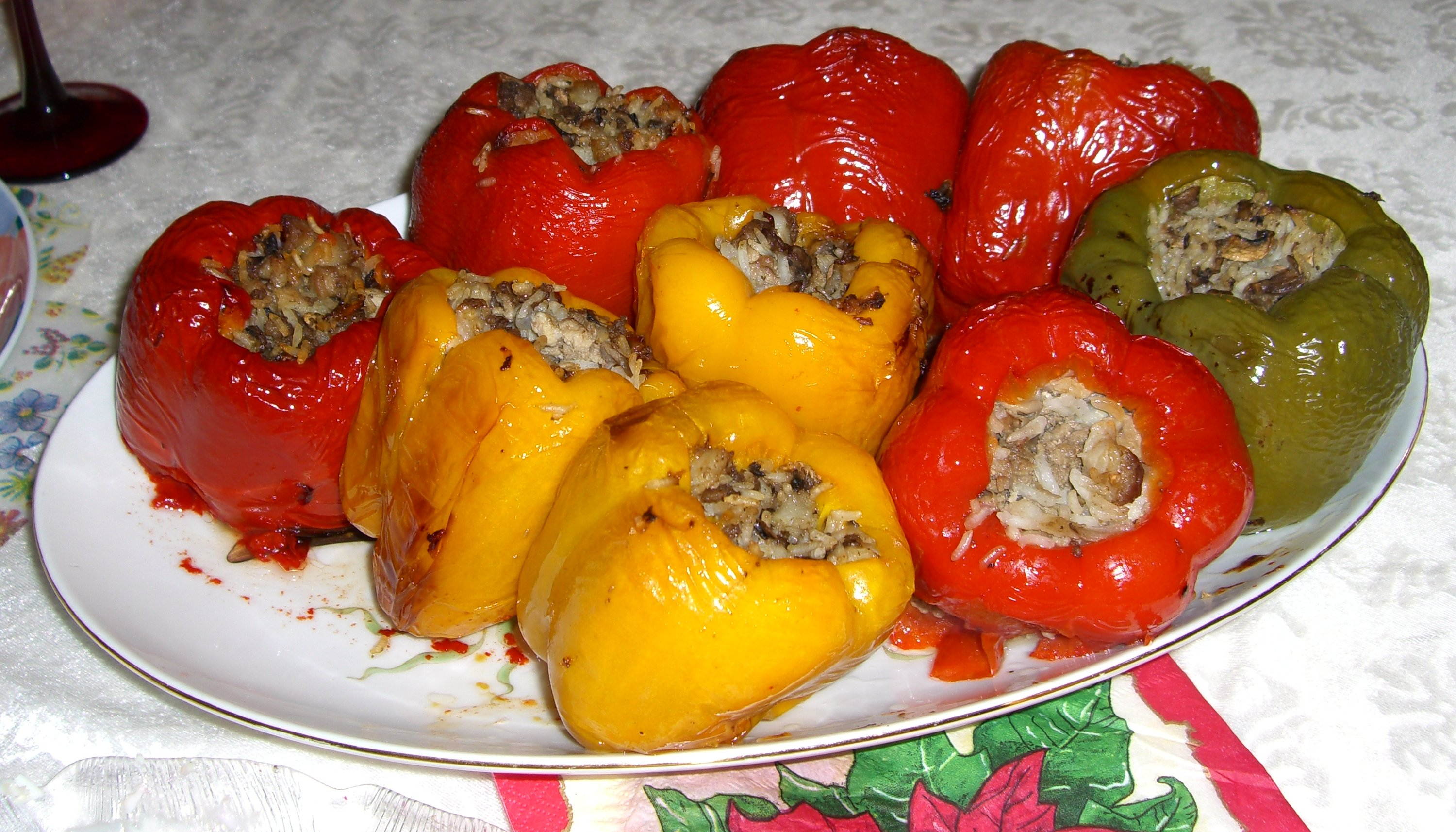
Ardei umpluți

- Ardei umpluți - stuffed bell peppers with meat, rice, onions
- Dovlecei umpluți - stuffed zucchini
- Gulii umplute - stuffed kohlrabi
- Găluște - boiled dumplings; similar to knedle or knödel in Central European cuisines
- Vinete umplute - stuffed eggplant
- Sarmale - stuffed cabbage rolls, also made from grape or dock leaves similar to Dolma
- Ghiveci - a vegetable stew similar to the Bulgarian gjuvec and the Hungarian lecsó
- Ghiveci călugăresc - vegetable stew prepared by the nuns in the monasteries
- Fasole batută - bean paste made from Romanian refried beans, uses white or cannellini beans, with the addition of olive or sunflower oil and minced garlic. The dish is traditionally served with fried onions as a garnish.
- Mămăligă - cornmeal mush, also known as Romanian-style polenta. Mămăligă can be served as a side dish or form the basis of further dishes, such as mămăligă cu lapte (polenta with hot milk), bulz (baked polenta with Romanian sheep cheese and sour cream), mămăliguță cu brânză și smântănă (polenta with telemea (Romanian cheese similar to feta) and sour cream), and others.
- Mâncare de mazăre - pea stew
- Mâncare de praz - leek stew
- Pilaf - a dish of rice, vegetables, and pieces of meat (optional). The meat is usually the offal, wings, and organs of chicken, pork, or lamb. The cooking method is very similar to risotto.
- Chifteluțe de ciuperci - chiftele made from mushrooms instead of meat
- Șnițel de ciuperci - mushroom fritter (șnițel is the Romanian spelling of the German word schnitzel (breaded boneless cutlet), but it may be used to mean any sort of fritter)
- Tocană de ciuperci - mushroom stew made with fried mushrooms, garlic and dill (sometimes sour cream is added)
- Tocăniță de gălbiori - chanterelle stew
- Zacuscă - vegetable spread consisting of roasted eggplant, sauteed onions, tomato paste, and roasted red peppers cooked for a long time at a low temperature

== List of salads ==
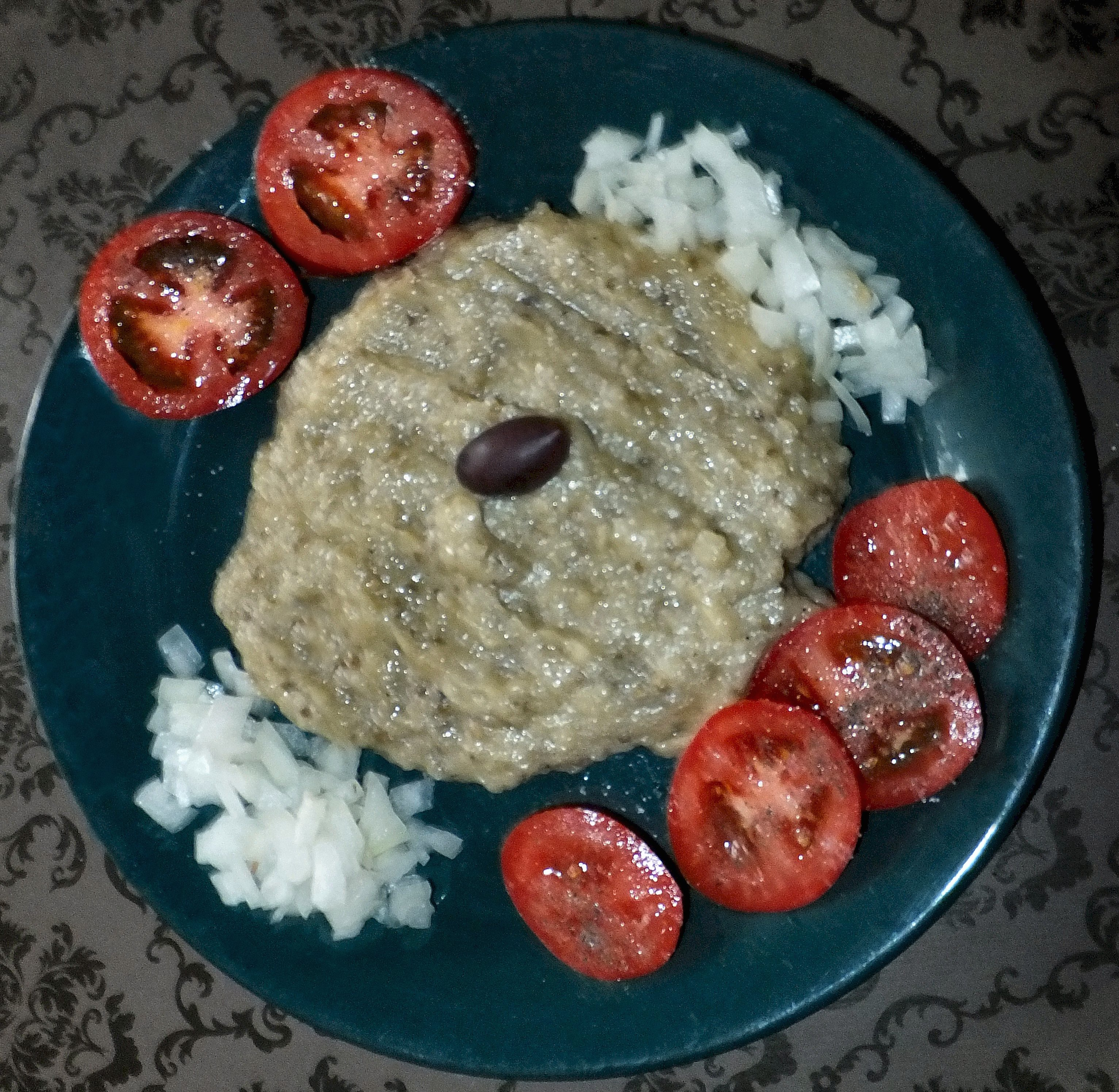
Salată de vinete

- Ardei copți - roasted pepper salad, with vinegar and sunflower
- Murături - method of pickling different fruits and vegetables
  - Castraveți murați - pickled small cucumbers with dill, garlic and parsley root
  - Gogonele murate - pickled green tomatoes, which is the simple version of murături asortate
  - Varză murată - cabbage pickled in brine, flavored with dill stalks and beetroots for red colour.
  - Murături asortate - pickled mixed vegetables; a combination of any of the following: onions, garlic, green tomatoes, peppers, cucumbers, kohlrabi, beets, carrots, celery, parsley roots, cauliflower, apples, quince, unripe plums, small unripe watermelons, small zucchini, and red cabbage. It is most often cured in brine (Turkish version), though it can also be cured in vinegar (German version).
- Mujdei - crushed garlic sauce, made from garlic, salt, oil and water (for a mild taste, lemon or tomatoes may be added)
- Salată de boeuf - minced boiled meat with boiled vegetables, mayonnaise, and pickles
- Salată de vinete - roasted and peeled eggplant, chopped onions, and salt mixed with oil or mayonnaise
- Salată grecească - pieces of tomatoes, cucumbers, onion, feta cheese, olives, salt and olive oil
- Salată orientală - potato salad with eggs, onions, and olives
- Salată de sfeclă - beet salad
- Salată de roșii - tomato salad, with sliced onions, bell peppers, and cucumber. Flavored with dill or parsley.
- Shopska salad - known locally as Bulgarian salad, it is made from tomatoes, cucumbers, onion/scallions, raw or roasted peppers, telemea, and parsley. The vegetables are usually diced and salted, followed by a light dressing of sunflower/olive oil complemented with vinegar

== List of cheeses ==
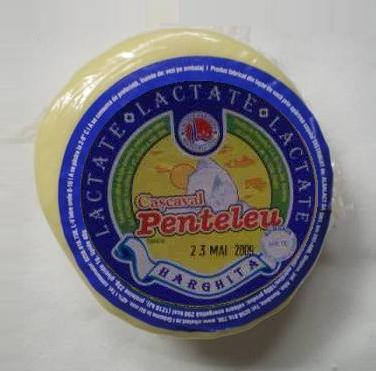
Cașcaval Penteleu, a type of Romanian cheese

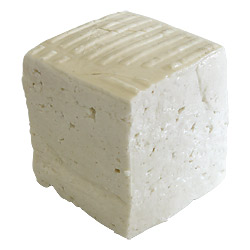
Telemea cheese

The generic name for cheese in Romania is brânză, and it is considered to be of Dacian origin. Most of the cheeses are made from cow's or sheep's milk. Goat's milk is rarely used. Sheep cheese is considered "the real cheese", although in modern times, some people refrain from consuming it due to its higher fat content and specific smell.

- Brânză de burduf is a kneaded cheese prepared from sheep's milk and traditionally stuffed into a sheep's stomach; it has a strong taste and semi-soft texture
- Brânză topită is a melted cheese and a generic name for processed cheese, industrial product
- Brânză în coșuleț is a sheep's milk, kneaded cheese with a strong taste and semi-soft texture, stuffed into bellows of fir tree bark instead of pig bladder, very lightly smoked, traditional product
- Caș is a semi-soft fresh white cheese, unsalted or lightly salted, stored in brine, which is eaten fresh (cannot be preserved), traditional, seasonal product
- Cașcaval is a semi-hard cheese made from sheep's or cow's milk, traditional product. The Cașcaval de Săveni is a type of cașcaval published as a Romanian protected geographical indication (PGI) product in the European Union.
  - Penteleu, a type of cașcaval, traditional product
- Năsal cheese is a type of cheese with a pungent aroma, traditional product
- Șvaițer, industrial product ("Schweizer Käse")
- Telemea, cow's or sheep's milk white cheese, vaguely similar to feta. The traditional "Telemea de Ibănești" is a type of telemea registered as a Romanian protected designation of origin (PDO) product in the European Union, while the "Telemea de Sibiu" is registered as a Romanian protected geographical indication (PGI) product in the European Union. Notably the "Telemea de Covurlui" is spiced with Nigella damascena seeds, which gives it a unique flavor.
- Urdă - made by boiling the whey drained from cow's or ewe's milk until the remaining proteins precipitate and can be collected, traditional product
- Zămătișe - a type of cottage cheese.

== List of desserts ==
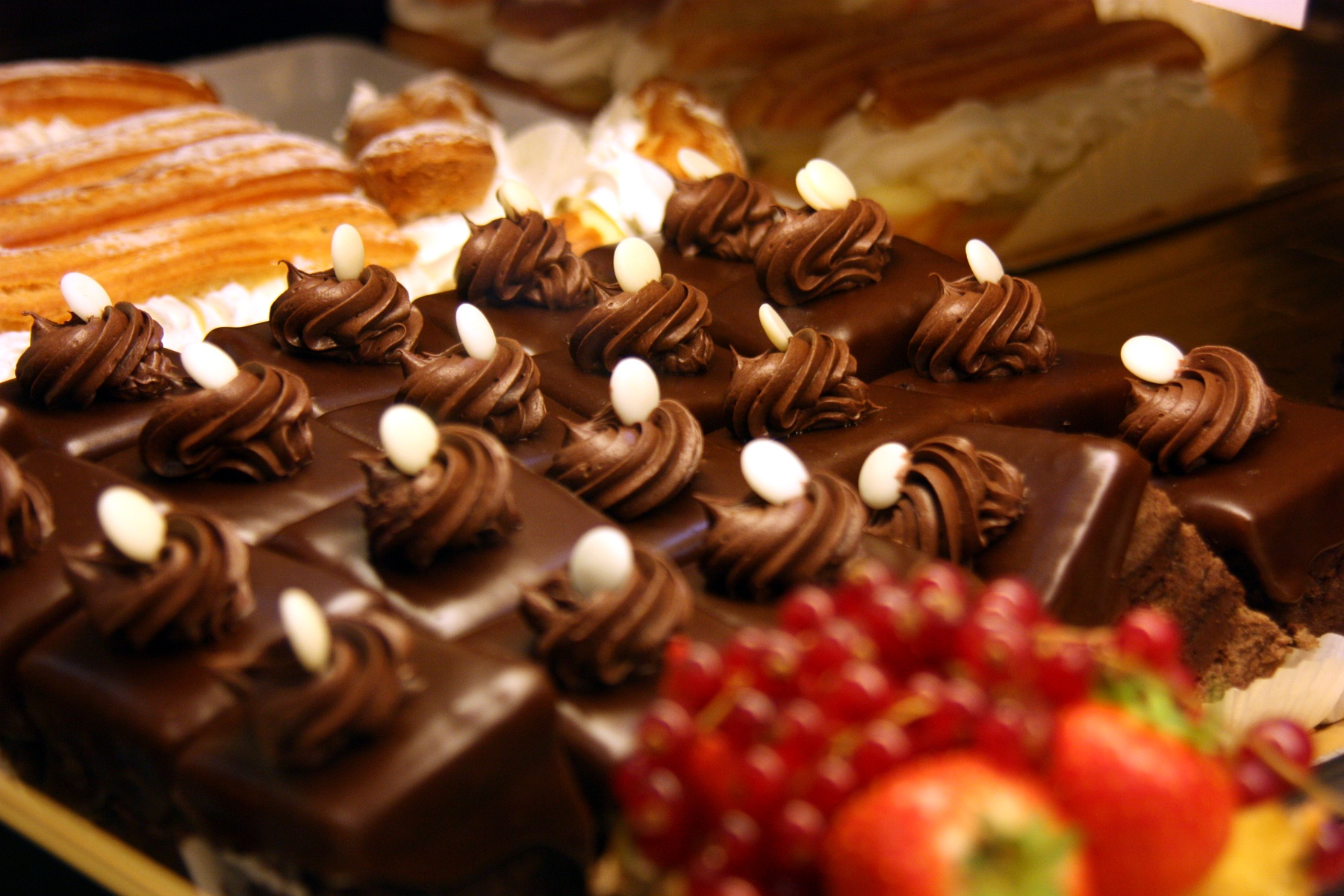
Amandine, Romanian chocolate sponge cake.

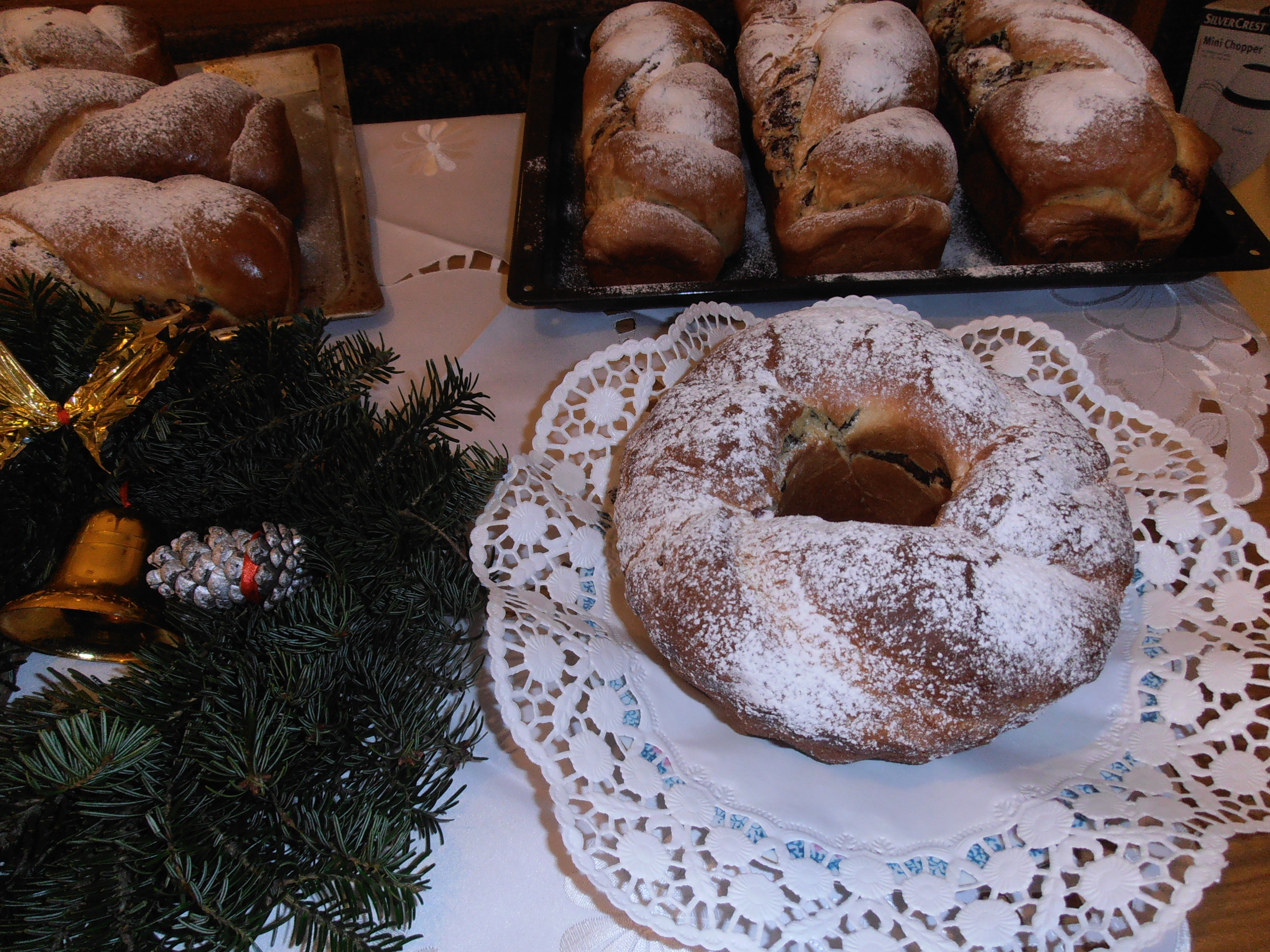
Cozonac in different shapes.

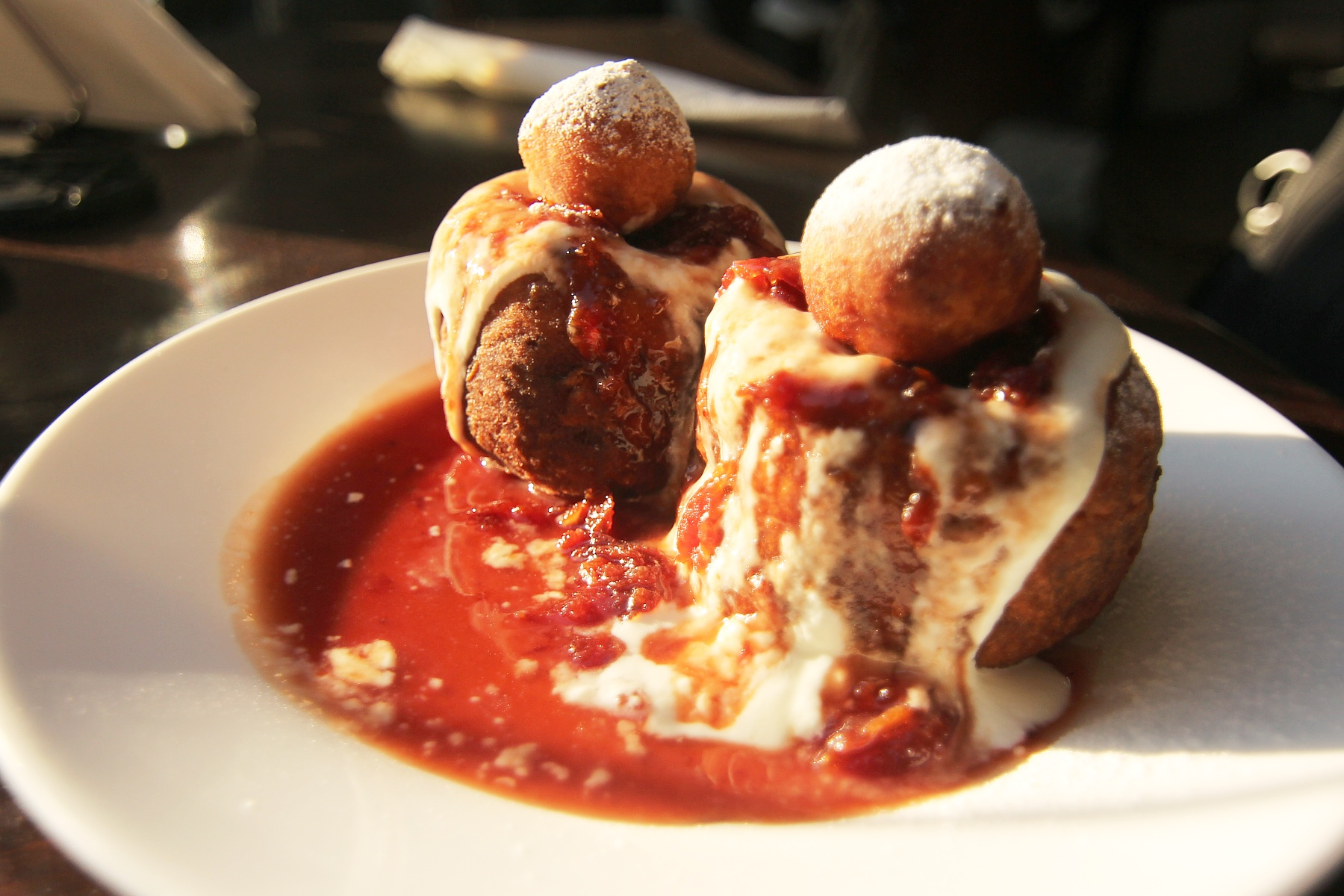
Papanași, Romanian doughnuts.

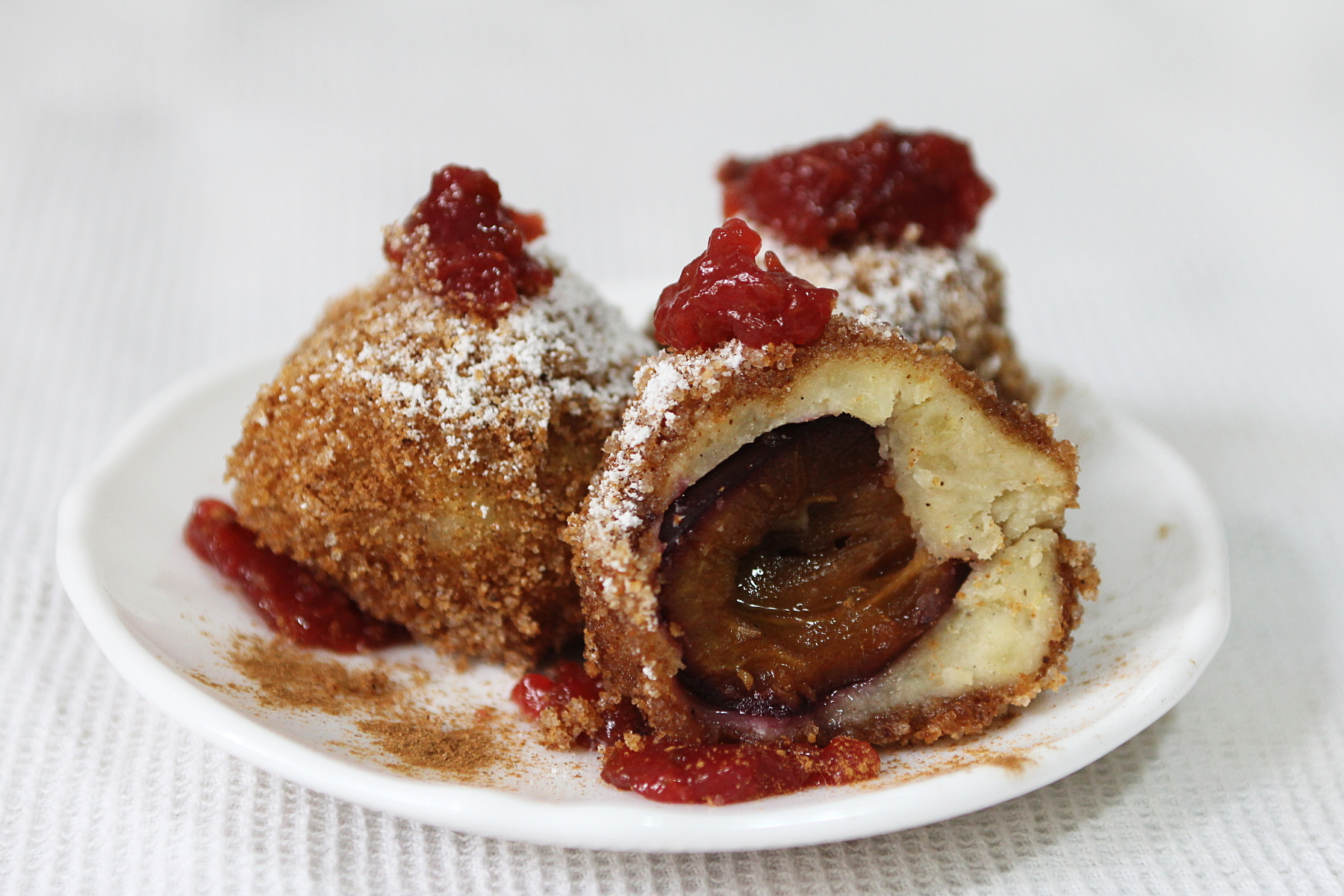
Gomboți (plum dumplings)

- Alivenci, corn and cheese pie in sweet and salted variants. Traditional dessert in Eastern Romania and Moldova.
- Amandine - chocolate sponge cake with almond and chocolate filling, glazed in chocolate
- Baclava
- Brânzoaice (Poale-n brâu moldovenești) - traditional Moldavian soft cakes filled with sweet cheese
- Carpați - Cake made with layers of sponge cake with chocolate and caramel cream, shaped in the form of a triangular prism, inspired by the Carpathian mountains.
- Cataife
- Chec - pound cake
- Clătite (crepes) with sweet filling - (literally: pancakes)
- Colivă - boiled wheat, mixed with sugar and walnuts (often decorated with candy and icing sugar; distributed at funerals and memorial ceremonies)
- Colțunași
- Cozonac secuiesc - spit cake rolled in granulated sugar and melted butter (Hungarian: Kürtőskalács)
- Cremă de zahăr ars - Crème brûlée
- Cremșnit - also known as vanilla slice or custard slice, is cream cake dessert commonly associated with the former Austro-Hungarian Monarchy.
- Doboș - sponge cake layered with chocolate buttercream and topped with caramel
- Gogoși - literally "doughnuts", but more akin to fried dough. In the Romanian part of Banat doughnuts are known by the name crofne
- Gomboți (Găluști cu prune) - dumplings with plums, a dessert made of mashed potatoes and flour dough and filled with fresh plums
- Griș cu lapte
- Halva
- Joffre cake - invented at the Casa Capșa restaurant in Bucharest
- Lapte de pasăre - literally "bird's milk", vanilla custard garnished with "floating islands" of whipped egg whites
- Magiun of Topoloveni - a type of plum jam, registered as a Romanian protected geographical indication (PGI) product in the European Union
- Mucenici/sfințișori - sweet pastries (shaped like "8", made from boiled or baked dough, garnished with walnuts, sugar, or honey, eaten on a single day of the year, on 9 March)
- Orez cu lapte - Rice pudding
- Pandișpan - Sponge cake
- Papanași - a kind of doughnut made from a mixture of sweet cheese, eggs, and semolina, boiled or fried and served with fruit syrup or jam and light sour cream
- Pelincile Domnului - a Moldavian type of pie made of honey-flavoured thin wheat cakes and hemp seed cream. Less and less exposure because of the confusion between Cannabis sativa (traditionally cultivated in Romania) and Cannabis indica (the THC-rich variety)
- Pișcoturi - thin, light, sweet delicate, crispy cookie
- Prăjituri - assorted pastries
- Rahat - Turkish delight
- Chocolate salami - salam de biscuiți (literally „salami of biscuits"), made from biscuits, chocolate, and rum essence. The cylindrical shape resembles a sausage, hence the name.
- Savarine - savarina
- Scovergi - flat fried dough. It is eaten with honey, jam or cheese.
- Șarlotă - a custard made from milk, eggs, sugar, whipped cream, gelatin, fruits, and ladyfingers; from the French Charlotte
- Ștrudel - is a type of layered pastry with a filling that is usually sweet, but savoury fillings are also common
- Tort - cake
- Tulumba
- Turtă dulce - gingerbread

== List of pastries ==
- Cornuri - bread roll that is rolled and formed into a crescent
- Cornulețe - pastries filled jam, chocolate, cinnamon sugar, walnuts, or raisins, with the shape representing a crescent
- Covrig - circular bread, typically encrusted with sesame seeds
- Covrigi - pretzel
- Cozonac - a kind of Stollen made from leavened dough, into which milk, eggs, sugar, butter, and other ingredients are mixed together before baking
- Pogace - corn cake baked in the oven; wheat flour dough cake, usually made with pork gizzards or cheese
- Plăcintă - traditional pastry
  - Plăcintă dobrogeană - a type of plăcintă registered as a Romanian protected geographical indication (PGI) product in the European Union
  - Burec - it is a three-cornered filo pie composed of thin sheets and filled with either walnuts, crushed almonds, cheese or minced meat
- Prăjituri - assorted pastries

== List of drinks ==
- Afinată - a liqueur made from afine (aka. bilberry in English), which are similar to the North American blueberry.
- Ayran - cold savory yogurt-based beverage that is consumed mostly in Dobrogea
- Bere - locally produced beer brands from local breweries and craft beers
- Cafea - Turkish coffee prepared in a cezve using very finely ground coffee beans without filtering
- Ceai - prepared in the form of either various plant tisanes (chamomile, mint, tilly flower, etc.) or common black tea, called ceai rusesc in Romanian, which is Russian tea usually served during breakfast.
- Chefir - fermented milk drink similar to a thin yogurt that is made from kefir grains, a specific type of mesophilic symbiotic culture.
- Horincă is a plum or apple brandy, produced in the northern part of the country (Maramureș)
- Lapte bătut - buttermilk
- Must - the grape juice in the fermentation process that hasn't become wine yet.
- Pălincă is a strong, double-distilled fruit brandy (especially plum, but also apple, apricots, peach, pear etc.) produced in Transylvania
- Pelin de mai is a wine specialty, usually produced in the spring, flavored with Artemisia dried plants
- Rachiu/Rachie is a fruit brandy. Generic "răchiu" can be made from any fruit (except plums), "țuică" is reserved exclusively for the variety of brandy made from plums.
- Rachiu de tescovină is a pomace brandy produced from grapes that have been used in wine production, very similar to the Italian grappa
- Rachia de Banat is a fermented and distilled fruit brandy (made especially from plums), produced in Banat.
- Sana is a kind of a drinkable yogurt
- Secărică is a caraway fruit-flavored vodka, similar to the German kümmel
- Sirop - prepared with syrup made from fir tree, pine, buckthorn, blueberry, raspberry, or strawberry, with different types of honey or sugar
- Socată is a non-alcoholic beverage made from fermented elderflower (Sambucus nigra)
- Șliboviță is a plum brandy, produced in the Banat region.
- Turț is a strong, double-distilled plum brandy, named after the village of Turț in northwestern Romania
- Țuică is a plum brandy
- Vin
- Vișinată is a sour cherry liqueur
- Vodcă
- Zmeurată is a raspberry liqueur

== See also ==
- Moldovan cuisine
- Transylvanian Saxon cuisine

== Other sources ==
- Nicolae Klepper, Taste of Romania, Hippocrene, New York, 1999, ISBN 978-0-7818-0766-1, ISBN 0-7818-0766-2
