= List of Turkish soups =

Turkish cuisine has a diverse tradition of soups, known as çorba, many of which are associated with particular cities or regions in Turkey. Turkish soups can be classified according to their main ingredients into five groups: vegetable, grain, milk and yoghurt, dried-legume, and meat. Today, there are approximately 300 documented soup varieties in Turkey, while the number can exceed 1,000 when regional variations in ingredients and preparation methods are included.

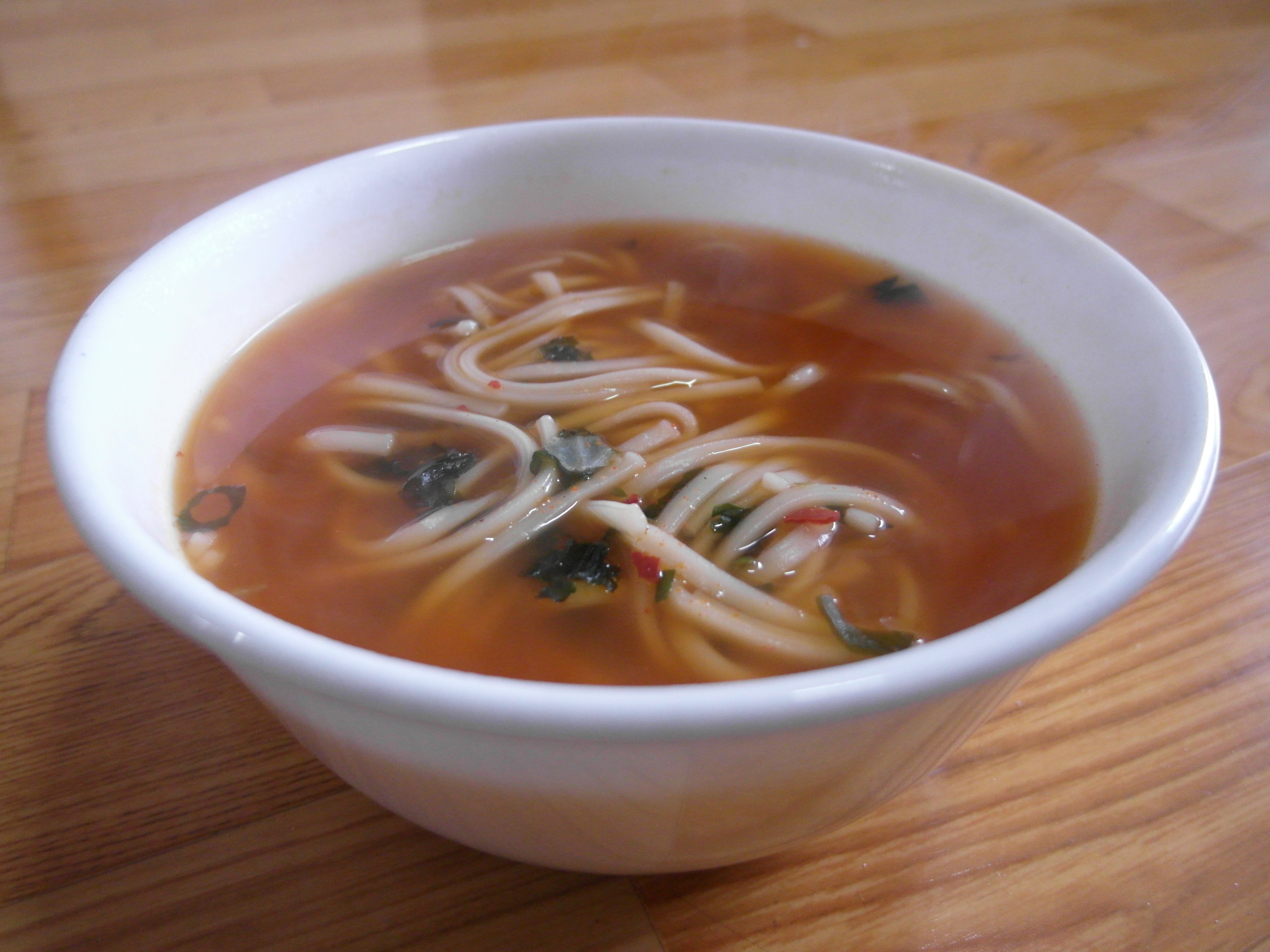
Erişte çorbası

== Vegetable soups ==
- Alişka çorbası: a speciality of Trabzon and Sakarya, prepared with chicken, potatoes, and small pieces of soft dough
