= Amandine (dessert) =

Chocolate layer cake from Romania

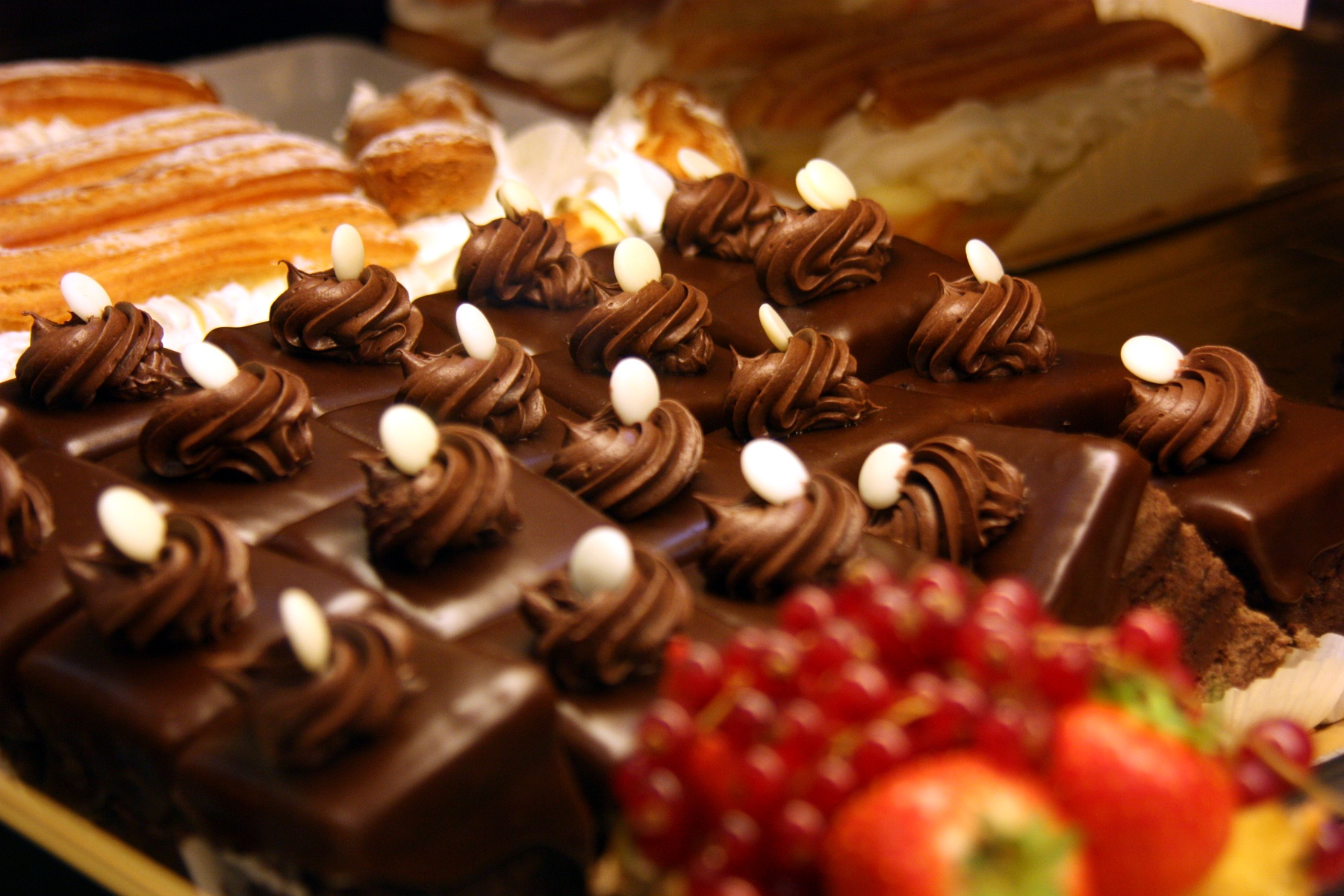
- Type: Layer cake
- Course: Dessert
- Place of origin: Romania
- Region or state: Central Europe, South-East Europe/Balkans
- Main ingredients: Caramel/chocolate layers, chocolate with caramel and fondant cream

Amandine (Romanian: amandină) is a Romanian chocolate layered cake filled with chocolate, caramel and fondant cream. Almond cream is sometimes used.

These cakes are among the most traditional "sweetshop" cakes in Romania. The original recipe has layers of chocolate sponge cake soaked in rum flavored caramel syrup. The cream filling is a combination of chocolate buttercream mixed with fondant. The assembled layers are glazed with a combination of fondant with chocolate and rum or rum essence, poured over the cake while still slightly liquid.

These cakes also have a traditional decoration on top with a little bit of the cream and a diamond-shaped piece of thin chocolate.
