= Drob =

Traditional Romanian dish

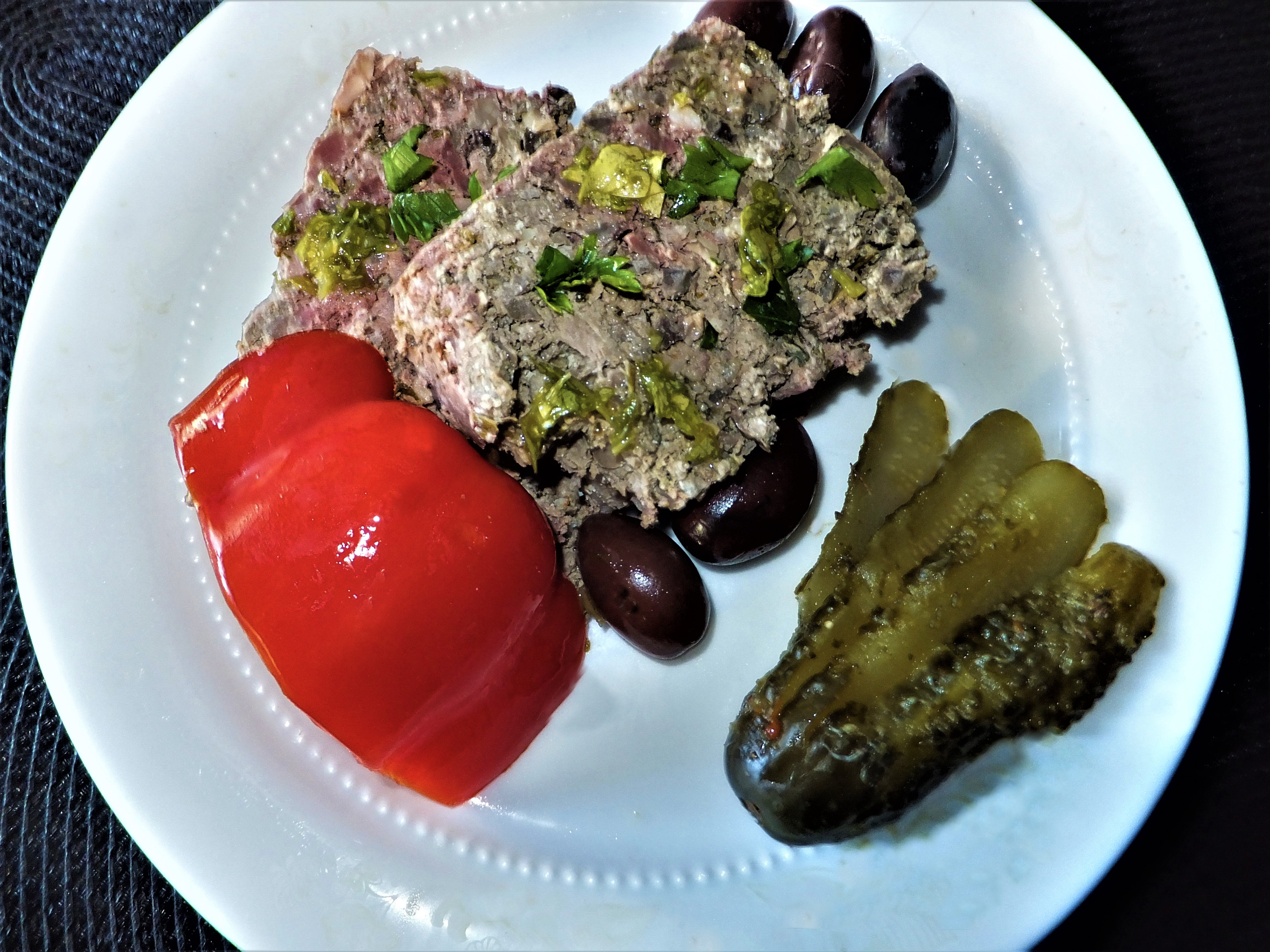
Lamb Drob

Drob, fully named Drob de Miel (Lamb Drob) or Drob de Paște (Easter Drob), is a traditional Romanian dish of lamb offals (liver, lungs, spleen, heart, kidney), green onions, herbs (dill, parsley, garlic, lovage), eggs (boiled or fresh), and bread soaked in water or milk. The boiled offals are chopped and mixed with all the other ingredients and seasoned with salt and pepper. The caul of the lamb is stretched over a loaf pan and filled with the mixture.

Lamb drob is one of the most popular traditional dishes, so there are a number of variations of the recipe. One of these is the use of a sheet of dough instead of the caul. Usually, boiled eggs are placed in the middle of the loaf.

In the world there are a few dishes similar to lamb drob, such as haggis, or faggots. However, while haggis uses mutton or lamb it is boiled in the stomach of the sheep, while faggots, which do use the caul, are made from pork offal.

== See also ==
- List of offal dishes
- List of lamb dishes
