= Penteleu =

Romanian cheese made with sheep milk

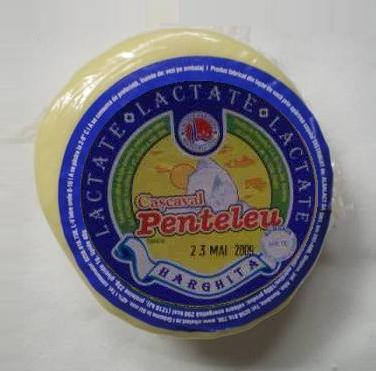
- Country of origin: Romania
- Town: Penteleu
- Source of milk: Sheep
- Pasteurised: Traditionally, no
- Texture: Semi hard
- Certification: Romanian Cașcaval have PDO status since 2005.

Penteleu or Cașcaval de Penteleu is a Romanian cheese made with sheep milk, originally from the Buzău Mountains region. It is made using the same process as caşcaval, and can be consumed as a table cheese or it can be used to complement traditional Romanian dishes such as mămăligă.

== See also ==
- Kashkaval
