= Năsal cheese =

Traditional Romanian cheese

Năsal
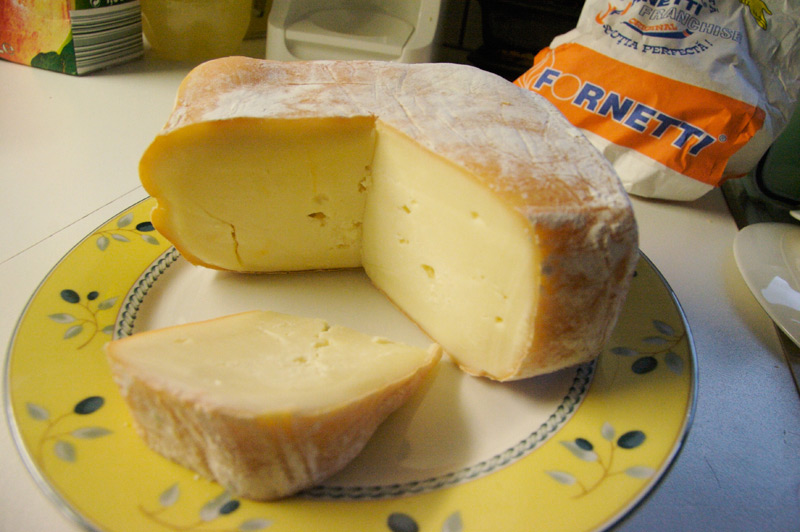
- Country of origin: Romania
- Region: Cluj county
- Town: Năsal
- Source of milk: Cow
- Pasteurised: Traditionally, no
- Texture: Sweet
- Named after: Năsal[*]

Năsal is a traditional Romanian cheese bearing the same name as the village where it is produced in the Țaga commune, Cluj County. It is a smear-ripened cheese made from cow's milk. Năsal is produced by Napolact, in a natural cave, traditionally used in the cheese-making process from the Middle Ages. Its characteristics and flavour are imparted by the unique microbiological conditions in which it is manufactured. The rock of the cave and the Brevibacterium linens bacteria which developed in it, the constant temperature and humidity, act on the cheeses produced here.

Brevibacterium linens is ubiquitously present on the human skin, where it causes foot odour. The same bacterium is also employed to ferment several cheeses such as Limburger, Port-Salut and Năsal. Its smell also attracts mosquitoes.

== Origin ==
Schilling János, an architect, purchased a farm in Năsal in the mid-19th century. He or his son, Schilling Ottó, started producing cheese in the farm cellars in the 19th century. The cheese became famous in Transylvania, and it was awarded a gold medal at the Paris World Expo. The farm was nationalised in 1948 and a smaller cheese factory was built in the village in 1954.

== Legend ==
As the legend goes, the village of Năsal was owned by a rich and cruel count. One day, some farmers ignored the commandments of the noble and took some pieces of his cheese, for their children. They hid the cheese in a cave near the Năsal village, and did not rush to go and take it. Weeks passed, and one day a villager went into the cave, convinced he would find the cheese rotten. to his surprise, he found it in good condition. The cheese had changed its colour to a reddish yellow, but the taste was very good, despite the smell. Finally, the count found out and punished the peasants. However, he kept the cheese from the cave, and began serving it to all his noble guests, proud of its exquisite taste and shortly thereafter began storing his cheeses in the cave.

== See also ==
- Napolact
