= Mucenici =

Christian feast day in Romania and Moldova

Mucenici is a Christian feast of the 40 Martyrs of Sebaste, a traditional holiday in Romania and Moldova. It coincides with the start of the agricultural year.

On the day of the martyrs (mucenici), in the popular belief, the tombs and the gates of Heaven are opened, and the housewives make, in honor of the Holy Martyrs, 40 coils called sfinti, mucenici or bradosi.

In Moldova, they have the shape of the number 8, a stylization of the human form, and are baked from Cozonac dough, then glazed with honey and sprinkled with walnuts.

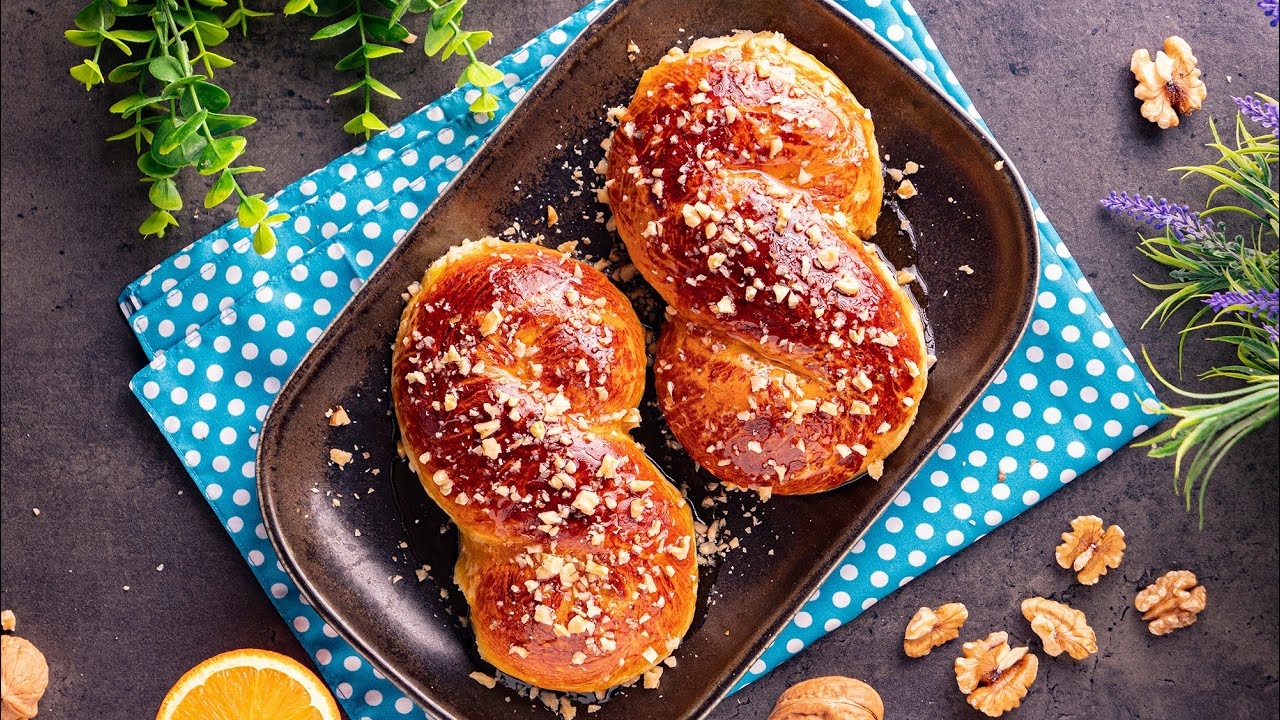
Mucenici with cracked walnut and honey

In Dobrogea, the same anthropomorphic form is preserved, but the martyrs are smaller and are boiled in water with sugar, cinnamon and walnuts, symbolizing the lake where the Holy Martyrs were thrown.

In Muntenia, in addition to the usual brados, there is a "Uitata pentru morti" (The forgotten dead) celebration, a larger martyr bread (considered to be blind), which children dance around the fire with in celebration of the dead who were forgotten during the year.

The customs of March 9 form a ritual scenario specific to the coming of a New Year: the preparation of ritual food (Saints, Saints, Bradoşi), spring cleaning, the ritual drunkenness attested by popular tradition, the opening of the tombs and gates of Heaven for the return of spirits among the living, lighting fires in courtyards and gardens, in front of the houses and in the field, the purification of people and cattle by sprinkling holy water, beating the earth with the mayors to drive away the cold and take out the heat, finding luck in the new year by preparing the Mucenici cake, harvesting honey and cutting the first vines.

== Food ==
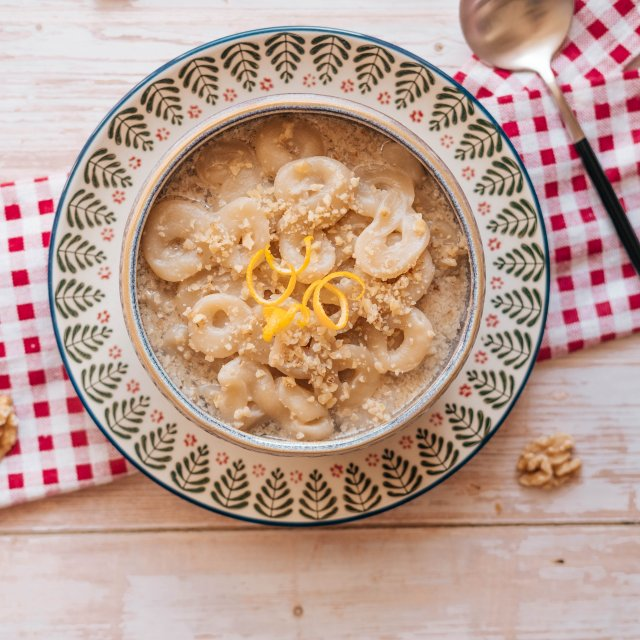
Mucenici prepared in Muntenian style

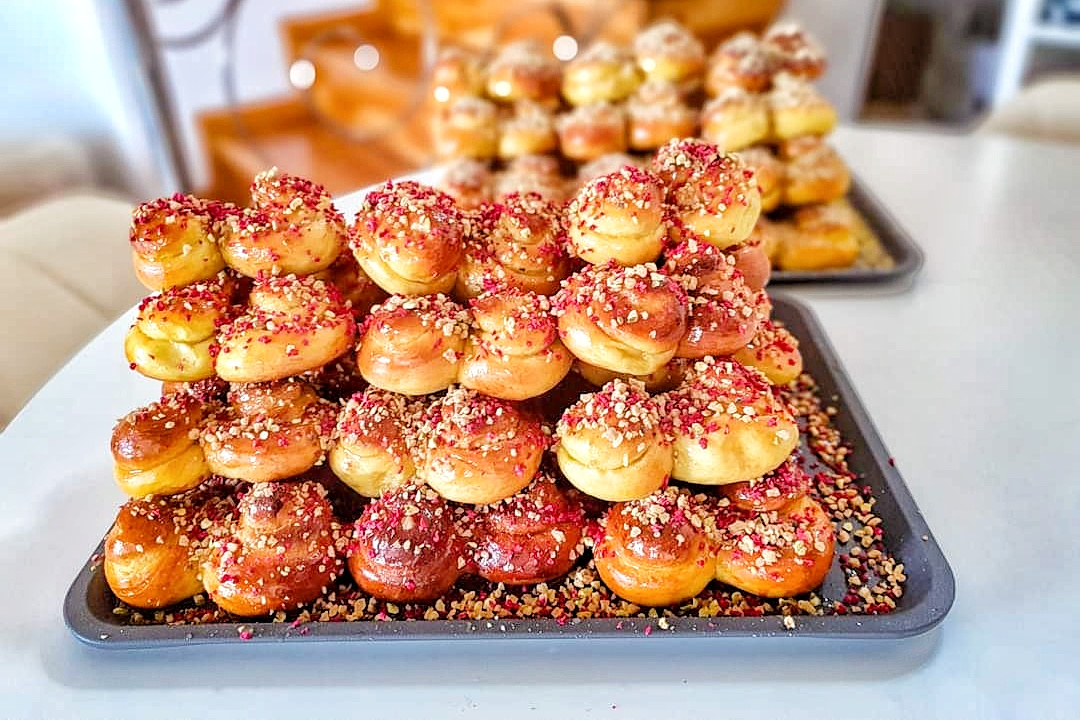
Mucenici prepared in Dobrogea style Mucenici prepared in Moldovian style

Their 8 shape is a symbol of infinity and union with the Cosmos, in alignment with the myth of the Heaven Gates opening.

== See also ==
- Sfințișori
