= Chorba =

Traditional soup

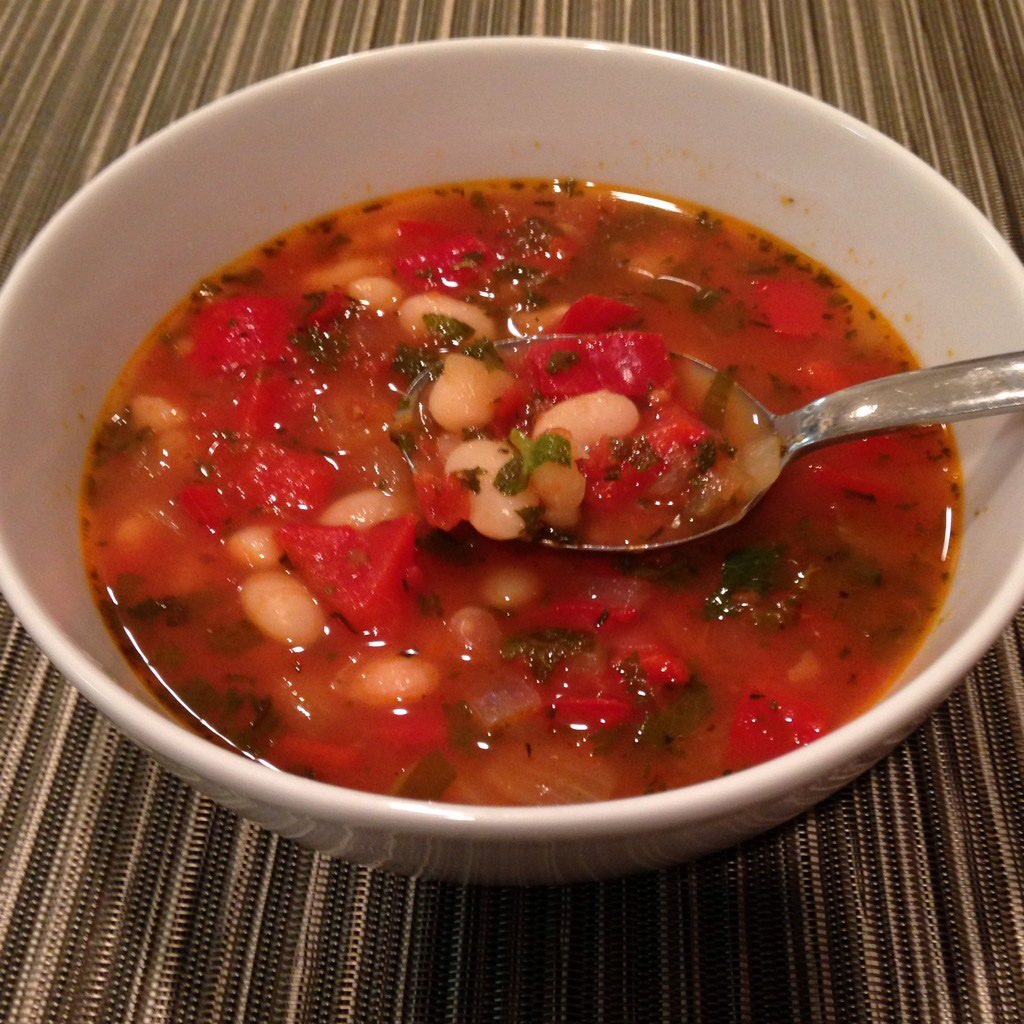
- Bulgarian bean chorba with tomatoes and red peppers.
- Alternative names: Ciorbă, shurbah, shorwa, čorba, çorba
- Type: Soup or stew
- Region or state: Algeria, Balkans, Central and Eastern Europe, Southeast Europe, Central Asia, North Africa, Arabia
- Main ingredients: Water, meat, beans، vegetables and legumes

Chorba, (/ˈtʃɔːrbə/ CHOR-bə; Turkish: [tʃɔɾˈba]) (Note: From Ottoman Turkish چوربا çorba.) shorwa, shurba, shurpa, shurbah or shorba (/ˈʃɔːrbə/ SHOR-bə) (Note: From Persian شوربا shōrbā [ʃoːɾˈbɑː], Iranian Persian: shurbā [ʃuːɹˈbɒː]) is a broad class of stews or rich soups found in national cuisines across North Africa, the Middle East, Iran, Turkey, Central and Eastern Europe, Central Asia, East Africa and South Asia. It is often prepared with added ingredients but is also served alone as a broth or with bread.

== Etymology ==
The word chorba in English and in many Balkan languages is a loan from Ottoman Turkish چوربا çorba, which itself is a loan from Persian شوربا šōrbā. The spelling shorba could be a direct loan into English from Persian or through a Central or South Asian intermediary.

The word is ultimately a compound of شور šōr meaning 'salty, brackish' and با bā meaning 'stew, gruel, spoon-meat'. The former is from Parthian 𐫢𐫇𐫡 šōr meaning 'salty', and the latter from Middle Persian *-bāg meaning 'gruel, spoon-meat'.

The etymology can be definitively tied to Persian through the cognate شورباج šōrabāj; in modern Persian, while شوربا šōrbā evolved to mean 'broth, stew', شورباج šōrabāj simply means 'soup'. It is typical for Middle Persian word-final 𐭪 g to either change to ج j or be dropped altogether in Modern Persian.

The dialectal Arabic word شوربة šūrba also a loan from Persian while شربة šurba is a phono-semantic matching that occurred during the loaning of the word into Arabic and is etymologically tied to شرب šariba meaning 'to drink'.

Chorba is also called shorba (Amharic: ሾርባ), sho'rva (Uzbek: шўрва), shorwa (Pashto: شوروا), chorba (Bulgarian: чорба), čorba (Serbo-Croatian Cyrillic: чорба), shurbad (Somali), ciorbă (Romanian), shurpa (Russian: шурпа), csorba (Hungarian, shorpa (Uyghur: شورپا / шорпа), çorba (Turkish), shorpo (Kyrgyz: шорпо), sorpa (Kazakh: сорпа) and shorba in (Hindustani: شوربہ / शोरबा). In the Indian subcontinent, the term shirwā is commonly used to mean gravy. It is a Mughlai dish and it also has vegetarian forms.

== Types ==
Shorwa is a traditional Afghan dish which is a simple dish which is usually mixed with bread on the dastarkhān. It is a long process; a pressure-cooker is usually used to reduce the process to 2 hours. The main ingredients for shorwa are potatoes, beans and meat. It is commonly served with Afghan bread.

In Moldova and Romania “ciorbă” is a generic term for a soup.

== Gallery ==
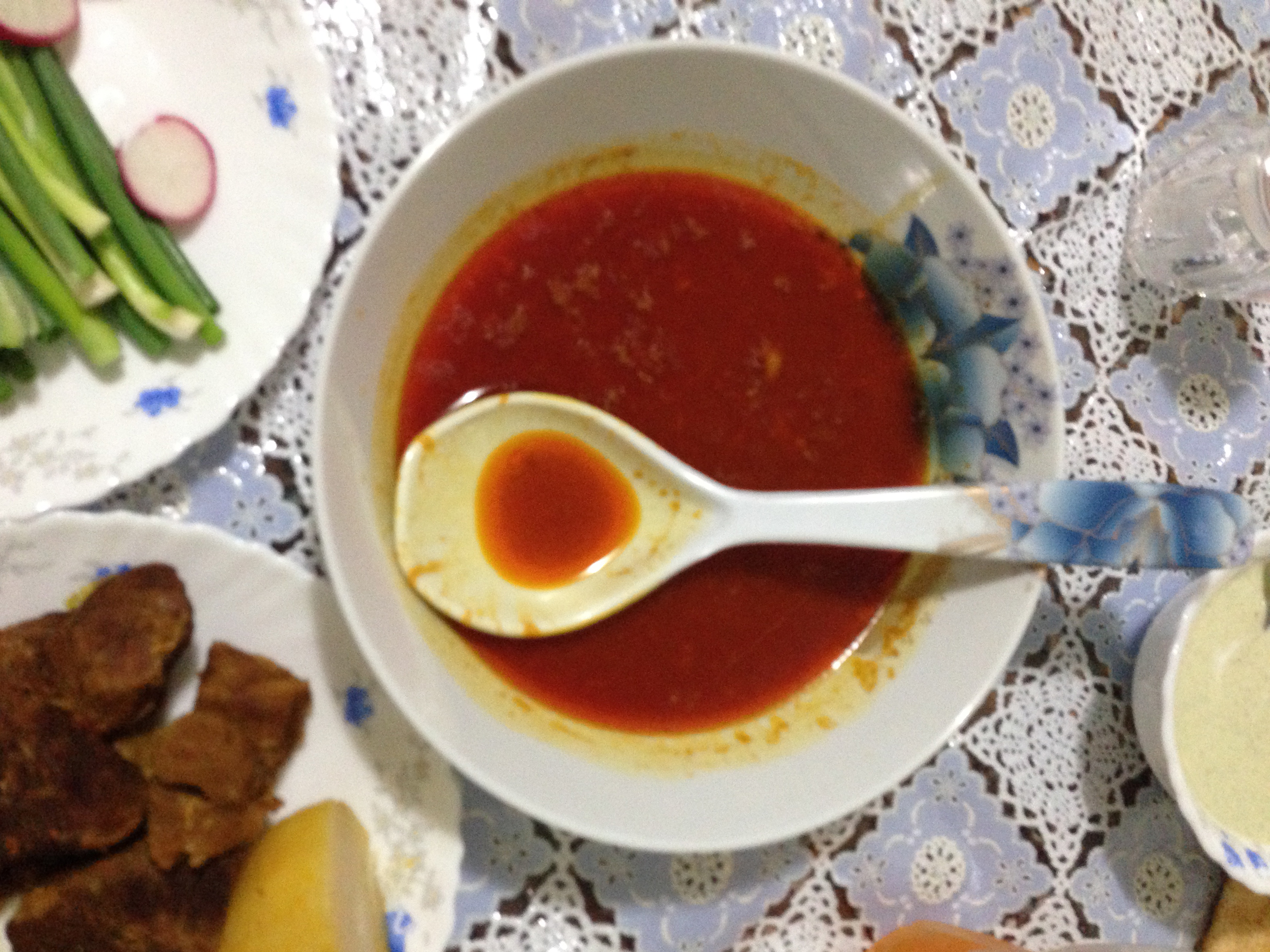
Traditional Afghan shorwa

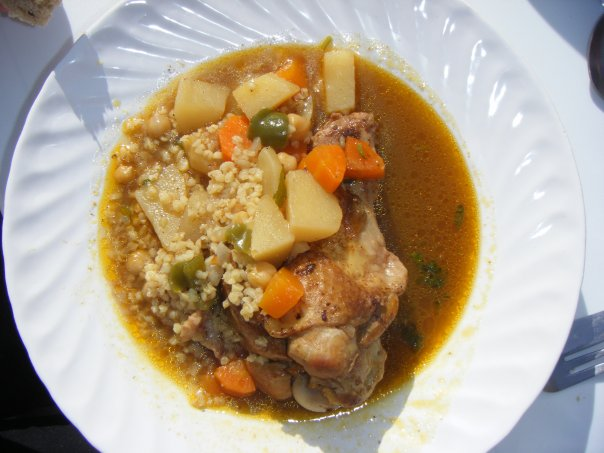
Algerian chorba

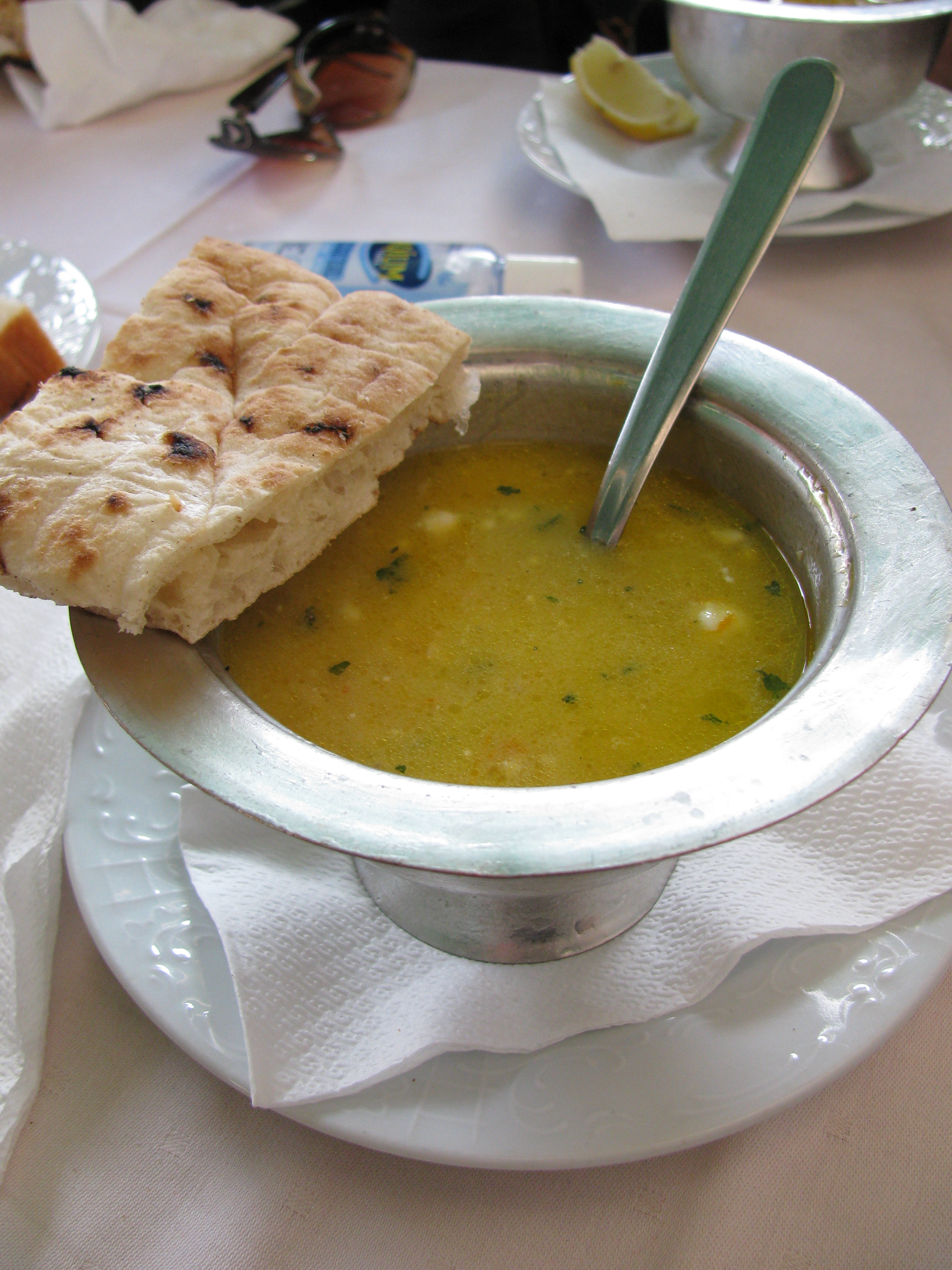
Bosnian begova čorba and somun bread

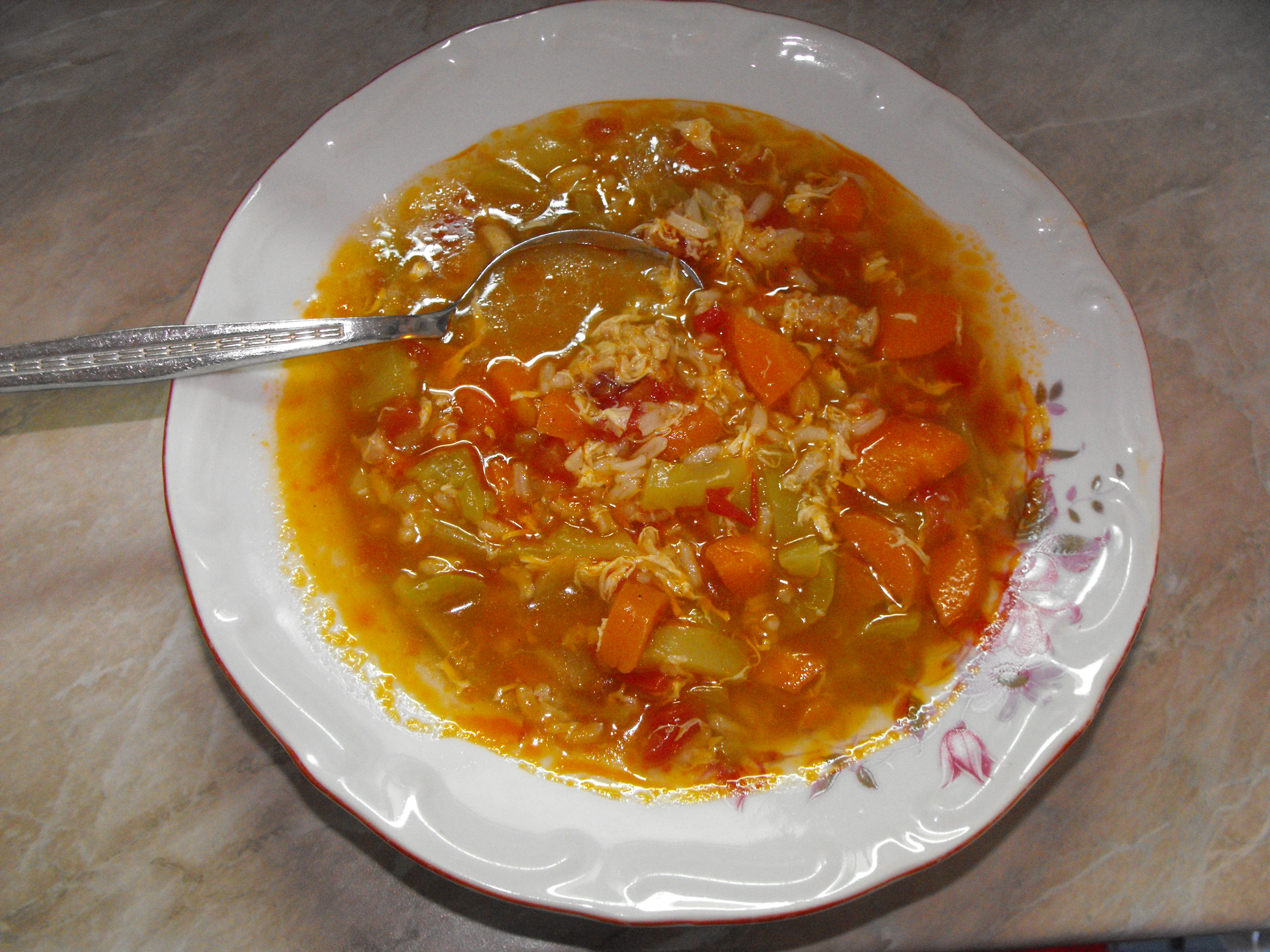
Bulgarian Kurban chorba

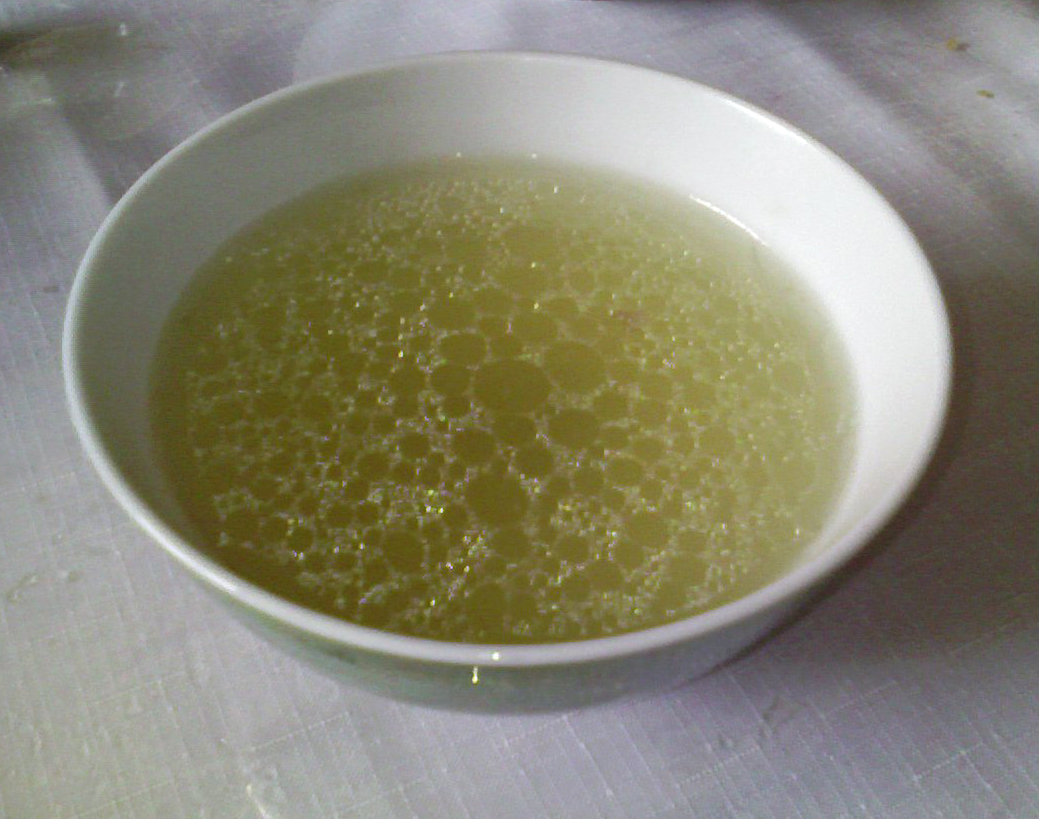
Kyrgyz shorpo

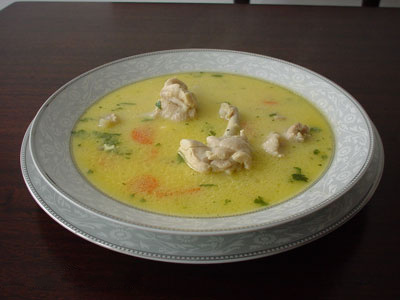
Serbian chicken čorba

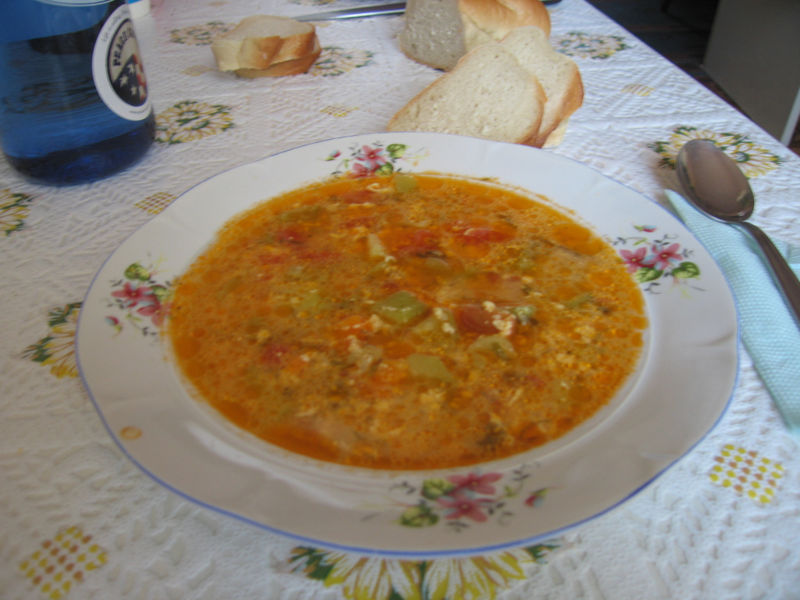
Romanian ciorbă

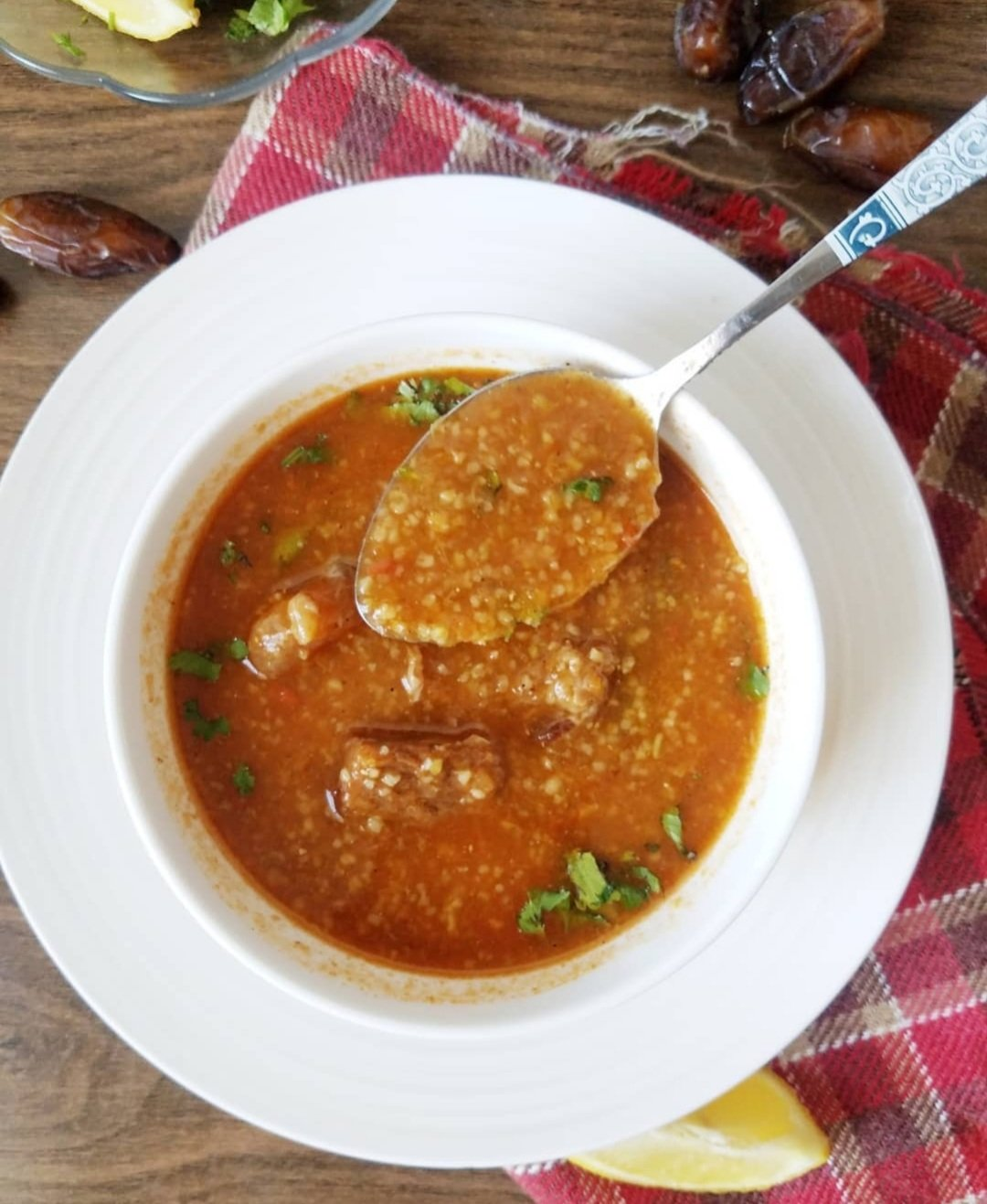
Algerian chorba frik

== See also ==
- List of soups
- List of stews
