= Sfințișori =

Traditional pastries from Romania and Moldova

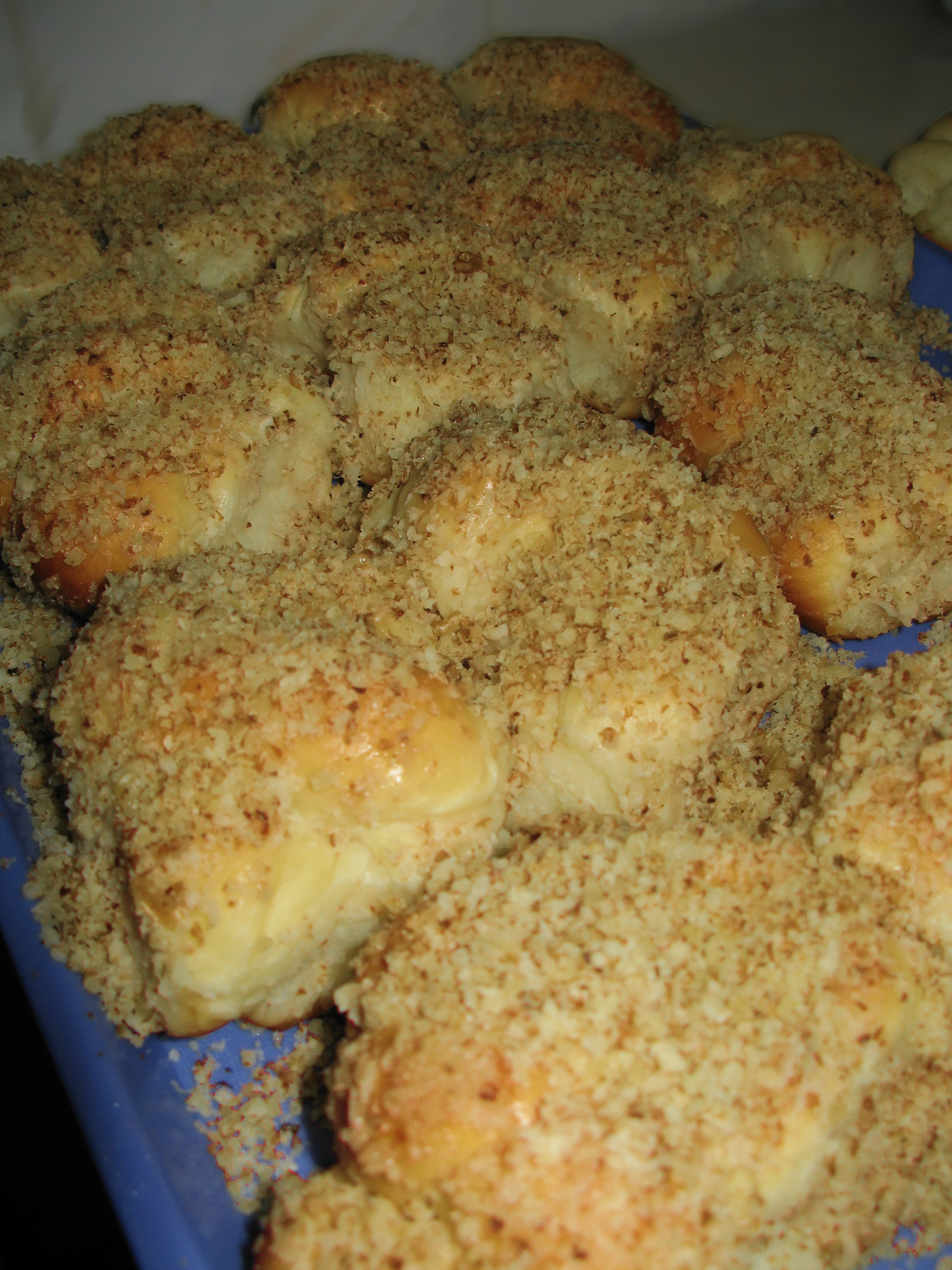
Sfințișori

Sfințișori (Little saints) or mucenici moldovenești (Moldavian martyrs), are traditional pastries from Romania and Moldova made to commemorate on March 9 (or March 22, as per Julian calendar), the Christian feast of the 40 Martyrs of Sebaste, a traditional holiday in Romania and Moldova.

== Preparation ==
In the historical region of Moldavia, Sfințișori were dough in large shapes of the figure 8, baked, then smeared with honey and walnuts.

== Variants ==
In the Muntenia and Dobruja regions of Romania, similar traditional pastries are named mucenici. The dough is smaller and boiled in water with sugar, cinnamon and crushed nuts, symbolizing the lake where the Martyrs were cast.

== See also ==
- Mucenici
- List of pastries
