= Zmeurată =

Alcoholic beverage made from raspberry

Zmeurată (Romanian pronunciation: [zme.uˈratə]) is a Romanian alcoholic beverage produced from Raspberry (zmeură in Romanian), sugar and alcohol.
