= Secărică =

Romanian alcoholic beverage

Secărică is a Romanian alcoholic beverage produced from caraway seed (secăreá in Romanian), sugar and alcohol.
