= Tobă =

Thick sausage made with pork

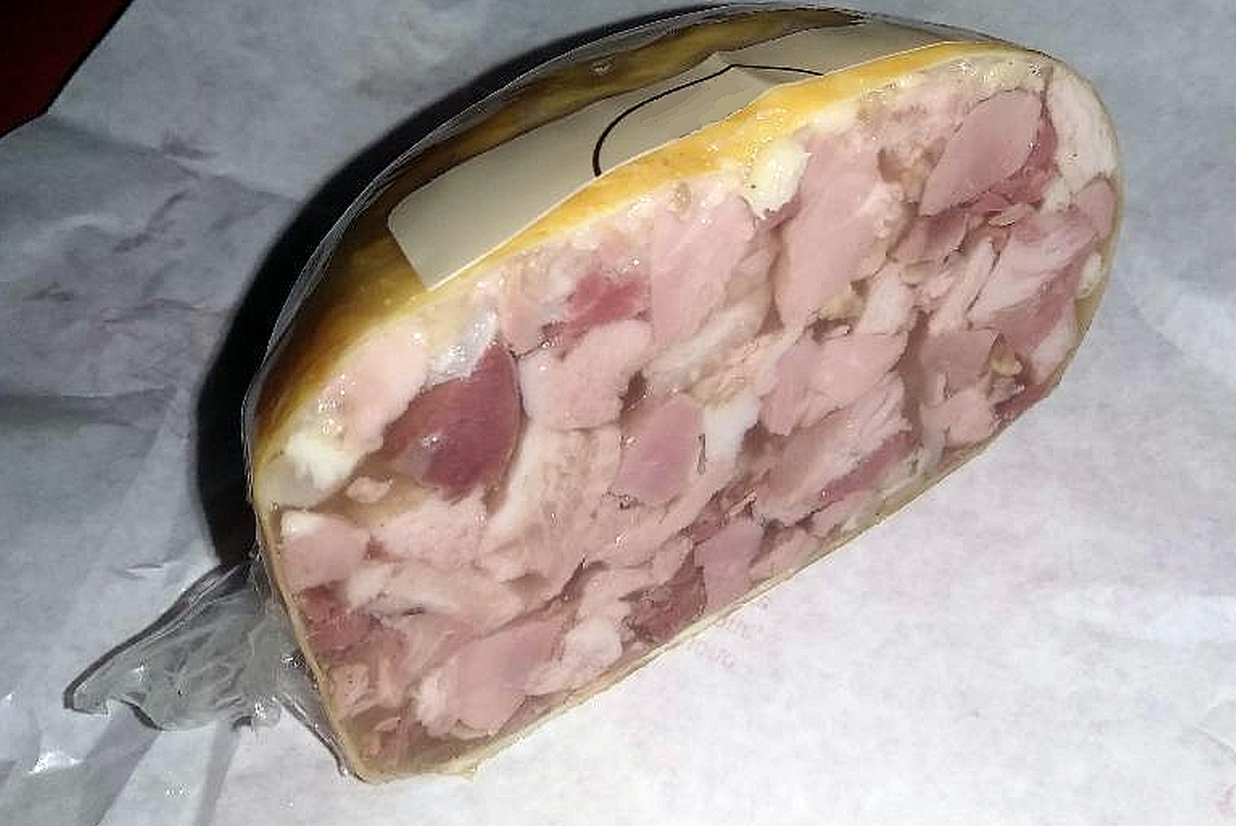
- A tobă
- Alternative names: Caș de cap de porc
- Course: Entrée; Main course
- Region or state: Romania
- Serving temperature: Cold
- Main ingredients: Pork

Tobă, "caș de cap de porc" (which means "pig head cheese"), is a kind of head cheese, a traditional Romanian delicatessen item which looks like a wide sausage, around four inches in diameter, usually using a pig's stomach, stuffed with pork jelly, liver, and skin suspended in aspic. It is similar to the Hungarian Disznófősajt (which means "pig head cheese").
