= Leopard 2 =

German main battle tank

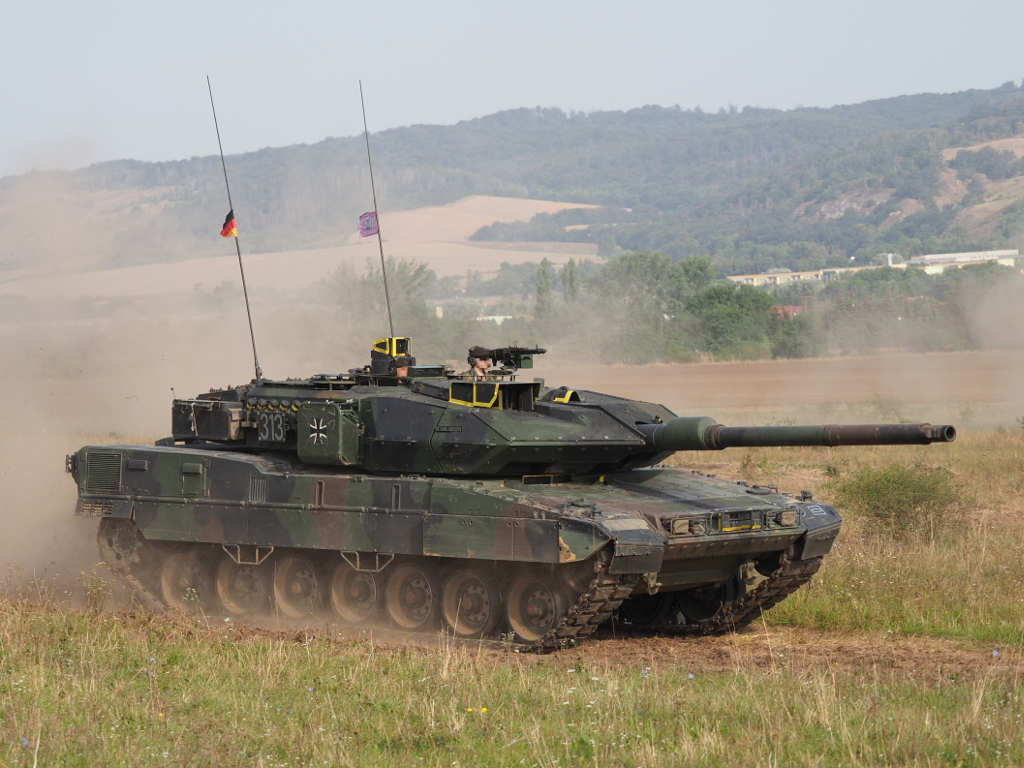
- A German Leopard 2A7V
- Type: Main battle tank
- Place of origin: West Germany

Service history
- In service: 1979–present
- Used by: See Operators
- Wars: Kosovo War; Prizren incident; War in Afghanistan; Syrian Civil War; Operation Euphrates Shield; Russo-Ukrainian War; Russian invasion of Ukraine

Production history
- Designer: KraussMaffei
- Designed: 1970s
- Manufacturer: KraussMaffei; Maschinenbau Kiel; Rheinmetall; Santa Bárbara Sistemas; Hägglunds AB; Contraves; Hellenic Vehicle Industry
- Unit cost: 2A6 (secondhand): €5.74 million (FY 2007); 2A7+: €13–15 million (FY 2014); 2A8: €29 million (2023)
- Produced: 1979–present
- No. built: 3,600
- Variants: See Variants

Specifications
- Mass: 2A4: 55.2 tonnes (60.8 short tons); 2A5: 59.5 tonnes (65.6 short tons); 2A6: 62.3 tonnes (68.7 short tons); 2A7V: 66.5 tonnes (73.3 short tons)
- Length: 2A4: 9.97 metres (32.7 feet) (gun forward); 2A6: 10.97 metres (36.0 feet)
- Width: 2A4: 3.7 metres (12 feet); 2A6: 3.75 m (12.3 ft)
- Height: 2A4: 2.8 metres (9.2 feet); 2A6: 3 m (9.8 ft)
- Crew: 4
- Armor: 2A6: 3rd generation composite; including high-hardness steel, tungsten and plastic filler with ceramic component.
- Main armament: 1 × Rh-120 L/44 120 mm or Rh-120 L/55 120 mm Rheinmetall Rh-120 (42 rounds)
- Secondary armament: 2 × 7.62 mm MG3A1 or 2 × 7.62 mm FN MAG (4,750 rounds)
- Engine: MTU MB 873 Ka-501 liquid-cooled V12 twin-turbo diesel engine 1,100 kW (1,500 hp) at 2,600 rpm
- Power/weight: 2A6: 17.8 kW/t (24.2 PS/t); 2A7V: 16.6 kW/t (22.6 PS/t)
- Transmission: Renk HSWL 354
- Suspension: Torsion bar suspension
- Fuel capacity: 1,200 litres (264 imperial gallons; 317 US gallons)
- Operational range: Road: 340 km (210 mi); Cross country: 220 km (140 mi); Average: 280 km (170 mi)
- Maximum speed: 70 km/h (43 mph)

The Leopard 2 is a third generation German main battle tank (MBT). Developed by Krauss-Maffei in the 1970s, the tank entered service in 1979 and replaced the earlier Leopard 1 as the main battle tank of the West German army. Various iterations of the Leopard 2 continue to be operated by the armed forces of Germany, as well as 13 other European countries, and several non-European countries, including Canada, Chile, Indonesia, and Singapore. Some operating countries have licensed the Leopard 2 design for local production and domestic development.

There are two main development tranches of the Leopard 2. The first encompasses tanks produced up to the Leopard 2A4 standard and are characterised by their vertically faced turret armour. The second tranche, from Leopard 2A5 onwards, has an angled, arrow-shaped, turret appliqué armour, together with other improvements. The main armament of all Leopard 2 tanks is a smoothbore 120 mm cannon made by Rheinmetall. This is operated with a digital fire control system, laser rangefinder, and advanced night vision and sighting equipment. The tank is powered by a V12 twin-turbo diesel engine made by MTU Friedrichshafen.

In the 1990s, the Leopard 2 was used by the German Army on peacekeeping operations in Kosovo. In the 2000s, Dutch, Danish and Canadian forces deployed their Leopard 2 tanks in the War in Afghanistan as part of their contribution to the International Security Assistance Force. In the 2010s, Turkish Leopard 2 tanks saw action in Syria. Since 2023, Ukrainian Leopard 2 tanks are seeing action in the Russo-Ukrainian War.

== History ==
=== Development ===
Even as the Leopard 1 was entering service, the West German military was interested in producing an improved tank in the next decade. This resulted in the start of the MBT-70 development in cooperation with the United States beginning in 1963. By 1967 it had become questionable whether the MBT-70 would enter service at any time in the foreseeable future. Therefore, the West German government issued the order to research future upgrade options for the Leopard 1 to the German company Porsche in 1967.

This study was named vergoldeter Leopard (Gilded Leopard) and focused on incorporating advanced technology into the Leopard design. The projected upgrades added an autoloader, a coaxial autocannon and an independent commander's periscope. The anti-air machine gun could be operated from inside the vehicle and a TV surveillance camera was mounted on an extendable mast. The shape of the turret and hull was optimised using cast steel armour, while the suspension, transmission, and engine exhaust vents were improved.

==== Prototype development ====
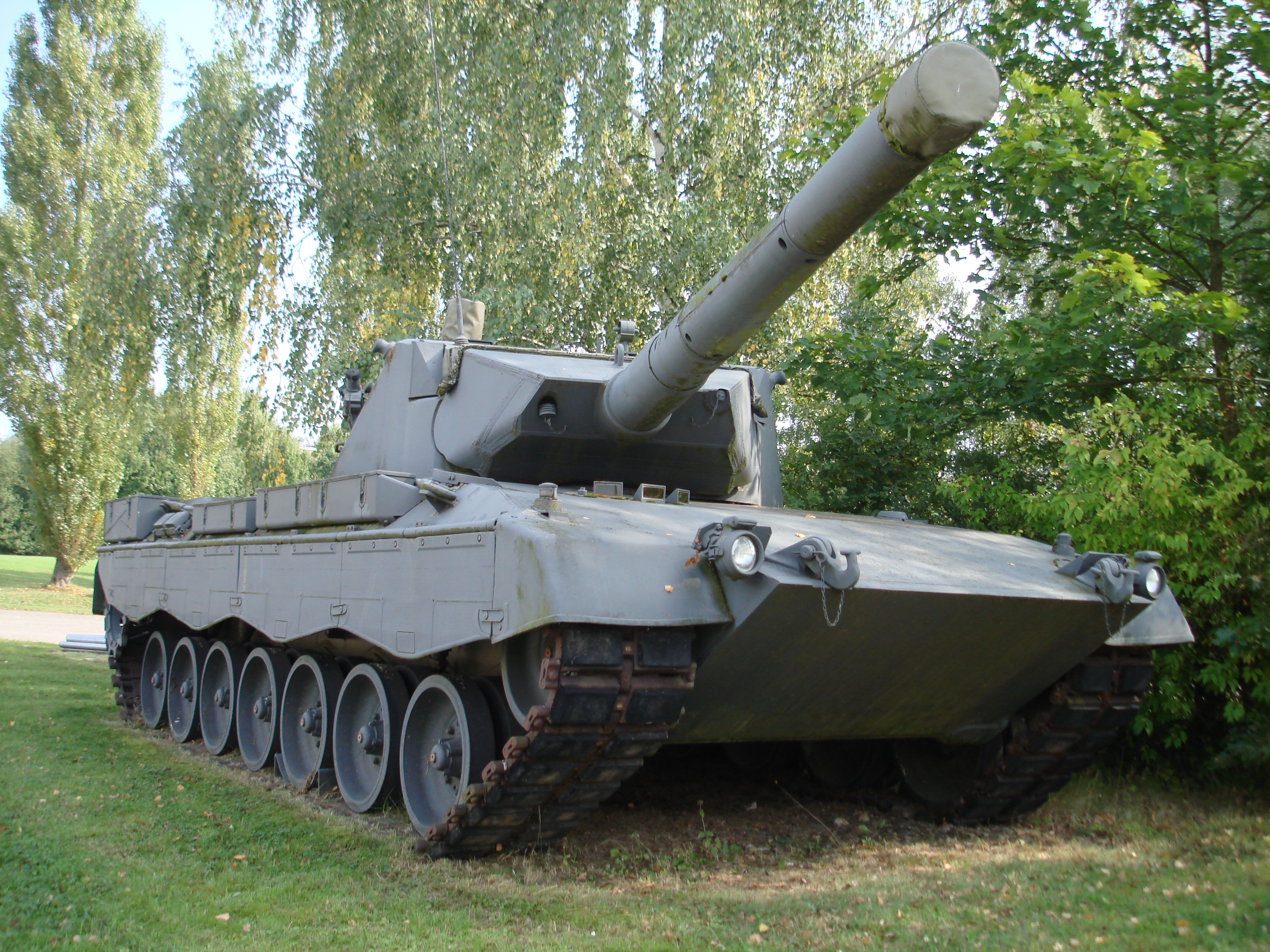
A Leopard 2 PT15 with 105 mm smoothbore gun

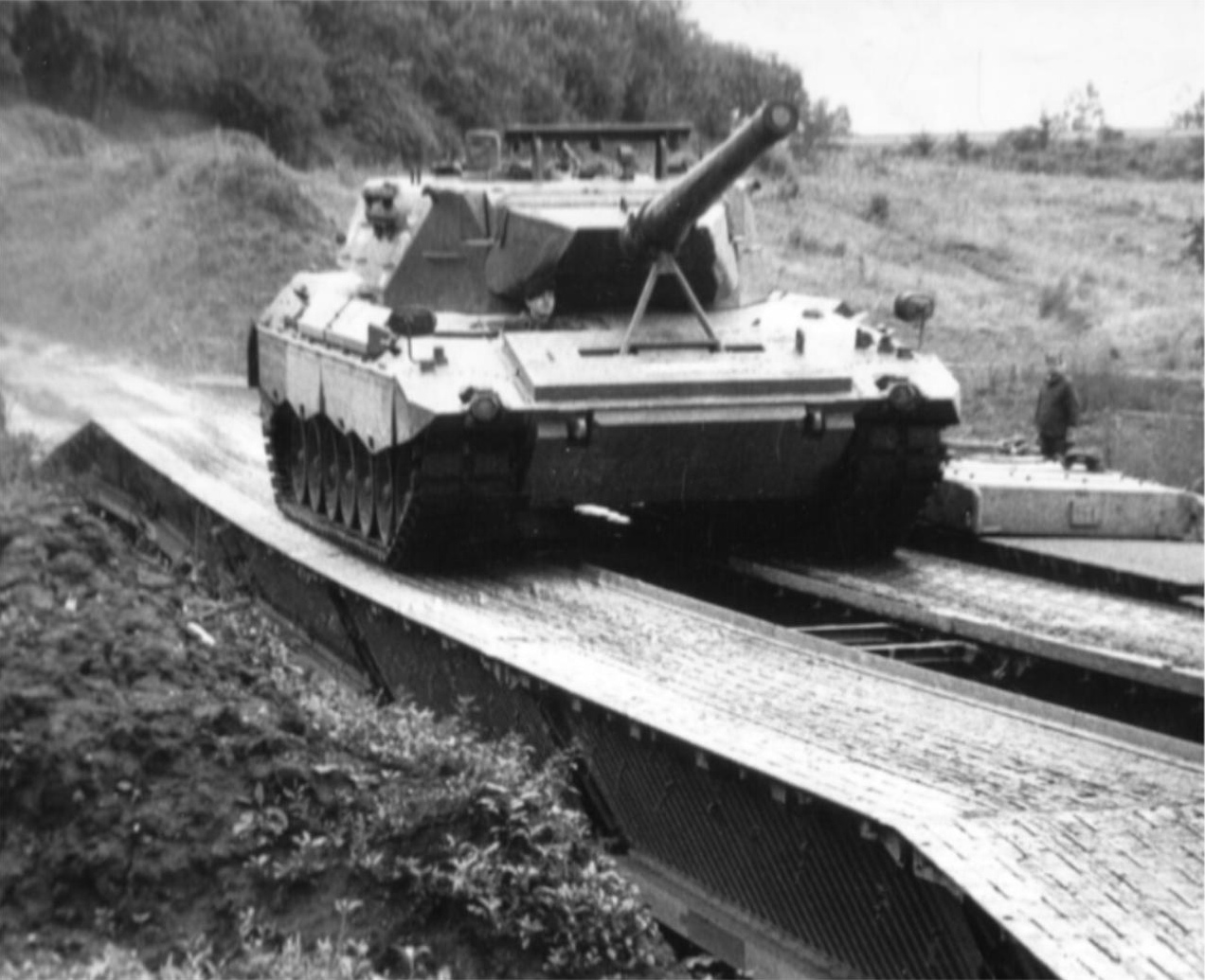
A Leopard 2 prototype (1983)

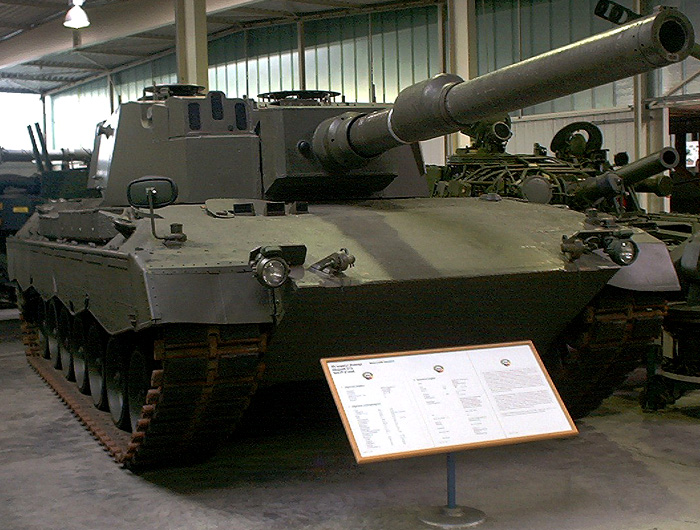
The Leopard 2 T14 mod. with the modified turret housing composite armour

Following the end of the Gilded Leopard study in 1967, the West German government decided to focus on the Experimentalentwicklung (experimental development) in a feasibility study and to develop new components for upgrading the Leopard 1 and for use on a future main battle tank programme. At first 25 million DM were invested, but after the industry came to the conclusion that with such a low budget the development of the two projected testbeds was not possible, a total of 30 to 32 million DM was invested. The experimental development was contracted to the company Krauss-Maffei, but with the obligation to cooperate with Porsche for the development of the chassis and with Wegmann for the development of the turret.

Two prototypes with different components were built with the aim of improving the Leopard 1 to match the firepower requirements of the MBT-70. A high first-hit probability at ranges of 2,000 metres (6,600 ft) and the ability to accurately engage targets on the move using a computerised fire control system were the main goals of the experimental development. The resulting vehicles were nicknamed Keiler ("tusker"). Two prototypes (ET 01 and ET 02) of the Keiler were built in 1969 and 1970, both of them being powered by the MB 872 engine.

The MBT-70 was a revolutionary design, but after large cost overruns and technological problems, Germany withdrew from the project in 1969. After unsuccessful attempts at saving the MBT-70 by conceptual changes in order to eliminate the biggest issue—the driver being seated in the turret—it became clear in late 1969 that Germany would stop the bi-national development. The assistant secretary of the military procurement division of the German Ministry of Defence suggested reusing as many technologies developed for the MBT-70 as possible in a further programme, which was nicknamed Eber ("boar") due to his being named Eberhardt. The Eber used a modified MBT-70 turret and hull, with the driver being seated in the hull. Only a wooden mock-up was made.

One year later, a choice was made to continue the development based on the earlier Keiler project of the late 1960s, instead of finishing the development of the Eber. In 1971, the name of the design was determined as Leopard 2 with the original Leopard retroactively becoming the Leopard 1, and Paul-Werner Krapke became the project officer of the Leopard 2 program. Originally two versions were projected: the gun-armed Leopard 2K and the Leopard 2FK, which would be armed with the XM150 gun/launcher weapon of the MBT-70.

In 1971, 17 prototypes were ordered but only 16 hulls were built as the production of hull PT12 was cancelled. Ten were ordered initially before another seven were ordered. The 17 turrets were designated T1 to T17, and the hulls were designated PT1 to PT11 and PT13 to PT17. To test a larger number of components and concepts, each prototype was fitted with components not found on the other prototypes. Ten of the turrets were equipped with 105 mm (4.1 in) smoothbore guns and the other seven prototypes were equipped with a 120 mm (4.7 in) smoothbore gun.

Hulls PT11 and PT17 were fitted with a hydropneumatic suspension based on the MBT-70 design. The running gears of these two hulls had only six road wheels. Different types of auxiliary power units (APUs) were mounted in the prototypes. All turrets were equipped with a machine gun for air defence, except the turret mounted on PT11, where a 20 mm (0.79 in) remotely operated autocannon was mounted. With the exception of hulls PT07, PT09, PT15, and PT17, all prototypes used the MB 873 engine. The road wheels were taken from the MBT-70 and the return rollers from the Leopard 1. The prototypes were designed with a projected weight of MLC50, which equals approximately 47.5 tonnes (46.7 long tons; 52.4 short tons). The welded turret utilised spaced armour formed by two steel plates. The prototypes were equipped with an EMES-12 optical rangefinder and fire control system, which later was adopted on the Leopard 1A4.

In mid-1973 a new turret was designed by Wegmann saving 1.5 tonnes (1.7 short tons) in weight. It was nicknamed the Spitzmaus-Turm (shrew turret) due to the highly sloped front. This design was only possible with the new EMES-13 optical rangefinder, which required a base length of only 350 millimetres (14 in) instead of the previous 1,720 millimetres (68 in). Based on experiences in the Yom Kippur War, a higher level of protection than the prototypes' heavily sloped spaced armour was demanded in late 1973 and the Spitzmaus-Turm was never produced.

The weight limit was increased from MLC50 to MLC60, which equals approximately 55 tonnes (54 long tons; 61 short tons). The T14 turret was modified to test a new armour configuration, taking on a blockier-looking appearance as a result of using vertical modules of spaced multilayer armour. It was also used to test the new EMES-13 optical rangefinder. The modified T14 turret was designated T14 mod. and was fitted with a fully electric turret drive and stabilisation system, which was developed jointly by General Electric and AEG Telefunken.

==== U.S. evaluation of Leopard 2AV and XM1 Abrams ====
In July 1973 the West German Federal Minister of Defense Georg Leber and his U.S. counterpart James R. Schlesinger agreed upon a higher degree of standardisation in main battle tanks being favourable to NATO. By integrating components already fully developed by West German companies for the Leopard 2, the costs of the XM1 Abrams, U.S. prototype tank developed after the MBT-70, could be reduced. A West German commission was sent to the U.S. to evaluate the harmonisation of components between the XM1 and Leopard 2. However, under U.S. law it was not possible for a public bidder to interfere in a procurement tender after a contract with intention of profits and deadline was awarded to private sector companies.

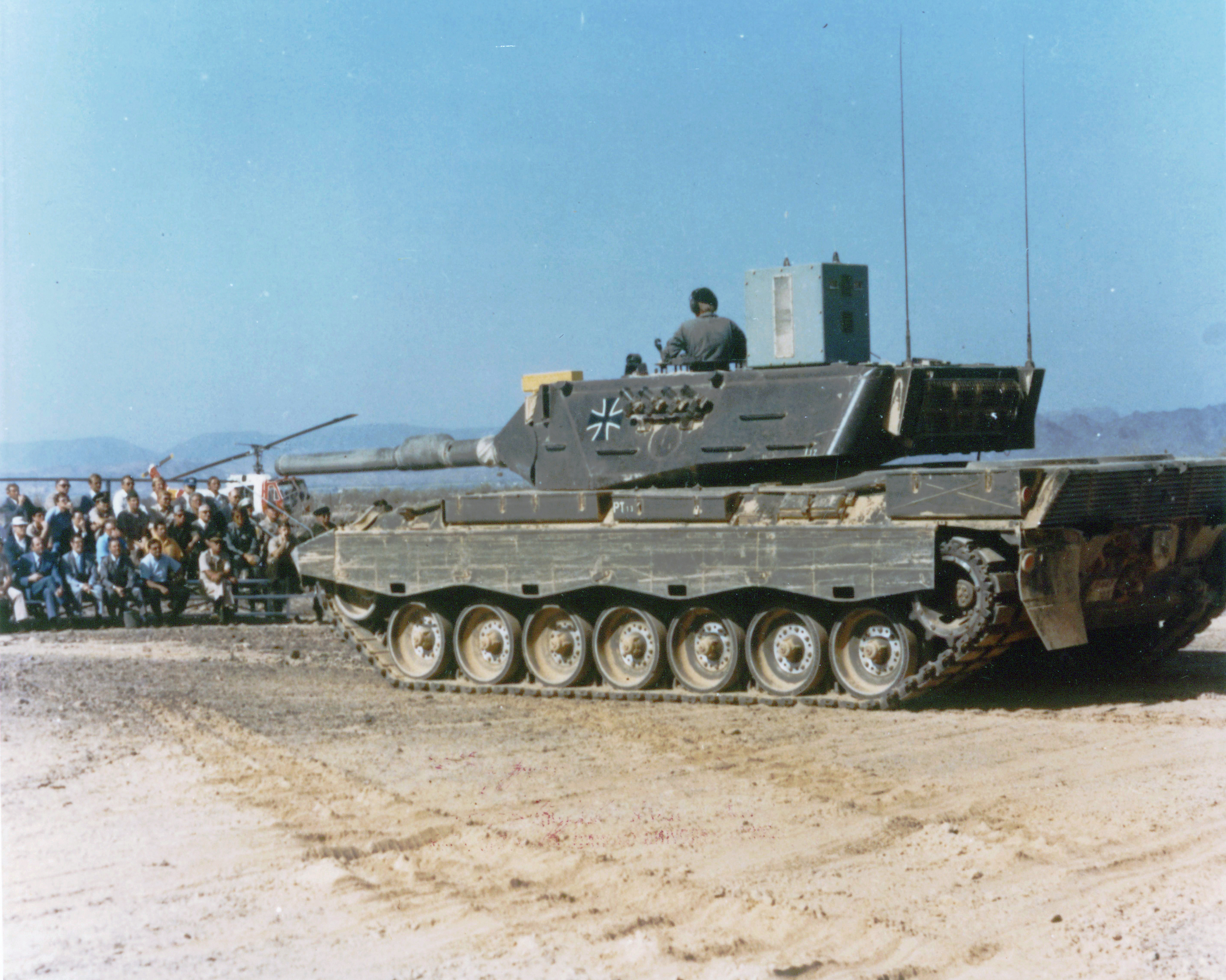
Leopard 2 prototype tested at the Yuma Proving Ground in September 1975

As a result, the modification of the Leopard 2 prototypes in order to meet the U.S. Army requirements was investigated. Following a number of further talks, a memorandum of understanding (MoU) was signed on December 11, 1974, between West Germany and the U.S., which declared that a modified version of the Leopard 2 should be trialed by the U.S. against their XM1 prototypes, after the U.S. had bought and investigated prototype PT07 in 1973. The MoU obliged the Federal Republic of Germany to send a complete prototype, a hull, a vehicle for ballistic tests and a number of special ballistic parts to the US.,. where they would be put through US testing procedures for no additional costs.

The Leopard 2AV (austere version) was based on the experiences of the previous Leopard 2 development. It was created in order to meet the U.S. requirements and the latest protection requirements of the West German MoD. The T14 mod turret was used as the base for the Leopard 2AV's turret, but meeting the required level of protection for the hull required several attempts until the final ballistic trials on 23 to 26 June 1976. Following the U.S. preference of laser rangefinders, the turret of prototype PT19 was fitted with a laser rangefinder developed together with the American company Hughes.

In comparison with the earlier Leopard 2 prototypes, the fire control system was simplified by replacing the EMES-12 optical rangefinder and removing the crosswind sensor, the air pressure and temperature sensors, the powder temperature sensor, the PERI R12 commander sight with IR searchlight, the short-range grenade launcher for use against infantry, the retractable searchlight, the spotlight, the retractable passive night vision sight, the APU and the mechanical loading assistant.

Due to the design and production of the Leopard 2AV taking more time than expected, the shipment to North America and subsequent U.S. evaluation was delayed. Thus, it was not possible to test the Leopard 2AV before 1 September 1976. Despite West Germany's wish that the Leopard 2AV and the XM1 prototypes would be evaluated at the same time, the U.S. Army decided not to wait for the Leopard 2AV and tested the XM1 prototypes from Chrysler and General Motors beforehand.

Two new prototype hulls and three turrets were shipped to the US: PT20 mounting a 105 mm (4.1 in) rifled L7 gun and a Hughes fire control system, PT19 with the same fire control system but able to swap out the gun for the 120 mm (4.7 in) Rheinmetall smoothbore gun, and the PT21 fitted with the Krupp Atlas Elektronik EMES-13 fire control system and the 120 mm (4.7 in) Rheinmetall gun. The Leopard 2AV fully met the U.S. requirements. A study made by the U.S. FMC Corporation showed that it was possible to produce the Leopard 2AV under license in North America without exceeding the cost limits set by the U.S. Army. Before the trials were finished, it was decided that instead of the U.S. Army possibly adopting the Leopard 2AV, the focus was shifted to the possibilities of common components between the two tanks. FMC, after having acquired the licenses for the production of the Leopard 2AV, decided not to submit a technical proposal, as they saw little to no chance for the U.S. Army adopting a vehicle not developed in the US.

The US Army evaluation showed that on the XM1 a larger portion of the tank's surface was covered by special armour (composite armour arrays) than on the Leopard 2AV. Differences in armour protection were attributed to the different perceptions of the expected threats and the haste in which the Leopard 2AV was designed to accommodate special armour. On mobility trials the Leopard 2AV performed equal to better than the XM1 prototypes. The AGT-1500 turbine engine proved to consume about 50% more fuel and the Diehl tracks had a higher endurance, while the tracks used on the XM1 prototypes failed to meet the Army's requirements. The heat signature of the MTU diesel engine was much lower. The fire control system and the sights of the Leopard 2 were considered to be better and the 120 mm (4.7 in) gun proved to be superior. The projected production costs for one XM1 tank were US$728,000 in 1976 ($4.12 million in 2025), and the costs for one Leopard 2AV were US$56,000 higher ($316,842 in 2025).

After the U.S. evaluation of the Leopard 2AV and the U.S. Army's decision to opt for the XM1 Abrams, both U.S. and West German sources blamed the other side. U.S. Army test officials discovered that the PT19 Leopard 2AV prototype used for mobility trials did not contain special armour. (Note: According to the House Armed Services Subcommittee on Armed Services Investigations, after knocking on the PT19 Leopard 2AV prototype, a hollow sound was heard by Colonel Robert J. Sunell. West German Colonel Franz Kettman acknowledged that PT19 was not fitted with any special armor. The American estimated that with the special armor the 105 mm (4.1 in) gun Leopard 2AV would have weighed 63.2 short tons (57.3 t) instead of 59.6 short tons (54.1 t), calling into question the data collected during mobility testing.)

In West Germany, the test conditions were criticised for being unrealistic and favouring the XM1. Instead of using actual performance data, the calculated hypothetical acceleration was used. The XM1 was found to have a slightly higher rate of fire despite having internal layouts similar to the Leopard 2AV because the XM1 prototypes were manned by professional crews, while the Leopard 2AV had to be manned by conscripts in order to prove that the Leopard 2AV was not too complicated. Firing on the move was demonstrated on flat tracks, which nullified the better stabilisation systems of the Leopard 2AV.

West Germany later withdrew its tank from consideration.

==== Series production ====
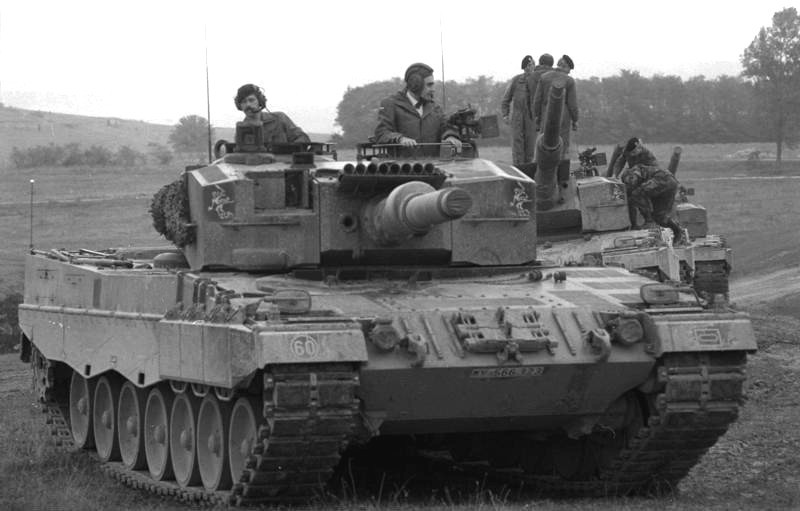
Leopard 2 tanks during a manoeuvre in 1986

The decision to put the Leopard 2 tank in production for the West German army was made after a study was undertaken, which showed that adopting the Leopard 2 model would result in a greater combat potential of the West German army than producing more Leopard 1A4 tanks or developing an improved version of the Leopard 1A4 with 105/120 mm smoothbore gun, improved armour protection, a new fire control system and a 890 kilowatts (1,190 hp) or 1,100 kilowatts (1,500 hp) engine. Various changes were applied to the Leopard 2 design before the series production started in 1979. The engine, transmission, and suspension were slightly modified and improved. The ballistic protection of the turret and hull was improved and weak spots were eliminated.

The turret bustle containing the ready ammunition racks and the hydraulic system was separated from the crew compartment and fitted with blowout panels. The development of several new components was introduced to the Leopard 2 during the Leopard 2AV development and after the US testing was completed. For the series version, the Hughes-designed laser rangefinder made with US Common Modules was chosen over the passive EMES-13 rangefinder. The EMES-13 system was considered to be the superior solution, but the Hughes system was cheaper and fully developed.

The West German company Krupp-Atlas-Elektronik acquired the licence of the Hughes design and modified it to meet the needs of the West German army. The modified rangefinder received the designation EMES-15. The installation of the US AGT-1500 turbine engine in the Leopard 2 was tested by MaK. The AGT-1500 was from the United States and required deep modifications to the Leopard 2's chassis. However, driving tests at the WTD 41 revealed a number of drawbacks such as high fuel consumption and the poor performance of the transmission including the brakes. This project was thus terminated.

In January 1977 Germany ordered a small pre-series of three hulls and two turrets which were delivered in 1978. These vehicles had increased armour protection on the front of the hull. One of the hulls was fitted with the earlier T21 turret and was used by the German army school in Munster for troop trials until 1979. In September 1977, 1,800 Leopard 2 tanks were ordered, to be produced in five batches. The main contractor was Krauss-Maffei, but Maschinenbau Kiel (MaK) was awarded a contract for producing 45% of the tanks. The first batch consisted of 380 tanks. The delivery of six tanks was scheduled for 1979, 114 for 1980, 180 for 1981, and 300 tanks each following year.

The first series-production tank was delivered on 25 October 1979. By 1982, all of the first batch of 380 Leopard 2 tanks had been completed. 209 were built by Krauss-Maffei (chassis no. 10001 to 10210) and 171 by MaK (chassis no. 20001 to 20172). The first production tanks were fitted with the PzB-200 image intensifier due to production shortages of the new thermal night-sight system, which was later retrofitted to the earlier models. After the original five batches, three further batches of Leopard 2 tanks were ordered, increasing the number of Leopard 2 tanks ordered by West Germany to a total of 2,125. The sixth batch was ordered in June 1987 and consisted of 150 tanks, which were produced between January 1988 and May 1989. The seventh batch of 100 tanks was produced between May 1988 and April 1990. The last batch for the new unified German army totaling 75 tanks was produced from January 1991 to March 1992.

During its production run during the Cold War, 16 Leopard 2 tanks were being produced per month. The vehicles were produced at a slower rate in the following decades, however KMW still retained the capacity to return to such manufacturing levels should they need to be made again at a higher rate and supply chains are able to deliver sufficient materials.

==== Further improvements ====
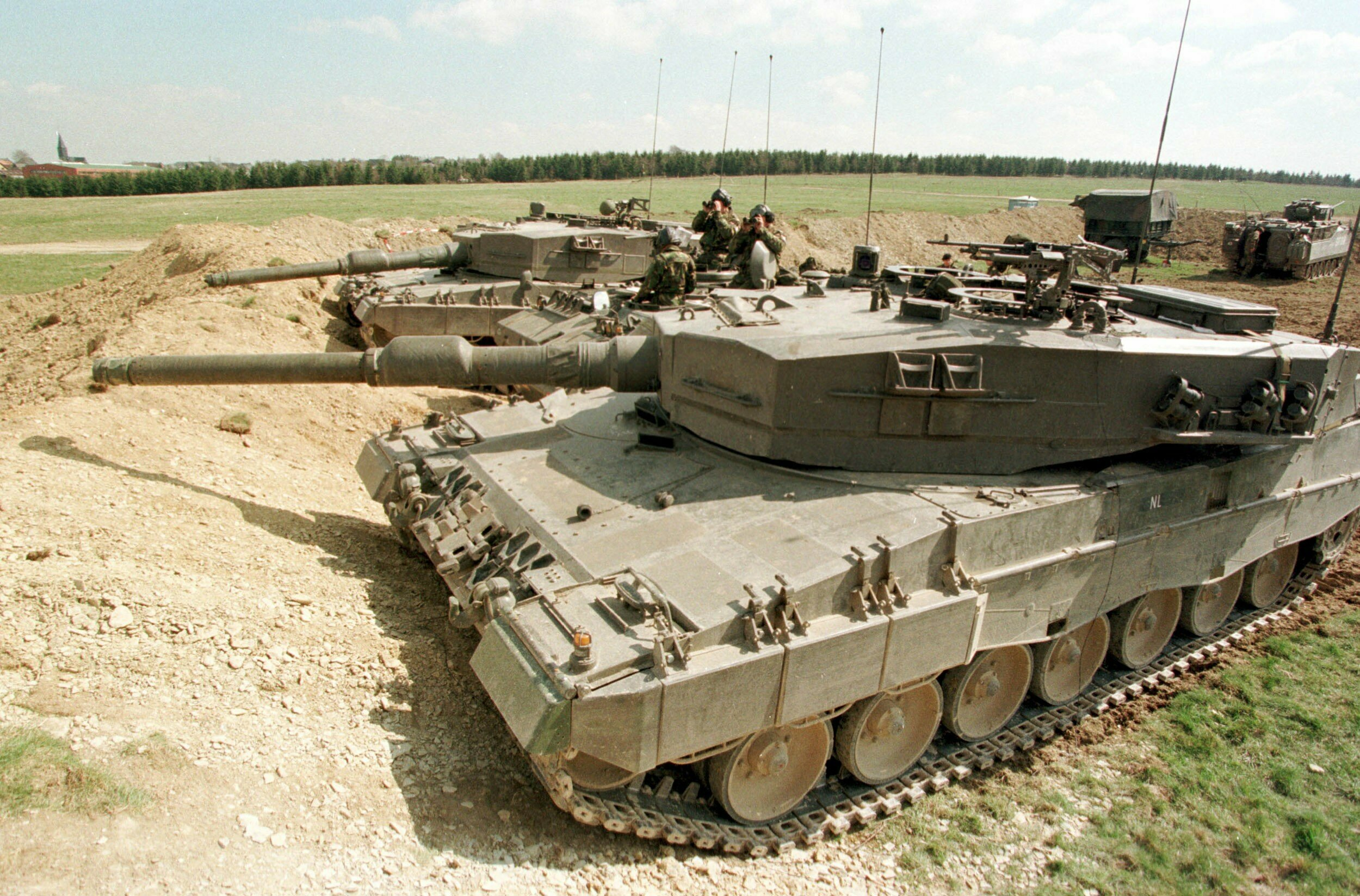
Dutch Leopard 2A4 tanks, 1997

While previous models only varied in detail, the Leopard 2A4 introduced a digital ballistic computer and an improved fire extinguishing system. Starting with the sixth batch, tanks were fitted with an improved armour array and new side skirts. In 1984, the German military procurement agency stated a number of requirements for a future Leopard 2 upgrade. In 1989, the Kampfwertsteigerung (combat potential improvement) programme was initiated in Germany with the delivery of first prototypes. The official military requirements were published in March 1990.

The KWS programme was projected to consist of three stages. The first stage replaced the Rheinmetall 120 mm L/44 gun barrel and the corresponding gun mount with a longer barrelled and more lethal L/55 version. This stage was adopted in the form of 225 Leopard 2A6 tanks, starting in 2001 and lasting until 2005. Stage 2 focused on improvements of armour protection and survivability: it was adopted in the form of the Leopard 2A5, starting in 1995. The base armour of the tank was exchanged and additional armour modules were installed at the turret. The first batch of 225 Leopard 2 tanks was upgraded to Leopard 2A5 configuration between 1995 and 1998; a second batch of 125 followed from 1999 to 2002.

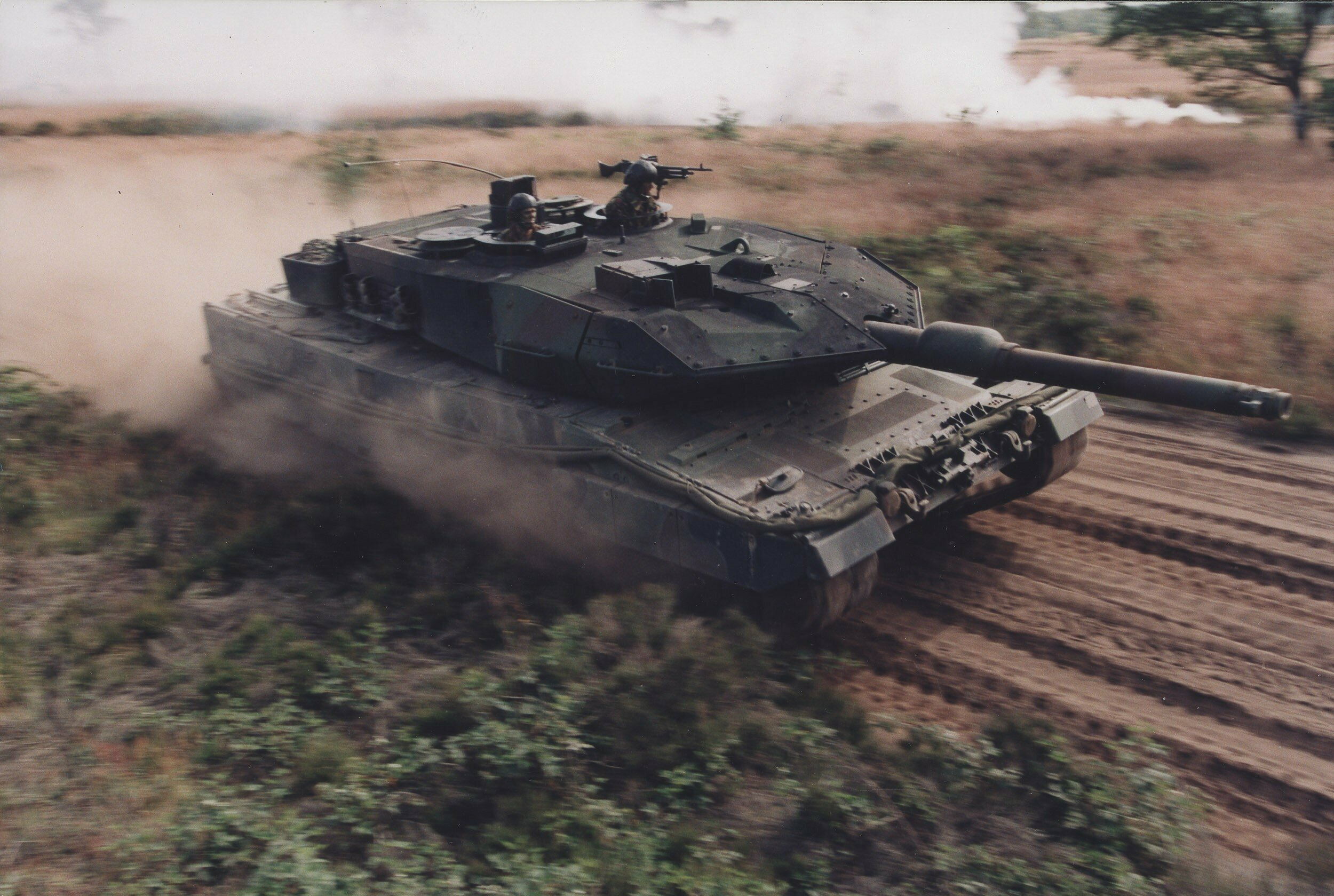
The Leopard 2A5 can be recognized for its angular spaced armour on the turret cheeks and 44-calibre 120 mm main gun.

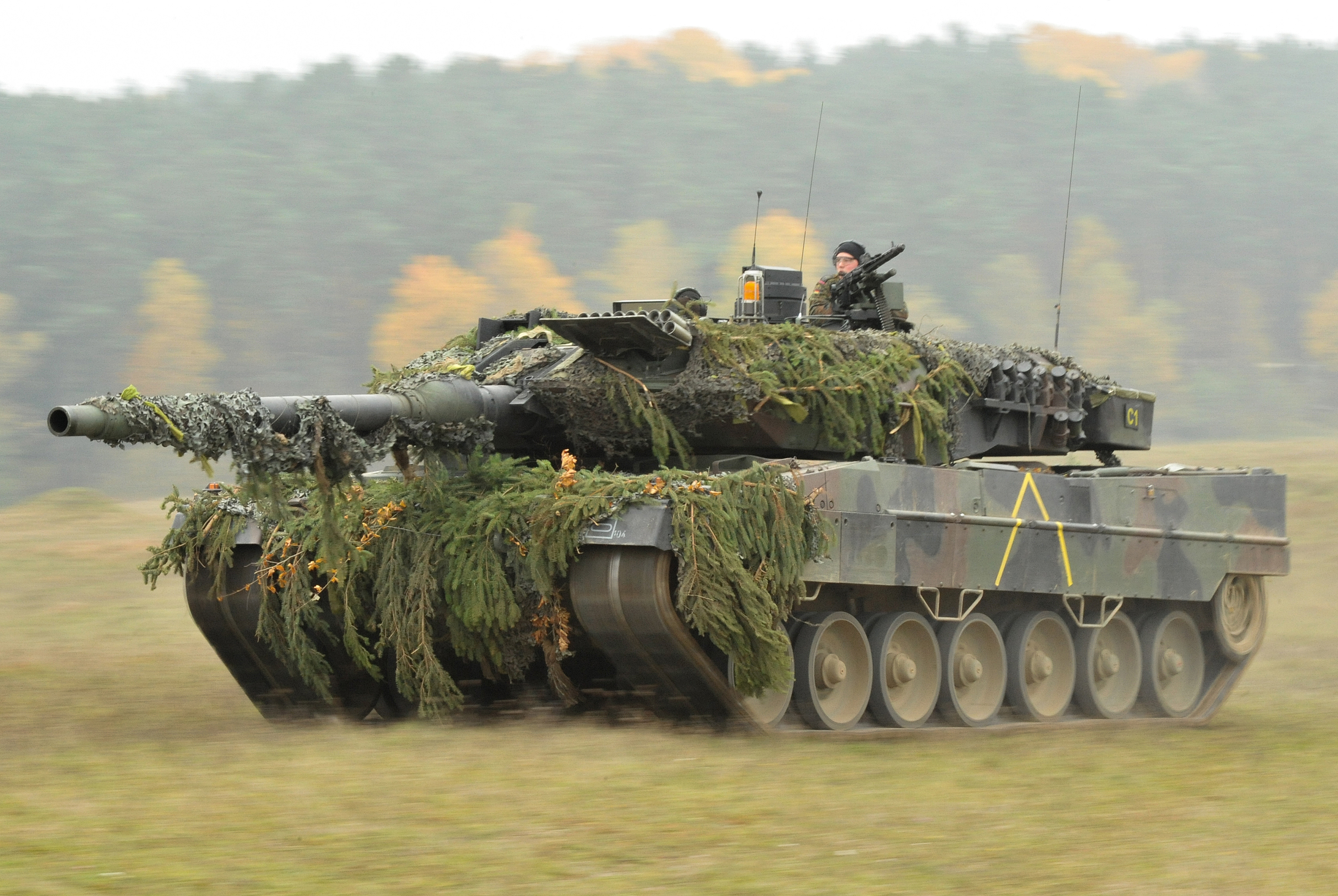
A German Army Leopard 2A6, assigned to the 104th Panzer Battalion conducting high-speed manoeuvres

The third stage was the planned replacement of the Leopard 2 turret by a new turret fitted with a 140 mm (5.5 in) NPzK tank gun, an autoloader, and the IFIS battlefield management system. The ballistic protection at the hull was to be improved. Originally a total requirement for 650 Leopard 2 tanks with KWS 3 was projected. It was never finalised, but the 140 mm (5.5 in) NPzK tank gun was tested on an older prototype. In 1995, it was decided to cancel due to changes in the political environment. The funds were redirected to the Neue Gepanzerte Plattformen (New Armoured Platforms) project of the German army. The Leopard 2A6M was developed with a kit providing enhanced protection against mines that can detonate below the hull (like mines with bending wire triggers) and explosively formed penetrator mines. The weight of the Leopard 2A6M is 62.5 tonnes (61.5 long tons; 68.9 short tons).

The latest version of the tank is the Leopard 2A7, which entered service in an initial batch of 20 tanks in 2014. Already before the first Leopard 2A7 tank was handed over to the German Army, plans for upgrades were made. At this time an "extensive" increase in combat value, while retaining the original mobility of the Leopard 2, was planned. The optics of the tank will also be improved.

In April 2015, Welt am Sonntag claimed that tungsten (wolfram) rounds used in Leopard 2 cannot penetrate the Russian T-90 or the modernized version of the T-80. They also stated that the German military will develop a new improved round, but it will be exclusively developed for the Leopard 2A7.

In 2015 Rheinmetall disclosed that it was developing a new 130 mm (5.1 in) smoothbore gun for the Leopard 2 tank and its successor. This gun will offer a 50% increase in performance and penetration. Marketing for the new gun was slated to begin in 2016.

==== Replacement ====
The Leopard 2 first entered service in 1979, and its service life is anticipated to end around 2030. In May 2015, the German Ministry of Defence announced plans to jointly develop a successor to both the Leopard 2 and Leclerc tanks with France. Technologies and concepts will be investigated to determine what capabilities are needed in a future tank.

Rather than a being traditional tank, the Main Ground Combat System (MGCS) was intended to be a multi-platform combat system comprising at least a manned gun platform, a manned support platform carrying hypervelocity missiles, and an unmanned support platform. Deployment of the MGCS, was to be preceded by incremental upgrades to the Leopard 2, including a new digital turret core system and situational awareness system and an active protection system (APS).

In the interim period before the MGCS enters service, lethality will be increased by adopting the higher-pressure 120 mm (4.7 in) L/55A1 gun, which is expected to deliver 20 percent better performance than the L/55 when firing new ammunition. Mid-term efforts will focus on a Rheinmetall 130 mm (5.1 in) cannon concept offering 50 percent better armour penetration. With the Russian T-14 Armata being equipped with the Afghanit, an active protection system designed to mitigate the effectiveness of ATGM, more importance is being placed on direct-fire weapons.

At Eurosatory 2026, PSM Projekt System & Management GmbH (a joint venture between KNDS Deutschland and Rheinmetall) presented the MBT Vision 2032 concept for the Kampfpanzer neue Generation (MBT new generation) featuring an unmanned turret, a 130 mm gun, active protection systems and reduced crew of three. This was intended as an interim solution until the MGCS would have entered service.

However, in July 2026, German media reported that the joint development of armoured fighting vehicles as part of the MGCS program had been abandoned; instead the program had been rescoped to cover the development of new, platform-independent technologies for use in each countries respective future tank designs. This step followed earlier reports about French president Emmanuel Macron tying the future of the MGCS program to the Future Combat Air System, which was cancelled in June 2026.

== Design ==
=== Protection ===
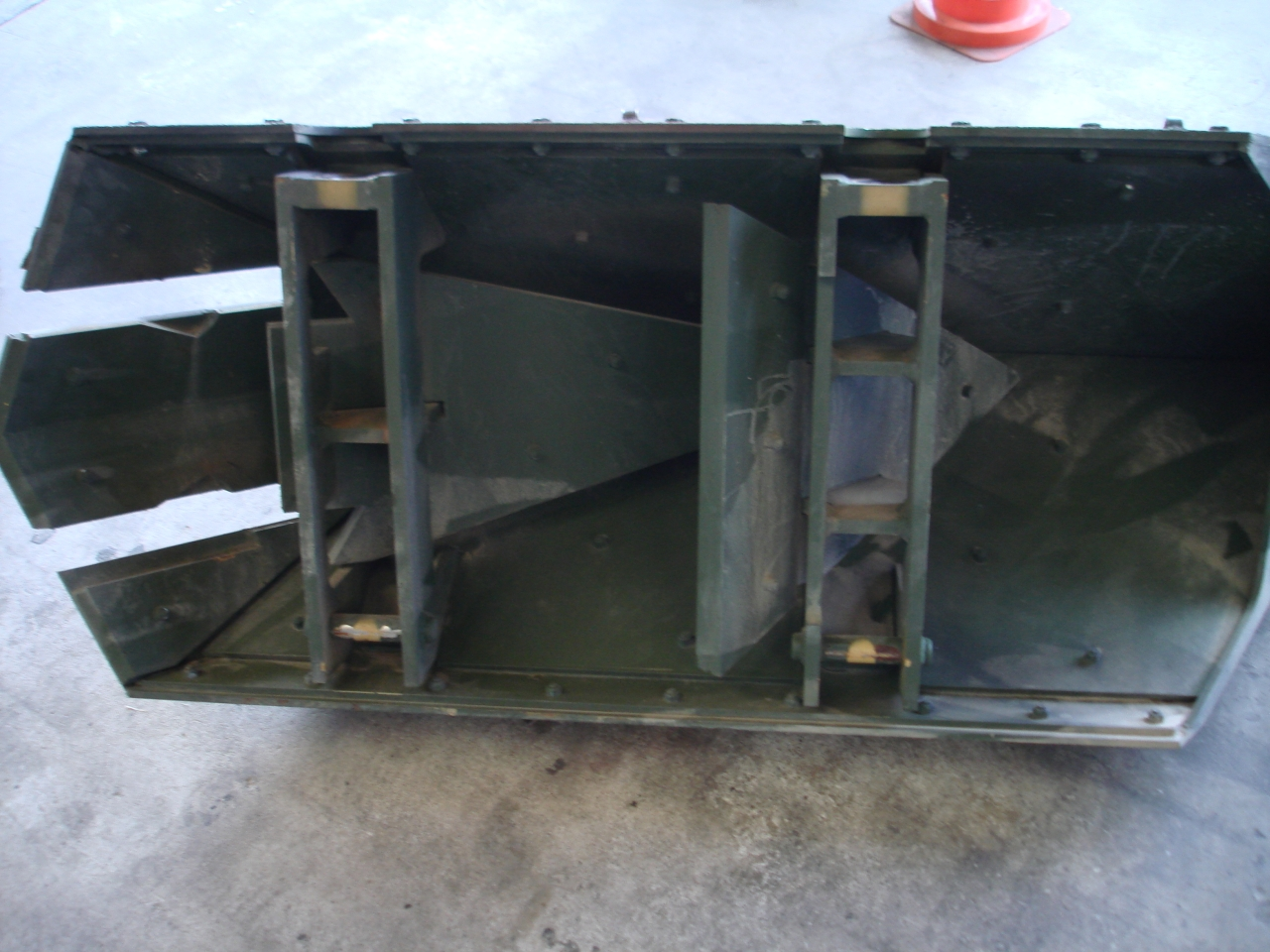
Arrowhead-shaped armour module of the Leopard 2A5

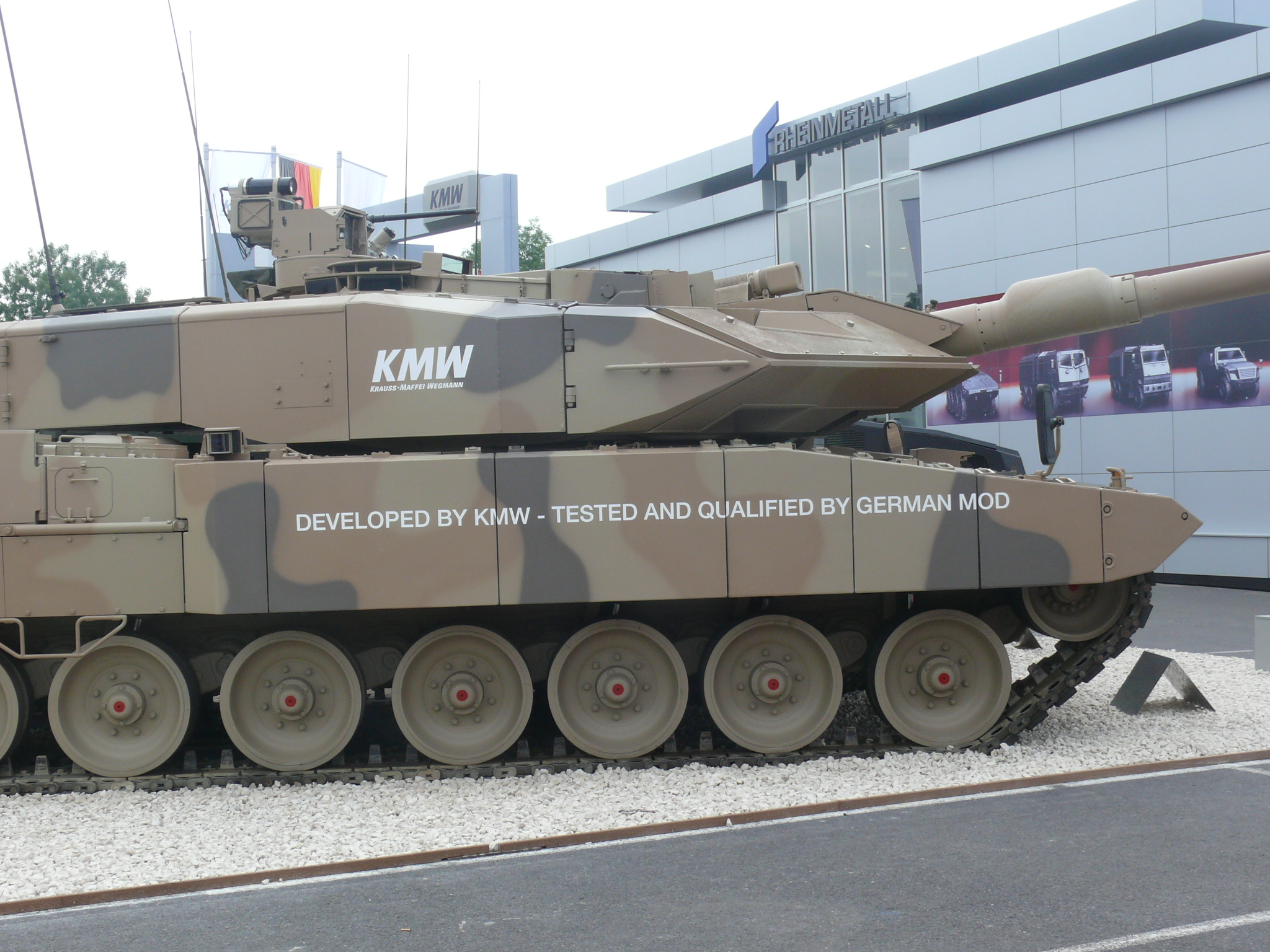
The turret and hull sides of the Leopard 2A7+ are fitted with additional armour modules.

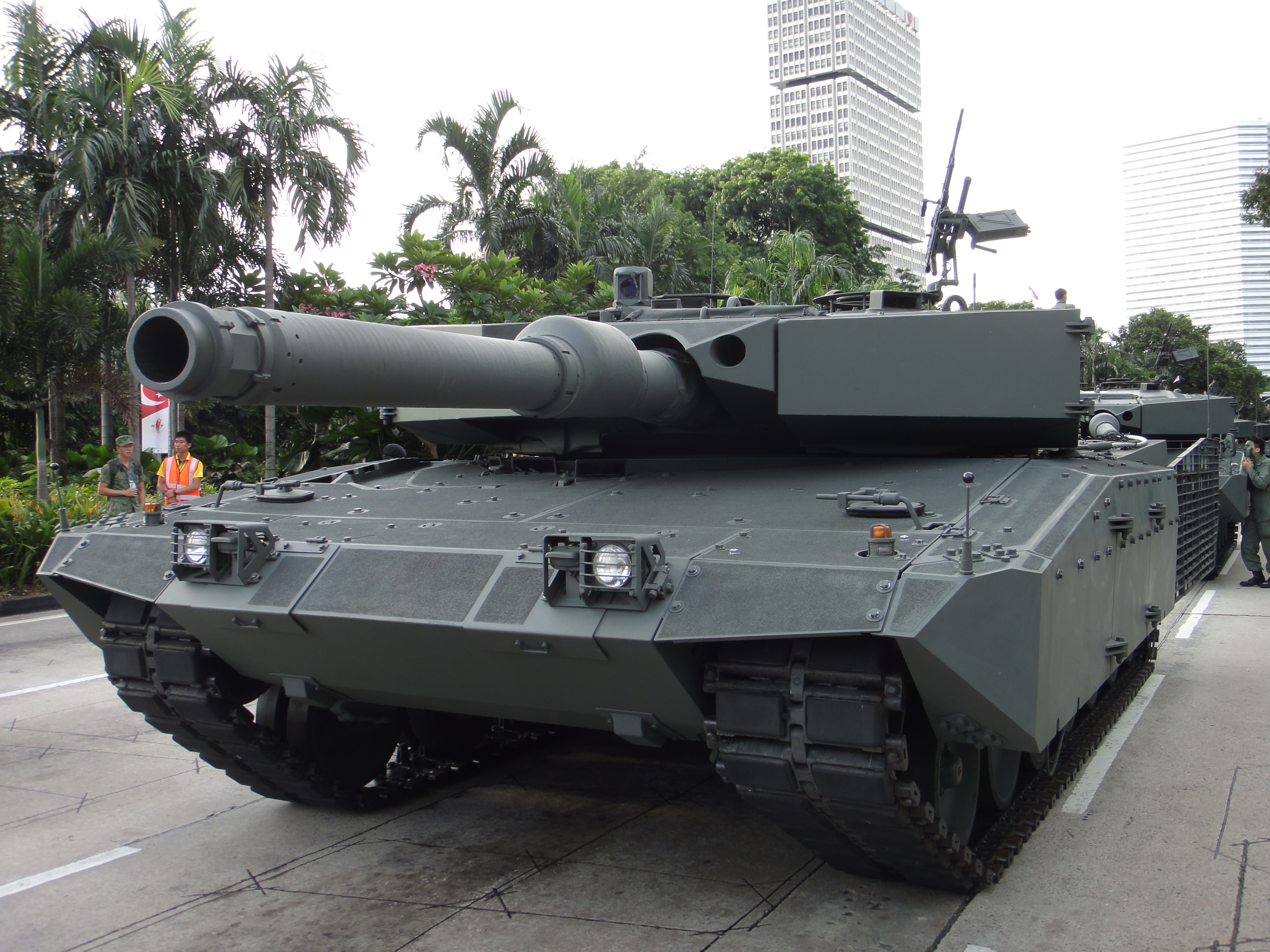
The Leopard 2SG is fitted with AMAP composite armour.

The Leopard 2 uses spaced multilayer armour throughout the design. The armour consists of a combination of steel plates of different hardness, elastic materials, and other non-metallic materials. Steel plates with high hardness and high ductility are used. The armour is a result of extensive research about the formation and penetration mechanism of shaped charge jets. The Leopard 2's armour might be based on the British Burlington armour, which had already been demonstrated to West Germany in 1970.

Later, in the mid-1970s, full details about Burlington were handed over to the West German government. The frontal arc of the Leopard 2's armour is designed to withstand large caliber kinetic energy penetrators and shaped charge projectiles. During the 1980s, it was estimated that the Leopard 2's front would resist 125 mm (4.9 in) armour-piercing fin-stabilized discarding sabot (APFSDS) rounds fired from a distance of 1,500 m (4,900 ft).

The Leopard 2A4's armour has a maximum physical thickness of 800 millimetres (31 in) based on unofficial measurements and estimates made by former conscripts and professional soldiers of the German army. On the Leopard 2A5 and subsequent models, the thickness is increased by the wedge-shaped armour module to 1,500 millimetres (59 in).

The side and the rear of the tank protect against heavy machine guns, medium caliber rounds, and older types of tank ammunition. The side of the hull is covered by armour skirts to increase protection against projectiles and rocket-propelled grenades (RPGs). The frontal third of the hull sides is covered by heavy ballistic skirts, while the rest of the hull sides is covered by steel-reinforced rubber skirts. For increased protection against mines, the sides of the hull floor are sloped by 45° and the floor is reinforced with corrugations.

==== Secondary protection ====
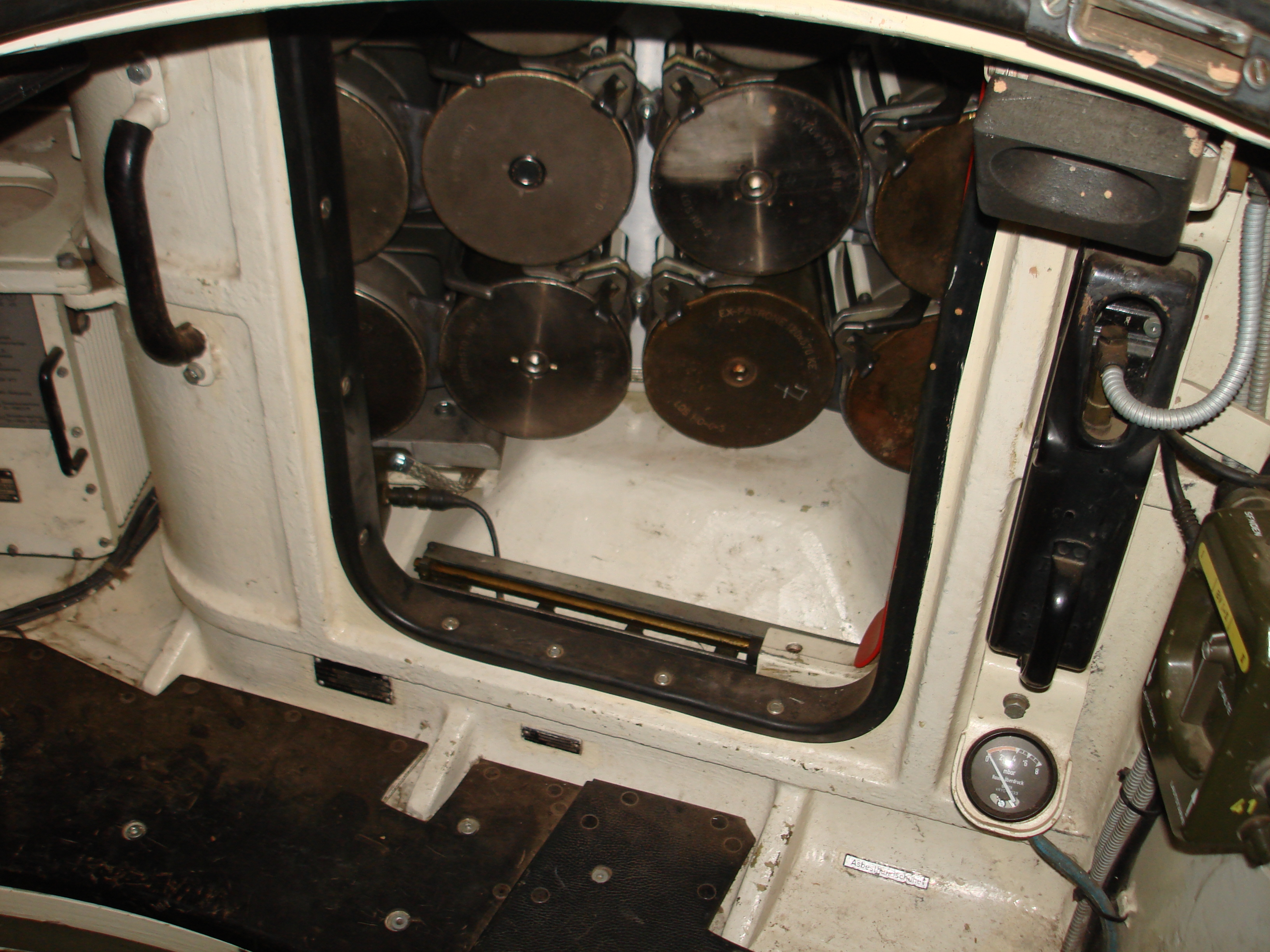
Ammunition storage in a Leopard 2A4

The Leopard 2's design follows the concept of compartmentation. Possible sources of fire or explosions have been moved away from the crew. In the turret, the ammunition and the hydraulics are located in compartments separated from the crew. In case of a detonation, the blow-off panels on the compartment roofs will direct the explosion and fire away from the crew. The crew is also protected against nuclear, biological and chemical (NBC) threats, as the Leopard 2 is equipped with a Dräger NBC overpressurization system, which provides up to 4 hPA over-pressure inside the vehicle.

Two groups of four Wegmann 76 mm (3.0 in) smoke mortars are mounted on either side of the turret and can be electrically fired either as single rounds or in salvos of four. They are mounted on most Leopard 2 models, with the exception of Dutch Leopard 2s, which are equipped instead with a Dutch-designed smoke mortar system with six barrels on each side. Swedish Stridsvagn 122 utilises French GALIX smoke dispensers, similar to the system found on the French Leclerc.

The Leopard 2 is equipped with a fire protection system. Four 9 kg (20 lb) halon fire extinguisher bottles are installed on the right behind the driver's station. The bottles are connected to pipes and hoses and are activated automatically by the fire detection system when temperatures rise above 82 °C (180 °F) inside the fighting compartment, or manually via a control panel in the driver's compartment. An extra 2.5 kg (5.5 lb) halon fire extinguisher is stored on the floor beneath the main gun.

==== Armour upgrades ====
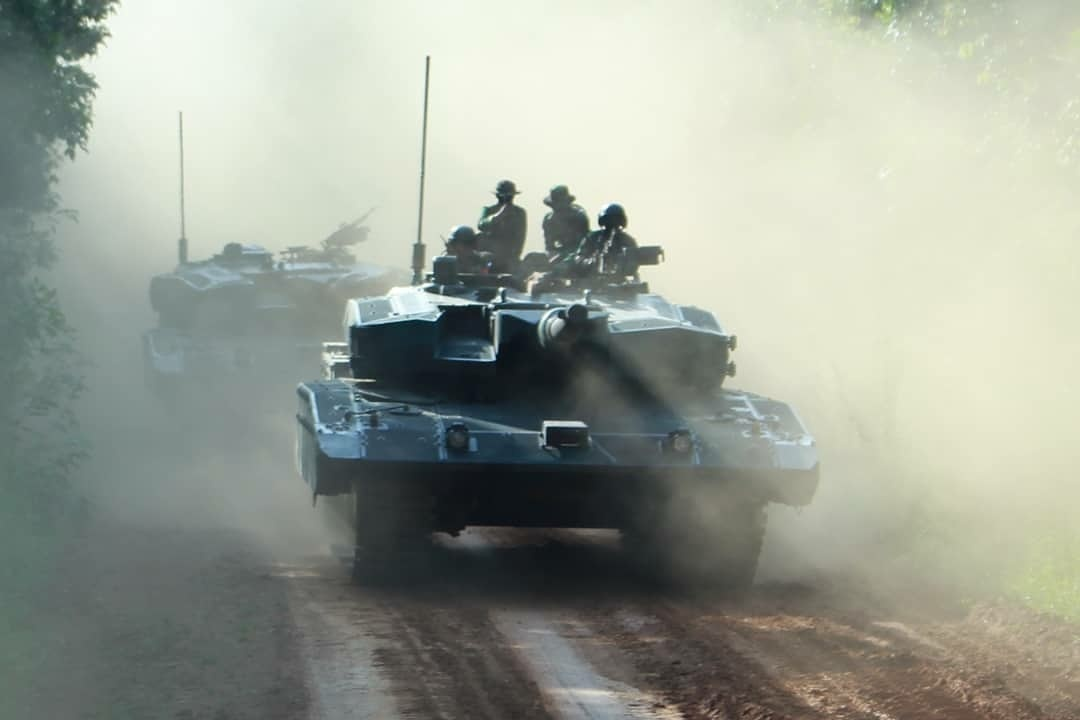
Indonesian Leopard 2RI of the 1st Cavalry Battalion with AMAP composite armour

Following Leopard 2's introduction into service in 1979, the armour has been gradually improved over the years. A modified version of spaced multilayer armour using so-called C-Technologie (C-technology) was introduced beginning with the 97th vehicle of the 6th production lot. The improved armour was used in the frontal arc of turret and hull. The same batch also introduced an improved type of heavy ballistic skirts. With the 8th production lot, the armour was supplemented with new skirts in D-Technologie.

The Leopard 2A5 upgrade focused on increased armour protection by using D-Technologie in aspects of the turret. While upgrading a Leopard 2 tank to the Leopard 2A5 configuration, the roof covering the armour modules is cut open and new armour modules are inserted. New additional armour modules made of laminated armour cover the frontal arc of the turret. They have a distinctive arrowhead shape and improve protection against both kinetic penetrators and shaped charges. The side skirts also incorporate improved armour protection. A 25 mm (0.98 in) thick spall liner reduces the danger of crew injuries in case of armour penetration.

The Leopard 2A7 features the latest generation of passive armour and belly armour providing protection against mines and IEDs. By using new approaches in the armour construction, the hull armour was improved significantly. The Leopard 2A7 is fitted with adaptors for mounting additional armour modules or protection systems against RPGs.

For urban combat, the Leopard 2 can be fitted with different packages of modular armour. The Leopard 2A4M CAN, Leopard 2 PSO (Peace Support Operations) and the Leopard 2A7 can mount thick modules of composite armour along the flanks of the turret and hull, while slat armour can be adapted at the vehicle's rear. The armour modules provide protection against the RPG-7, which depending on the warhead can penetrate between 280 millimetres (11 in) and 600 millimetres (24 in) of steel armour. The Leopard 2A6M CAN increases protection against rocket-propelled grenades (RPGs) by including additional slat armour.

Additional armour packages have been developed by a number of different companies. IBD Deisenroth has developed upgrades with MEXAS and Advanced Modular Armour Protection (AMAP) composite armour, the latter is being used on Singaporean and Indonesian Leopard 2 tanks. RUAG has developed an armour upgrade utilising their SidePRO-ATR composite armour. This upgrade was first presented on the IAV 2013.

The Leopard 2A4M and 2A6M add an additional mine protection plate for the belly, which increases protection against mines and IEDs.

On 22 February 2021, the German Defense Ministry agreed to acquire Trophy, an active protection system of Israeli design. 17 German Army tanks will be fitted with the system, with integration planned to be completed in 2023. Due to logistical and technical challenges, the Bundeswehr adjusted its initial plans for integrating Trophy into 17 Leopard 2 A7A1 tanks. Testing of the first tanks is now expected to conclude by mid-2024, with operational deployment set for early 2025. These 17 units, equipped with Trophy APS, will serve as a test platform for future configurations. Insights gained from this implementation will optimise production of the Leopard 2 A8, which will integrate Trophy APS into all 123 planned units, enhancing Germany's armoured capabilities.

==== Armour protection estimates ====
Estimated levels of protection for the Leopard 2 range from 590 to 690 mm (23 to 27 in) RHAe on the turret, 600 mm (24 in) RHAe on the glacis and lower front hull on the Leopard 2A4, to 920–940 mm (36–37 in) RHAe on the turret, 620 mm (24 in) RHAe on the glacis and lower front hull on the Leopard 2A6 against kinetic projectiles.

According to a description page hosted by the Federation of American Scientists, the armour of the Leopard 2A4 is believed to provide protection equivalent to 700 mm (28 in) armour steel (RHA) against kinetic energy penetratours and 1,000 mm (39 in) RHA against shaped charge warheads.

=== Armament ===
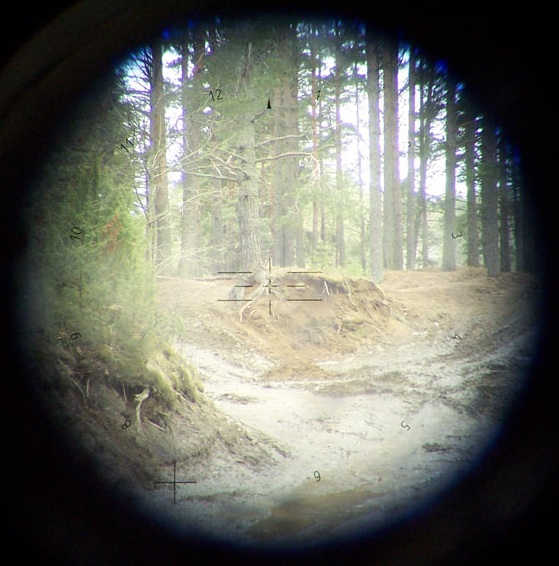
A view through the panoramic PERI R17 sight

==== Primary ====
The primary armament for production versions of the Leopard 2 is the Rheinmetall 120 mm (4.7 in) smoothbore gun—the same gun later adapted for use on the M1 Abrams—in either the L/44 variant (found on all production Leopard 2s until the A5), or the L/55 variant (as found on the Leopard 2A6 and subsequent models).

Ammunition for the gun comprises 27 rounds stored in a special magazine in the forward section of the hull, to the left of the driver's station, with an additional 15 rounds stored in the left side of the turret bustle, which is separated from the fighting compartment by an electrically operated door. If the turret's ammunition storage area is hit, a blow-off panel in the turret roof would direct an explosion upwards away from the crew compartment. However, the 27 other rounds stored in the forward section of the hull, to the left of the driver's station, do not have this protection and would cause catastrophic secondary explosions if the hull were hit. This is a weakness of the Leopard 2's design.

The gun is fully stabilised, and can fire a variety of types of rounds, such as the German DM43 APFSDS-T anti-tank round, which is said to be able to penetrate 560 millimeters (22 in) of steel armour at a range of 2,000 metres (2,200 yd), and the German DM12 high-explosive anti-tank (HEAT).

For the L/55 gun, a newer APFSDS-T round was introduced to take advantage of the longer barrel, the DM53, which is said to be able to penetrate up to 750 mm (30 in) of RHAe armour at a range of 2,000 m (6,600 ft). The bore evacuator and the gun's thermal sleeve of the A4 and A5, designed to regulate the temperature of the barrel, are fabricated from glass-reinforced plastic. The barrel has a chrome lining to increase barrel life. The main gun is capable of power elevating from +20° to −9°.

Rheinmetall has developed an upgrade for Leopard 2 tanks to give them the ability to fire the Israeli LAHAT anti-tank guided missile through the main gun. The missile can engage targets out to a range of 6,000 metres (20,000 ft).

==== Secondary ====
The Leopard 2 is equipped with two machine guns, one mounted co-axially, the other an anti-aircraft mount. German models use the MG 3 7.62 mm (0.3 in) machine gun; Dutch and Singaporean models use FN MAG 7.62 mm (0.3 in) machine guns; Swiss models use Swiss MG 87 7.5 mm (0.295 in) machine guns. 4,750 rounds of machine gun ammunition are carried on board the Leopard 2, of which 2,000 rounds are carried for the coaxial machine gun. More recent variants such as the Leopard 2A7+ are capable of mounting a Remotely-Controlled Weapons Station fitted with a Browning M2HB Heavy Machine Gun, near the commander's hatch.

==== Fire control ====
The standard fire control system found on the Leopard 2 is the German EMES 15 fire control system with a dual magnification stabilized primary sight. The primary sight has an integrated neodymium yttrium aluminium garnet Nd:YAG laser rangefinder and a 120 element mercury cadmium telluride, HgCdTe (also known as CMT) Zeiss thermographic camera, both of which are linked to the tank's fire control computer. A backup 8x auxiliary telescope FERO-Z18 is mounted coaxially for the gunner.

The commander has an independent periscope, the Rheinmetall/Zeiss PERI R17 A2. This is a stabilised panoramic periscope sight designed for day/night observation and target identification. It provides an all round view with a traverse of 360°. The thermal image from the commander's periscope is displayed on a monitor inside the tank. Initial production tanks were not equipped with a thermal sight, due to the sight not being ready, and instead temporarily substituted the PZB 200 low light TV system (LLLTV).

The fire control suite is capable of providing up to three range values in four seconds. The range data is transmitted to the fire control computer and is used to calculate the firing solution. Because the laser rangefinder is integrated into the gunner's primary sight, the gunner is able to read the digital range measurement directly. The maximum range of the laser rangefinder is up to 10,000 m (33,000 ft) with a measuring accuracy within 10 m (33 ft) at this range. The combined system allows the Leopard 2 to engage moving targets at ranges of up to 5,000 m (16,000 ft) whilst itself being on the move over rough terrain.

=== Propulsion ===
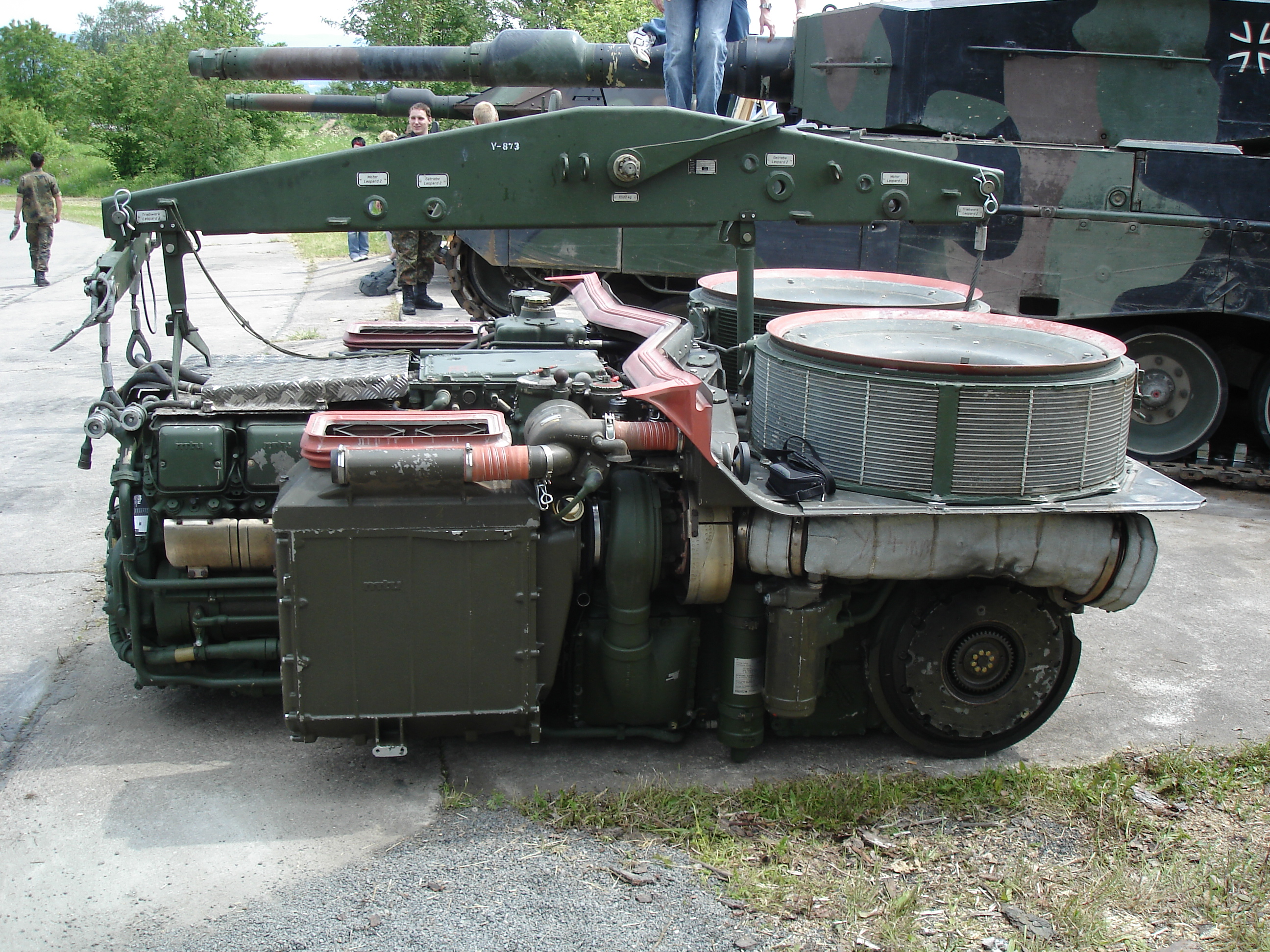
The Leopard 2's MB 873 Ka-501 V12 engine

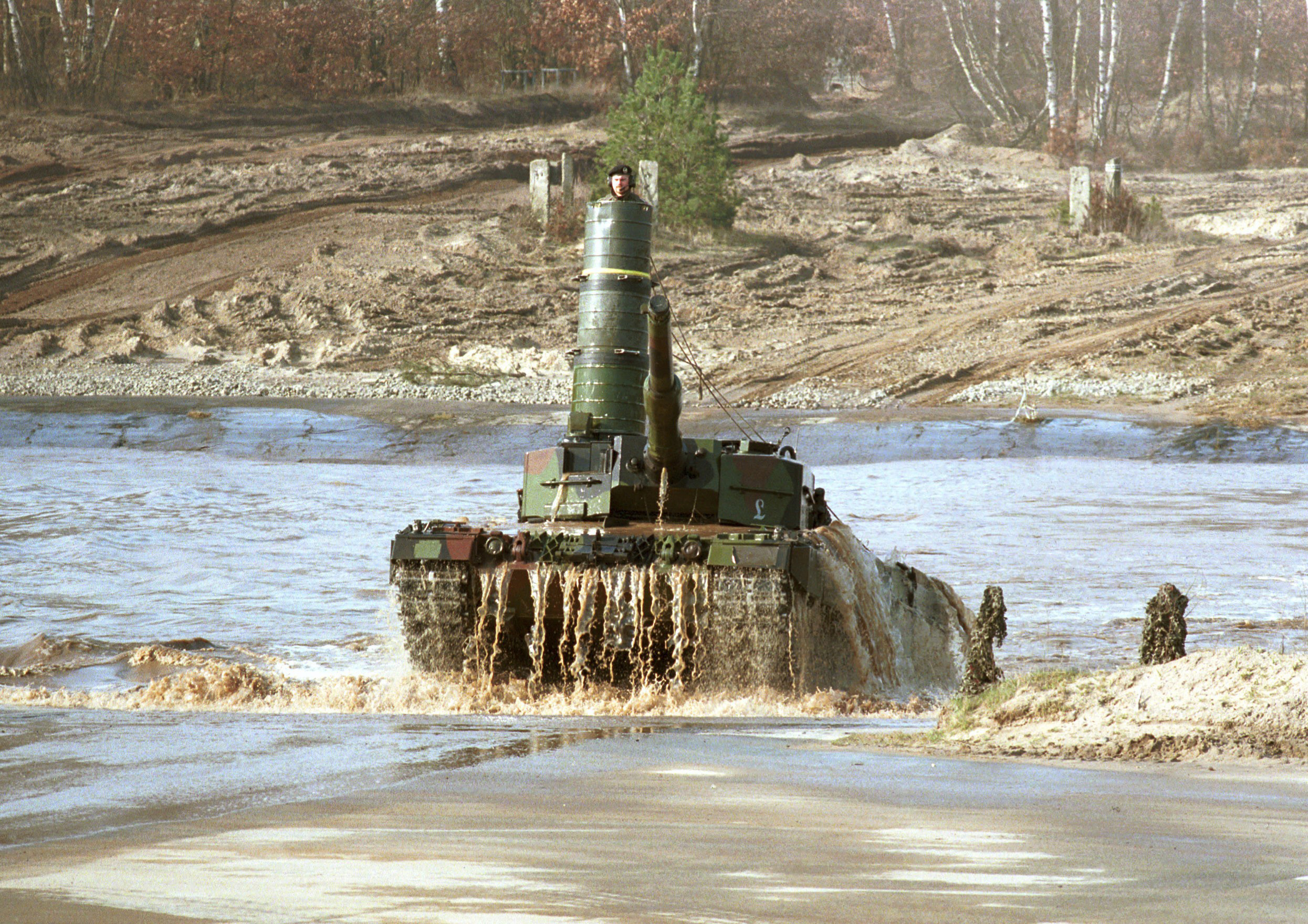
German Leopard 2A4 with turret snorkel, 2010

The Leopard 2 is propelled by the MTU MB 873 Ka-501 engine. It provides 1,500 PS (1.1 MW) at 2,600 RPM and 4,700 N⋅m (3,500 lb⋅ft) of torque at 1,600–1,700 RPM. The MTU MB 873 Ka-501 is a four-stroke, 47.7 litre, 90° V-block 12-cylinder, twin-turbocharged and intercooled, liquid-cooled diesel engine (with multi-fuel capability). It has an estimated fuel consumption rate of around 300 litres per 100 km on roads and 500 litres per 100 km across the country, and is coupled to the Renk HSWL 354 gear and brake system.

The Renk HSWL 354 transmission has four forward and two reverse gears, with a torque converter and is completely automatic, with the driver selecting the range. The Leopard 2 has four fuel tanks, which have a total capacity of approximately 1,160 L (260 imp gal; 310 US gal), giving a maximum road range of about 500 km (310 mi). The propulsion pack is capable of driving the tank to a top road speed of 68 km/h (42 mph) (limited to 50 km/h (31 mph) during peacetime by law), and a top reverse speed of 31 km/h (19 mph). The power pack can be changed in the field in 35 minutes. The engine and transmission are separated from the crew compartment through a fireproof bulkhead. An enhanced version of the EuroPowerPack, with a 1,650 PS (1.2 MW) MTU MT883 engine has been trialled by the Leopard 2.

The Leopard 2 has a torsion bar suspension and has advanced friction dampers. The running gear consists of seven dual rubber-tired road wheels and four return rollers per side, with the idler wheel at the front and drive sprocket at the rear. The tracks are Diehl 570F tracks, with rubber-bushed end connectors, which have removable rubber pads and use 82 links on each track. For use in icy ground, up to 18 rubber pads can be replaced by the same number of grousers, which are stored in the vehicle's bow when not in use. The upper part of the tracks are covered with side skirts.

The Leopard 2 can drive through water 4 metres (13 ft) deep using a snorkel or 1.2 metres (3 ft 11 in) without any preparation. It can climb vertical obstacles over 1 metre (3.3 ft) high.

The German Army has prioritised mobility in the Leopard 2, which has made it one of the fastest MBTs in the world.

Ukrainian forces have said that the Leopard 2 tank is only slightly louder than a diesel van. This lack of noise, they claim, gives them a tactical advantage during an ambush. One Ukrainian commander estimated that Russian forces only heard the Leopard 2 from 200 m (660 ft), during an ambush, compared to 2–3 km (1.2–1.9 mi) for their older Soviet era tanks.

== Exports ==
Germany has fielded about 2,125 Leopard 2 main battle tanks in various versions, but many were sold following German reunification. The Leopard 2 became very popular in the 1990s, when the shrinking German army offered many of its redundant Leopard 2s at a reduced price. It became successful enough in Europe that the manufacturer started calling it the Euro Leopard, despite France, the United Kingdom, and Italy all operating their own MBTs. With further non-European orders, the name "Global-Leopard" is now used instead. Leopard 2 tanks have also been resold by original export customers, although reexport has always been conditional on consent from the German government who control the platform's export licence. Other countries have bought newly manufactured vehicles or have produced them locally under licence.

=== Europe ===
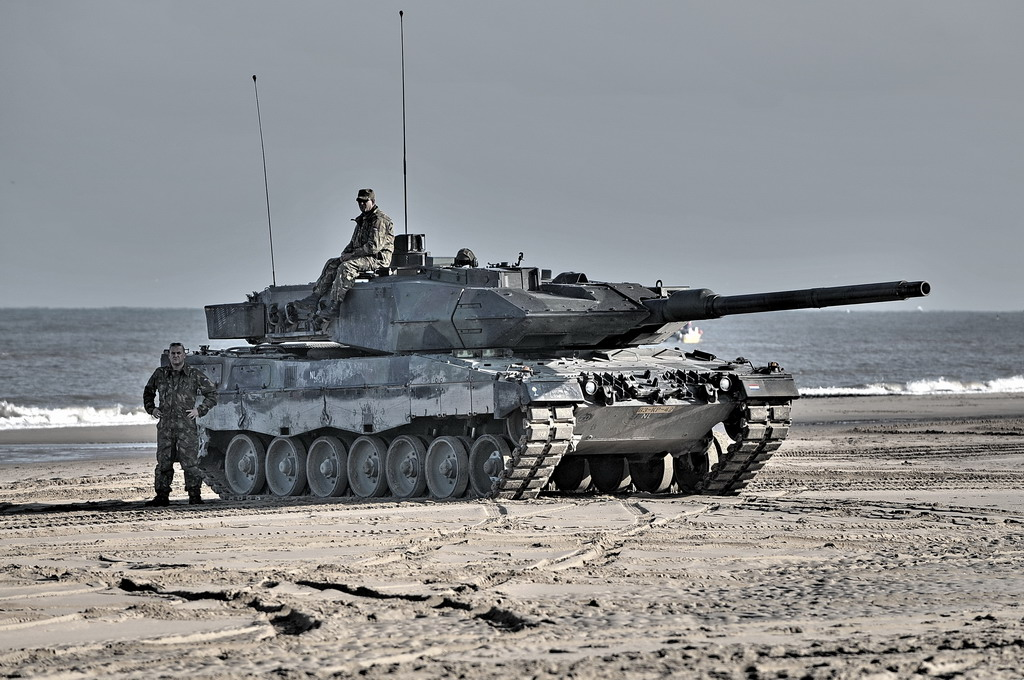
A Leopard 2A6 in Dutch service

The Netherlands ordered 445 Leopard 2 tanks on 2 March 1979, after examining the results of the Leopard 2AV in the United States. It became the first export customer of the Leopard 2 and the vehicles were delivered between July 1981 and July 1986. Dutch Leopard 2 tanks have been subsequently exported to Austria, Canada, Norway, and Portugal. In 2011 the last Dutch tank division was disbanded and their last Leopard 2 tanks were sold. Then in 2015, because of rising tensions with Russia because of Malaysia Airlines Flight 17 and the Russian occupation of Crimea, the Dutch army announced that they would start leasing 18 Leopard 2A6 tanks from Germany. These tanks are operated in joint German-Dutch division. In September 2024 the Dutch army announced that they would order 46 Leopard 2A8 with 6 options. These will not be replacing the leased Leopard 2A6's from Germany. It is currently unknown if they will be operated in a joint German-Dutch division.

The Swiss Army decided to purchase Leopard 2 tanks over the M1A1 Abrams after trialling both tanks between August 1981 and June 1982. The Swiss decision was made in August 1983 and the funding was approved by the government in 1984. Thirty-five of the tanks were delivered by Kraus-Maffei by June 1987. Eidgenössische Konstruktionswerkstätte Thun started license production of 345 additional vehicles in December 1987.

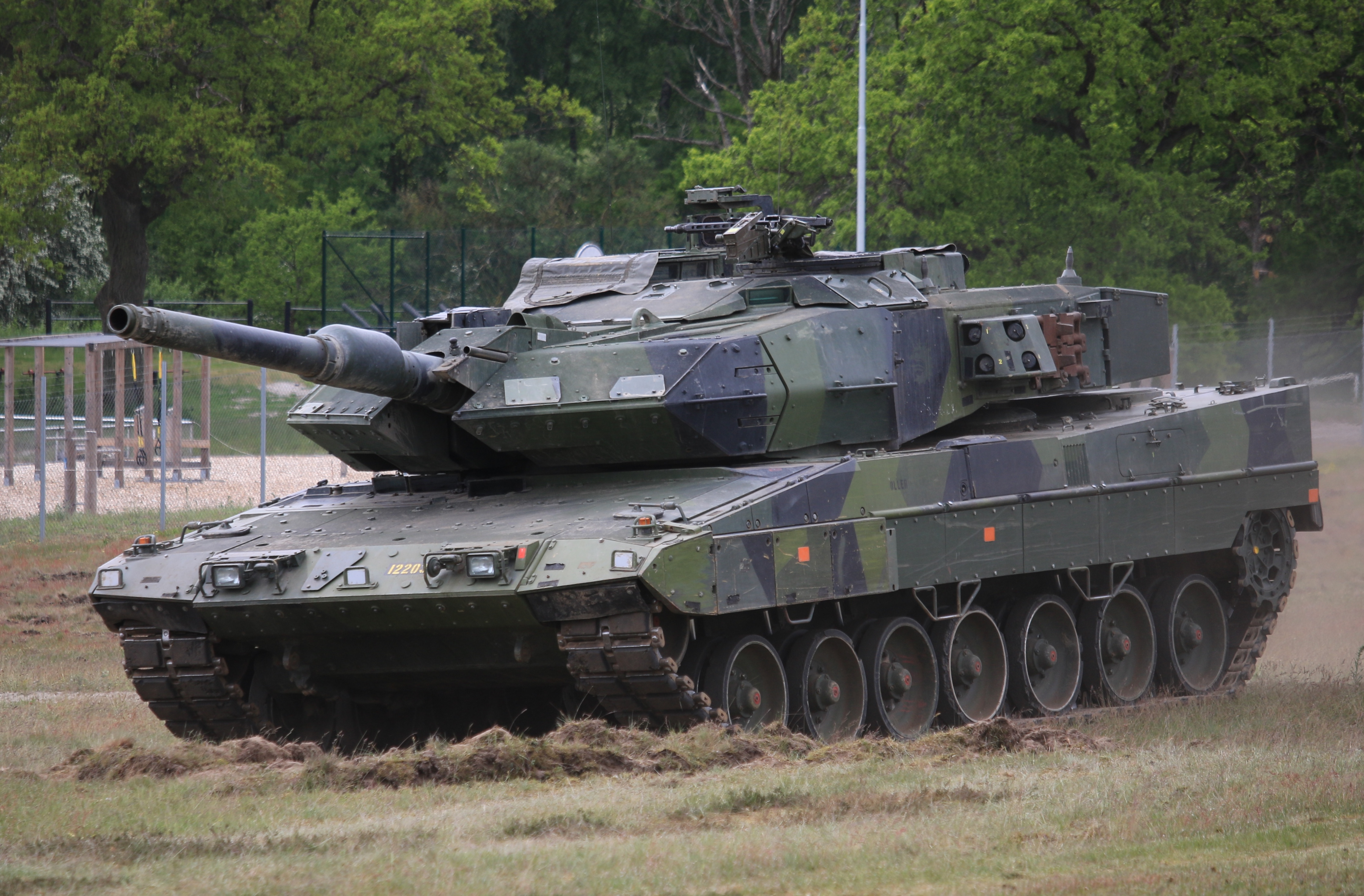
A Stridsvagn 122 in 2019. This is a Swedish derivative of the Leopard 2A5.

After investigating the option of a locally developed replacement for the strv 103 tank, Sweden decided to buy a foreign tank model. The Leopard 2 Improved (Leopard 2A5 prototype) won the competition against the M1A2 Abrams and the French Leclerc. The Swedish military also evaluated the Soviet T-80U tank, but separately from the other tanks. After intensive tests from January to June 1994, the Swedish military opted for the Leopard 2. The Swedish military found that the Leopard 2 Improved met their military demands by 90%. The M1A2 met the Swedish requirements by 86%, whereas the Leclerc met 63%. In June 1994, Sweden ordered the production of 120 modified Leopard 2A5, to be known as stridsvagn 122 (strv 122) in Swedish service. The strv 122 features Swedish-developed appliqué armour, a new command system, and improved electronics. Of the 120 Strv 122, 29 were manufactured in Germany by Krauss-Maffei Wegmann while the other 91 were manufactured by the Swedish firms Bofors and Hägglunds. The first Stridsvagn 122 was delivered in December 1996. These remain in Swedish service and have received periodic upgrades.

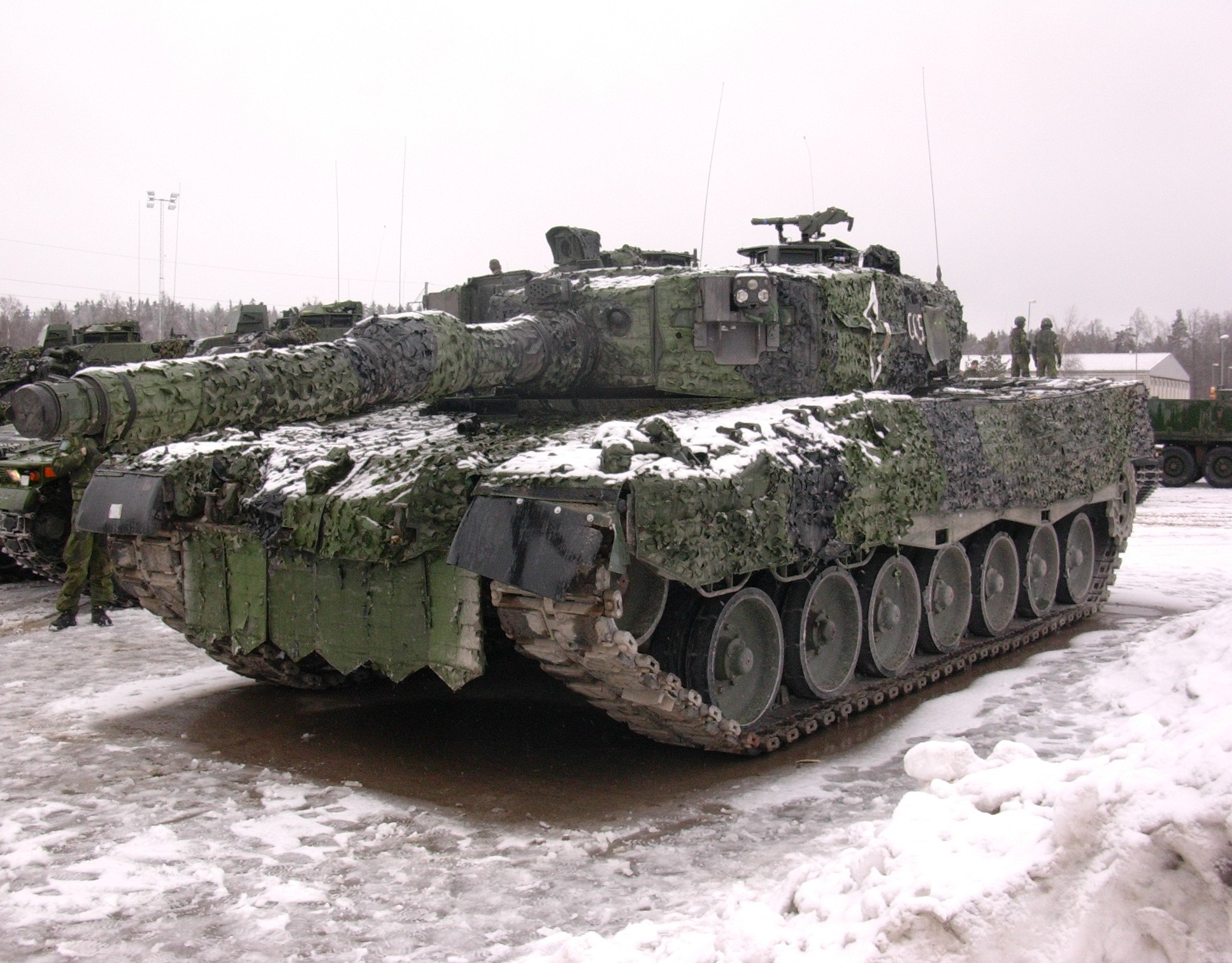
Stridsvagn 121 (Swedish Leopard 2A4)

Sweden also leased a total of 160 Leopard 2A4 tanks in 1994 and 1995, known in Swedish service as Stridsvagn 121 (Strv 121), as a stopgap measure while the strv 122 were being delivered. The first Strv 121 was delivered in February 1994. The Strv 121 fleet was removed from active service in 2002 as a result of the Defence Act of 2000 and mothballed by 2006. While most of the strv 121 tanks were returned to Germany, 18 were kept by Sweden as training aids; six have since been converted into AEV 3 Kodiak armoured engineering vehicles, and a further six have been converted into Leguan armoured bridge layers.

In January 2025 Sweden ordered a new batch of 44 Leopard 2 A8 from Germany and announced that the remaining Leopard 2 (Stridsvagn 122) would be modernised and upgraded.

Denmark bought 51 ex-German Leopard 2A4 tanks after the Danish military school, the Hærens Kampskole, recommended basing the adoption of a new tank on the Swedish army trials. The first tanks were delivered in 1998, but the upgrade to Leopard 2A5 level was already decided the next year. In 2004–2006, the Danish army bought another 18 ex-German Leopard 2 tanks, six of which were upgraded to Leopard 2A5.

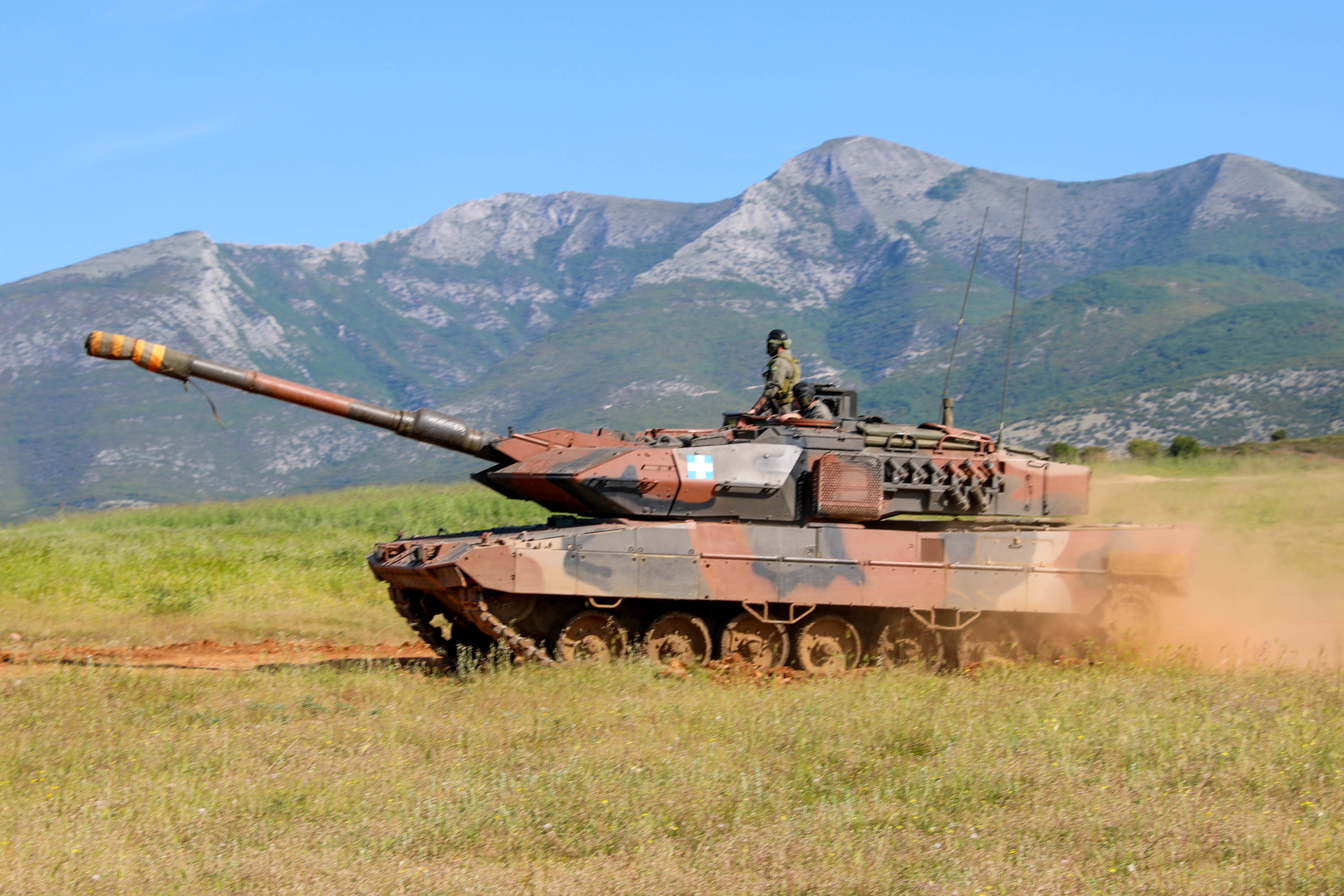
A Greek Leopard 2A6 on a training exercise in 2021

In 1998, Greece held a competition to determine the main battle tank for the Hellenic Army. The Leopard 2 Improved managed to outperform the Challenger 2E, Leclerc, M1A2 Abrams, T-80U, and T-84 and was chosen by the Greek officials. In March 2003, Greece ordered 170 Leopard 2 tanks, of which 140 were locally assembled. Greece also bought 183 Leopard 2A4 and 150 Leopard 1 tanks.

Spain initially leased 109 Leopard 2A4 tanks, after Krauss-Maffei withdrew from the Lince development, a special lighter version of the Leopard 2 developed together with Santa Bárbara Sistemas. Before the end of the Lince tank, Spain had already rejected the M1A1 Abrams and the Vickers Valiant. After deciding to purchase the leased tanks, Santa Bárbara Sistemas acquired the licence to locally produce 219 Leopard 2A6 tanks for the Spanish army.

Poland received 128 Leopard 2A4 tanks from German army stocks in 2002. In 2013 Poland ordered a further 119 ex-German Leopard 2s. Finland bought 124 used Leopard 2A4 tanks and six armoured bridge-layer Leopard 2L tanks from Germany in 2002 and 2003. The tanks served as replacements for the old Soviet-made T-55 and T-72M1. The Netherlands resold 114 of their tanks (and one turret) to Austria, 80 to Canada in 2007, 52 to Norway, 37 to Portugal and 100 to Finland.

In December 2018, Hungary placed an order for 44 Leopard 2A7+s and 12 secondhand 2A4s. The order coincided with the procurement of 24 Panzerhaubitze 2000, and was expected to replace Hungary's current fleet of T-72 tanks "no sooner than 2020".

In February 2023, the Norwegian Prime Minister, Jonas Gahr Stoere, announced that Norway would be ordering 54 new Leopard 2A7 tanks at a cost of kr 19.7 billion with a further option for 18 vehicles to be delivered at a later date. The first Leopard 2A7s are due to be delivered by 2026, and operational by 2031. The Norwegian government had been weighing up either the Leopard 2A7 or the South Korean K2 Black Panther as a replacement for its aging Leopard 2A4 fleet. The tanks will be designated Leopard 2A8 NOR.

==== Transfer to Ukraine ====
On 2 July 2023, Ukraine had reportedly received 54 Leopard 2A4 from NATO-member countries.

===== Political discussions =====
Since April 2022, in the wake of the Russian invasion, the Ukrainian government has requested that their allies donate Western-made main battle tanks. Poland, Finland and others have all announced a willingness to contribute Leopard 2 tanks from their stocks, with around 100 tanks from various states ready to be transferred to Ukraine. However, when Germany exported the tanks to these countries, it had made reexport conditional on a German government permit, as based on the Kriegswaffenkontrollgesetz and Außenwirtschaftsgesetz. Until 22 January 2023, it was unclear whether such a consent would be provided with Germany determined to avoid any perception of escalating the conflict, and wary of being labelled an aggressor. Germany has also been keen to extract an American commitment to provide its own M1 Abrams tanks, before sending German-made Leopard 2 tanks to Ukraine.

The matter was discussed at a conference of defence ministers from NATO members and allies, but no agreement was reached. The German position was heavily criticized by some of the other European governments with Poland threatening to unilaterally export their Leopards if permission from Berlin was not given. The Polish and Ukrainian governments then announced that Ukrainian soldiers would start training on Polish Leopard 2 tanks in Poland. The German government also faced domestic criticism for their stance. Many critics viewed the Leopard question as symptomatic of Germany's mishandling of defence and security. In a statement that gained German media attention, political analyst Jessica Berlin referred to the then Federal Minister of Defence Christine Lambrecht as a "clueless sock puppet".

On 22 January 2023, the German minister for foreign affairs, Annalena Baerbock, told French media that Germany "would not stand in the way" of any Polish decision to send Leopard 2 tanks to Ukraine but noted that "for the moment the question has not been asked." Two days later, Poland made an official request for permission to transfer Polish Leopards to Ukraine.

On 24 January Der Spiegel reported that the German Chancellor, Olaf Scholz, would the following day, officially announce the transfer of an undisclosed number of German Leopard 2 tanks to Ukraine, beginning with 14 Leopard 2A6s from the active Bundeswehr inventory. The German government would also give permission to any country seeking to reexport Leopard 2 tanks to Ukraine. These reports were formally confirmed by the German government on 25 January.

It was also reported that Boris Pistorius, the German defence minister, was encouraging Leopard-operating states to start training Ukrainian personnel in their use.

The German decision to provide and approve the provision of Leopard 2 tanks to Ukraine came after U.S. President Joe Biden decided to provide Ukraine with M1 Abrams tanks, as Germany insisted on moving in coordination with its allies. The decision to provide M1 Abrams tanks had previously been opposed by the Pentagon.

On 15 February 2023, Pistorius expressed his frustration at Germany's allies in their announcement of any donations of Leopard 2 tanks to Ukraine, saying it had "not been exactly breathtaking, to put it mildly." Since the change in German position on exports, only Poland had matched the German promise to provide 14 tanks - the two largest donations from a single country.

===== Germany =====
On 25 January 2023, the German government confirmed that it would make 14 Leopard 2A6 (a company-strength number) available for Ukraine and would give authorisation to European partners to reexport their vehicles. The goal is for European Leopard 2 operators to provide two battalions worth, or 88 tanks, to Ukraine.

According to the German government, the tanks will be delivered to Ukraine after training Ukrainian service personnel. This process would take up to three months. Some tanks are held by the Bundeswehr, others by the Leopard manufacturer Rheinmetall. The latter has said they could be ready to be dispatched by March 2023. However, they also warned that some vehicles held in long-term storage would require extensive refurbishment and updating before they could be considered suitable for combat in Ukraine. On 26 January, Pistorius, the German minister of defense, stated that the tanks would be delivered in late March or early April. On 24 February 2023, the German Department of Defence confirmed Germany would increase its Leopard 2A6 contribution from 14 to 18, thus providing 1 full tank battalion together with the contributions of Portugal and Sweden.

On 27 March 2023, Germany delivered 18 Leopard 2A6 tanks to Ukraine with two accompanying armoured recovery vehicles and necessary spare parts.

On 28 March 2023, the security board of the Swiss National Council recommended that 25 Leopard 2 in storage should be sold to the German manufacturer Krauss-Maffei-Wegmann so that Germany can replace some of its own tanks now serving in Ukraine. As of this day, Switzerland keeps 96 Leopard 2 in storage. As the tanks' sale requires decommissioning, the Bundeswehr waits for approval by the Swiss parliament.

On 27 September 2023, the Swiss parliament has voted to decommission 25 Leopard 2 tanks, allowing them to be sold back to Germany. Germany has given assurances that ex-Swiss tanks will not be sent to Ukraine.

===== Poland =====
Poland welcomed the German decision to allow the transfer of Leopard 2 tanks to Ukraine, with the Polish government announcing on 25 January it would transfer 14 Leopards to Ukraine from a total Polish stock of 247, in addition to a further 50–60 Soviet-era tanks. On 24 February 2023, the first 4 Leopard 2A4 tanks from Polish stocks were delivered to Ukraine. These are the first Leopard 2 tanks to be operated by Ukraine.

===== Canada =====
On 26 January 2023, the Canadian Defence Minister, Anita Anand, announced that Canada would be sending four Leopard 2A4 tanks to Ukraine, with the potential for more to follow. These vehicles were reportedly 'combat ready.' Canada will also provide appropriate training to Ukrainian forces who will go on to operate these tanks. The first Canadian Leopard 2 tanks had arrived in Poland on 5 February, to allow Ukrainian troops to begin training. On 24 February, the Canadian Prime Minister, Justin Trudeau, announced that Canada would be sending a further four Leopard 2A4 tanks to Ukraine along with one armoured recovery vehicle (ARV) and 5,000 rounds of ammunition.

===== Czech Republic =====
On 20 January 2023, the Czech Defense Ministry issued a statement that the media reports indicating the Czech Republic and Slovakia were willing to give up their Leopard 2 tanks for Ukraine were false, and that rumors that the Czech Republic would receive American Abrams tanks in exchange for Leopards were also false. As of December 2022, both countries had only received one Leopard 2A4 each from Rheinmetall as part of Germany's Ringtausch program in exchange for them delivering older Soviet equipment to Ukraine, while the remaining Leopard 2A4s are still being refurbished (expected to be delivered throughout 2023).

===== Denmark =====
While it was reported in the international press that Denmark had signalled that it could contribute a number of tanks, there was no official indication from the Danish Government that any Danish Leopard 2s would be sent to Ukraine. Of the Danish inventory of 44 tanks, 14 were deployed to Estonia as part of NATO EFP, with a further number receiving upgrades at the German manufacturers. Some Danish opposition politicians voiced support for a transfer of Danish tanks. Unlike those considered by other countries, the Danish Leopards are of the new 2A7 standard, which would represent some logistic and mechanical challenges compared to the other variants. Denmark instead announced on 7 February that it was jointly purchasing 100-178 Leopard 1A5 tanks with Germany and the Netherlands. Denmark also announced on 20 April 2023 that they would jointly finance with the Netherlands the purchase and refurbishing of 14 Leopard 2A4 for Ukraine from private industry stocks.

===== Finland =====
Finland had suggested before the German decision on reexport, that it could supply Ukraine with a limited number of Leopard 2 tanks. The Finnish President, Sauli Niinistö, warned that "the number of tanks [to be sent to Ukraine] cannot be large, since Finland borders on Russia and is not part of NATO [yet]." On 23 February Finland announced it will give three of its six Leopard 2R breaching tanks to Ukraine. The donation of the remaining three was announced a month later.

===== Greece =====
On 25 January 2023 it was reported that Greece was one of the countries that had indicated it would supply Leopard 2 tanks to Ukraine. On 29 January 2023 it was erroneously reported that approximately 14 Leopard 2 tanks would be provided, though it was unclear if it would be the 2A4 or 2A6 HEL variant. However, on 31 January, Greek Prime Minister Kyriakos Mitsotakis clarified that Greece would not supply any Leopard tanks to Ukraine, arguing "they are absolutely necessary for our defense posture." Leaked Pentagon documents revealed that Greece was preparing to donate five of its Leopard 2 tanks to Ukraine, though Greek defense minister Nikolaos Panayiotopoulos reiterated later in April his government's opposition to tank deliveries to Ukraine, making confirmation of the delivery uncertain.

===== Netherlands =====
The Netherlands was considering Ukrainian requests for Leopard 2 tanks, with Prime Minister Mark Rutte suggesting that the Dutch government could purchase tanks from other countries and donate them. There were also some discussions about Netherlands purchasing the 18 Leopard 2A6 tanks they lease from Germany. No refusal was made from Germany to sell them as no formal request to buy them was made; both countries agreed that they were critical to the operations of the joint German-Dutch military unit. However, the Netherlands agreed to supply ammunition for Leopard tanks and announced it had not abandoned its intention to contribute to the tank initiative, while also noting it was helping to purchase Leopard 1A5 tanks with Denmark and Germany. The Netherlands later announced it was jointly financing with Denmark the purchase and refurbishing of 14 Leopard 2A4 for Ukraine from private industry stocks, with delivery expected in early 2024.

===== Norway =====
On 25 January 2023, Norway pledged to donate spare Leopards to Ukraine with reports speculating that between four and eight of its 36 Leopard 2A4 tanks would be sent. Norwegian defence minister Bjørn Arild Gram said in an interview with Norwegian public television NRK: "Norway and the government support the donation of battle tanks to Ukraine. Norway will take part," but did not specify how many would be sent. On 14 February 2023, Gram announced that 8 Norwegian Leopard 2 tanks and 4 Leopard 1 derived "special purpose vehicles" would be handed over to Ukraine. The special purpose vehicles turned out to be a mix of 3 NM189 AEVs and 1 NM217 ARV. In February 2023, Norway ordered 54 Leopard 2A7 tanks (later changed to 2A8 variant) to be delivered from 2026, with a further option for 18 vehicles if necessary.

===== Portugal =====
When the German government changed its position on the reexport of Leopard 2 tanks, it was reported that the Portuguese government was preparing to send four of their Leopard 2A6 tanks to Ukraine. On 4 February, Prime Minister António Costa confirmed that Portugal would send Leopards to Ukraine, but did not confirm the number of vehicles set to be delivered. It is understood that Portugal is working with Germany to obtain the necessary parts to repair inoperable tanks in its inventory of 37 Leopard 2 tanks, but it has been widely reported by local media that most are inoperable. Costa expressed hopes that Portuguese tanks would be delivered by March 2023. On 14 February, it was reported that Portugal had earmarked three Leopard 2A6 tanks for donation to Ukraine. All three were confirmed donated on 27 March together with the 18 German Leopard 2A6.

===== Slovakia =====
On 25 January 2023, Slovakia announced it was not considering the transfer of any of its Leopard 2A4 tanks to Ukraine, but were willing to provide T-72 tanks if other allies replaced them with other tanks. The reason cited for this was that Slovakia had only received 1 of the 15 Leopard tanks it was promised as part of Germany's Ringtaush program, which it was getting in exchange for supplying Ukraine with 30 Soviet-era infantry fighting vehicles.

===== Spain =====
On 4 June 2022 it was reported that Spain was considering providing 40 of its 53 retired Leopard 2A4 tanks stored in Zaragoza. On 8 June German Chancellor Olaf Scholz denied receiving any formal request from Spain for an export permit for Leopard 2 tanks to Ukraine. However it was later confirmed on 10 June by the Spanish defense minister they were considering the transfer. On 12 June, anonymous government sources told Der Spiegel that the Scholz government blocked any transfer of Leopard tanks to Ukraine, arguing this "would constitute a departure" from an informal NATO decision not to provide Western tanks at that time. By 2 August, Spain officially backtracked on its decision, arguing the tanks at Zaragoza were in "deplorable condition" and that it could not send any.

The Spanish government was later reported to be considering to send an unconfirmed number of Spanish Leopard 2E tanks to Ukraine in January 2023 following a meeting of the Ukraine Defense Contact Group. On 14 February the Spanish defence minister Margarita Robles confirmed Spain was providing training to 55 Ukrainian tank crew members and technicians on the Leopard 2. On 22 February, Robles also confirmed that Spain was in the process of preparing six Leopard 2A4 tanks for delivery to Ukraine by late March or early April. On 5 February 2023, it was reported that at least 11 of the 53 tanks stored at Zaragoza had been drawn out of storage to be refurbished and upgraded to have "the same lethality" as modern versions of the Leopard 2 before being sent to Ukraine. Five were sent to the Santa Bárbara Sistemas plant in Alcalá de Guadaira and six had already been moved to Seville for diagnostics and repairs. The Ministry of Defence had not published the contracts for the retrofits out of secrecy. It was unclear however if ammunition would be supplied with the tanks as Spain only has 9 rounds for each of its Leopard 2E tanks. On 23 February Spanish Prime Minister Pedro Sánchez confirmed during a visit to Kyiv that Spain was sending at least 10 Leopard 2 tanks to Ukraine.

===== Sweden =====
Sweden began considering Ukrainian requests for Leopard 2 tanks in January 2023 and did not rule out contributing its Strv 122 at a later stage. On 24 February, the Swedish minister of defence Pål Jonson announced that Sweden would be providing 10 Strv 122 tanks to Ukraine.

=== Beyond Europe ===
In 2005, Turkey ordered 298 Leopard 2 tanks from German army stocks. The Leopard 2 was chosen in 2001 after successfully competing one year earlier in the Turkish army trials against the T-84 Yatagan, Leclerc and a version of the M1A2 Abrams fitted with a German MTU diesel engine. Turkey wanted to buy 1,000 Leopard 2 tanks in 1999, but the German government rejected the deal.

Singapore bought 96 Leopard 2 tanks from Germany in 2006. Chile bought 172 ex-German Leopard 2A4 tanks and 273 Marder 1A3 IFVs in 2007.

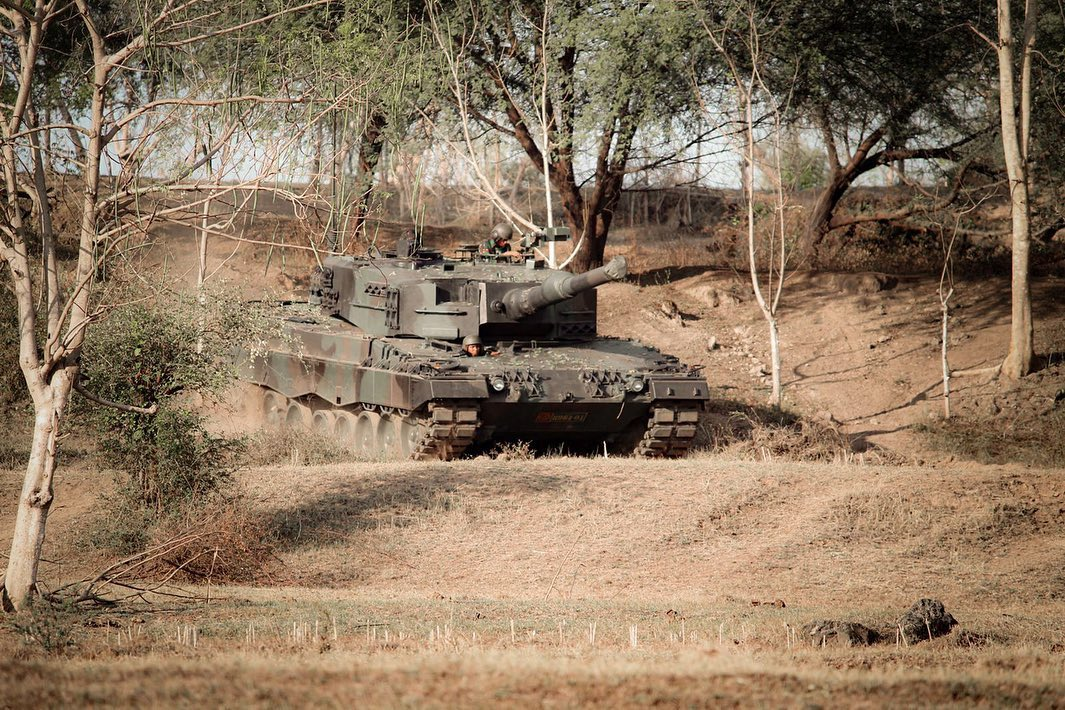
An Indonesian Army Leopard 2A4+ of the 8th Cavalry Battalion

Indonesia ordered 103 Leopard 2 tanks and 42 Marder 1A3 IFVs in 2013. At first, the export of heavy weapons to Indonesia was not allowed by the German government, due to the questionable human rights record of Indonesia. 61 of the 103 Leopard 2 tanks will be upgraded by Rheinmetall to the Leopard 2RI standard, based on Rheinmetall's Revolution modular upgrade concept.

Qatar ordered 62 Leopard 2A7 tanks and 24 Panzerhaubitze 2000s in 2013. The delivery of the tanks started in late 2015 and the first tanks were displayed on a military parade in December 2015.

== Combat history ==
=== KFOR ===
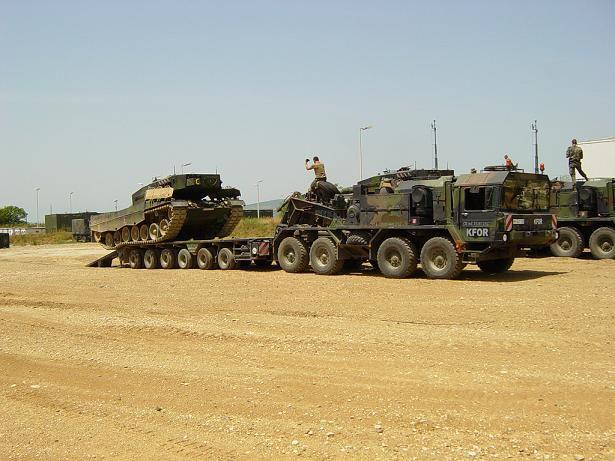
A German Leopard 2A4 being unloaded from a SLT 50 Elefant tank transporter in Kosovo, July 2002

Starting on 12 June 1999, 28 Leopard 2A5 tanks were deployed to Kosovo by the German Army as part of the Kosovo Force (KFOR). The vehicles of Panzerbataillon 33 and 214 were sent from North Macedonia to Prizren. They were used for patrols, protecting checkpoints and bases as well as part of the show of force. On 13 June 1999, two members of the Serbian paramilitary started firing from inside a Fiat 125p car at one of the checkpoints in Prizren and both were killed by return fire. A Leopard 2A5 was located at the checkpoint, but it could not participate in the fighting as it was only partially crewed.

On 26 June 1999, a Leopard 2A5 fired four warning shots above the town of Orahovac. From late 2000 to early 2001, the tanks were replaced by the Leopard 2A4 model. Leopard 2A4s were deployed to North Macedonia in 2001 as part of the NATO intervention. The tanks served to protect Bundeswehr logistic sites in North Macedonia. Until their return in 2004, the Leopard 2 tanks were stationed at the Austrian-Swiss camp "Casablanca".

=== IFOR/SFOR ===
The Dutch contingent in Bosnia-Herzegovina operated Leopard 2 tanks. Dutch Leopard 2A4s and Leopard 2A5s were stationed at the NLD bases at Bugojno, Novi Travnik, Sisava, Knezevo, Maslovare and Suica.

=== ISAF/OEF ===
In October 2003, Canada was planning to replace its Leopard C2s with wheeled Stryker Mobile Gun Systems. However, operational experience in Afghanistan and in particular during Operation Medusa, convinced the Canadian military of the usefulness of maintaining a tank fleet. Leopard C2s were deployed to Kandahar in December 2006, but they were by then almost 30 years old, and were nearing the end of their operational life. The Canadian government decided to borrow 20 Leopard 2A6s and three armoured recovery vehicles from Germany for rapid deployment to Afghanistan. In late August 2007, the first Leopard 2s were airlifted into Afghanistan to equip Lord Strathcona's Horse (Royal Canadians).

In an assault on 2 November 2007, a Leopard 2A6M hit an improvised explosive device (IED) and survived without casualties: "My crew stumbled upon an IED (improvised explosive device) and made history as the first (crew) to test the (Leopard 2A6) M-packet. It worked as it should", wrote a Canadian officer in an email to German defence officials. Canadian Chief of the Defence Staff General Rick Hillier denied reports that a Leopard 2 tank that was struck by an IED was a write-off, insisting that the tank has been repaired and is once again in use. "The Taliban have been engaged with some of the new Leopard 2 tanks in several ambushes" and that as a result the Taliban "learned some very harsh lessons" and lost the battle in question "very quickly and very violently."

In October 2007, Denmark deployed Leopard 2A5 DKs in support of operations in southern Afghanistan. The Danish tank unit, drawn from the first battalion of the Jydske Dragonregiment (Jutland Dragoons Regiment), was equipped with three tanks and one M113 armoured personnel carrier, with an armoured recovery vehicle and another tank kept in reserve. The Danish version of the Leopard 2A5 is fitted with Swedish-made Barracuda camouflage mats that limit the absorption of solar heat, thus reducing infrared signature and interior temperature. It also has a conventional driver's seat bolted on the floor of the tank, whereas in the Canadian 2A6M (as part of the mine-protection package) the driver's seat has been replaced by a "dynamic safety seat", which is a parachute-harness like arrangement that the driver wears around his hip. This way, the driver does not have any contact with the hull except on the pedals and is out of the shockwave area of exploding land mines or IEDs.

In January 2008, Danish tanks halted a flanking manoeuvre by Taliban forces near the Helmand River by providing gunfire in support of Danish and British infantry from elevated positions. On 26 February 2008, a Danish Leopard 2 was hit by an explosive device, damaging one track. No one was injured and the tank returned to camp on its own for repairs. The first fatality suffered by a crew operating a Leopard 2 happened on 25 July 2008. A Danish Leopard 2A5 hit an IED in Helmand Province. The vehicle was able to continue 200 m (660 ft) before it halted. Three members of the four-person crew were able to escape even though wounded, but the driver was stuck inside. Onsite treatment by Danish medics could not save him. The vehicle was towed to Forward Operating Base (FOB) Attal and then later to FOB Armadillo for investigation and possible redeployment. During the same contact with Taliban forces, a second tank was caught in an explosion but none of the crew were wounded.

Beginning on 7 December 2008, Leopard 2 tanks took part in Operation Red Dagger, firing 31 rounds in support of Coalition troops as they recaptured Nad Ali District. A press release from the British Ministry of Defence praised the tank's fire accuracy and mobility, claiming the Leopard 2 was a decisive factor in the coalition's success.

=== Turkish intervention in Syria ===
Turkey operates 354 Leopard 2A4 tanks. Initially using other tank types including upgraded M60s, in December 2016 Turkey deployed a number of Leopard 2A4s to the Syrian Civil War against Islamic State of Iraq and the Levant (ISIS) as part of Operation Euphrates Shield. Initially, three of the Turkish Leopard 2A4s operating in Syria were destroyed or damaged by ISIS using anti-tank missile systems (possibly Fagot or Konkurs anti-tank guided missiles obtained from Syrian or Iraqi Army captured stocks). In mid-December 2016, two 2A4 tanks were captured by ISIS near al-Bab city in Syria during Euphrates Shield operations. Amaq News Agency posted video of vehicles claimed to be captured Leopard 2A4s.

By late December 2016, ISIS had captured or incapacitated 10 Leopard 2A4s. These were damaged by anti-tank weapons, IEDs, or other unknown causes. Additional ISIS propaganda images and video depicting several completely destroyed Leopards, some with their turrets blown off, were published in January 2017. The 'turret blown off' effect was potentially caused by a quirk of the Leopard's design, with only 15 rounds being stored in blow-out panel compartments (27 other rounds stored in the forward section of the hull, to the left of the driver's station, they were cause to catastrophic secondary explosions).

Tanks which suffered the worst damage may have been destroyed by airstrikes in order to prevent capture but sources generally state that the damage was caused solely with anti-tank missiles or car bombs driven by suicide bombers.

In January 2017, the German newspaper Die Welt reported that ISIL fighters used 9M133 Kornet anti-tank missiles to destroy six Leopard 2 tanks used by the Turkish military in Syria.

At least eight Leopard 2 MBT have been destroyed according to photographic reports.

Turkey also confirmed the use of Leopard 2A4 tanks during the Turkish military operation in Afrin to the German government. These tanks were designed during the Cold War to fight against Soviet tanks in Europe, not counterinsurgencies against guerrillas, where the primary risk is improvised explosive devices and anti-tank missiles. These tanks were retired from German usage when sold to Turkey.

There is a belief that the Turkish purchase of Leopard 2A4s from Germany was subject to the condition that they were not to be used against Kurdish separatists. Prior to 2016, the Leopard 2A4s were kept in northern Turkey. Once the German government discovered that the Leopard tanks were being used against Kurdish forces, planned upgrades to make them "less vulnerable to explosives" were halted. Ultimately Turkey was forced to upgrade the Leopard 2A4s with domestic components, including a possible replacement of the original turret with that of the Turkish Altay main battle tank.

=== Russo-Ukrainian War ===
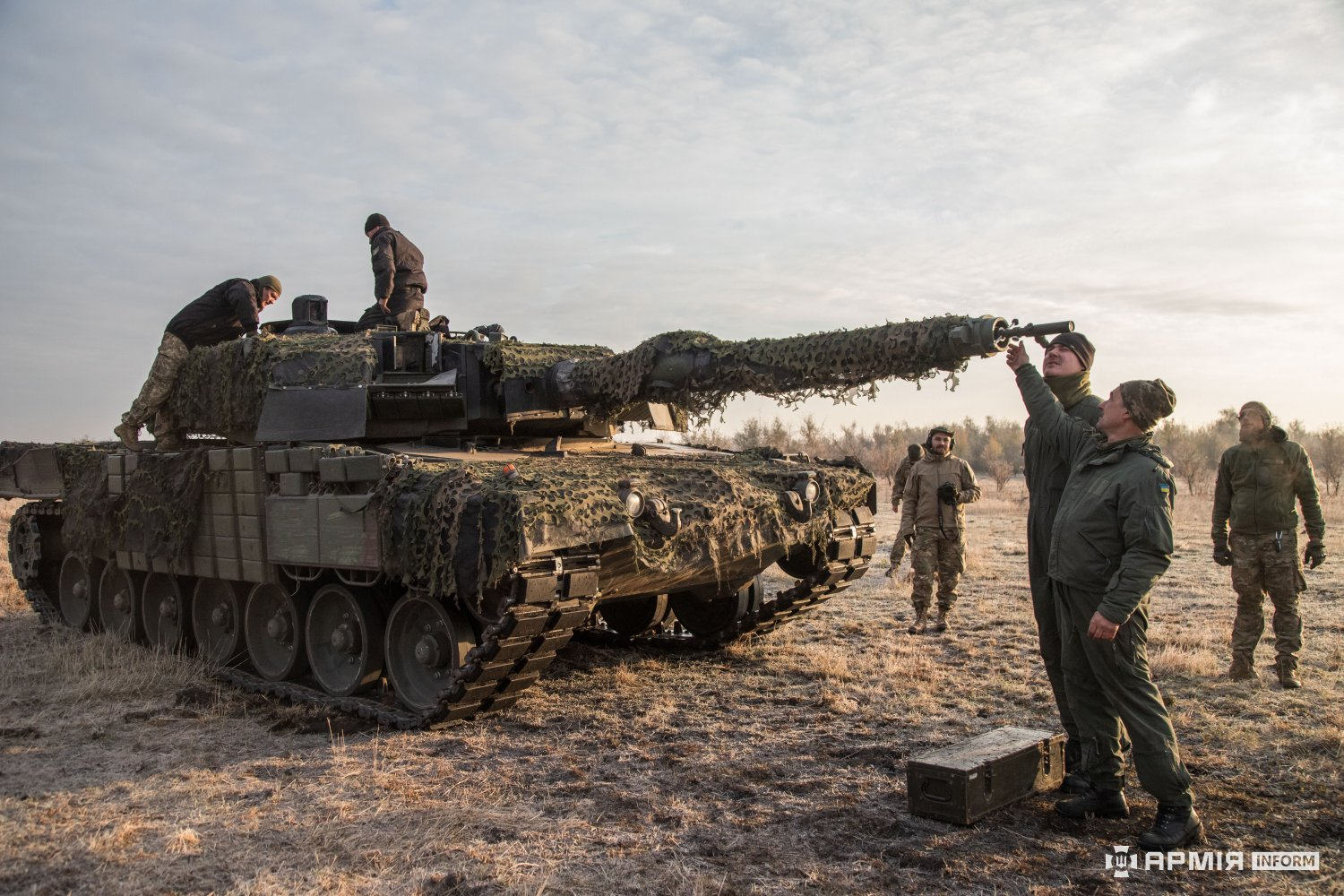
Leopard 2A4 in service with the Ukrainian 33rd Mechanized Brigade. The tank has been modified with Kontakt-1 explosive reactive armour.

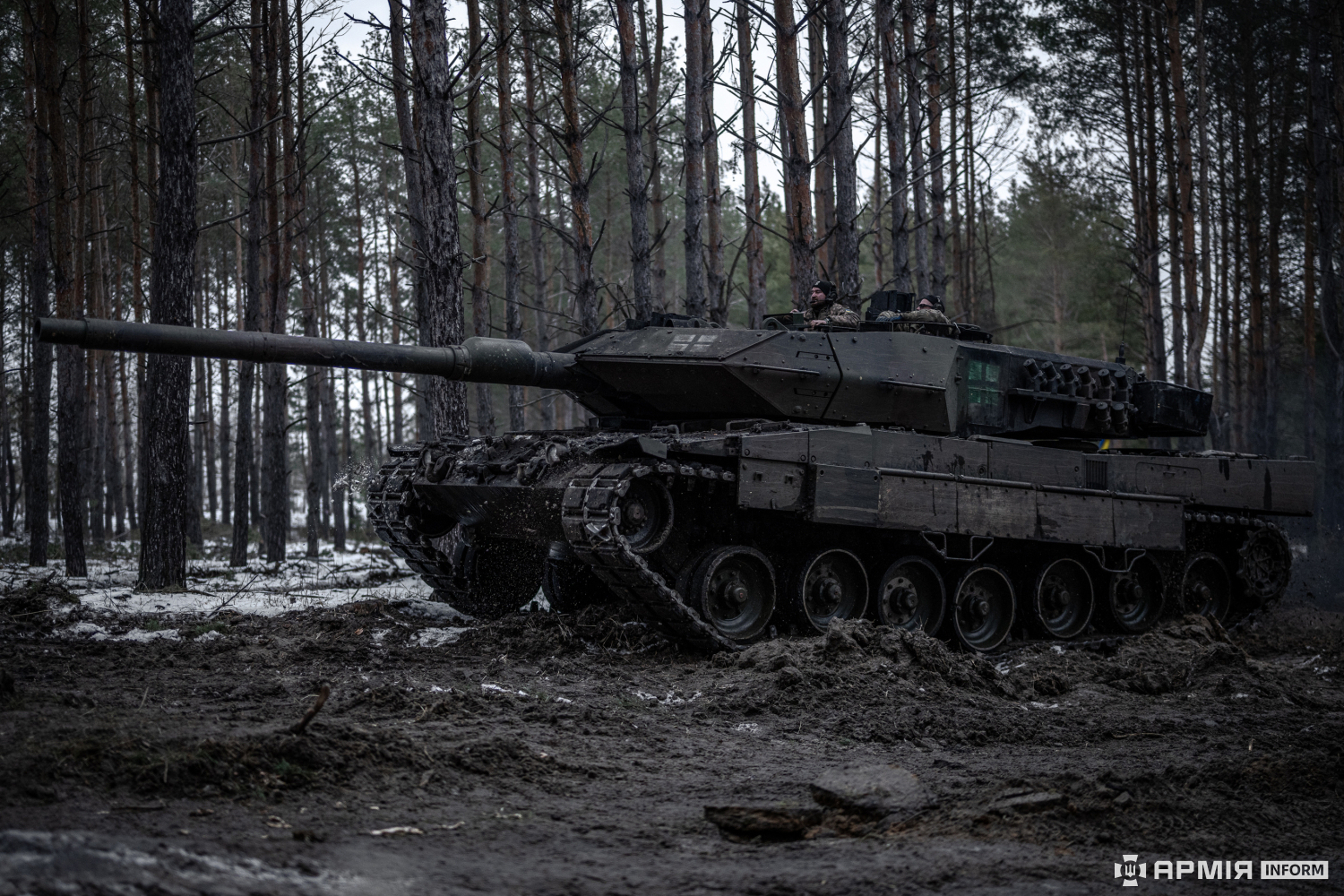
Ukrainian Leopard 2A6

In April 2023, during training of a Ukrainian crew a Leopard 2A4 was damaged with its turret being completely dislodged from the hull. The crew was reported as fine. In July 2023, a Leopard 2A4 was modified to carry Kontakt-1 ERA on the sides of the hull and the turret. It was also shown with rubber screens attached to the turret and gun mantel.

Beginning in June 2023, Ukraine deployed Leopard 2s during the Russo-Ukrainian War against Russia in preparation for their 2023 counteroffensive. During Ukrainian attacks in Zaporizhzhia Oblast on 8 June 2023, a Russian artillery strike on a Ukrainian vehicle column at Novopokrovka destroyed at least one Leopard 2A4 tank. Additionally, more Russian drone footage from the same day and days after showed four Leopard 2A6 tanks and three Leopard 2Rs damaged or destroyed south the road of Mala Tokmachka.

On 28 August 2023, Russia's Defense Minister Sergey Shoigu claimed that Russian forces had destroyed or damaged all 16 Leopard 2A4 tanks supplied to Ukraine by Poland and Portugal.

On October 30, 2023, a video showed one Strv 122 tank being hit and penetrated by a 9M133 Kornet. The crew was seen escaping/abandoning a destroyed vehicle.

On 4 October 2023, according to Forbes, Ukrainian forces managed to recover at least one Strv 122 and send it for repair.

On 22 October 2024, Leopard 2A4 of the 33rd Mechanized Brigade reportedly engaged and destroyed two Russian Armoured Personnel Carriers according to social media footage in Kurakhove sector, Pokrovsk.

On 11 November 2024, at least one Leopard 2A4 of the 33rd Mechanized Brigade engaged a Russian armoured column near Dalnje, just south of Kurakhove, allegedly destroying two Russian tanks, an armoured personnel carrier and damaging several other vehicles. The Russian column was led by two "turtle tanks" fitted with bulky anti-drone armour.

As of 1 July 2025, according to the analysis of photos, videos and other visual evidence performed and reported in the Oryx blog, at least 24 Ukrainian Leopard 2s of various models were destroyed (13 Leopard 2A4/2A4V, 7 Leopard 2A6, 1 Strv 122, 2 Bergepanzer-3, 1 Leopard 2R); while another 31 were confirmed damaged to various degrees or abandoned by their crews or captured by Russians: 14 Leopard 2A4/2A4V (6 damaged, 6 abandoned, 2 captured), 6 Leopard 2A6 (4 damaged, 1 abandoned, 1 captured), 8 Strv 122 (2 damaged, 6 abandoned) and 3 Leopard 2R (2 damaged, 1 abandoned).

== Variants ==
=== Leopard 2 ===
Two German Army Leopard 2A5s demonstrate their deep-wading capabilities.

The baseline Leopard 2, sometimes informally called the "A0" to differentiate it from later versions, was the first series manufactured version. The vehicles were manufactured from October 1979 until March 1982, altogether 380 vehicles. 209 were built by Krauss Maffei and 171 by MaK. The basic equipment consisted of electrical-hydraulic stabiliser WNA-H22, a fire control computer, a laser rangefinder, a wind sensor, a general-purpose telescope EMES 15, a panorama periscope PERI R17, the gunner's primary sight FERO Z18, on the turret roof as well as a computer-controlled tank testing set RPP 1–8. 200 of the vehicles had a low-light enhancer (PZB 200) instead of thermal imaging. Two chassis served as driver training vehicles.

=== Leopard 2A1 ===
Minor modifications and the installation of the gunner's thermal sight were worked into the second batch of 450 vehicles Leopard 2, designated the A1. Krauss-Maffei built 248 (Chassis Nr. 10211 to 10458) and MaK built 202 (Chassis Nr. 20173 to 20347). Deliveries of the 2A1 models started in March 1982 and ended in November 1983. The two most notable changes were the modification of the ammunition racks to be identical to those in the M1A1 Abrams, and redesigned fuel filters that reduce refuelling time.

A third batch of 300 Leopard 2, 165 by Krauss-Maffei (Chassis Nr. 10459 to 10623) and 135 by MaK (Chassis Nr. 20375 to 20509.), was built between November 1983 and November 1984. This batch included more minor changes that were later retrofitted to the earlier 2A1s.

=== Leopard 2A2 ===
This designation was given to upgraded vehicles of the first batch of Leopard 2s, brought up to the standard of the second and third batches. This modernisation gradually replaced the original PZB 200 sights in the first batch with thermal sights for the EMES 15 as they became available. The upgrade included the fitting of filler openings and caps to the forward hull fuel tanks to allow separate refuelling. There was an addition of a deflector plate for the periscope and a large cover plate to protect the existing NBC protection system. The tank was given new five metre towing cables with a different position. The programme began in 1984 and ended in 1987. The third, fourth and fifth batches, which were produced during this period, had the same features. The modernised first batch can be recognised by the circular plate covering the hole where the crosswind sensor for the fire control system was removed.

=== Leopard 2A3 ===
The fourth batch of 300 vehicles, 165 by Krauss-Maffei (Chassis Nr. 10624 to 10788) and 135 by MaK (Chassis Nr. 20510 to 20644), was delivered between December 1984 and December 1985. The main change was the addition of the SEM80/90 digital radio sets (also being fitted to the Leopard 1 at the same time), and the ammunition reloading hatches being welded shut. Even with these minor changes the new batch was known as the 2A3.

=== Leopard 2A4 ===
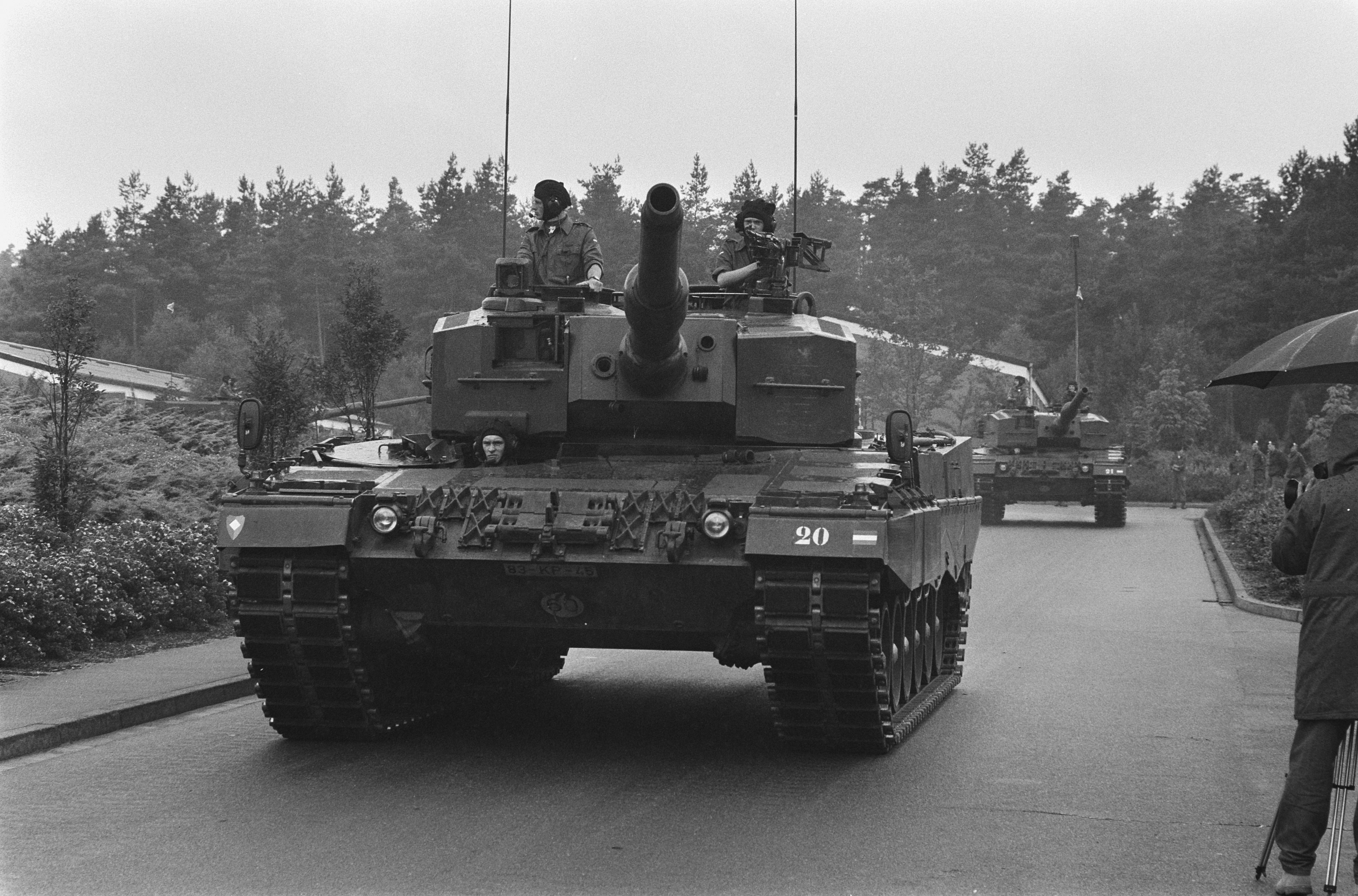
Early Dutch Leopard 2 tanks in 1986

The most widespread version of the Leopard 2 family, the 2A4 models included more substantial changes, including an automated fire and explosion suppression system, an all-digital fire control system able to handle new ammunition types, and an improved turret with flat titanium/tungsten armour. The Leopard 2s were manufactured in eight batches between 1985 and 1992. All the older models were upgraded to 2A4 standard. Until 1994, Germany operated a total of 2,125 2A4s (695 newly built and the rest modified older versions), while the Netherlands had an additional 445 tanks. The 2A4 was licensed and manufactured in Switzerland as the Panzer 87 "Leopard" or Pz 87. This version included Swiss-built 7.5 mm (0.295 in) MG 87 machine guns and communications equipment and featured an improved NBC protection system. Switzerland operated 380 Pz 87 tanks.

After 2000, Germany and the Netherlands found themselves with large stocks of tanks that they had no need for after the Cold War. These tanks were sold to NATO or friendly armies around the world. Among these buyers of the surplus tanks were Turkey (purchasing 354 vehicles), Greece (183), Sweden (leased 160), Chile (140), Finland (139), Poland (128), Austria (114), Spain (108), Canada (107), Indonesia (103), Singapore (96), Norway (52), Denmark (51), and Portugal (37).

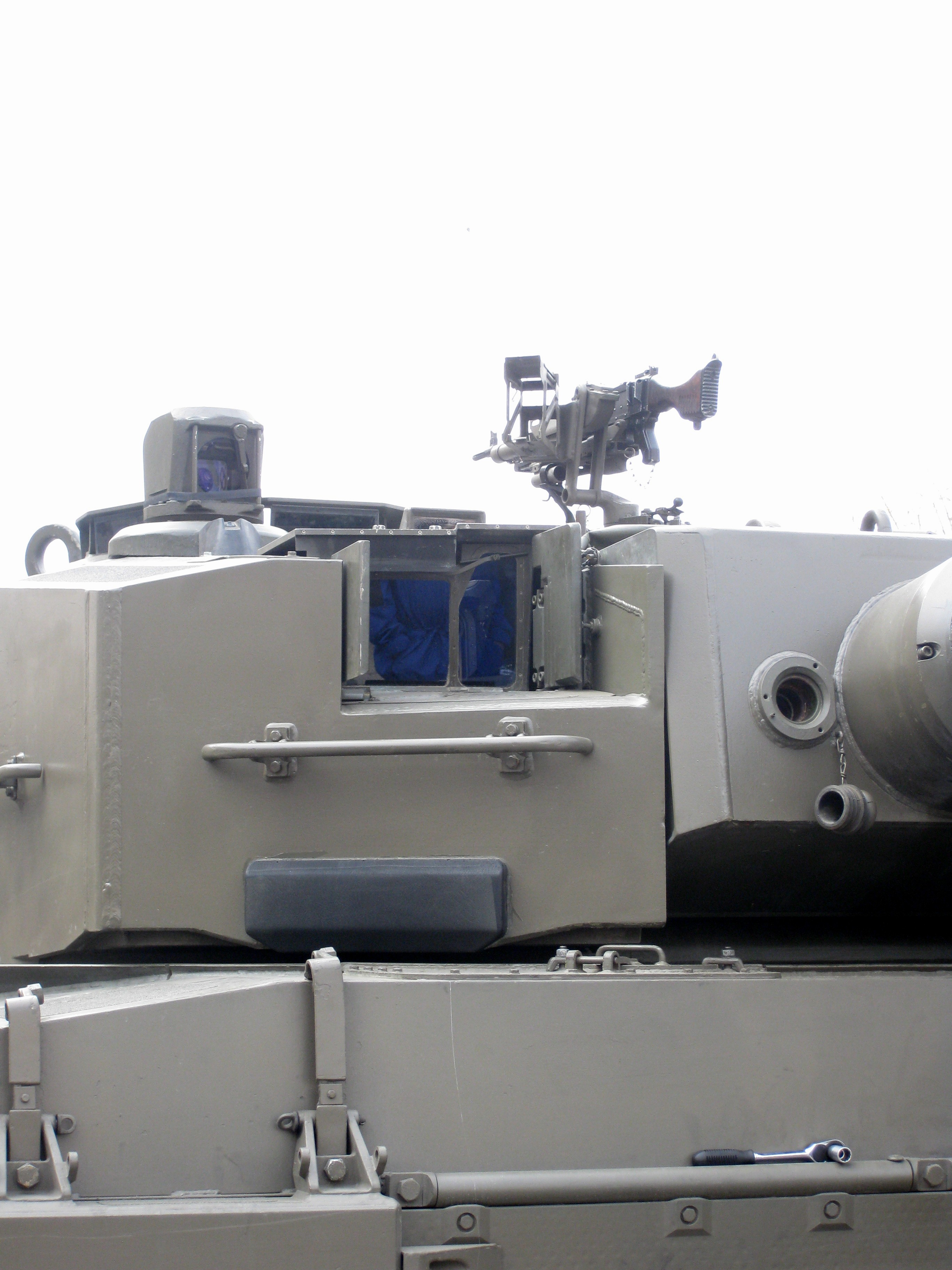
An Austrian Leopard 2A4 gunner's sights

The Pz 87WE (WertErhaltung) is a planned Swiss modification and upgrade of the Pz 87. The modification significantly improves protection through the addition of the Leopard 2A6M's mine protection kit, thicker armour on the front glacis, and a turret equipped with a Swiss-developed armour package using titanium alloy. The turret roof armour is improved and the smoke grenade launchers are redesigned. Further improvements enhance survivability and combat capabilities, such as a turret electric drive similar to the Leopard 2A5, a driver rearview camera, an independent weapons station for the loader, and enhanced command and control systems. The fire control system is upgraded, using the Carl Zeiss Optronics GmbH PERI-R17A2 fire control system. A remote weapons station containing a fully stabilised Mg 64 0.5 in (13 mm) machine gun is fitted to the tank.

The Swiss company RUAG offered an upgrade package for Pz 87 main battle tanks to meet a possible requirement of the Swiss Army for improved protection. It is fitted with a new modular composite armour package. Armour modules can be tailored to provide enhanced protection against a specific threat. Damaged modules can be easily replaced in field conditions. Upgraded tanks are less vulnerable to direct hits, anti-tank missiles, RPG rounds, mines, and IEDs. The vehicle received new sensors such as a sniper detection sensor and a laser warning receiver. In 2021, the two prototypes with add-on armour were handed to the Militär- und Festungsmuseum Full-Reuenthal.

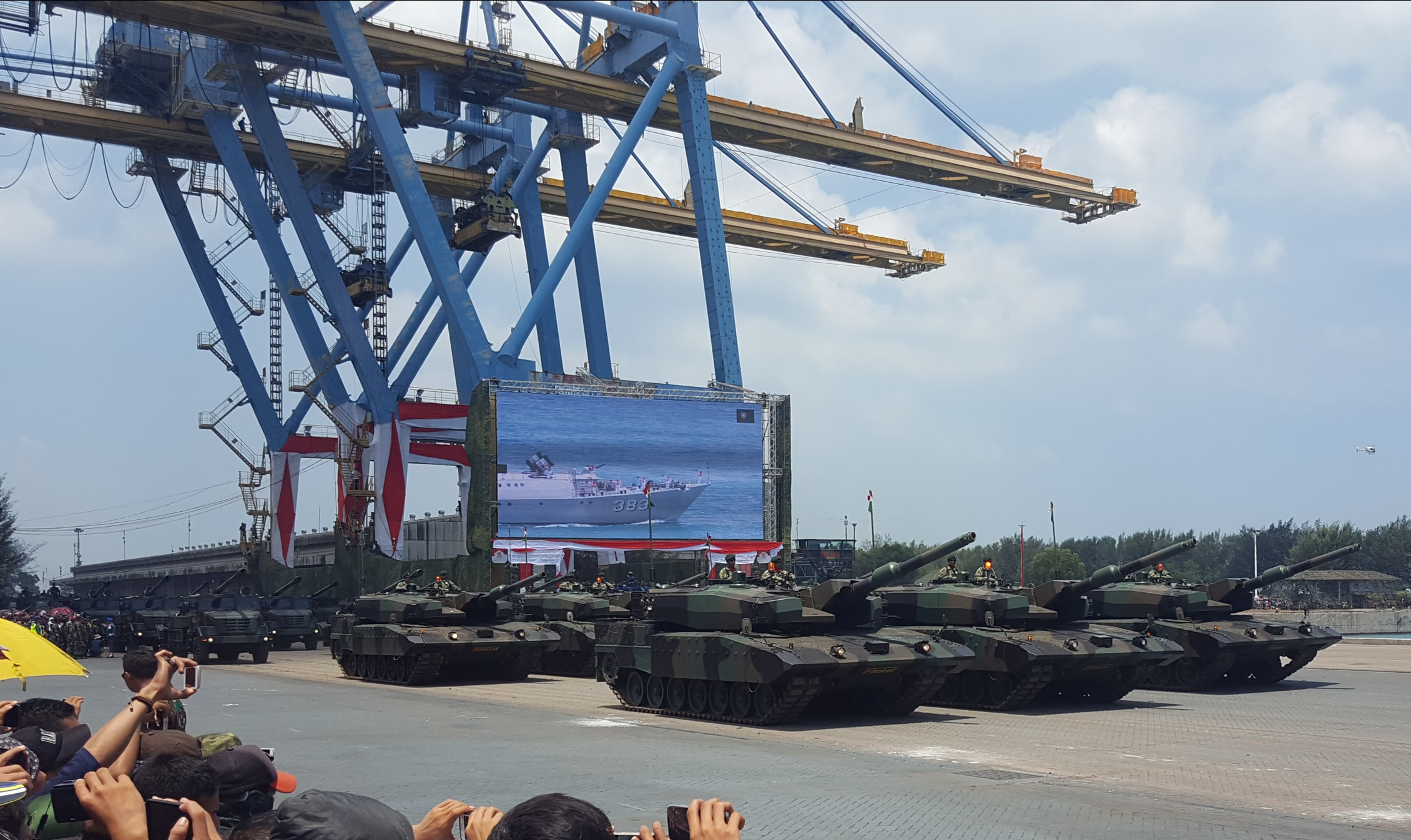
Indonesian Leopard 2RIs during a parade

The Indonesian Army operates the Leopard 2 Republic Indonesia or Leopard 2RI, an upgraded variant based on Rheinmetall's MBT Revolution upgrade for the Leopard 2A4 tank. The upgrade includes AMAP armour from IBD Deisenroth and Rheinmetall Chempro, improved fire control systems, and battlefield management and situational awareness systems.

The Pz 87–140 is an experimental variant of the Swiss Pz 87 with a 140 mm (5.5 in) gun and additional armour, which was later used on the newer production variants.

The Leopard 2A4CHL is the upgraded Chilean version of the Leopard 2A4 ordered by Chile in 2007. Upgrades include new electronics, sighting, and information systems meant to elevate the Leopard 2A4's networking capability to be equal to that of the Leopard 2A6, a new suspension system, and the upgrading of the tank main gun to the L/55 smoothbore cannon used on the Leopard 2A6. Other upgrades are remote weapon stations over the gunner and commander hatches fitted with the MG3 and HK GMG. The Leopard 2A4CHL has improved roof and side turret armour and can be uplinked with Chile's battlefield control network.

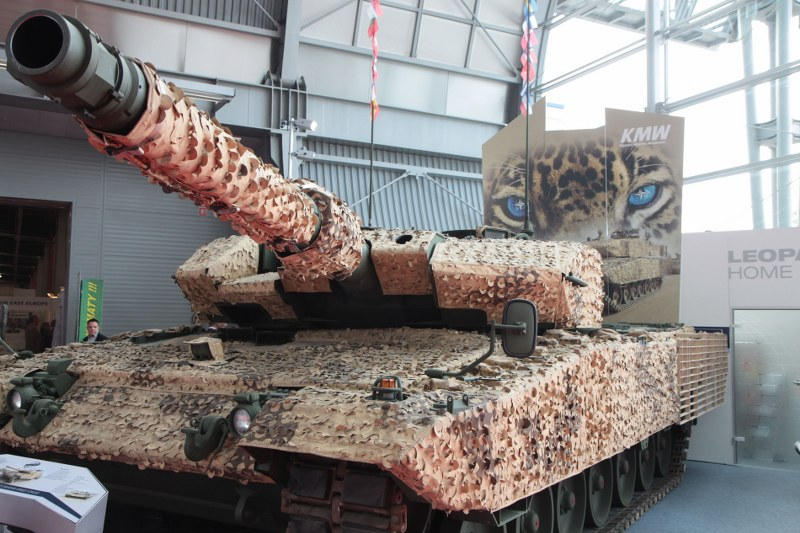
A Leopard 2A4 in Canadian Army configuration, including Saab Barracuda thermal armour

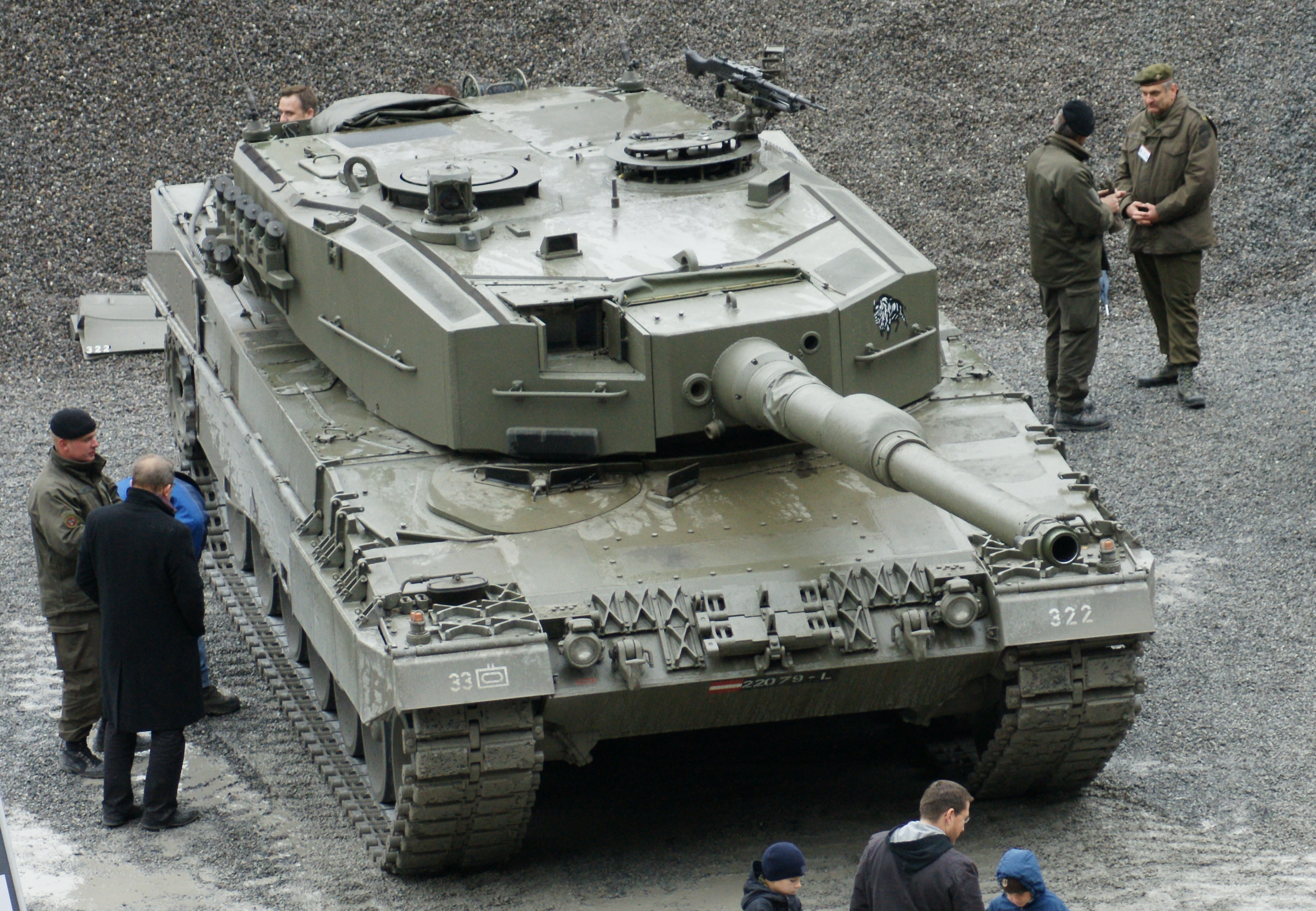
A Leopard 2A4 of the Austrian Armed Forces

The Leopard 2A4M CAN is the upgraded Canadian version of the Leopard 2A4 acquired from the Royal Netherlands Army surplus. The Leopard 2A4M CAN is specially designed for the war in Afghanistan, based on experience gained by Leopard 2 operators. The first 20 were delivered in October 2010. Five were deployed to Afghanistan at the end of 2010 and operated until July 2011, when combat operations stopped. Of the other 2A4s acquired, 11 were converted for training use (nine A4s, two A4Ms). In February 2011, Canada bought 12 2A4s/Pz 87 from Switzerland for the 'Force Mobility Enhancement' project which, along with the remaining unused ex-Dutch tanks, saw 18 converted to Armoured Engineering Vehicles and 4 converted to Armoured Recovery Vehicles. Canada has also purchased 15 2A4s from Germany as Logistic Stock Vehicles (for spare parts).

The Leopard 2NG (Next Generation) is a privately funded Turkish upgrade by ASELSAN that includes the application of AMAP, upgraded optics, completely overhauled turret mechanics, and a new fire control system on the work since 1995 and to be delivered by late 2011, which is intended to be used on the new Altay MBT. It was developed without an order from the Turkish Army, but might meet the requirements for the modernisation of the Turkish Leopard 2A4s. The old powerpack and the L/44 gun barrel are kept, but the combat weight is increased to 65 t (64 long tons; 72 short tons). According to Turkish news sources, Finland was interested in getting the Turkish upgrade package to modernise their fleet of Leopard 2A4s. However, in 2015, Finland purchased 120 2A6 vehicles from the Netherlands.

The Leopard 2 hull was used for the Vickers Mk 7 main battle tank, which featured a British-designed turret, where some of the innovations later were incorporated into the Challenger 2 design.

In December 2015, Bumar-Labedy signed an agreement with German Rheinmetall Landsysteme Gmbh concerning the technological support of the Polish modernisation program for Leopard 2A4 tanks. The company will design, document, and execute six prototypes. The first upgraded Leopard 2PLs have arrived in Poland in June 2020, with all 142 tanks to be delivered by 2023. The upgrades include third generation night vision systems (production of the Warsaw PCO), new additional armour modules and anti-splash lining, removal of flammable components (turret drive system and main propulsion system), installation of the new fire protection system, modernisation of the tank's integrated monitoring and testing equipment, the possibility of using new types of ammunition (programmable DM-11 and DM-63), and an auxiliary generator set (APU). Construction of all 142 units will be completed by the end of 2020.

Turkey is planning to modernise its Leopard 2A4 MBTs as Leopard 2A4TR with the T1 Modernisation Package. According to the Defence Industry Presidency, Leopard 2A4 tanks will be modernised with; Explosive Reactive Armour (ERA), T1 Reactive-Passive Armour, High Ballistic Strength Cage Armour, Hollow Modular Add-on Armour, Close Range Surveillance System (YAMGÖZ), Laser Warning Receiver System (LIAS), SARP Remote Controlled Weapon System (UKSS), PULAT Active Protection System (AKS), a new power distribution unit, ASELSAN Driver Surveillance System (ADİS) and voice alert system integrations. The modernisation programme is to be completed in two batches. The programme will start with 84 Leopard 2A4 tanks in the first batch and the remaining tanks will be modernised within the 2nd batch. A total of 334 tanks (including prototypes) are planned to be upgraded with the T1 modernisation programme. The new modernised Leopard 2A4 that was presented at the BMC factory was fitted with an Altay turret, which is armed with one 120 mm (4.7 in) 55 calibre smoothbore gun designed and manufactured by the Turkish Company MKE, based on a technology transfer from Hyundai Rotem of South Korea. A remote-controlled weapon station is mounted on the top of the turret which is armed with a 12.7 mm (0.50 in) calibre heavy machine gun.

==== Leopard 2A4V ====
On 1 September 2023, video on social media showed Ukrainian crews with 30 Leopard 2A4 upgraded with Kontakt ERA and T-80U style rubber screens, called "Leopard 2A4V" by observers. This followed previous sightings in Ukraine of a Canadian supplied Leopard 2A4 upgraded with Kontakt-1 ERA.

=== Leopard 2 Marksman ===
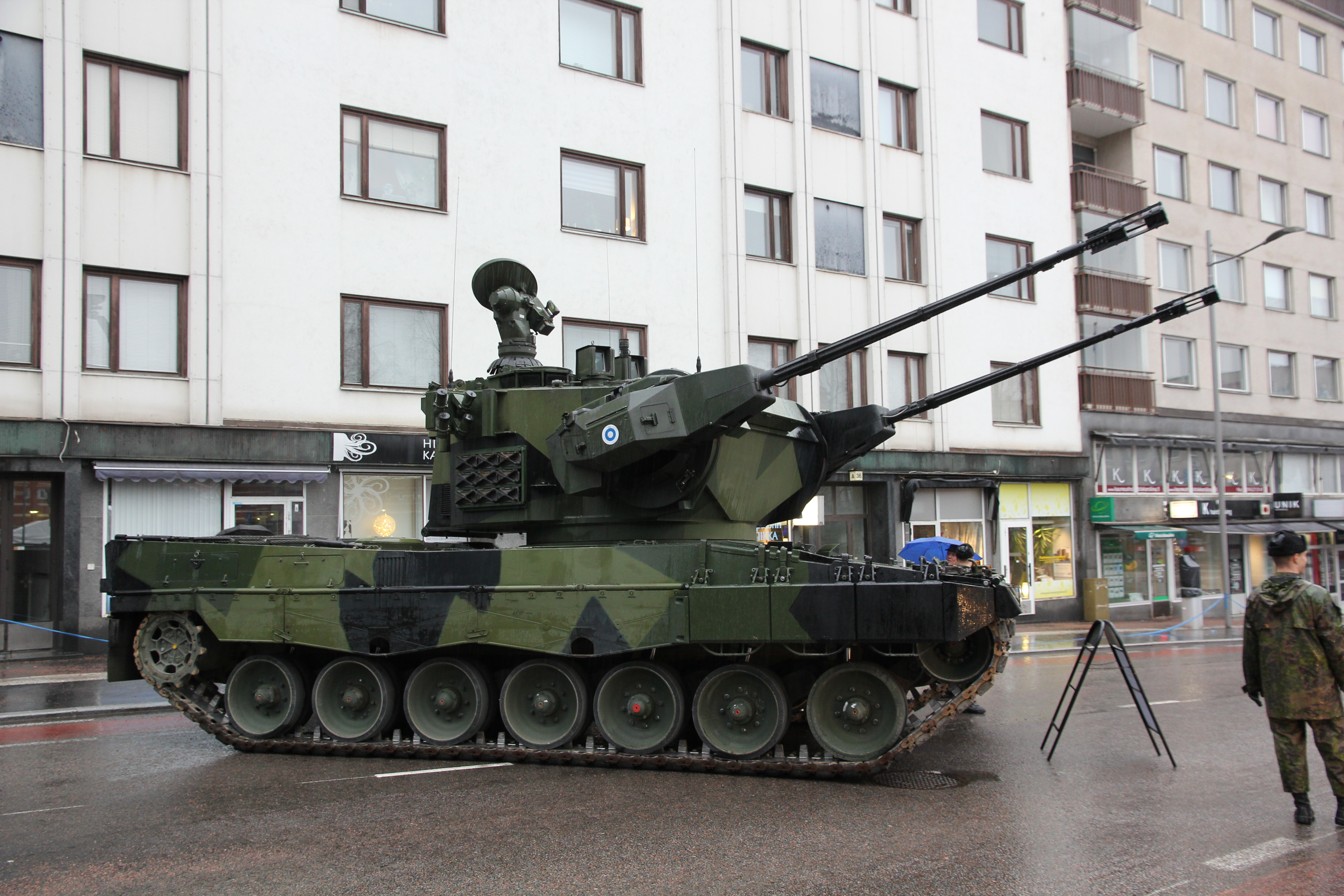
A Leopard 2 Marksman of the Finnish Army

Finland has modernised its Marksman SPAAG vehicles by replacing the original T-55AM chassis with a newer Leopard 2A4 chassis. The upgraded Marksman vehicles were scheduled to enter service with the Finnish Army in 2016. The new Leopard 2 chassis greatly improves mobility compared to the older T-55AM chassis, both on- and off-road. The Leopard 2 chassis is larger, providing a more stable firing platform for the Marksman turret to operate from.

=== Leopard 2 Imp ===
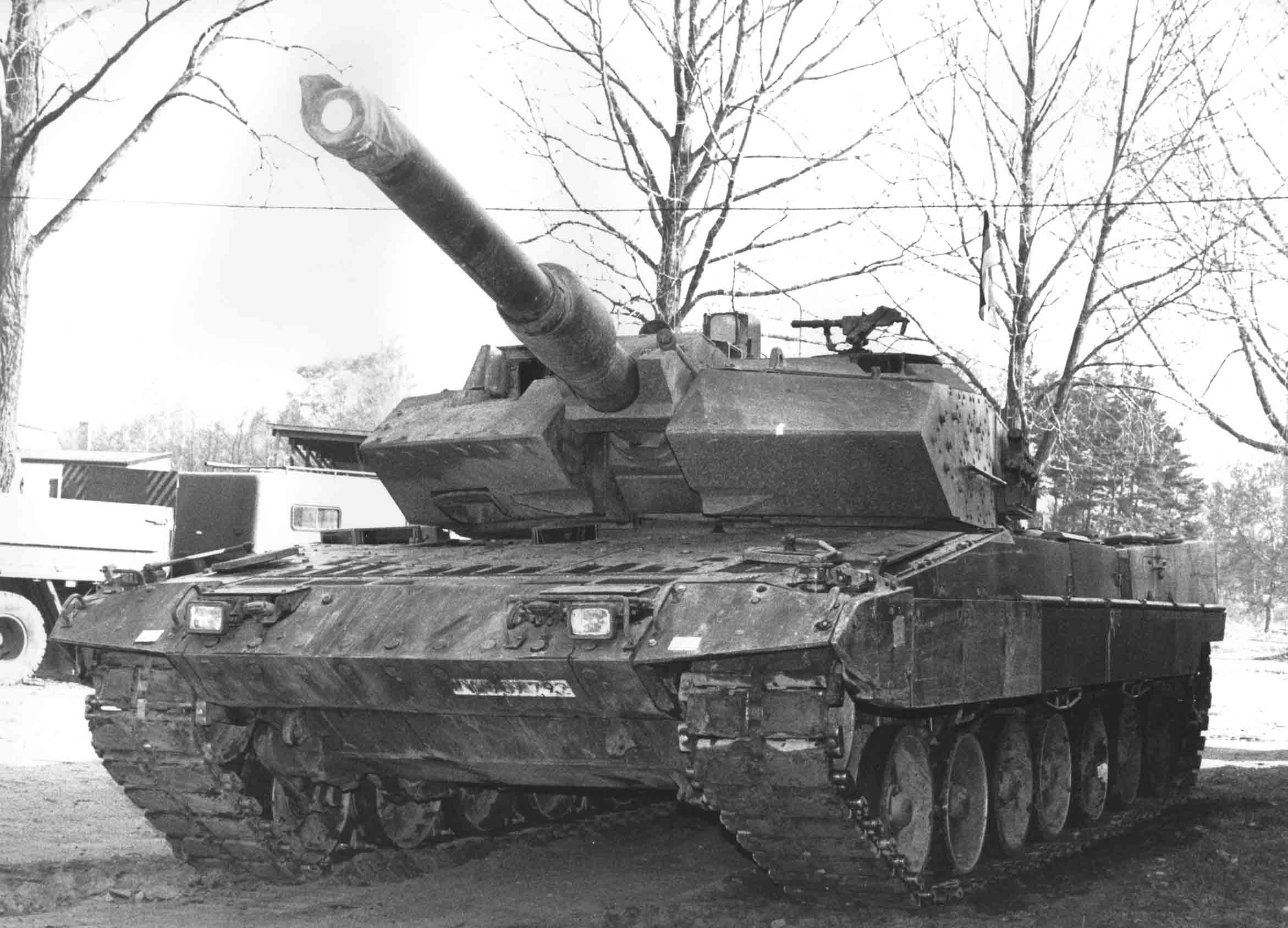
Leopard 2 Improved prototype being tested in Sweden, c. 1993

"Leopard 2 Improved" was a series of three prototypes used to test possible further enhancements beyond the Leopard 2A4 model, developed beginning in 1988. After a concept phase, a component test bed (KVT, Komponentenversuchsträger) was built in 1989, followed by two troop trial vehicles (TVM, Truppenversuchsmuster). The Leopard 2 Improved was mostly focused on improving armour protection, introducing the wedge-shaped, spaced add-on armour at the turret front, as well as hull and roof add-on armour, greatly improving protection against hollow charge and kinetic energy threats. It does not form a shot-trap, since it does not deflect the penetratours outwards to hit the hull or turret ring. The gun mantlet was redesigned to accept the new armour. Aside of improved armour protection, these tanks also included improved optics, navigation systems and electronics.

Following the initial trials of the two TVM prototypes in Germany and an agreement of the Leopard 2 user states, the second TVM prototype was modified (becoming the TVM 2 mod.) by removing several parts such as the add-on hull and roof armour, becoming the basis for the Leopard 2A5 model. One Leopard 2 Improved (TVM 2) competed in Sweden against the Leclerc and M1A2 Abrams, leading to the adoption of the Stridsvagn 122.

=== Leopard 2A5 ===
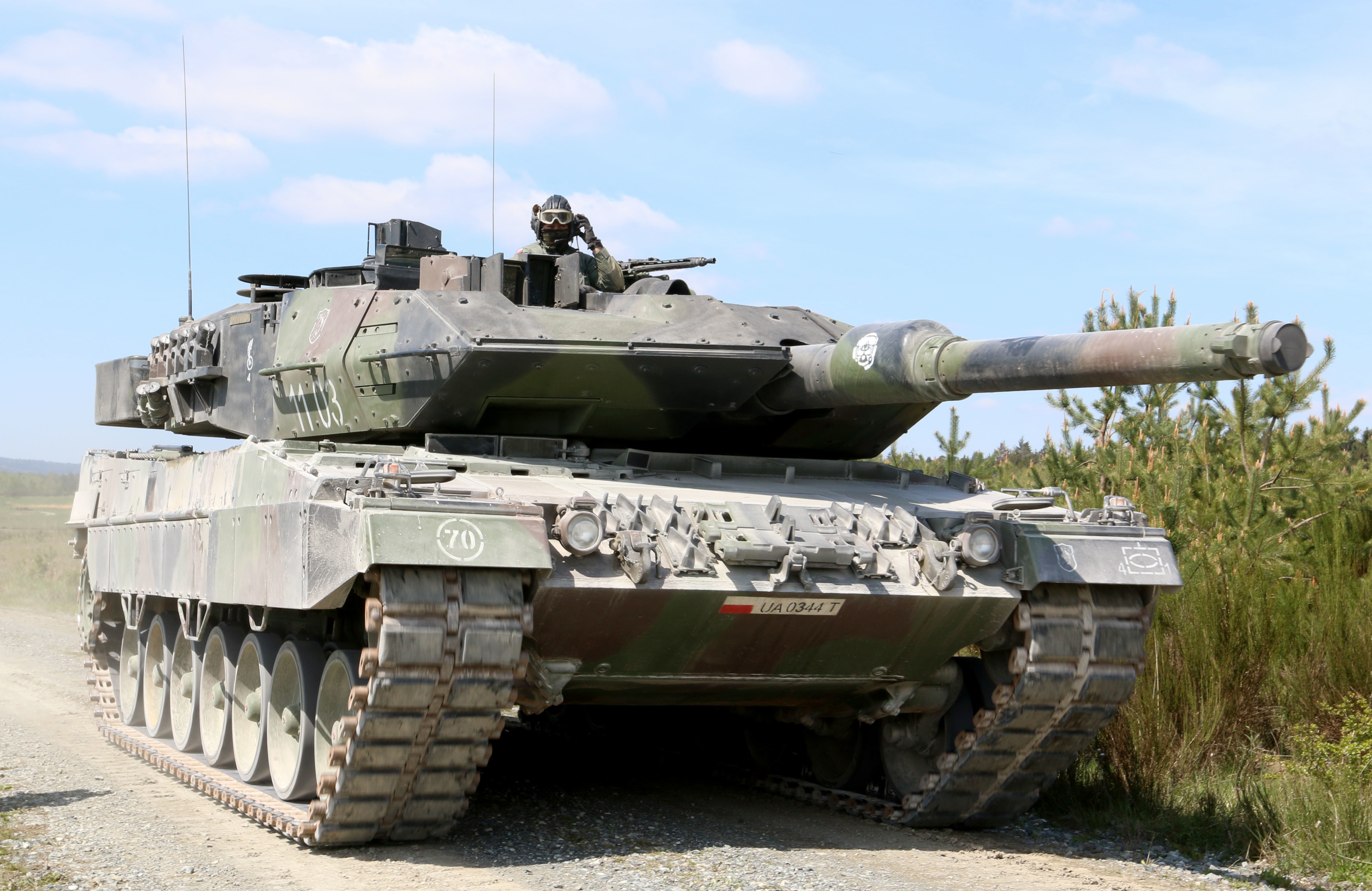
Leopard 2A5 of the Polish Land Forces, 2017

The Leopard 2 Improved was developed into the Leopard 2A5. Most of its improvements were focused on armour protection; it was enhanced by adding external add-on modules to the turret and replacing the turret's internal armour modules with ones of newer, improved composition. The interior received spall liners to reduce fragments if the armour is penetrated. The commander's sight was moved to a new position behind the hatch and it received an independent thermal channel. The gunner's sight was moved to the turret roof as opposed to the cavity in the front armour in previous models. A heavier sliding driver's hatch was fitted.

The hydraulic turret drives were replaced by an all-electric system, increasing reliability and crew safety, as well as weight savings. The gun braking system was improved to prepare for the later mounting of the new L/55 gun tube and to enable firing of more powerful ammunition, such as the DM53 APFSDS. The first A5s were handed over to the German army tank school in 1995 and started to enter regular service with Panzerbataillon 33 in December the same year.

The Leopard 2A5 DK is a variant of the Leopard 2A5 similar to the Leopard 2A6 with some small modifications, used by the Danish Army.

==== Stridsvagn 122 ====
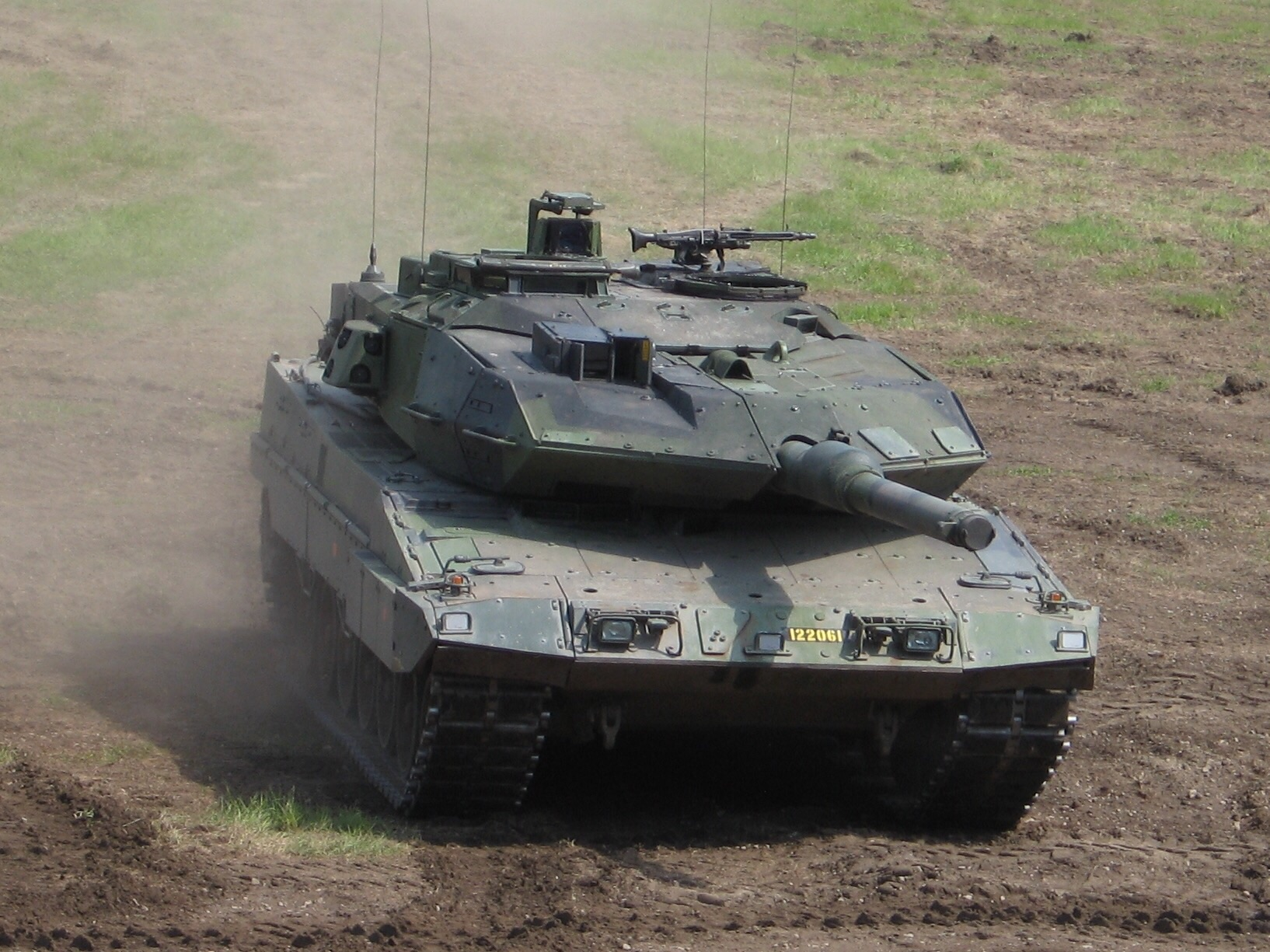
A Stridsvagn 122 of the Swedish Army

Stridsvagn 122 (also known as Leopard 2A5S and Leopard 2 "Improved" A5 SE ) is a Swedish Army tank based on the Leopard 2 Improved. 120 units were built, 91 of which were licence-produced in Sweden. The tank features increased armour on the turret top and front hull, and improved command-, control- and fire-control systems. Externally, it can be distinguished from the Leopard 2A5 by the French GALIX smoke dispensers, different storage bins, and the much thicker crew hatches. The Strv 122B+ Evolution, a variant equipped with modular AMAP composite armour from IBD Deisenroth, has increased 360° protection against threats like EFPs, RPGs and IEDs. The width of 4 metres (13 ft) has been kept, while the weight increases by only 350 kilograms (770 lb).

=== Leopard 2-140 ===
In the early 1990s, Rheinmetall began development of a 140 mm (5.5 in) smoothbore cannon for use in future tank designs. The new gun was intended to counter new Soviet tank developments, especially since the next generation of Soviet main battle tanks were rumoured to be armed with a 135 mm (5.3 in) or 152 mm (6.0 in) cannon. The new 140 mm (5.5 in) cannon was part of a modernisation programme for the Leopard 2 known as the KWS III. Test firing of the new 140 mm (5.5 in) cannon was conducted. Results showed that the gun had high penetration values, and had a muzzle velocity of around 2,000 metres a second, with potential to be increased further. However, the 140 mm (5.5 in) rounds were too heavy for the tank crew to handle effectively.

The KWS III upgrade was to feature a new turret. This new turret was equipped with the planned 140 mm (5.5 in) cannon and an autoloader. The introduction of an autoloader reduced the tank's crew to three members, as a dedicated loader was no longer needed. The gun's 32 rounds of ammunition were stored separate from the crew in a large compartment occupying the entire rear of the turret, in order to increase crew survivability in the event of a cook off. The turntable-style turret had the gun offset to the left side, due to the autoloader's lateral feeding of ammunition into the cannon breech. The turret was powered by an electro-hydraulic drive and featured an IFIS battlefield management system. The crew was protected by an armoured capsule and ballistic protection for the hull was to be improved. The planned protection level of the KWS III upgrade was to be equal to or better than the Leopard 2A5.

A total of 650 Leopard 2 KWS III tanks were originally projected to be purchased. However, in 1995, the KWS III programme was cancelled due to changes in the political environment.

Despite this, development continued on the 140 mm (5.5 in) cannon, with Rheinmetall coordinating with the British Royal Ordnance and French GIAT companies. The 140 mm (5.5 in) cannon was fitted to an old Leopard 2 prototype with the turret T19. Counterweights were added to the rear of the turret to balance the increased weight of the 140 mm (5.5 in) cannon. The modified Leopard 2 was not equipped with any other KWS III upgrades apart from the new gun. Live fire testing showed mixed results, where the 140 mm (5.5 in) cannon showed superior penetrating power compared to the existing 120 mm (4.7 in) cannon, but demonstrated poorer handling characteristics. The lack of the autoloader on the prototype further hampered performance.

=== Leopard 2A6 ===
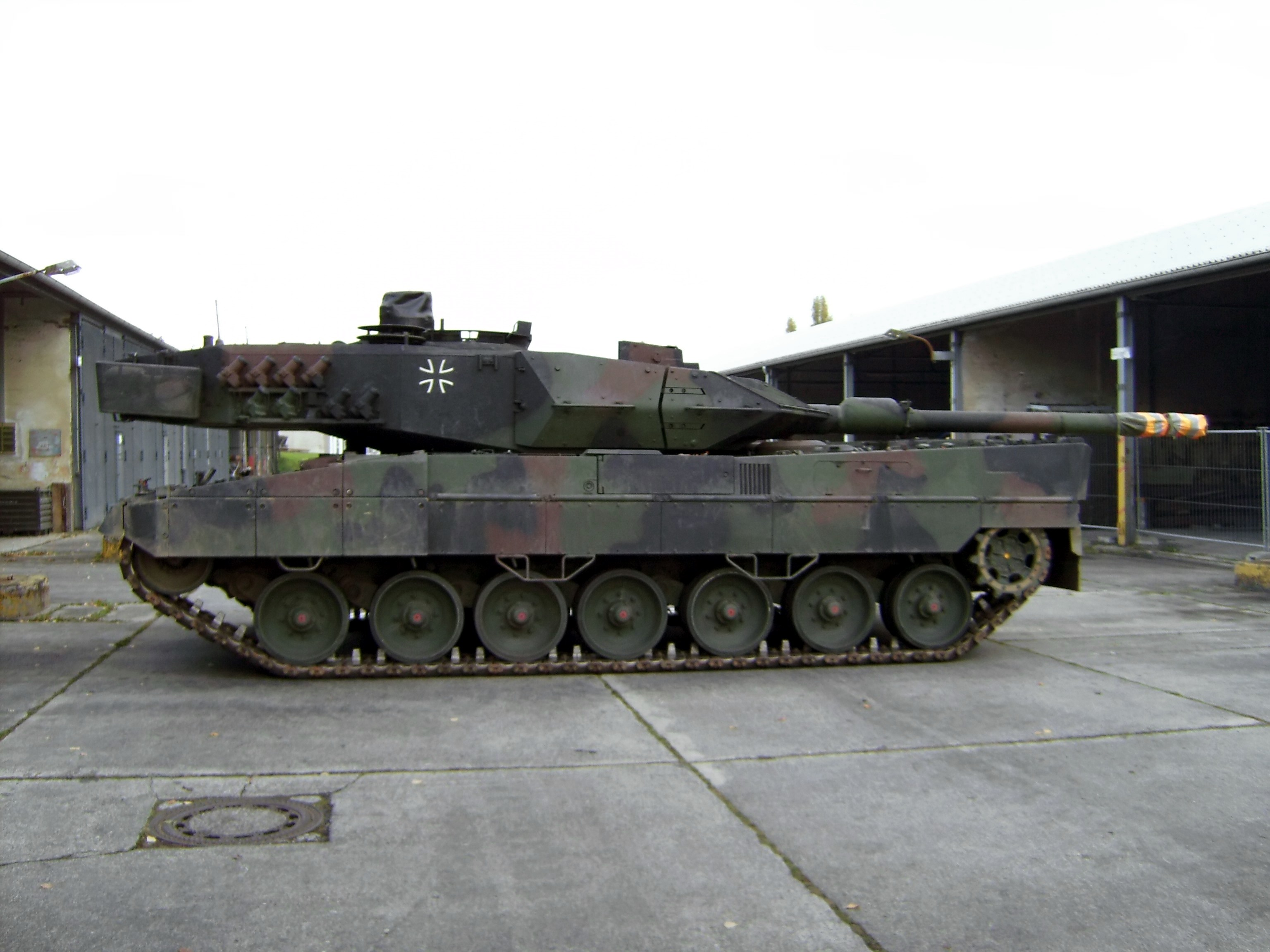
A German Leopard 2A6M with turret reversed

The Leopard 2A6 includes the addition of the Rheinmetall 120 mm (4.7 in) L/55 smoothbore gun and other changes. All German tank battalions of the "crisis intervention forces" are equipped with the A6. Canada purchased twenty Leopard 2A6s from the Netherlands. These were delivered in 2007. Portugal purchased 37 Leopard 2A6s from the Dutch in 2007, with delivery in 2008. In January 2014, Finland purchased 100 L2A6s, as well as munitions, simulators, and a ten-year supply of reserve parts from the Netherlands. The tanks were delivered in batches between 2015 and 2019.

The Leopard 2A6A1 is a command version of the Leopard 2A6, stemming from the KWS I programme. The vehicle includes additional radios (with the number depending on the level of command) to accommodate the communications for section, platoon, troop, company, squadron or battalion commanders. For section leaders, the vehicle is fitted with 1x SEM 80 and 1x SEM 90 VHF radios. For platoon or troop commanders, the vehicle is fitted with 1x SEM 80 and 1x SEM 90 VHF radios along with an 800m field telephone cable drum fitted at the rear of the vehicle. For company, squadron or battalion commanders the vehicle is fitted with 2x SEM 80 or 1x SEM 93 and 1x SEM 90 VHF radios along with an 800 m (2,600 ft) field telephone cable drum, for either fitted at the rear of the vehicle.

The Leopard 2A6M is a version of the 2A6 with enhanced mine protection under the chassis, and internal enhancements to improve crew survivability. In the summer of 2007, Canada borrowed 20 A6Ms from Germany for deployment to Afghanistan.

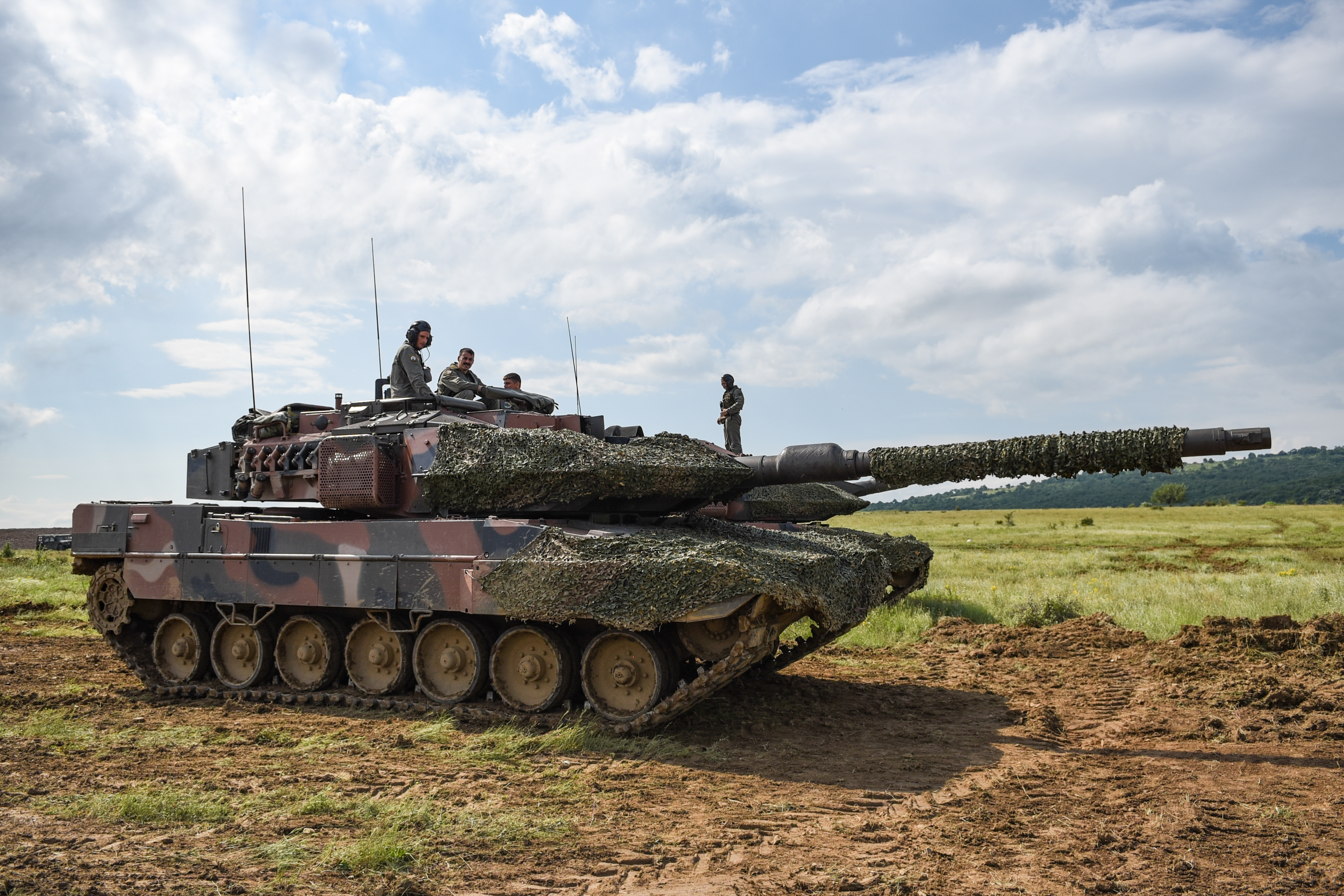
A Hellenic Army Leopard 2A6HEL

The Leopard 2 HEL ("Hellenic") is a derivative of the 2A6 export variant, "2A6EX" with additional customisation to meet the Greek needs. It has supplemental reinforcements on the upper glacis plate and crew hatches, as well as a full MEXAS package. Tactically and technically it is integrated with the NATO-interoperable INIOCHOS command and information system, as well as, a laser rangefinder and thermal imaging devices. It was ordered by the Greek Army in 2003 (in a package together with Leopard 1A5s) for 1.7 billion €, with 170 tanks delivered between 2006 and 2009. A total of 140 were built in Greece by ELBO, which delivered the first units in late 2006. They entered service with the Hellenic Army in 2008.

The Leopard 2A6M CAN is a Canadian variant of the Leopard 2A6M. Significant modifications include distinctive black boxes mounted on the rear of the turret bustle, and stand-off slat armour. The first tanks configured in this variant were 20 loaned from the German Bundeswehr in an effort to increase firepower and protection given to Canadian troops operating in the south of Afghanistan. The loaned tanks retain their German MG3 machine guns, the ex-Dutch tanks are also expected to retain their FN MAG machine guns due to commonality with Canadian stocks of C6 GPMG, itself a variant of the FN MAG.

Due to the loaned status of the first twenty tanks, the air conditioning unit originally could not be installed, as only minimal changes could be made. The crew wore cooling vests instead, and the turret's electric drive generates less heat than the hydraulic drive of the older Leopard C2. The loaned German tanks will be kept by the Canadian Forces and may be further upgraded, while ex-Dutch Leopard 2A6s were modified to German Leopard 2A6M specifications and used as restitution for the loaned tanks. Canadian Leopard 2s in Afghanistan were later fitted with air conditioning units, a much-needed commodity in the scorching desert of Afghanistan, and Saab's Barracuda camouflage mats, which reduce solar loading by 50 percent.

The Leopard 2A6TR was the Turkish variant during the Turkish Army tank procurement project in 2000. The version was based on 2A6EX. The project was dropped in favor of developing the indigenous Altay.

==== Leopardo 2E ====
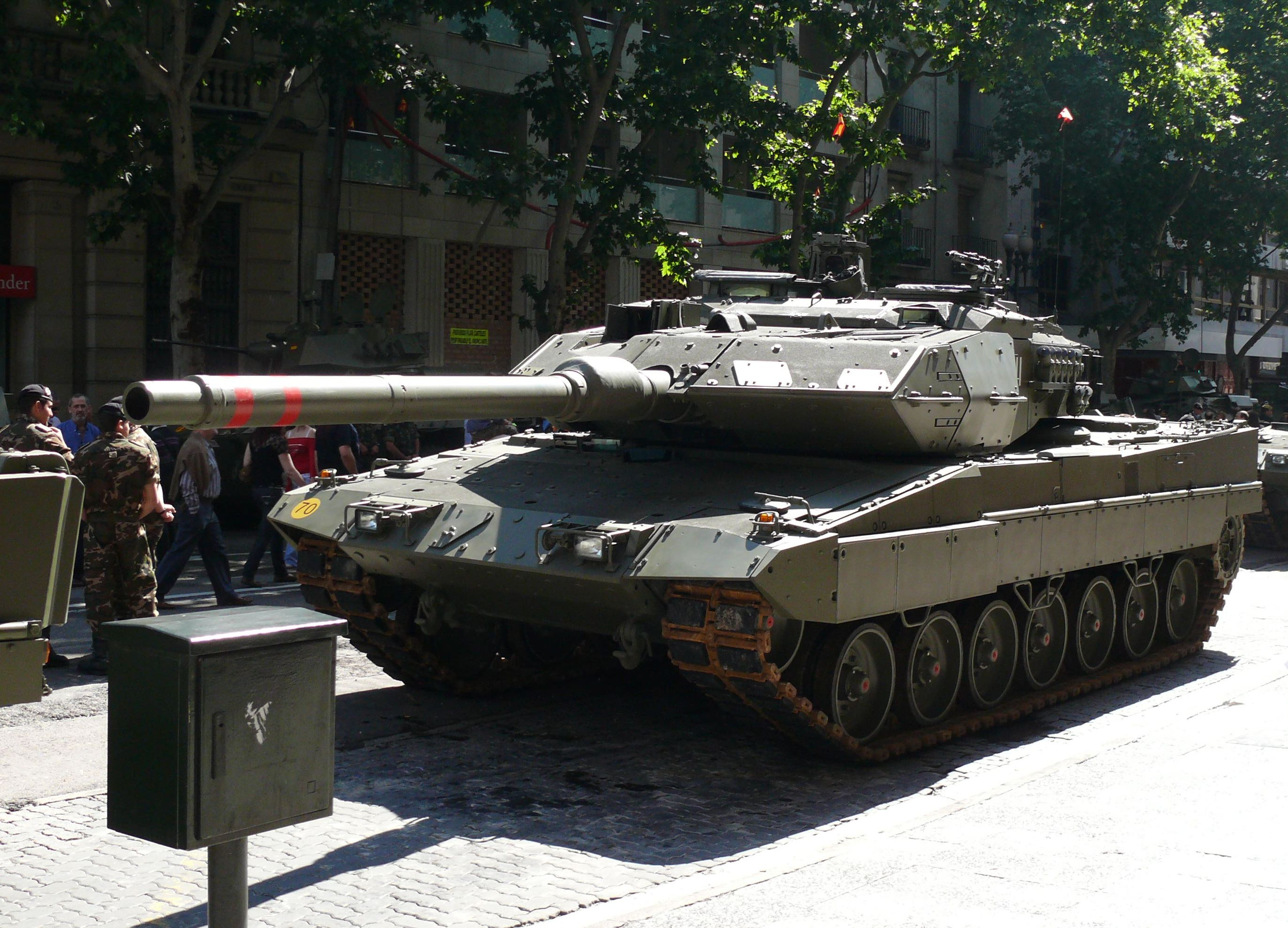
Spanish Leopard 2E

The Leopard 2E is a derivative of the 2A6, with greater armour protection, developed under a programme of co-production between the defence industries of Spain and Germany. The programme was developed within the frame of collaboration decided in 1995 between the Defence Ministries of both countries, which also included the cession of use by period of five years of 108 Leopard 2A4 from the German Army to the Spanish Army. The session was extended up to 2016, and after that those tanks will be the sole property of the Spanish Army, as has been made public in January 2006, then having been paid a total of €15,124,014 in ten yearly installments, giving the Spanish co-ownership from 2006.

In 1998, the Spanish government agreed to locally build 219 tanks of the Leopard 2E line, 16 recovery tanks of Leopard 2ER (Buffalo), and 4 training vehicles. They chose Santa Bárbara Sistemas as the main contractor. The programme, with a budget of €1,939.4 million, includes integrated logistical support, training courses for crew instructors and maintenance engineers, and driving, turret, maintenance, aiming, and shooting simulators. Deliveries of the first batch began in 2004.

=== Leopard 2PL ===
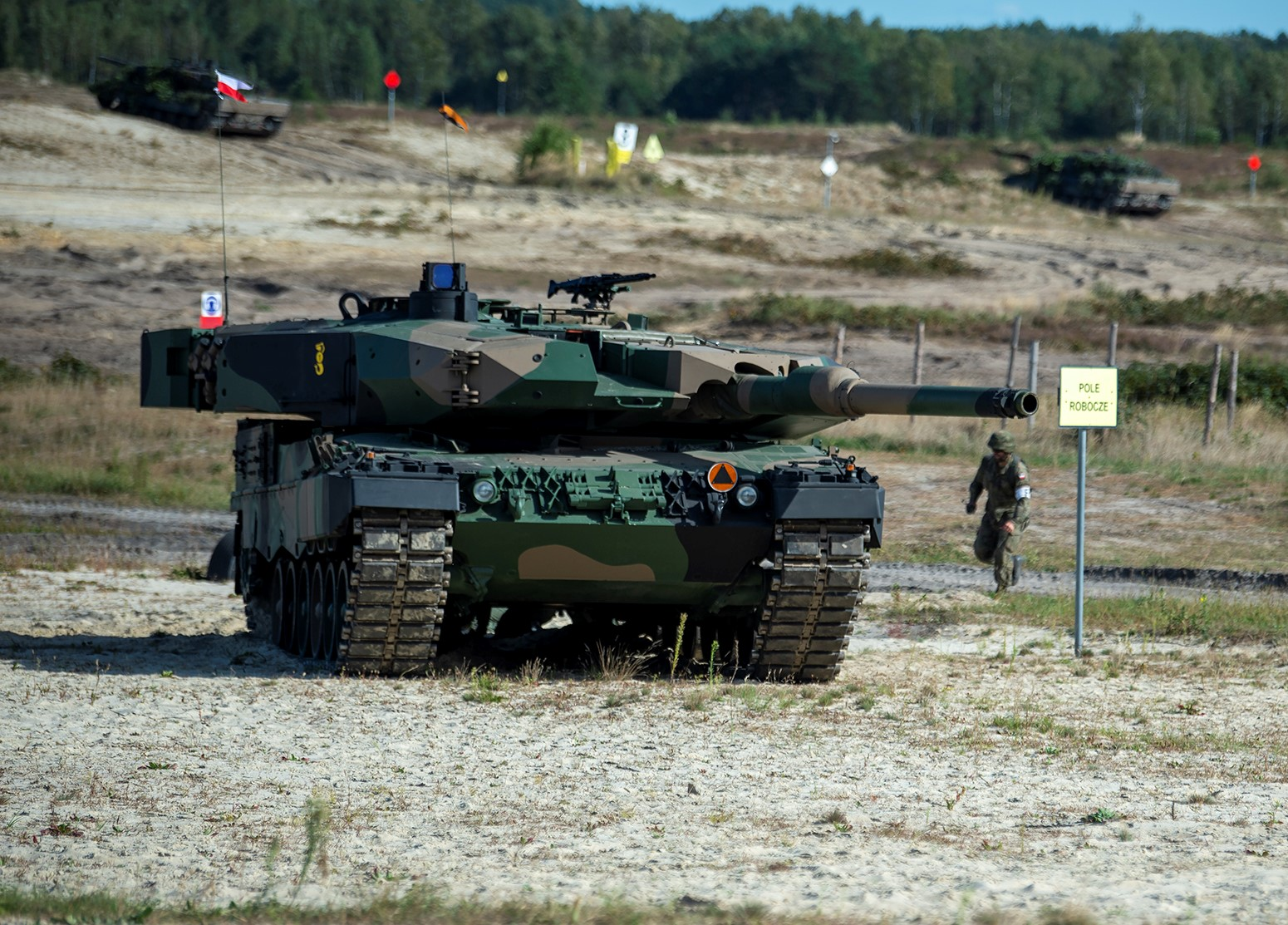
A Leopard 2PL

The Leopard 2PL is a Polish modernised version of the Leopard 2A4, carried out in cooperation with Rheinmetall and the Polish Armaments Group (Polish: Polska Grupa Zbrojeniowa, PGZ). The Leopard 2PL MBT is primarily tasked with assault, maintaining territory, and supporting mechanised and motorised subdivisions with its onboard weapon systems in all weather conditions during the day and night. The main upgrades when compared to the Leopard 2A4 include modernisation of the commander's and gunner's sight, additional ballistic modules on the turret, replacement of the hydraulic stabilisation system with a new electric system, and new fire extinguishing and fire suppression systems.

The upgrade included a new commander's control and monitoring system, the installation of an auxiliary power unit (APU), a new turret stowage compartment for crew equipment, the modernisation of its main gun to use new types of programmable ammunition, and the integration of day/night rear camera for drivers. Included are customised towing vehicles due to the increased weight of the upgraded tank. The upgraded 2PL version is in service with the Polish Land Forces. Of the Leopard 2A4s from the first (128) and the second (14) batches, 24 have been upgraded to Leopard 2PL standard. The rest will be upgraded to the 2PLM1 standard.

=== Leopard 2 PSO ===
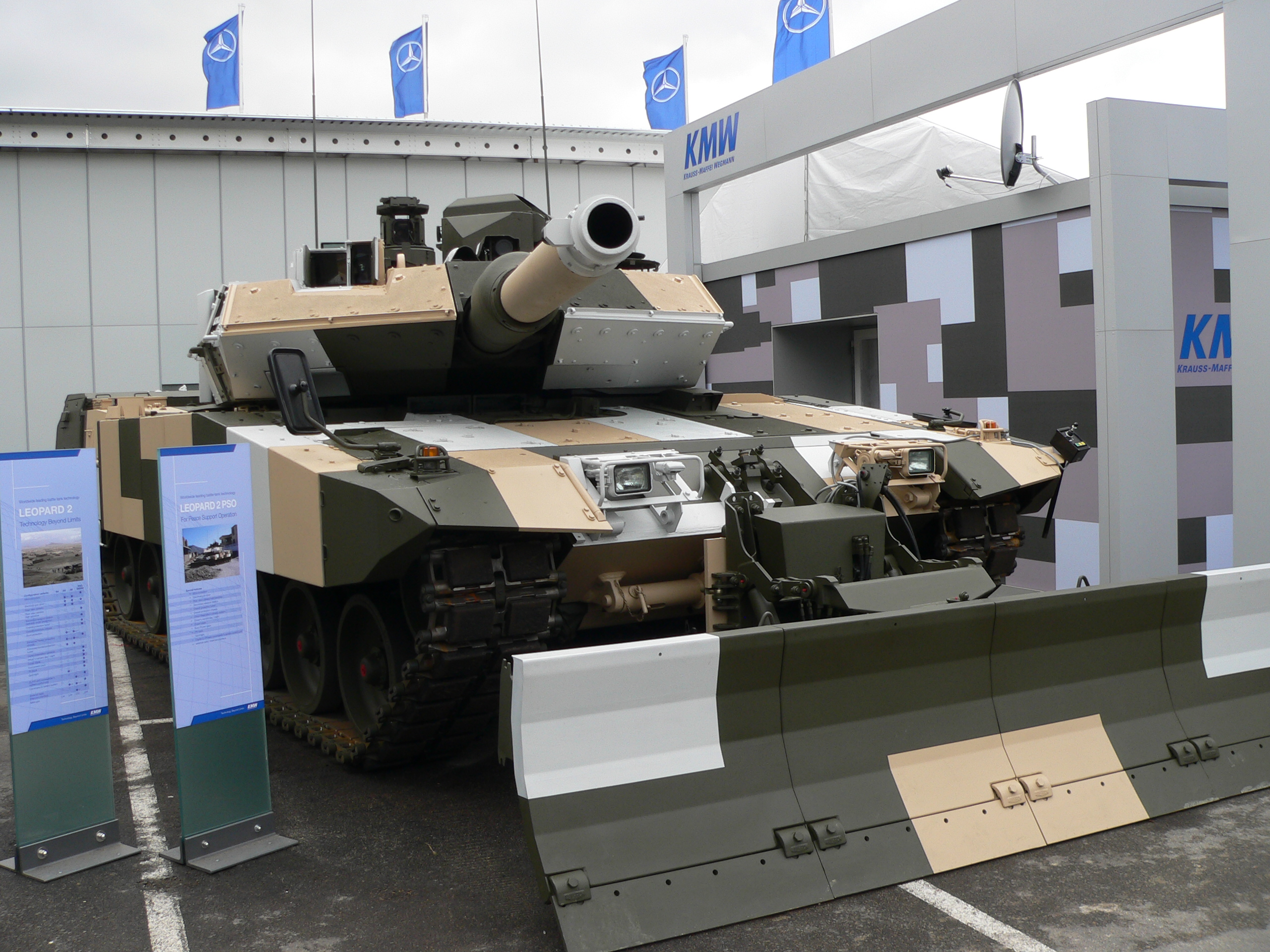
A Leopard 2 PSO at Eurosatory 2006

The new Leopard 2 PSO (Peace Support Operations) variant is designed especially for urban warfare, which had been encountered in peacekeeping operations with increasing frequency. The Leopard 2 PSO is equipped with more effective all-around protection, a secondary weapons station, improved reconnaissance ability, an obstacle clearance blade (OCB), a shorter gun barrel for manoeuvring on urban streets at the expense of fire range, non-lethal armament, close-range surveillance ability through camera systems, a searchlight and further changes to improve its perseverance and mobility in built-up non-wide open areas. These features are similar to the Tank Urban Survival Kit for the American M1A2 Abrams.

The vehicle was purely a tech demonstrator, which eventually lead to the development of the Leopard 2A7+.

=== Leopard 2A7 ===
The Leopard 2A7 vehicle is not intended to be optimised for combat in urban terrain, thus it is fundamentally different from the KMW variant, the: 2A7+ (see below). A total of 20 vehicles were provided for converting. It involves former Dutch A6NL models returned by Canada to Germany. The original upgrade to A6M has been extended in coordination with Canada and includes a crew-compartment cooling-system from the Leopard 2 A6M-HEL series, a new 20 kW (27 hp) auxiliary power unit based on the Steyr Motors M12 TCA UI engine, the Saab Barracuda Mobile Camouflage System (MCS) with Heat-Transfer Reduction (HTR CoolCam) system, a field trial proven combat management and information system (IFIS: Integriertes Führungs- und Informationssystem), onboard network optimisation with ultracapacitors in the chassis and turret, a SOTAS IP digital intercom system, a renewal of the fire suppression system in the crew compartment, and the retrofitting of Attica thermal imaging module in the commander optics.

The weapon system is adapted for firing HE ammunition. It is fitted for, but not with, additional passive side protection armour. The first Leopard 2A7 was handed over to the German Army in Munich in December 2014. 14 vehicles were produced for Tank Battalion 203, 4 went to the Armoured Corps Training Centre and one vehicle went to the Technical School for Land Systems and School for Technology of the Army. The last tank remains as a reference vehicle at KMW.

The Leopard 2A7V (The V stands for "verbessert" which is German for improved) is a variant of the Leopard 2A7 which is currently in-service the Bundeswehr. It features improved cameras for the commander and gunner. In addition, the rear view camera for the driver is added. The 120mm barrel has been hardened, allowing the ability to fire more modern extended-range ammunition, increasing effective range up to 5,000 metres. Another thing is the Battle Management System feature for digital electronics have been added, allowing better coordination with friendly forces. Next, the chassis have been additionally reinforced by an additional protection module at the front to counteract armour-piercing ammunition, to make up for the increase weight of the additional armour, it is equipped with an improved/more powerful drive system and drive train.

The Danish Armed Forces received its first Leopard 2A7 main battle tanks upgraded in Germany from the Leopard 2A5DK version at the Dragoon Barracks in Holstebro. The Danish Army will receive a total of 44 Leopard 2A7 vehicles by 2022.

Siemon T. Wezeman, senior researcher at SIPRI's arms transfers and military expenditure programme, stated that information from the UN Register of Conventional Arms 2016, indicated that some Leopard 2A7s were transferred to Singapore after 2014. SIPRI reported that the Singapore Army probably acquired a total of 45 Leopard 2A7s between 2016 and 2019, but the Singapore's Ministry of Defence denied having acquired the 2A7 version, presumably to minimise anxiety among her neighbours.

In February 2023, Norway ordered 54 Leopard 2A7 tanks to be delivered from 2026, with a further option for 18 vehicles if necessary. This order was later changed into a newly specified 2A8 NOR sub-variant of the 2A8.

=== Leopard 2A7+ ===
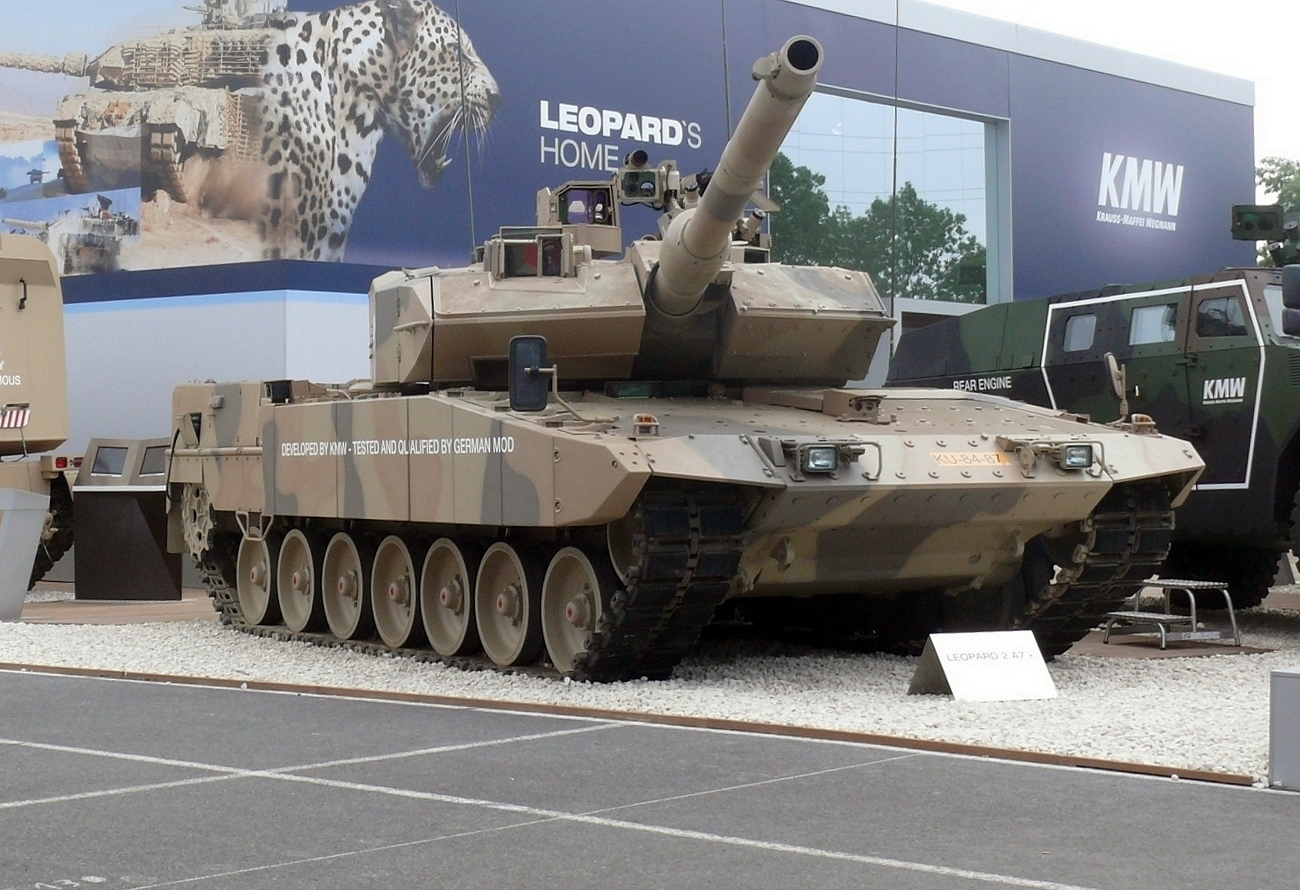
A Leopard 2A7+ at Eurosatory 2010

The Leopard 2A7+ was first shown to the public during the Eurosatory 2010, featuring the label "Developed by KMW – tested and qualified by the German Ministry of Defence". The Leopard 2A7+ has been tested by the Bundeswehr under the name UrbOp (urban operations).

The Leopard 2A7+ is designed to operate both in low-intensity and high-intensity conflicts. The tank's protection has been increased by modular armour. The frontal protection has been improved with a dual kit on the turret and hull front, while 360° protection against RPGs and mine protection increase the survivability of the tank in urban operations. The modular armour's system components were first used by Canada in Afghanistan. It can fire programmable High Explosive munitions. The turret-mounted MG3 has been replaced with a stabilised FLW 200 remotely controlled weapon station. Mobility, sustainability, and situational awareness have also been improved.

In December 2018, Hungary ordered forty-four 2A7+s (sub-variant 2A7HU), making them the second operator of the improved version, after Qatar.

=== Leopard 2A8 ===
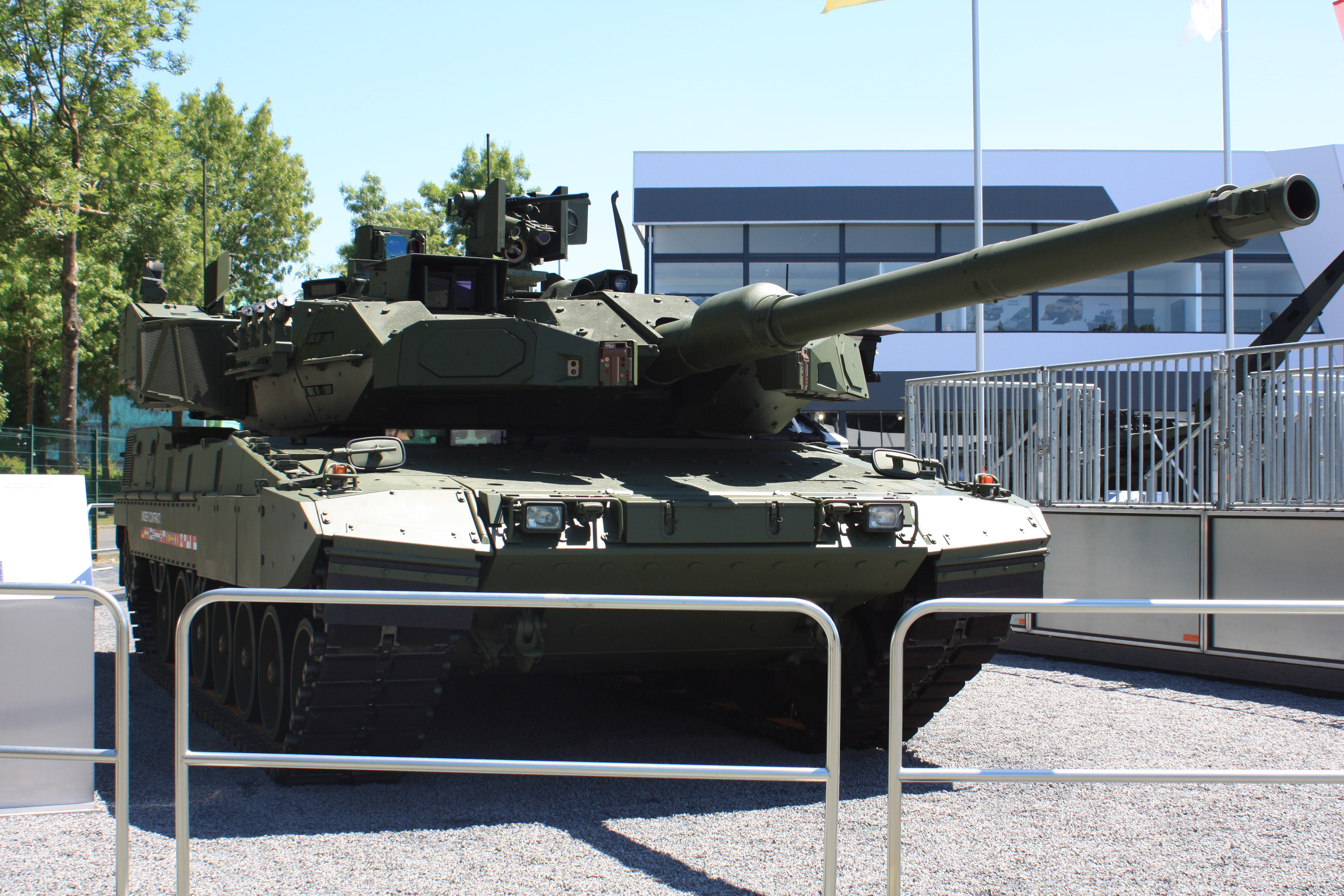
A Leopard 2A8 demonstrator at Eurosatory 2022

The Leopard 2A8 will be based on the current Leopard 2A7HU production model but feature additional improvements; among them the integration of the Trophy active protection system and an all-round situational awareness system with sensor-fusion capability.

==== Orders ====
To replace the eighteen Leopard 2A6 tanks handed over to the Armed Forces of Ukraine, the German Ministry of Defence begun planning a purchase a batch of eighteen Leopard 2A8 tanks (with the option for a further 105) in May 2023. In July 2024, Germany's budget committee approved a purchase of the remaining 105 tanks, in a contract worth 2.93 bln €. Deliveries are planned between 2027 and 2030 and some ordered tanks will be used by the 45th Panzer Brigade, which, at the time of purchase, was deployed in Lithuania.

The Czech Ministry of Defence started negotiations for the purchase of 70–77 Leopard 2A8 in May 2023, including domestic manufacturing rights for aspects of the tank production. Czech government approved the purchase in June 2024, with the final order being for 77 tanks delivered by 2030, for an estimated 52 billion Czech crowns.

In July 2023 Lithuanian MoD announced that the Leopard 2A8 proved to be the only tank to meet the requirements set by the ministry, leading to the rejection of bids of the M1 Abrams and K2 Black Panther tanks. In January 2024 Lithuanian State Defence Council agreed to purchase the tanks and associated support vehicles to equip a Tank Battalion, but the final cost and the number of vehicles remained a subject of negotiations. In December 2024 Lithuania signed a confirmation of 44 Leopard 2A8 tanks acquisition contract.

On 12 July 2023 Italian government confirmed during a Parliament audition that Italy intends to purchase up to 250 Leopard 2A8 tanks from 2023 to 2025. Procurement was completed on 21 February 2024, resulting in the final order of 132 Leopard 2A8 tanks and 130 other vehicles for a total of 8.5 billion € with the deliveries scheduled to be completed by 2037.

In August 2023 Dutch MoD begun planning a procurement of up to 52 Leopard 2A8 tanks in addition to their eighteen leased Leopard 2A6 tanks. This planned acquisition is part of the nation's effort to rebuild their army after severe budget cuts of the 21st century. In February 2024 it came out that the Dutch budget for 2024 did not allocate any funding for the purchase. In early September 2024 the new government announced that an undefined number of Leopard 2A8 tanks would be ordered. This is now possible because of the new government allocated additional funding exceeding 2% of their GDP.

In December 2024, Lithuania signed a contract to acquire 44 Leopard 2A8 tanks from KNDS Germany for €950 million. This deal provides Lithuania's newly established tank brigade—its first since regaining independence in 1991. The procurement was finalised alongside an agreement to station a German Army brigade within Lithuanian territory by 2027, aligning logistics and maintenance efforts with NATO standards in the Baltic region. The procured main battle tanks are confirmed to feature Trophy APS and next-generation digitalised systems.

In January 2025 it was announced that Sweden had signed a deal with KNDS Deutschland worth $1.97 billion for the purchase of 44 Leopard 2A8s and the upgrading of 66 Strv 122s with deliveries lasting since 2028 till 2031.

==== Leopard 2A8 NOR ====
The Norwegian armed forces' order of fifty-four Leopard 2A7NOs was changed into a new 2A8 NOR variant by the middle of June 2023. A variety of Norwegian changes and alterations necessitated the renaming of the original 2A7NO into a unique new 2A8 NOR variant. This sub-variant mainly differs from the German 2A8 by integrating a Norwegian-designed C4IS-solution that includes Kongsberg's ICS/CORTEX-solution and Teleplan Globe's FACNAV and NorBMS battlefield management systems.

=== Leopard 2 A-RC 3.0 ===
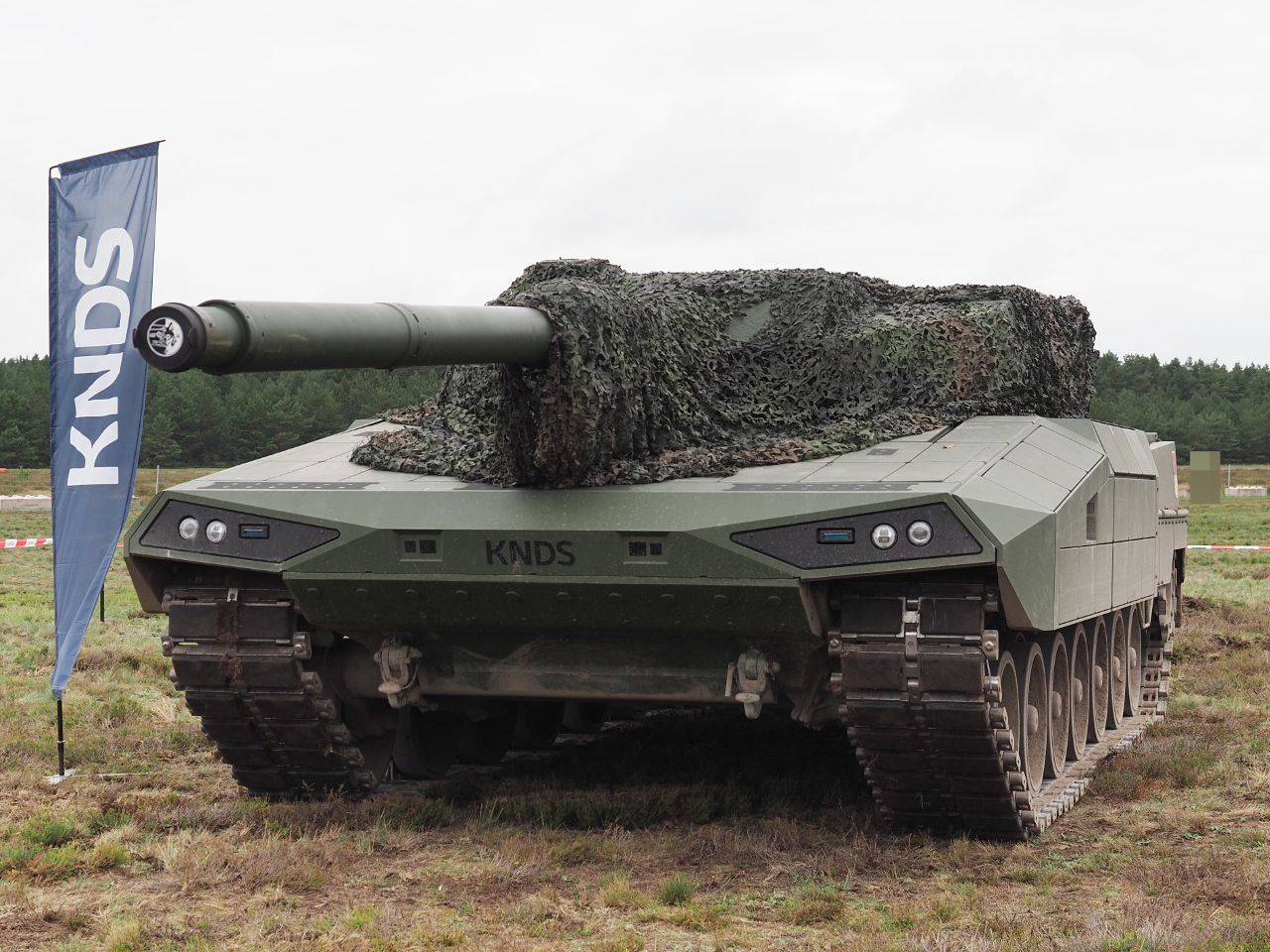
Leopard 2A-RC 3.0 prototpe on static display at the Klietz training area

Variant presented in June 2024 at the Eurosatory exhibition. It is equipped with an unmanned turret armed with a 120 mm (4.7 in) smoothbore gun fed by a modular linear autoloader, the 120 mm (4.7 in) gun can be exchanged for a 130 mm (5.1 in) or 140 mm (5.5 in) gun, the auto loader is capable of loading 3 rounds in 10 seconds. Its secondary armament consists of a RWCS armed with a 30x113mm cannon capable of countering drone threats and an anti-tank missile. The weapon suite can be configured for 3D line-of-sight (LOS) and non-line-of-sight (NLOS) engagement. For its protection, it has a proven active protection system and smoke grenade launcher. It weighs less than 60 t (59 long tons; 66 short tons), measures 7.95 m (26.1 ft), extending to 11.17 m (36.6 ft) with the barrel, 3.77 m (12.4 ft) wide and 2.44 m (8 ft 0 in) high to the roof of the turret. Its engine generates 1,500 hp (1,100 kW), allowing the tank to move at a speed of 65 km/h (40 mph) and its autonomy is 460 km (290 mi). It has a crew of 3, commander, driver and gunner, all located inside the chassis.

=== Engineering and driver training derivatives ===
==== Bergepanzer BPz3 Büffel ====
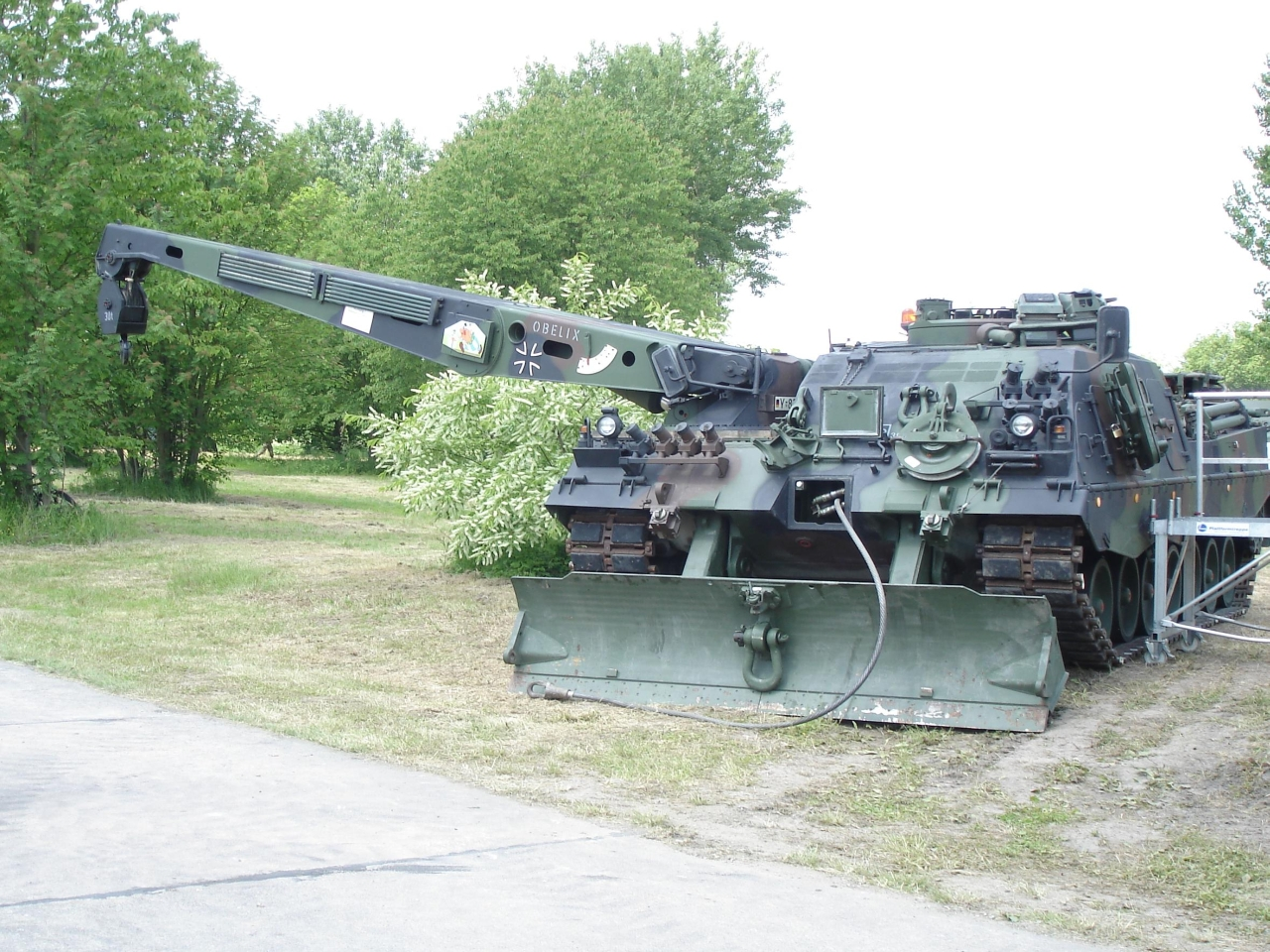
A BPz3 "Büffel", German Army

The BPz3 armoured recovery vehicle includes both a bulldozer and a crane with integral winch, allowing it to approach damaged vehicles, even over rough and fought-over terrain, and tow them to safety. It is equipped with a machine gun for local self-defence, a smoke grenade launcher, and NBC protection. Like the tank, it is powered by a 1,500 PS (1,500 hp; 1,100 kW) diesel engine. It is in service with Germany (where it is also designated Büffel or Bergepanzer 3 for Salvage Tank 3), the Netherlands with 25 vehicles (who co-developed it with Germany and calls it Buffel), Canada, Greece, Singapore (where it is called L2-ARV locally), Spain (where it is called Leopard 2ER Búfalo), Sweden (in modified form as the Bärgningsbandvagn 120; Bgbv 120) and Switzerland (BPz3).

==== WiSENT 2 ====
A multi-purpose, Leopard 2–based Armoured Support Vehicle developed by Flensburger Fahrzeugbau. The vehicle's modular design allows it to be converted quickly from an Armoured Recovery Vehicle (ARV) to an Armoured Engineer Vehicle (AEV) in less than five hours.

==== AEV 3 Kodiak ====
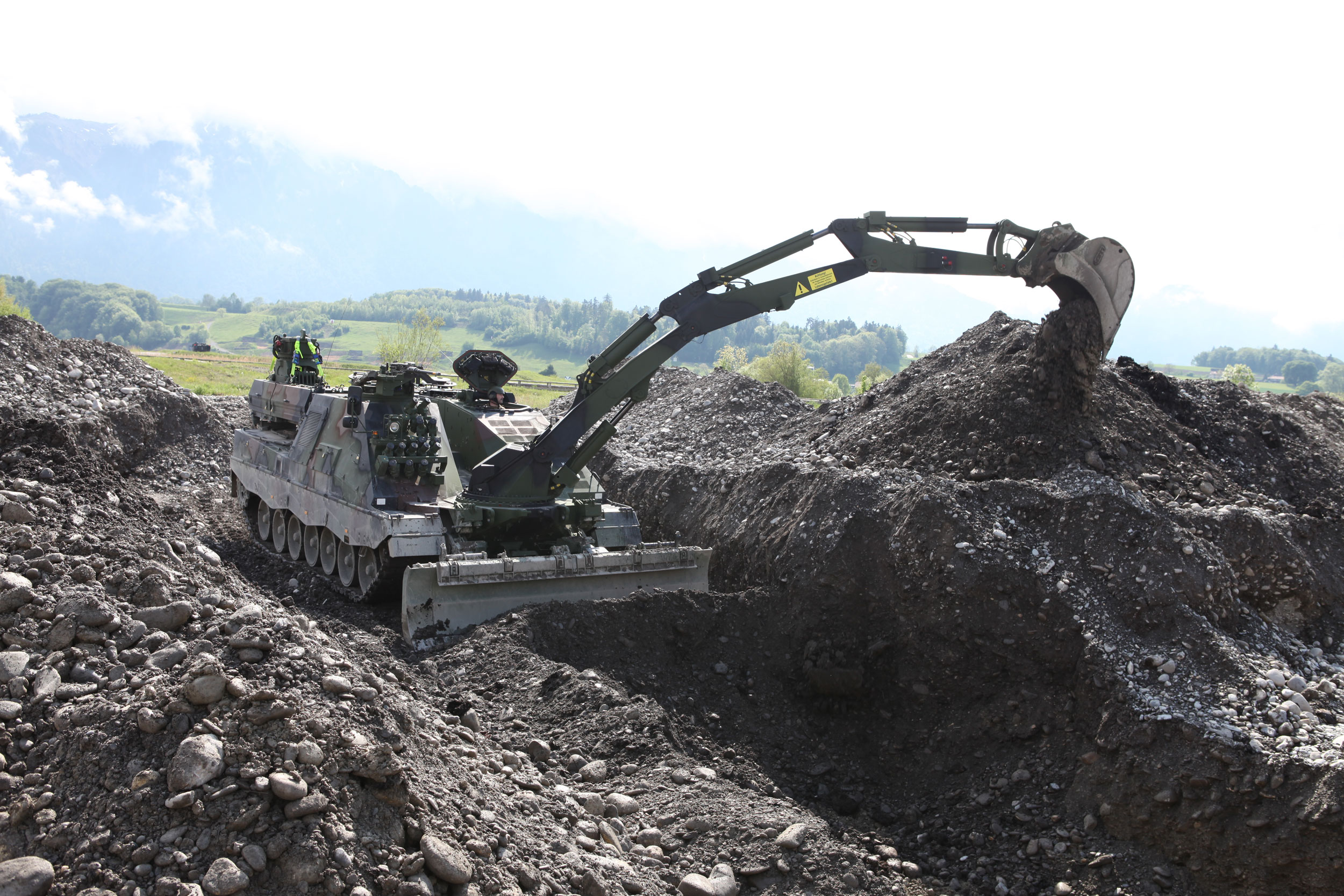
The AEV 3 Kodiak has an articulated excavator arm and bulldozer blade among its adaptations for obstruction removal.

The AEV 3 Kodiak is a combat engineering vehicle conversion of the Leopard 2 used by Germany, the Netherlands, Singapore, Sweden, and Switzerland. It is equipped with a bulldozer blade, excavator arm, and dual capstan winches. In lieu of a turret, a Remote Weapon Station or other armaments can be fitted. It is built on the Leopard 2 chassis with a built-up forward superstructure. The vehicle is used primarily for the clearance of obstacles, including minefields. The Dutch version has additional bomblet protection for the crew compartments. Spain may procure 24 examples for the Spanish Army from converted Leopard 2A4 hulls (one vehicle has been trialled in Spain) and the type will be offered to Germany.

==== Panzerschnellbrücke 2 ====
This vehicle, created by MAN Mobile Bridges GmbH, is an armoured vehicle-launched bridge developed from the Leopard 2 tank chassis. It is designed to carry a folding mobile bridge, which it can "launch" across a river. Once emplaced, the bridge is sturdy enough to support most vehicles, even other Leopard tanks. When the crossing is complete, the bridge layer simply hooks up to the bridge and re-stows it.

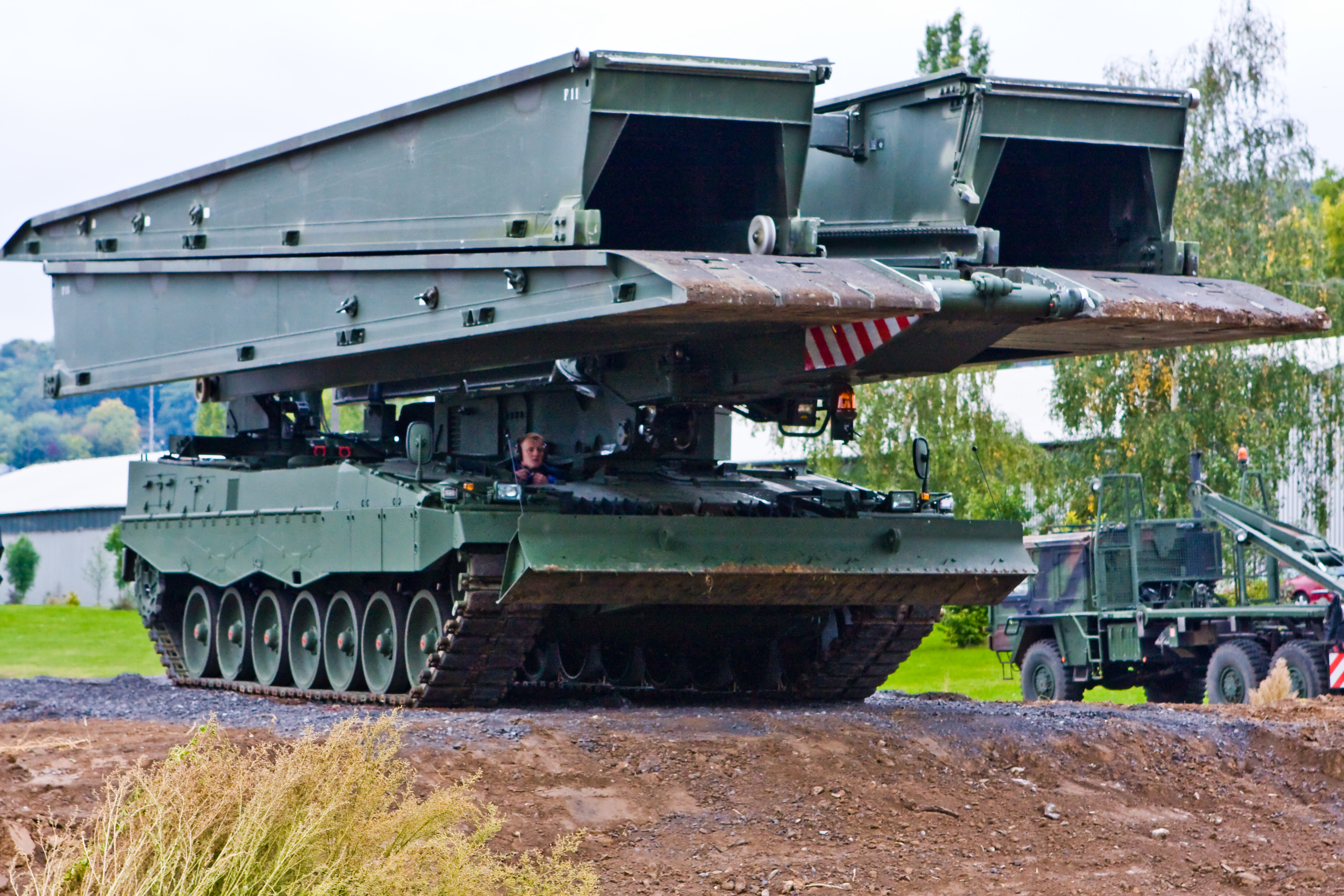
A Panzerschnellbrücke Leguan folding mobile bridge on a Leopard 2 chassis, demonstrated by the German Army

==== Panzerschnellbrücke Leguan ====
This modular system combines a bridge module created by MAN Mobile Bridges GmbH with a tank chassis. The Bundeswehr is testing the Leguan bridgelayer on a Leopard 2 chassis.

==== Driver Training Tank ====
The Leopard 2 Driver Training Tank, as the name implies, is a non-combatant Leopard 2 for instructing soldiers in the finer points of handling the tank. The turret is supplanted by a weighted and fixed observation cab with forward and side-facing windows and a dummy gun. The instructor rides in this cab, with override controls for critical systems, and space is provided for two other students to observe.

==== Leopard 2R ====
A heavy breaching and de-mining vehicle developed by Patria for the Finnish Army, based on the Leopard 2A4. Six vehicles were converted. The vehicles are equipped with a mine plough or a dozer blade, and an automated marking system. All were donated to Ukraine in 2023.

==== Leopard 2L ====
An armoured vehicle-launched bridge developed by KMW and Patria for the Finnish Army. Ten Finnish 2A4 tanks were rebuilt to carry the LEGUAN bridge.

== Technical data ==
Technical data
Parameters	Leopard 2A4	Leopard 2A5	Leopard 2A6/A6M
Crew	4		
Engine	MTU MB 873 Ka-501 12-cylinder twin-turbocharged diesel engine		
Displacement	Bore × stroke: 170 × 175 mm, 47,666 cm^{3} (2,908.8 cu in) displacement		
Power output	1,500 PS (1,479 hp; 1,103 kW), rpm: 2,600/min		
Torque output	4,700 N⋅m (3,467 lbf⋅ft), rpm: 1,600–1,700/min		
Transmission	Hydro-mechanical control, reversing and steering gear HSWL 354 with combined hydrodynamic-mechanical service brake, 4 forward, 2 reverse		
Suspension system	Torsion bar spring mounted support roller drive with hydraulic dampers		
Length; Turret forward	9.67 m (31.7 ft)		10.97 m (36.0 ft)
Width	3.7 m (12 ft)	3.76 m (12.3 ft)	
Height	2.79 m (9 ft 2 in)	3.03 m (9.9 ft)	
Ground clearance	0.54 m (1 ft 9 in)		
Wading depth without preparation	1.2 m (3 ft 11 in)		
Wading depth with snorkel	4 m (13 ft)		
Trench passability	3 m (9.8 ft)		
Climbing ability	1.1 m (3 ft 7 in)		
Empty weight	52 t (51 long tons; 57 short tons)	57.3 t (56.4 long tons; 63.2 short tons)	A6: 57.6 t (56.7 long tons; 63.5 short tons) A6M: 60.2 t (59.2 long tons; 66.4 short tons)
Combat weight	55.15 t (54.28 long tons; 60.79 short tons)	59.5 t (58.6 long tons; 65.6 short tons)	A6: 59.9 to 51.7 t (59.0 to 50.9 long tons; 66.0 to 57.0 short tons) A6M: 62.5 t (61.5 long tons; 68.9 short tons)
Maximum speed	68 km/h (42 mph) frontwards 31 km/h (19 mph) backwards		
Fuel capacity	1,160 L (260 imp gal; 310 US gal) (limited to 900 L (200 imp gal; 240 US gal) in training)		
Operating range	Road: ca. 340 km (210 mi); Terrain: ca. 220 km (140 mi); Average: ca. 280 km (170 mi); Static test: 72–93 hours (with 900–1,160 L (200–260 imp gal; 240–310 US gal) capacity)		
Fuel consumption	Road: ca. 340 L/100 km; Terrain: ca. 530 L/100 km; Average: ca. 410 L/100 km; Static test: 12.5 L/h (with 900–1,160 L (200–260 imp gal; 240–310 US gal) capacity)		
Tank rotation time (360°)	10 seconds		
Armament	Rheinmetall 120 mm smoothbore gun L/44; 1 coaxial machine gun 1 pintle mounted machine gun		Rheinmetall 120 mm smoothbore gun L/55; 1 coaxial machine gun 1 pintle mounted machine gun or RCWS
Turret weight	16 t (16 long tons; 18 short tons)	21 t (21 long tons; 23 short tons)	
Turret rotation time (360°):	10 seconds (hydraulic)	9 seconds (electric)	

== Operators ==
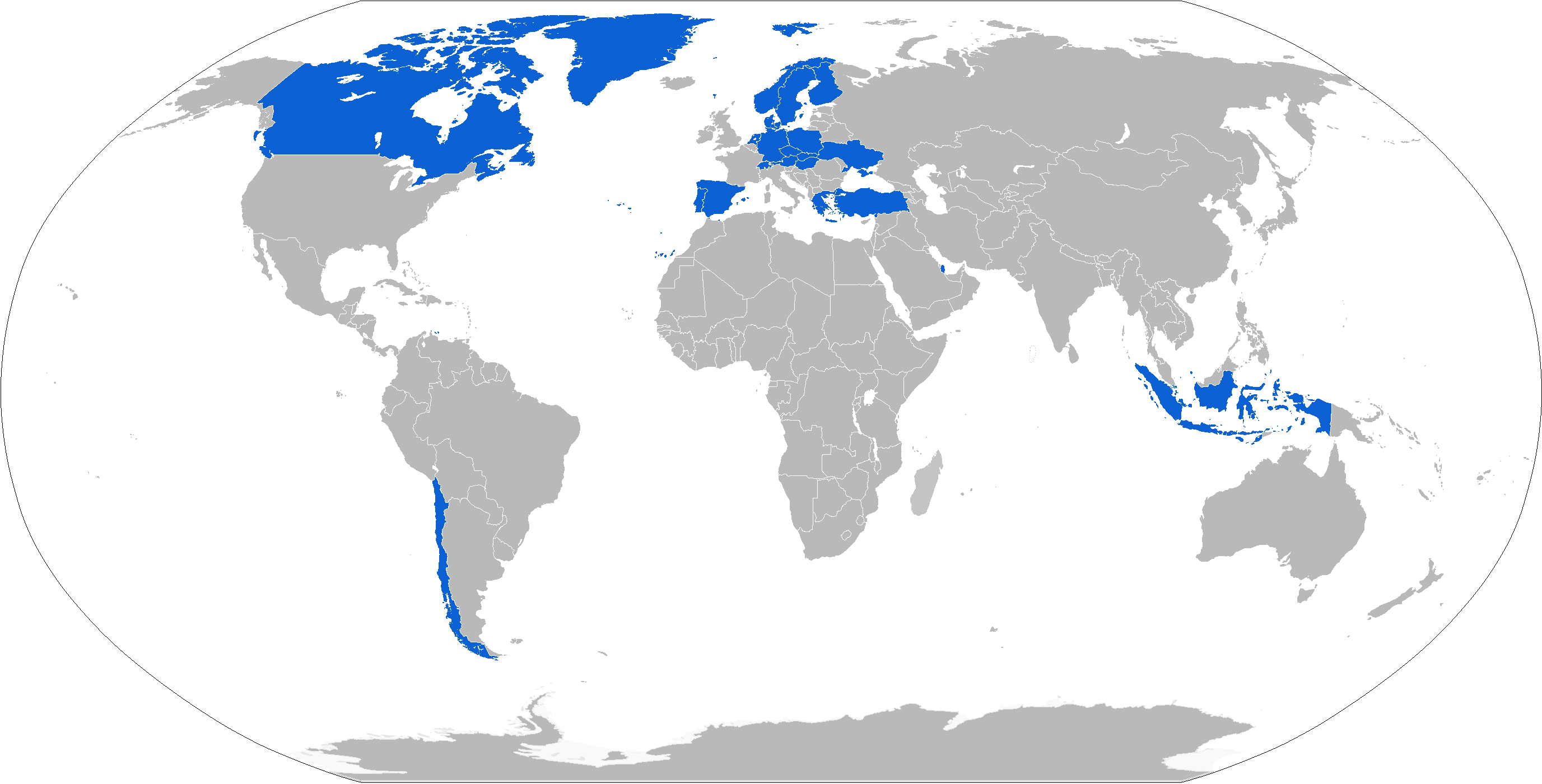
Leopard 2 operators as of February 2023

=== Current operators ===
Country	Variant	Quantity (estimated)	Origin	Notes
Austria	2A4	56	West Germany	The Austrian Army initially acquired 114 Leopard 2A4s from surplus Dutch stocks plus one turret in 1996. In 2006 the number of tanks was reduced to two tank battalions, with 40 of the Leopard 2A4s sold back to KMW in 2011 (Canada lost the bid to purchase them). In 2017–19, a third tank battalion was added and the number of active duty tanks was increased to 56. In 2021 it was announced that Austria would modernize its tank fleet to the 2A7 standard. As of February 2025 it is considering to purchase 58 Leopard 2A8s.
Canada	2A4 CAN	34 (used for training)	West Germany	Acquired 100 Leopard 2A4 from the Netherlands in 2009. An additional 15 Leopard 2A4 tanks were purchased from the German Army for spare parts. 20 modified into 2A4M CAN and 18 converted into AEVs, leaving 42 remaining in active service by 2022 primarily for training. 8 delivered to Ukraine by April 2023. It was reported in January 2023 that the majority of Canadian Leopard 2 tanks were in a state of disrepair, with as few as 15 gun tanks, or only 20%, operational and ready for use.
Canada	2A4M CAN	20	West Germany	2A4s with modular armour adapted from the Leopard 2A7+ variant and sections of slat armour as well as enhanced electronics and an all digital turret. It was also planned that the main gun would be upgraded to the L55, variant, but the L44 gun was found to be favourable for the conditions found in Afghanistan at the time, so was retained.
Canada	2A6M CAN	20	Germany	Initially leased from the German Army beginning in mid-2007 to support the Canadian deployment in Afghanistan. First tank received on 2 August 2007, and arriving in Afghanistan on 16 August 2007. The 2A6Ms were permanently acquired by Canada in exchange for 20 of the 2A4s purchased from the Netherlands which were upgraded to 2A7 standard given to Germany as payment.
Canada	BPz3 Büffel	11	Germany; Switzerland	2 Bergepanzer 3 Büffel purchased from Bundeswehr for use in Afghanistan. 12 surplus Swiss Pz 87 were later purchased in 2011 for conversion to ARVs. Canada announced it would provide one of its 12 ARV's to Ukraine.
Canada	WiSENT 2 AEV (RAM)	18	Germany; Canada	FFG Canada received the contract in 2014 to convert 18 of Canada's Dutch Leopard 2A4s into Wisent 2 AEVs. Vehicles were converted domestically in New Brunswick and all 18 were delivered by 2018.
Chile	2A4CHL	140	West Germany; Germany	Acquired in 2007, upgraded to the Leopard 2A4CHL standard (plus eight to be used as spares).
Croatia	2A4	10	Germany	Contract under lease for training since 2025.
Croatia	2A8	0 (44 ordered)	Germany	Contract signed in December 2025 for the Leopard 2A8.
Czech Republic	2A4	42	West Germany; Switzerland	In July 2016, officers of the Army of the Czech Republic visited a Spanish military base at Zaragoza where Spanish Leopards 2A4 are stored. The Czech Republic was interested in replacing their domestically produced T-72M4CZ and aging T-72M/T-72M1. No official agreement was signed. Later, the Czech Army unofficially announced that the Spanish Leopards were in too poor a condition to be purchased. In May 2022 the Czech Ministry of Defence announced it will get 15 Leopards 2A4 from Germany as an exchange for Czech tanks that have been given to Ukraine to help defend against Russian invasion and may purchase up to 50 modern 2A7+ variants later. It was later clarified that Czechia would receive 14 Leopard 2A4 and 1 Bpz3 ARV. The first Leopard 2A4 was delivered on 21 December 2022, and all 14 were delivered as of 21 November 2023. In February 2024, the Czech Ministry of Defence announced it received an offer from Germany for additional 14 Leopards 2A4 and one Büffel ARM as a compensation for weapons transfers to Ukraine. The Czech government accepted the offer later in February 2024. This offer of free tanks was accompanied by an offer to purchase the same number of Leopard 2A4 platform vehicles (14 MBTs + 1 ARV) for "lower hundreds of millions EUR". The contract was signed in December 2024. If these two offers are accepted, the Czech Army would own 42 Leopard 2A4 MBTs and 3 Büffel ARVs as a complement to planned purchase of Leopard 2A8 variant.
Czech Republic	BPz3 Büffel	2	Germany	Part of "Ringtausch" package, to be delivered in 2024.
Czech Republic	2A8	0 (42 on order + option for 14)	Germany; Czech Republic	Contract for their purchase signed in September 2025, with an option for 14 tanks. Delivery planned to start in 2028.
Czech Republic	Support roles (undefined yet)	19	Germany; Czech Republic	Contract for their purchase signed in September 2025, with an option for 14 tanks. Delivery planned to start in 2028.
Denmark	2A7 DK	44	Germany	The Royal Danish Army received its first Leopard 2 tanks from surplus German stocks in 1998. These were upgraded from 2A4 standard to 2A5DK (equal to Leopard 2A6 minus the L/55 gun) in 2004–2006, at which point the army operated 57 Leopards. In 2023, they had 44, which all were upgraded to A7 standard with Danish modifications between 2019 and 2023. On 20 April 2024, an internal document from the Danish Ministry of Defence surfaced in the media. This document outlined acquisition strategies, notably including plans to procure an additional 9 Leopard 2 MBT's.
Denmark	Leguan AVLB	7	Germany	7 Leopard 2A5DK converted to bridge layers.
Denmark	WiSENT 2 ARV	10	Germany	Based on Leopard 2, delivered from 2025
Denmark	WiSENT 2 MC/AEV	6	Germany	Based on Leopard 2, delivered from 2025
Finland	2A4	100 (+10 for spare parts)	West Germany	The Finnish Army originally bought 124 2A4s from surplus German stocks in 2003. In 2009, the Finnish Army bought 15 more German surplus Leopard 2A4s for spare parts of existing fleet, bringing the total number of Finnish Leopard 2A4 tanks to 139. Of the 39 spares, 10 were converted into bridge-layers, 12 converted into breaching tanks, 7 used for the chassis of the Marksman SPAAG, the remaining 10 disassembled for use as spares, leaving 100 operational tanks. In 2015, most of the Leopard 2A4s were moved into reserve, where they remain as of 2023.
Finland	2A6	100	Germany	In January 2014, Finland agreed with the Netherlands to purchase 100 used Leopard 2A6NL tanks for approximately €200 million. All are in active service as of 2023.
Finland	Marksman	7	West Germany; Finland; United Kingdom	Seven Leopard 2A4 chassis were used to replace the T-55AM chassis in 2015 for the Marksman SPAAG.
Finland	Leguan AVLB (Siltapanssarivaunu Leopard 2L)	10 (+ 6 ordered)	Germany; Finland	10 of the 24 spare Leopard 2A4s were domestically converted into bridge layers; 6 in 2008, 4 more by 2021. See 2A4 and 2A6 notes. Six new Leopard 2L bridge-layers were ordered from KMW in 2023.
Finland	2A4 MCRS	6	West Germany; Germany; Finland	Six of the 24 spare Leopard 2A4s were converted into Mine Clearing Roller Systems (MCRS) equipped with Israeli-made Urdan mine rollers.
Germany (industry)	2A4	N/A	West Germany	Retired from service. Remaining Leopard 2A4s have been converted to support vehicles, are in long-term storage, or with KMW and Rheinmetall for resale. Rheinmetall had approximately 51 available in 2023; 14 were donated to Czechia and 15 to Slovakia as part of Germany's Ringtausch program. 14 purchased for Ukraine by Denmark and the Netherlands. Germany replenished its stocks with 25 Swiss Panzer 87s (2A4s) in 2023, though all of these were offered to Czechia as part of a major arms deal.
Germany (military)	2A5	19	Germany	The German army had up to 285 Leopard 2A5: Lot 1: + 225 upgraded from standard Leopard 2A4; Lot 2: + 60 125 were planned to be upgraded from standard Leopard 2A4, but due to further upgrades, only 60 were upgraded to the standard Leopard 2A5, the remaining 65 were upgraded directly from the Leopard 2A4 to the standard Leopard 2A6; Following that some were sold and upgraded: - 160 upgraded to the standard Leopard 2A6; - 105 sold to Poland in 2013 after Germany decided to limit its fleet to 225 tanks
Germany (military)	2A6	68	Germany	225 Leopard 2 were upgraded to A6 standard: + 160 modified from Leopard 2A5; + 65 upgraded from the Leopard 2A4; The German Army also purchased: + 18 coming from the Netherlands Army in 2015; Some of those were upgraded / transferred: - 70 upgraded to standard Leopard 2A6M; - 51 upgraded to standard Leopard 2A6 A3; - 20 upgraded to the standard Leopard 2A7, which were again upgraded to standard Leopard 2A7V; - 16 upgraded to the standard Leopard 2A7V directly; - 18 transferred to Ukraine in 2023 (14 + 4)
Germany (military)	2A6 A3	34	Germany	Leopard 2A6 upgraded with new Peri R17A3 commander optronics.: + 51 in service as of 2019; - 17 removed from service in 2022 to be modified in Leopard 2A7 A1 (see in future equipment section)
Germany (military)	2A6M	20	Germany	Leopard 2A6 with better anti-mine protection.: + 70 were modified from Leopard 2A6; - 50 later upgraded to standard Leopard 2A6 MA3
Germany (military)	2A6M A3	50	Germany	Leopard 2A6M upgraded with new Peri R17A3 commander optronics.: 50 modified from standard Leopard 2A6M
Germany (military)	2A7V	104	Germany	All delivered as of November 2023, made of: 68 Leopard 2A4 from the industry; 16 Leopard 2A6; 20 Leopard 2A7 (the only that were at this standard, coming from Dutch Army)
Germany (military)	2A7 A1	1 (+ 16 ordered)	Germany	Order for 17 in November 2021, delivery planned for 2024 - 2025. New variant equipped with Active Protection System Trophy. KMW manufactured 17 new chassis, and the Bundeswehr supplied 17 turrets of the Leopard 2A6A3 variant.
Germany (military)	2A8	0 (+ 123 ordered)	Germany	Orders: 2023: 18 Leopard 2A8 + option for 105; July 2024: 105 ordered (€2.93 billion); Delivery: Planned from 2026 to 2030
Germany (military)	BPz3 Büffel	75	Germany	75 in army stocks as of 2021.
Germany (military)	PiPz 3 Kodiak AEV	44	Germany	44 in army stocks as of 2021.
Germany (military)	Leguan AVLB	31	Germany	31 in army stocks as of 2021.
Greece	2A4	183	West Germany	In May 2022 it was reported that Greece was in discussions with KMW to upgrade all 183 to the 2A7 HEL standard.
Greece	2A6 HEL	170	Germany; Greece	Manufactured domestically in Greece by ELBO.
Greece	BPz3 Büffel	25	Germany	25 operated as of 2021.
Hungary	2A4	12	Germany	Contract for 12 2A4 ordered in December 2018 to prepare for the arrival of the 2A7+. All delivered by December 2020.
Hungary	2A7 HU	44	Germany	Contract for 44 2A7+ ordered in December 2018. Deliveries: first batch of 6 in December 2023; last in December 2025.
Hungary	WiSENT 2 ARV	6	Germany	Six owned as of 2021.
Hungary	BPz3 Büffel	9	Germany	Nine owned as of 2021.
Hungary	Leguan AVLB	3	Germany	Three owned as of 2021.
Indonesia	2A4+	42	West Germany; Germany	Indonesia sought and obtained approval for the purchase of 103 refurbished Leopard 2A4 tanks from Bundeswehr surplus stocks in 2013. In September 2013, the Indonesian Army received the first two Leopard 2A4 tanks. The Leopard 2s have been modified to suit Indonesia's tropical climate, and have been internally renamed as Leopard 2RI (RI for "Republic of Indonesia"), they use FN MAG, with some using M240C/D as coaxial/pintle mounted machine gun.
Indonesia	2RI	61	West Germany; Germany	About 62 of Leopard 2A4 were upgraded to Revolution standard by Rheinmetall.
Indonesia	BPz3 Büffel	4	West Germany; Germany	Purchased with refurbished Leopard 2A4+ tanks.
Indonesia	PiPz 3 Kodiak AEV	3	West Germany; Germany	Purchased with refurbished Leopard 2A4+ tanks.
Indonesia	Leguan AVLB	3	West Germany; Germany	Purchased with refurbished Leopard 2A4+ tanks.
Lithuania	2A8	0 (+ 44 ordered)	Germany; Lithuania	In July 2023, Lithuanian MoD sent a letter of intent to purchase Leopard 2 from German KMW. It was previously reported that the country seeks to acquire 54 tanks. On December 16, 2024, it was announced that the Lithuanian government had ordered 44 Leopard 2A8 with expected delivery in 2030. In December 2025, it was announced that 41 of the tanks would be built in Lithuania.
Lithuania	Leguan AVLB	0 (+ 12 ordered)	Germany; Lithuania	Ordered in January 2026. The order includes: 12 × 26-meter bridges; 24 × 14-meter bridges; transport trucks for additional bridges
Netherlands	2A6	18 (leased)	Germany	18 are currently leased from Germany and used by the joint German-Dutch 414 Tank Battalion. These were briefly considered to be donated to Ukraine, though a decision was made by the Dutch government to retain the tanks. The Royal Netherlands Army previously operated 445 Leopard 2. 330 of these were updated to 2A5 standard in 1993, and later, 188 of these were converted to 2A6 standard. The majority of these Leopard 2s were sold after the end of the Cold War. In April 2011, the Dutch Ministry of Defence announced that the last remaining tank division would be disbanded and the remaining Leopard tanks sold due to large budget cuts. In May 2011, the last tank fired the final shot at the Bergen-Hohne Training Area. They were due to be delivered to the Indonesian Army, which planned to purchase the entire Dutch stock of Leopard 2A6s. The deal was scrapped after opposition from the Dutch Parliament. The Dutch Army offered its formerly operated Leopard 2A6s for comparative tests to be conducted by the Peruvian Army for possible acquisition. By September 2013, the Leopard 2A6 had been disqualified by Peru due to logistical complexities. The Leopard 2s were eventually sold to Finland in a deal signed in January 2014 for €200 million with deliveries to start from 2015 to 2019. In September 2015, the Dutch government published that the army would have 16 tanks put out of storage. One Leopard 2 tank is exhibited at the military museum.
Netherlands	2A8	0 (+ 46 ordered, + 6 option)	Germany	Contract signed in May 2025 for 46 tanks, delivereries to start in 2028.
Netherlands	2A8 DTV	4	Germany	Contract signed in May 2025 includes 4 driver training vehicles.
Netherlands	BPz3 Büffel	25	Germany	Operates 25 ARVs as of 2021.
Netherlands	PiPz 3 Kodiak AEV	10	Germany	Operates 10 AEVs as of 2021.
Netherlands	Leguan AVLB	10	Germany	Operates 10 as of 2021.
Norway	2A4NO	36 (38 owned)	West Germany	The Norwegian Army initially purchased 52 ex-Dutch Leopard 2A4, but a number of them have since been cannibalised for spares and/or been rebuilt into support variants. Only 36 of these tanks are still active and operational as of 2023; 8 were donated to Ukraine.
Norway	2A8 NOR	0 (+ 54 ordered, + 18 option)	Germany; Norway	On 18 February 2023 it was reported the Norwegian Government had placed an order for 54 new Leopard 2A7NO tanks from KMW. Later, in the middle of June, it was announced that the 2A7 order had been upgraded to a newly specified 2A8 NOR variant. The 2A8 NOR builds on the German 2A8 model with integrated EuroTrophy APS, while having certain Norway-specific features such as Kongsberg's ICS/CORTEX-solution and Teleplan Globe's FACNAV/norBMS battlefield management systems. 37 out of 54 tanks will be assembled in Norway.
Norway	WiSENT 2 ARV	6+3	Germany	Orders: 6 in May 2015, 3 in June 2023.
Norway	WiSENT 2 AEV	6+8	Germany	Orders: 6 in September 2018, 8 additional to June 2023.
Norway	Leguan AVLB	6	Germany	6 ordered in March 2019 to KMW, deliveries during the summer 2022.
Poland	2A4	46	West Germany	The first batch of 128 Leopard 2A4s (produced between 1985 and 1987) as well as 49 other armoured vehicles (like Bergepanzer 2 ARVs and M113 family APCs) and 151 trucks and 4×4 was transferred to Poland in 2002 and 2003 for PLN 100 million. They are used by the 10th Armoured Cavalry Brigade based in Świętoszów. An additional 14 were purchased with Leopard 2A5s in 2013. See 2PL notes 14 of Poland's 100 2A4s are being donated to Ukraine; training began in early February 2023 and the first four were delivered on 24 February.
Poland	2A5	105	Germany	105 Leopard 2A5 were purchased with 14 more 2A4 and other equipment by Poland in 2013 for an estimated €180 – 200 million. The last tank was delivered on 30 November 2015.
Poland	2PL	82	West Germany; Germany; Poland	128 Leopard 2A4 were scheduled to be upgraded to Leopard 2PL standard, in a contract worth PLN 2.415 billion that was signed in December 2015. In 2018 a follow-on deal to upgrade a second batch of 14 Leopard 2 A4s was signed. As of July 2022, 45 have been converted as of February 2023. The Leopard 2PL will introduce new sighting equipment for the gunner, commander and driver, an increased protection level, an upgraded gun, an upgraded fire suppression system and the installation of an auxiliary power unit.
Poland	Leopard 2 NJ (Fahrschulpanzer)	2	Germany	Commercial buy in 2014 from Rhainmetall.
Portugal	2A6 PRT	34	Germany	37 2A6 acquired from the Netherlands in 2008, and 1 A4 for spare parts, worth €80 million. In 2010, a plan for 18 more was on the way, but was cancelled due to budget cuts. Three 2A6 donated to Ukraine in 2023. Modernisations: EID radios + Battlefield management system from Critical Software; Contract in 2025 with KNDS Deutschland, after the modernisation, it will be known as "Leopard 2 A6 PRT".
Portugal	Leopard 2 Fahrschulpanzer	1	Germany	One unit acquired in 2008 to train Leopard 2A6 new drivers.
Qatar	2A7+	62	Germany	Contract: 62 Leopard 2A7+ tanks in April 2013. Deliveries: from end 2014 to 2018. The first units were displayed at Qatar's annual national day parade in December 2015.
Qatar	WiSENT 2	6	Germany	Six owned as of 2021.
Singapore	2SG	96	West Germany; Germany	The Singapore Army acquired 96 ex-West German Leopard 2A4, including 30 spare tanks, in 2006. A number were upgraded with additional AMAP composite armour in 2010 by IBD Deisenroth and ST Kinetics and renamed Leopard 2SG in October 2010. By 2019, it was reported that Singapore had taken delivery of 158 Leopard 2A4 and 45 Leopard 2A7. However, the Singapore Government has denied that it received deliveries of Leopard 2A7*. Some reports indicate that Singapore to have received more than 224SG Leo 2 tanks so far. According to International Institute for Strategic Studies, Singapore have 96 2SG in service as of 2025.
Singapore	2A7	45*	Germany	*Not been officially confirmed. See 2SG notes.
Singapore	BPz3 Büffel	20	Germany	20 owned as of 2022.
Singapore	PiPz 3 Kodiak AEV	14	Germany; Switzerland	14 owned a of 2022.
Singapore	Leguan AVLB	10	Germany	10 owned as of 2013.
Slovakia	2A4	15	West Germany	In August 2022 the Slovak Ministry of Defence announced it will get 15 Leopards 2A4 from Germany in an exchange for its 30 tracked BMP-1 infantry fighting vehicles from reserve that will be given to Ukraine to help defend against the Russian invasion. Germany's tank package includes ammunition, training, and spare parts. Deliveries: first on 19 December 2022, third on 2 June 2023, by the 28 January 2024, all 15 were delivered.
Spain	2A4	78 (55 active)	West Germany	108 leased from Germany for training purposes in 1995, then purchased them in 1998. As of 2023, 55 were in active service with Montesa" n°3 and Alcántara n°10 Armoured Cavalery Regiments The remaining 53 have been stored in Zaragoza, 13 of which were damaged due to a flood in 1997, and remained turetless. Donations to Ukraine: 11 Leopard 2 A4 have been removed from the Zaragoza storage facility in February 2023 to be refurbished to "have the same lethality as modern Leopard 2".; On 5 April, Defence Minister Margarita Robles announced that Spain would send six Leopard 2A4s to Ukraine by the second half of April.; An additional 20 of the retired Leopard 2A4 at Zaragoza are being prepared for Ukraine, with two deliveries scheduled in June and September 2024.
Spain	2E	219	Germany; Spain	Santa Bárbara Sistemas manufactured 60% of the contract under license. 219 main battle tanks + four training tanks.
Spain	BPz3 Büffel	16	Germany	16 owned as of 2021.
Sweden	Stridsvagn 122 (2A5 equivalent)	110	Germany; Sweden	In August 1994, 160 ex-German Leopard 2A4s were leased and received minor modifications. They were used under the designation Stridsvagn 121 until the reorganisation of the Swedish Army in 2000 when they were placed in storage until the lease contract expired in 2011. Sweden acquired 120 Leopard 2 Improved tanks, which were designated Stridsvagn 122, in 1994 with some modifications. Upgrades for 88 Stridsvagn 122A and B variants to C and D standards were ordered in 2016. In 2023 Sweden delivered 10 of its 120 to Ukraine. Upgrades including the L/55 gun for 46 strv 122A variants were announced in 2023, they would be redesignated stridsvagn 123A.
Sweden	Bärgningsbandvagn 120 (BPz3 Büffel)	14	Germany	14 owned as of 2021.
Sweden	Ingenjörbandvagn 120 (PiPz 3 Kodiak AEV)	6	Germany; Switzerland	Six owned as of 2021.
Sweden	Brobandvagn 120 (Leguan AVLB)	10	Germany	Ten owned as of 2021.
Sweden	Stridsvagn 123B (Leopard 2A8)	0 (44 on order)	Germany	In January 2024 Sweden ordered 44 Leopard 2A8 tanks to be delivered in 2028 to 2031 in an order worth €2 Billion.
Switzerland	Pz 87 WE	134 (active)	West Germany; Switzerland	Modernised to the Pz 87 WE standard in 2011. See Pz 87 notes for further details.
Switzerland	Pz 87	71 (in storage)	West Germany; Switzerland	The Swiss Army purchased 380 Leopard 2A4s designated Panzer 87. 35 were manufactured by KMW and Rheinmetall, while 345 were domestically made in Switzerland. 42 were later sold back to Rheinmetall, and 12 were sold to the Canadian Army and were transformed in L2-ARV (BPz3 Büffel ARV). As of 2023, 134 upgraded Pz 87 WE tanks are active while the remaining 96 Pz 87s were decommissioned and placed in long-term storage, and 49 Pz 87 have been transformed in engineering variants since 2011 (see below). On 3 March 2023 it was reported that Germany sought to purchase an unknown number of Switzerland's 96 reserve tanks to backfill those given to Ukraine by other allies. Rheinmetall CEO Armin Papperger later confirmed in an interview the company sought to purchase 36 of these tanks. Switzerland's Security Commission voted to fully decommission 25 of the tanks, enabling their re-sale back to the German manufacturer pending approval from parliament. On 22 November, the Swiss parliament approved their export to Rheinmetall Landsysteme GmbH in Germany subject to the condition they remain within Germany, NATO, or an EU partner and not be provided to Ukraine.
Switzerland	BPz3 Büffel	25 (active)	Germany	From 2004.
Switzerland	PiPz 3 Kodiak AEV	12 (active)	Germany; Switzerland	12 Pz 87 transformed in Kodiak variants, and with it several mission modules were purchased for more flexibility: 12 modules for engineering; 6 modules for demining operations; 4 mine protection sets
Switzerland	Leguan AVLB	12 (active)	Germany	From 2018.
Turkey	2A4	250*	West Germany	354 originally purchased from Germany. At least eight visually confirmed destroyed in Syria; another 13 damaged or captured by ISIS. See Turkish intervention in Syria above for details. Others are being upgraded to the 2A4TR model. See 2A4TR notes.
Turkey	2A4TR	84	West Germany; Turkey	84 units are undergoing modernization and will be renamed as Leopard 2A4TR. The modernization program was awarded to Roketsan and the first tank was re-delivered to the Turkish Army in February 2021. The tanks undergoing modernization are being equipped with new ERA panels, fire control systems, and a full overhaul of the power transmission systems.
Ukraine	2A4	≥ 74	West Germany	As of 23 February 2023, confirmed transfers to Ukraine from army stockpiles include 14 2A4 from Poland, eight 2A4NO from Norway, eight 2A4CAN from Canada, 10 2A4 from Spain and an unknown number of battle tanks from Finland. The Netherlands agreed to help procure and supply ammunition for the tanks. Ukrainian tank operators began training on the vehicles in February 2023. The first four Leopard 2A4 tanks were delivered from Polish stocks on 24 February 2023. The remaining 10 arrived after 7 March. Norway delivered all eight tanks on 20 March 2022. Canada delivered all eight Leopard 2A4CAN by 18 April 2023. Spain delivered its first six in late April, and the remaining four by June. Rheinmetall initially claimed it could prepare up to 51 Leopard 2A4 tanks for Ukraine. However, 14 of these were instead donated to Czechia and 15 were donated to Slovakia as part of Germany's Ringtaush program. 14 were jointly purchased by the Netherlands and Denmark for Ukraine on 20 April 2024, with delivery scheduled for Q1 2024. On 19 March 2024, Spain announced it is preparing an additional 19 or 20 Leopard 2A4 tanks for Ukraine, to be delivered over two batches in June and September respectively.
Ukraine	Stridsvagn 122 (2A5 equivalent)	10	Germany; Sweden	On 24 February 2023, the Swedish Minister of Defence Pål Jonson announced that Sweden would be providing 10 Leopard 2A5 tanks to Ukraine. These are presumably domestically manufactured Stridsvagn 122 variant (2A5 equivalent) as they are the only Leopards operated by Sweden. Delivered by July 2023.
Ukraine	2A6	21	Germany	Ukraine was originally provided 14 from Germany and an additional three from Portugal. Training on the 2A6 began in Germany in February 2023 and they are expected to arrive in Ukraine in March. Germany's Defense Ministry accounced it would send an additional four Leopard 2A6 on 24 February to ensure one full tank battalion. Germany delivered all 18 tanks promised as of 27 March 2023. Portugal's Ministry of Defense confirmed that the three Leopard 2A6 pledged were also delivered to Ukraine. The leaked Pentagon documents revealed that Greece may be donating five Leopard 2A6HEL and Portugal an additional three 2A6 tanks to Ukraine, though these deliveries have not been officially confirmed by either government.
Ukraine	BPz3 Büffel	3	Germany	On 24 February 2023, Canada confirmed it would provide one of its ARVs with its next delivery of four Leopard 2 tanks. Canada delivered its BPz3 on 18 March 2023. Germany confirmed it was providing 2; both delivered by 27 March.
Ukraine	2R Breacher "Raivauspanssarivaunu Leopard 2R"	6	Germany; Finland	Finland first announced it was providing three Leopard 2R breaching tanks and an undisclosed number of main battle tanks. An additional three of the 2R breachers were later promised. Three were reportedly abandoned in battle in June 2023
United Arab Emirates	WiSENT 2 AEV	4	Germany	First ordered in 2016. Four owned as of 2021.

=== Potential sales ===
Austria (18)
Austria is planning to purchase Leopard 2A8 battalion (around 18 Leopard 2A8).
Brazil (65)
The Brazilian Army is looking to purchase 65 main battle tanks. For budget reason, Germany is offering second-hand tanks, which would be 65 Leopard 2A6 that are in the German Army.
Czech Republic (14)
There is an option for 14 Leopard 2 in support tanks with the order signed in September 2025.
Germany (75)
The BAAINBW is planning to order 75 Leopard 2A8 in 2026.
As of July 2025, the German Army was planning to purchase up to 1,000 tanks prior to the arrival of the MGCS. Part of those will be the Leopard 2A8. The majority is expected to be an intermediate solution, a Leopard 3 developed by PSM.
Netherlands (6)
There is an option for 6 additional tanks with the order signed in May 2025.
Norway (18)
There is an option for 18 additional tanks with the order signed in February 2023.
Spain
The Spanish Army is considering the replacement of the Leopard 2A4 by the Leopard 2A8, and potentially to modernise the Leopard 2E.

=== Failed bids ===
Australia
The Australian Army evaluated ex-Swiss Army Leopard 2s as a replacement for its Leopard 1AS tanks in 2003, but selected the M1A1 AIM instead due to easier logistics. More modern versions of the Leopard 2 or M1 Abrams, such as the Leopard 2A6, were not considered due to their higher price.
Bulgaria
The Bulgarian Ministry of Defence has been interested in purchasing a minimum of 24 units of the Leopard 2A6 variant. The deal has received support from a military budget increase to 2% of GDP by 2016 in the new Bulgarian budget, and a military pledge to spend €2.2 billion on new armaments for the Bulgarian military. As of 2023 no purchase has been made of the Leopard 2, and the Bulgarian government instead purchased 183 Stryker armoured vehicles from the United States as part of its efforts to modernize its army.
Italy
In March 2023 it was reported that the Italian Army was considering the purchase of up to 250 Leopard 2A7 tanks for roughly €8 billion. In July of the same year, Italy's Defence undersecretary Isabella Rauti said that her government is planning to buy no less than 125 Leopard 2A8 MBT and support variants, with initial funds worth 4 billion euros ($4.5 billion) from 2024 (inside the multi-year defence budget of 2023–2025) to purchase the new tanks and upgrade other military hardware. On 22 February 2024 the Italian Parliament's Defence Committee approved the acquisition of 132 main battle tanks and up to 140 support variants. The variants include an armoured engineering vehicle, an armoured recovery vehicle Büffel, and an armoured vehicle-launched bridge. In the end, the agreement with KNDS did not go through, and Leonardo collaborated with Rheinmetall, and will purchase tanks based on the KF-51 Panther.
Peru
The Dutch Army offered its formerly operated Leopard 2A6s for comparative tests to be conducted by the Peruvian Army for possible acquisition. By September 2013, the Leopard 2A6 had been disqualified by Peru due to logistical complexities.
Romania
As part of a modernization program, since 2019 the Romanian Army considered acquisition of Leopard 2 tanks. However, in March 2023 Romania's Ministry of Defense announced to purchase M1 Abrams tanks from the United States.
Saudi Arabia
The Saudi Arabian government sought to buy Leopard 2A7s (total of 600–800 desired). In early July 2011, the German press reported that the Bundessicherheitsrat (Federal Security Council) approved the sale by KMW of more than 200 units of the 2A7+ tanks to Saudi Arabia. This news was met with criticism both inside and outside of Germany, because of the autocratic nature of the Saudi Arabian state and its involvement in repressing popular protests in the neighbouring country of Bahrain. Criticism also came from within the Chancellor Angela Merkel's government coalition, and later from within KMW. In June 2012, reports surfaced that Saudi Arabia had raised the number of tanks it was interested in to 600–800. A contract was never finalized, and the issue was debated both in the German public and in Germany's federal parliament. In April 2014, a German newspaper reported that the deal for Leopard 2 tanks for Saudi Arabia was likely to be cancelled due to opposition from the Federal Economy Minister at that time, Social Democrat Sigmar Gabriel. In 2015, Germany blocked the sale of Leopard 2 tanks to Saudi Arabia. In 2016, the Saudi Arabian ambassador to Germany stated that Saudi Arabia was no longer interested in purchasing Leopard tanks and suggested that the issue was being exploited for internal political gain.
Slovenia
The Slovenian government had announced its intention to send its tank fleet of old Yugoslav M-84 and Soviet T-72 tanks to Ukraine in exchange for German Leopard 2 tanks and Marder Infantry Fighting Vehicles in 2022. But Slovenia then provided Ukraine with only older T-55 Soviet tanks prompting Germany to withhold its promised Leopard 2 tanks and giving only Marder Infantry Fighting Vehicles to Slovenia.
United Kingdom
The Leopard 2 was tested by the United Kingdom. In 1989 the Leopard 2 was evaluated as a possible replacement for the Challenger 1 tank. Ultimately the British armed forces decided to adopt the locally made Challenger 2.

== See also ==
- Leopard 3
- List of main battle tanks by generation
- Panther KF51
- Tanks in the German Army

== Bibliography ==
- Jerchel, Michael; Schnellbacher, Uwe (1998). Leopard 2 Main Battle Tank 1979–1998. London: Osprey Publishing. ISBN 978-1-85532-691-0. OCLC 40544103.
- Kelly, Orr (1989). "The Five-Billion-Dollar Half Inch". King of the Killing Zone. New York: W. W. Norton & Company. pp. 187–188. ISBN 0-425-12304-9.
- Krapke, Paul W. (June 2004). Leopard 2 sein Werden und seine Leistung [Leopard 2 becoming and achievement] (in German). Books on Demand. ISBN 978-3-83341425-1.
- Scheibert, Michael (1996). Leopard 2 A5 Euro-Leopard (in German). Wölfersheim-Berstadt: Pudzun-Pallas-Verlag. ISBN 3-7909-0576-3.
- Scheibert, Michael; Schneider, Wolfgang (1986). Leopard 2 Ein Spitzenprodukt deutscher Wehrtechnik [Leopard 2 a top product of German military technology] (in German). Dorheim: Pudzun-Pallas-Verlag. ISBN 3-7909-0265-9.
