= Improvised vehicle armour =

Makeshift armour installed on vehicles

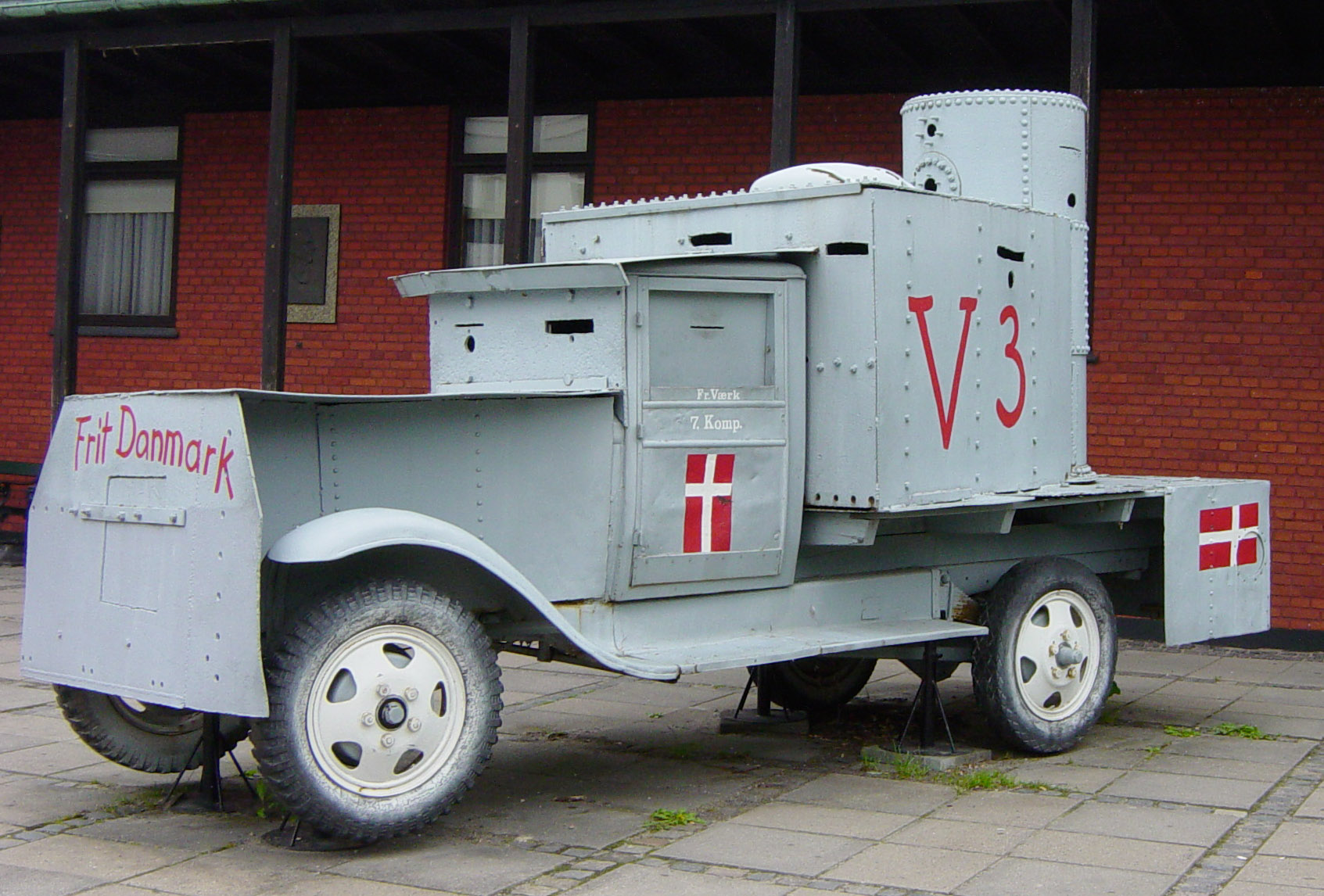
Improvised armour added to a truck by railway shop workers for the Danish resistance movement near the end of World War II

Improvised vehicle armour is a form of vehicle armour consisting of protective materials added to a vehicle such as a car, truck, or tank in an irregular and extemporized fashion using available materials. Typically, improvised armour is added in the field and it was not originally part of the design, an official up-armour kit, nor centrally planned and distributed. Improvised armour is used to protect occupants from small arms, crew-served weapons, artillery (or tank gun) fire, and anti-tank mines. Improvised additions have included metal plate, scrap metal, sandbags, concrete, wood, and, since at least the 2000s, Kevlar. These materials vary widely in their ballistic protection.

Improvised vehicle armour has appeared on the battlefield for as long as vehicles have been used in combat. Though usually used in military or conflict contexts, improvised vehicle armour has also been used in non-combat contexts, such as to protect the vehicles of strikebreakers.

== History ==
=== World War I ===
The first armoured cars to see combat in World War I were entirely improvised, although this soon changed as the war continued. A few were used by the Belgian Army during the German invasion. The British Royal Naval Air Service received reports of this and converted some of their own cars. Improvised conversion continued until December 1914 when the first standardized design entered service. The British Royal Naval Air Service in Dunkirk sent teams in cars to find and rescue downed reconnaissance pilots in the battle areas. They mounted machine guns on them and as these excursions became increasingly dangerous, they improvised boiler plate armouring on the vehicles using metal provided by a local shipbuilder.

=== World War II ===
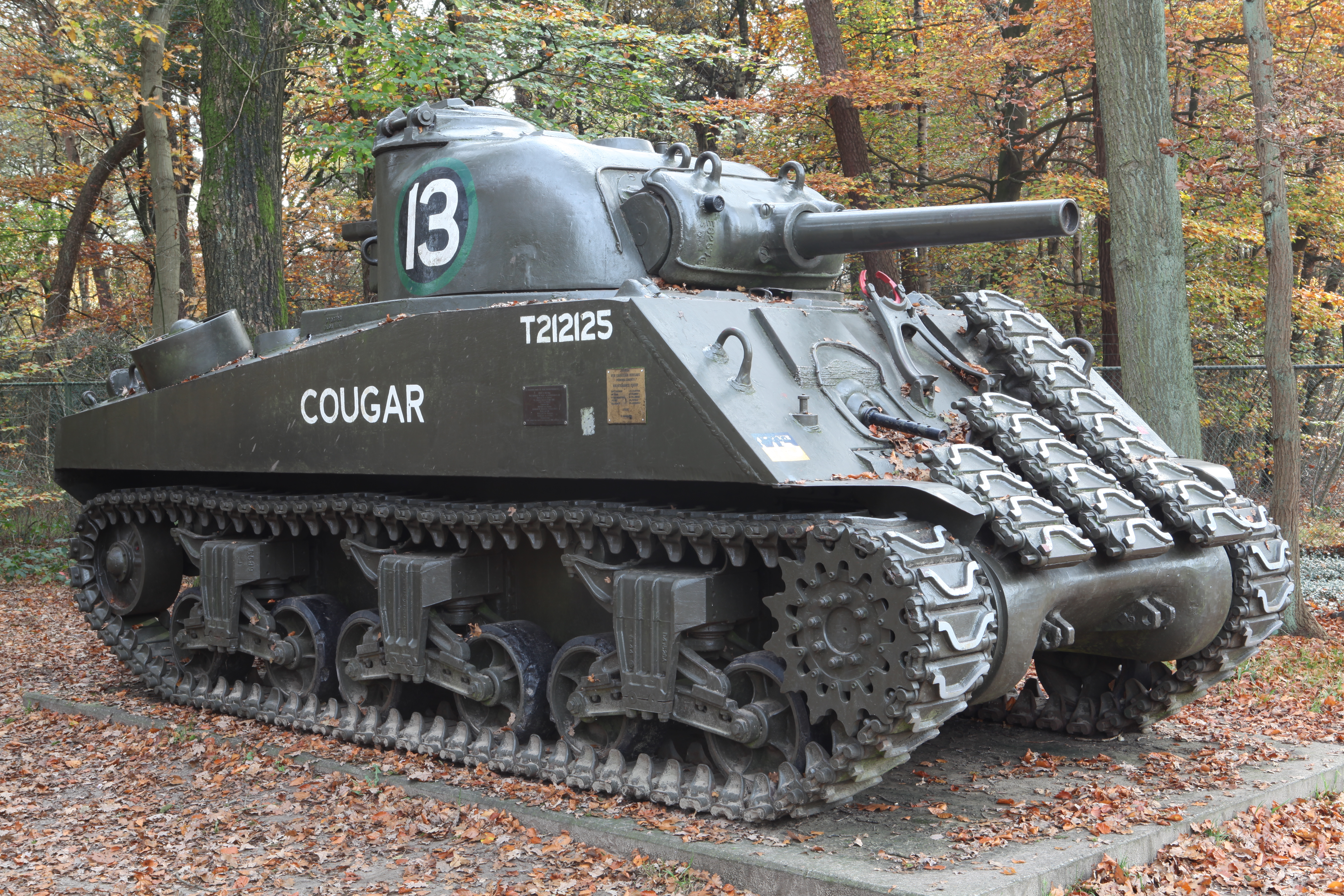
An M4 (105) Sherman with spare track-links welded onto its sloped frontal glacis-plate for additional armoured protection, shown here at Langenberg Liberation Memorial in Ede, Netherlands

Most armies involved in World War II adopted some form of improvised armour at some point. The Home Guard in the United Kingdom equipped itself with a number of vehicles with improvised armour, such as the Bison concrete armoured lorry, intended to be used for defending airfields. Later in 1944, some Cromwell and Churchill tanks had sections of tracks attached to their existing armour to provide yet more extra protection. US M8 Greyhound armoured car crews would sometimes line the floors of their vehicles with sandbags to provide extra protection against landmines, this was also done with most light vehicles, the Jeeps were well known to have many field modifications done; even the M113s would see sandbags piled on the floor for the same reason.

The addition of improvised armour to tanks was performed by both Axis and Allies forces due to the arms race between the designers of antitank weapons and the designers of tank armour. In some cases, a tank that was effectively protected against existing antitank weapons at the time of its manufacture ended up, once finally tested and delivered to the battlefield, being vulnerable to newly designed antitank weapons. As such, tank crews would ask field repair workshops to increase their protection, using a wide range of armouring principles, including welded or bolted on metal "skirts" around treads and turrets (spaced armour) and welded screens (slat armour). Some German improvised armour was designed to protect weak points, such as sandbags added by Afrika Korps tank crews to the turret joint. On the Eastern Front, some tank crews added sandbags due to fears of magnetic mines.

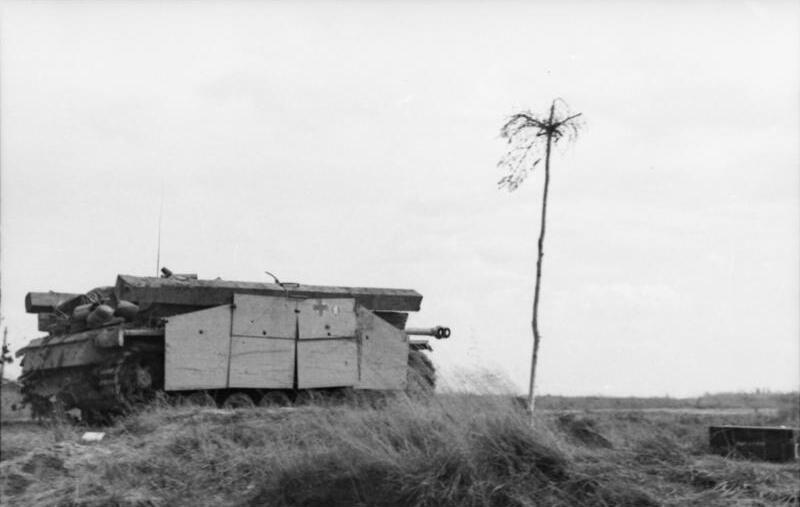
A Sturmgeschütz III with added spaced armour and large wooden beams.

The German military became aware of these improvised armour approaches used by their troops and issued a recommendation against using most of them in 1944 in the Nachrichtenblatt der Panzertruppen (Newsletter for the Armoured Forces). While the German military was aware that improvised armour boosted tank crews' morale (by giving a sense of increased security) the analysts argued that many improvised armouring techniques were not effective. For example, welding spare tank treads to a turret was not effective, as treads were not armour-grade steel, and concrete was found to offer little protection while also leading to excess fragmentation. Some improvised armour, such as adding concrete or welding on tank treads on an 80 to 90-degree angle, actually made enemy weapons more effective, and both approaches overtaxed the tanks' powertrains from the extra weight.

Welding on improvised Schürzen (skirting) was not permitted, due to concerns that welding the original factory plate armour could weaken it; however, using brackets to mount turret-side and back skirts or side skirts was permitted. Side skirts were permitted because the Soviet 14,5 mm antitank rifles could penetrate the less-armoured sides of the Panzer.

Some US tanks had spare tracks attached to their armour. This was done with the M4 Sherman and Stuart tanks. Besides spare track-links, other improvised armour included wooden logs, tree trunks, armour plating from other destroyed or abandoned tanks and even a thick layer of concrete, albeit the lattermost very rarely. Concrete was sometimes added above the driver to protect the thinner roof above a driver from antitank rifle fire coming from above. Sandbags would also be stacked on a Sherman's front plate and arranged on the turret roof to protect the crew from ricochets when looking out the hatches or using the MGs. US tanks in the Pacific theater would also weld nails or cages to their hatches and make improvised track skirts to counter Japanese anti-tank attacks; wood was also common as an anti-magnetic measure.

Soviet tank crews sometimes welded makeshift metal frames to their tanks to protect against shaped charge explosives such as the German Panzerfaust anti-tank weapon. Commonly referred to as "Bed Frames", and while there does exist the possibility some were actual bed frames, it instead refers to the officially issued steel mesh frames, which resembled common bed frames at a glance. The "Bed Frame" was an early version of modern slat armour, which was used in the 2000s to protect tanks against rocket-propelled grenades such as the RPG-7.

During the North African Campaign, the German Afrika Korps attached strips of spare tracks to the front of their Panzer IIIs and Panzer IVs. Elsewhere, such as on the Eastern Front and in Italy, the German military also relied on add-on plates of armour of varying thickness (including the well-known Schürzen add-on side armour plating), cement and timber to increase the armour of their tracked combat vehicles, especially those with weaker armour like the Marder series of self-propelled anti-tank guns and the StuG III (many of these were given either timber, concrete, additional armour plating or spare tracks to increase their battlefield survivability). Most German vehicles exported to their allies in the war also carried such forms of armour, such as StuG IIIs sent to Finland, which carried both log (on the sides) and concrete (frontally) armour.

=== Vietnam War ===
In the Vietnam War, U.S. gun trucks were armoured with sandbags and locally fabricated steel armour plate.

=== Troubles ===
During The Troubles, the Provisional Irish Republican Army used several types of improvised tactical vehicles.

=== Strike of 1984 ===
During the 1984 UK miners' strike, buses used for transporting strikebreakers to work were armoured against attacks by strikers by fitting metal bars to their windows. These improvised armoured buses were nicknamed "battle buses".

=== Iraq War ===
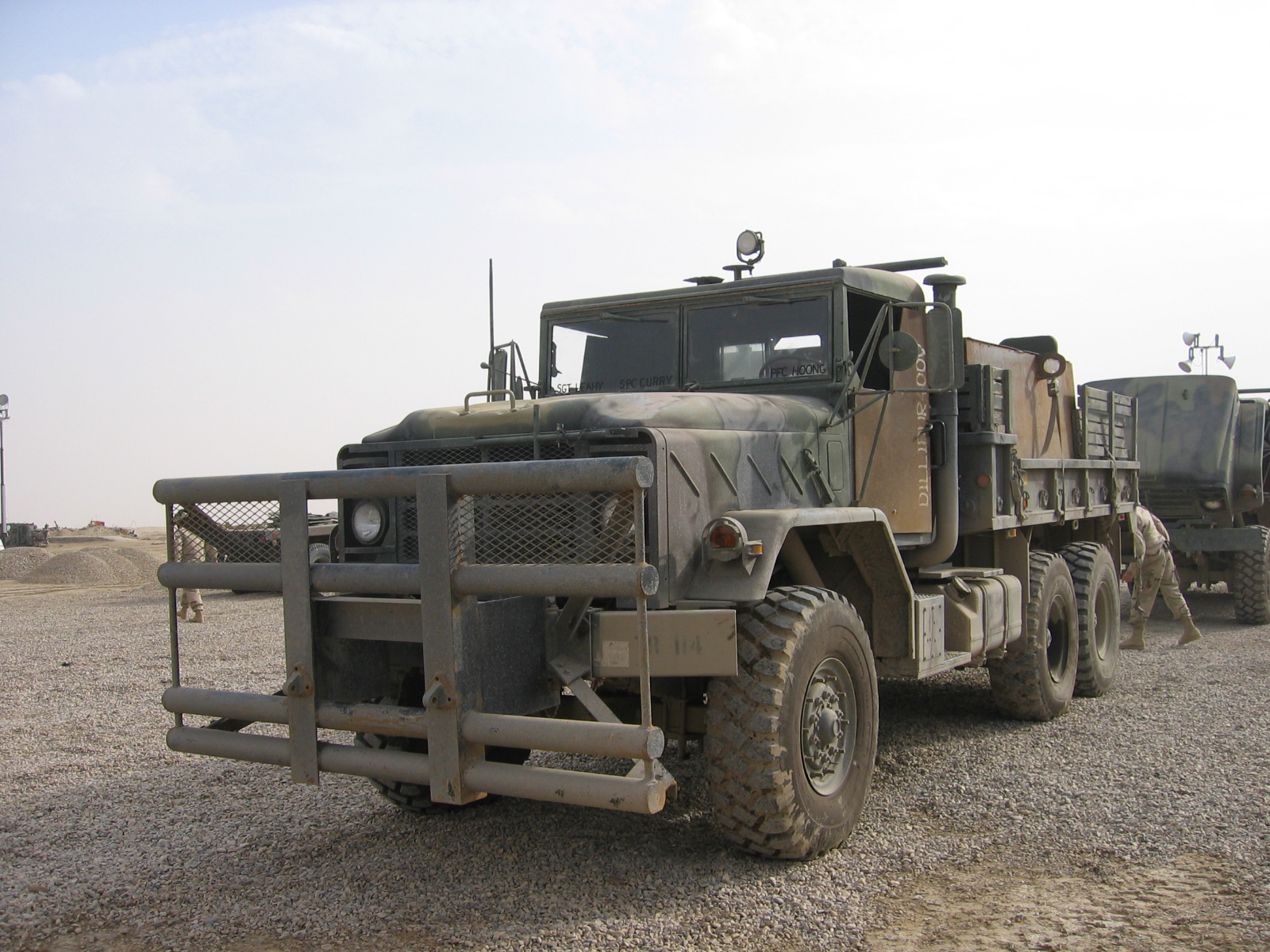
A U.S. Army 5-ton cargo truck with improvised armour on the doors, rear gunner's box, and an improved bumper

During the Iraq War, improvised vehicle armour was colloquially referred to as "hillbilly armor", "farmer armor" or "hajji armor" by American troops.

During the occupation that followed the 2003 invasion that toppled Saddam Hussein's regime, insurgent forces deployed roadside bombs, RPG teams, and snipers with small arms to attack military vehicles on supply convoys and other known routes.

To protect themselves from these threats, American troops began reinforcing their Humvees, LMTVs and other vehicles with whatever was available, including scrap metal, kevlar blankets and vests, compromised ballistic glass and plywood. In some cases they relied on Iraqis to assist them in these efforts, and referred to the result as "hajji" armour. They were also officially advised to line the floors of their Humvees with sandbags to deaden the impact of IED and land mine explosions.

Some officers in Iraq were disciplined over their refusal to carry out missions in what they considered improperly armoured vehicles.

Hungarian troops were said to be covering their non-armoured Mercedes-Benz G-Class vehicles with ballistic vests on the outside.

==== Military-supplied "up-armour" ====
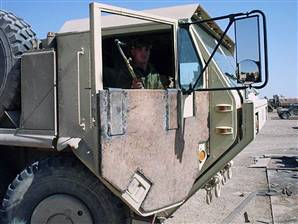
"Hillbilly" scrap armour plate on door of U.S. Army 8x8 HEMTT at a base at Ar-Ramadi, Iraq

The US Army began deploying "up-armour" kits to better protect military vehicles in August 2003, two years before the Marine Corps would. Three levels of "up-armour" were implemented:

- Level I: fully integrated armour installed during vehicle production or retrofit (including ballistic windows)
- Level II: add-on armour (including ballistic windows)
- Level III: locally fabricated armour (interim solution, lacking ballistic windows)

The process of up-armouring all vehicles was to be complete by mid-2005.

As recently as February 2006, the Army was welding additional armour onto the armoured Humvee variant M1114 and five-ton MTV in Iraq.

The United States Marines developed their own marine armour kit (MAK), consisting of bolt-on armour for the crew compartment, ballistic glass, suspension upgrades, and air conditioning. However, the kit was not fielded until early 2005, and even then only to certain specified units. Level I armour kits are now phasing out MAKs for MTVRs and M1114 HMMWVs.

=== Marvin Heemeyer ===
In the Marvin Heemeyer incident, a disgruntled man built an improvised armoured bulldozer and attacked buildings and police. The machine used in the incident was a modified Komatsu D355A bulldozer, fitted with makeshift armour plating covering the cabin, engine, and parts of the tracks. In places, this armour was over 1 foot (30 cm) thick, consisting of 5000-PSI Quikrete concrete mix fitted between sheets of tool steel (acquired from an automotive dealer in Denver), to make ad-hoc composite armour. This made the machine impervious to small arms fire and resistant to explosives: three external explosions and more than 200 rounds of ammunition were fired at the bulldozer and had no effect on it.

=== Rumsfeld questioning incident ===
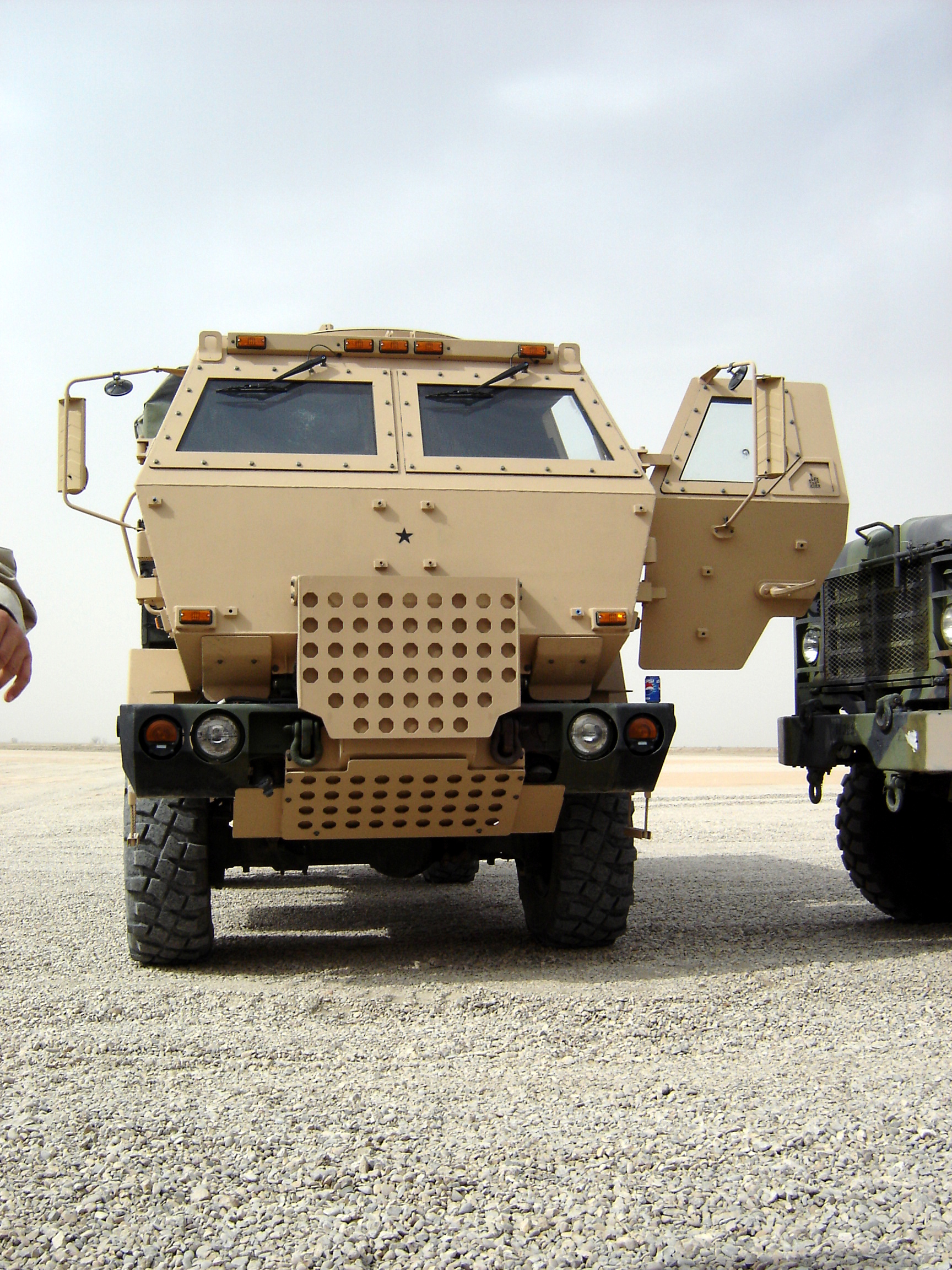
A U.S. Army LMTV cargo truck with up-armoured cab

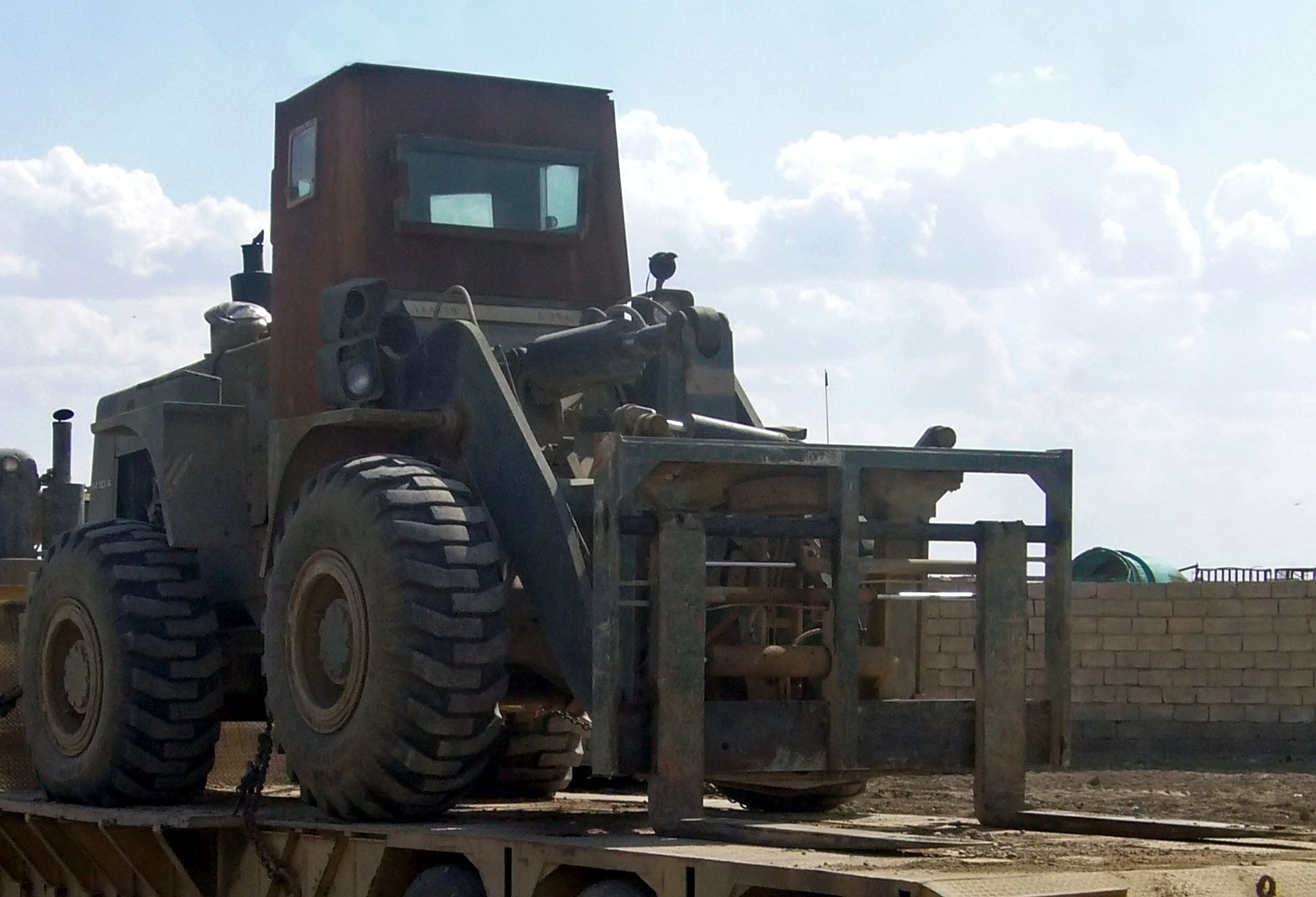
A 10K forklift outfitted with hillbilly armour protecting its cab

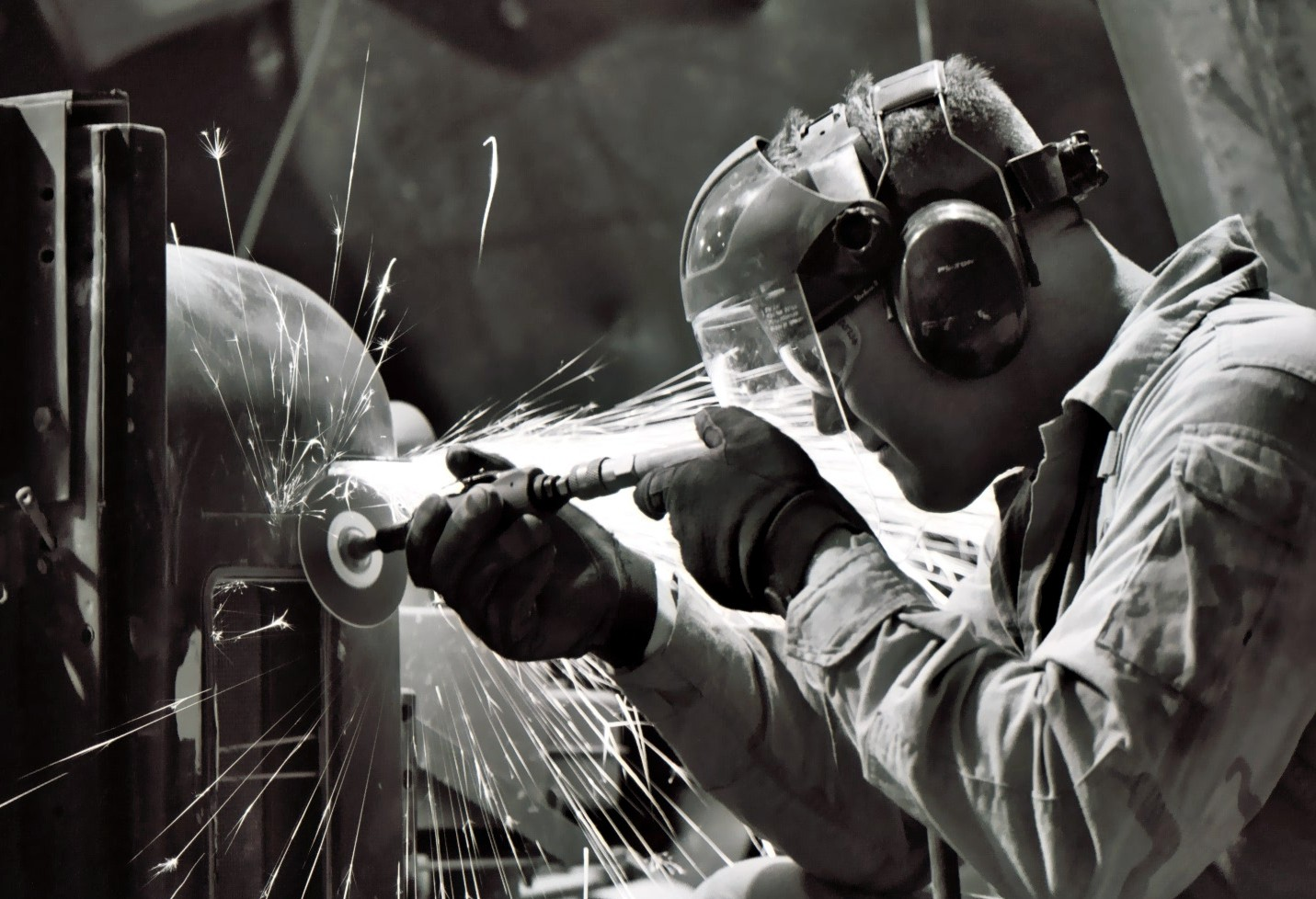
An airman works on a truck as part of an expanded program to improve the armoured protection for U.S. troops. Balad Air Base, Iraq (April 2005).

The practice of U.S. troops reinforcing their vehicles with improvised armour became well known after a U.S. soldier questioned U.S. Secretary of Defense Donald Rumsfeld about the need to salvage armour from scrap materials on 8 December 2004, at Camp Buehring, Kuwait. The question was met with cheers from fellow troops.

Wilson: "Why do we soldiers have to dig through local landfills for pieces of scrap metal and compromised ballistic glass to up-armour our vehicles? And why don't we have those resources readily available to us?"

Rumsfeld: "It isn't a matter of money. It isn't a matter on the part of the Army of desire. It's a matter of production and capability of doing it. As you know, ah, you go to war with the army you have – not the army you might want or wish to have at a later time. You can have all the armour in the world on a tank and (still) be blown up..."

Rumsfeld was paying a visit to approximately 2,300 troops on the eve of their deployment across the border to Iraq. Specialist Thomas Wilson of the 278th Regimental Combat Team (Tennessee Army National Guard) asked the question, but it was later revealed that Lee Pitts, an embedded reporter for the Chattanooga Times Free Press, had asked Wilson to make the inquiry.

Several related questions were asked of Rumsfeld by other troops. Some of Wilson's fellow soldiers and commanders supported his inquiry in later interviews. Col. John Zimmermann, staff judge advocate of Wilson's unit said that 95 per cent of the unit's 300 vehicles lacked appropriate armour, and suggested that it was the result of a double standard used to equip the National Guard as compared with active-duty forces.

On 9 December 2004, President George W. Bush responded to the incident, saying that the expressed concerns were being addressed.

On 10 December 2004, it was reported that following the incident, Armor Holdings, Inc., the company producing armoured Humvees for the Army, was asked to increase production from 450 to 550 per month—its maximum capacity. Also on 10 December, Congressman Marty Meehan (D-MA, House Armed Services Committee) issued a news release harshly critical of the Bush administration and The Pentagon: Meehan described the shortage of armoured vehicles as "a dangerously exposed center of gravity" of America's military presence in Iraq, and the lack of preparedness for insurgent tactics such as deploying improvised explosive devices (IEDs) as "symptomatic of a headlong rush to war."

On 15 December 2004, the Department of Defense held a special briefing on the issue of up-armouring. Officials stated that the process of up-armouring SPC Wilson's unit was nearly complete on 8 December, and was completed within 24 hours of the incident. Brig. Gen. Jeff Sorenson, Deputy for Acquisition Systems Management, stated during the briefing that fully armoured vehicles had been isolated and destroyed in the former Soviet Union's campaigns in Afghanistan and Chechnya, and that the hearts and minds aspect of the Army's counterinsurgency efforts would be negatively impacted were soldiers to remain isolated from the populace in fully armoured vehicles.

The incident sparked criticism of Rumsfeld, and led some to question the nation's commitment to its troops.

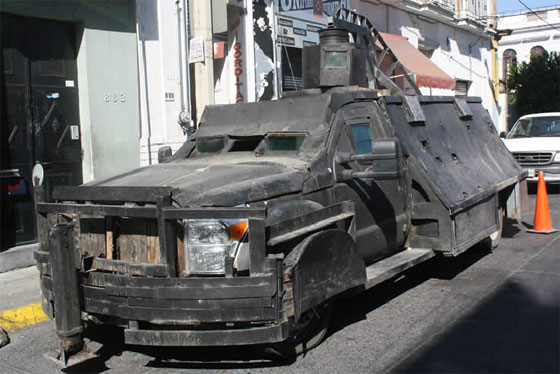
A captured Monstruo ("narco tank"), an improvised armoured Ford F-350 used by Mexican drug cartels.

=== Mexican drug War ===
Drug cartels involved in the Mexican drug war have in a number of cases fitted improvised armour to heavy trucks.

=== Libyan civil war ===
During the 2011 Libyan civil war, anti-Gaddafi forces were seen operating T-55 tanks and technicals (trucks with mounted machine guns and other crew served weapons) with improvised armour mounted on them, likely in an attempt to improve survivability against superior Libyan Army hardware such as T-72 tanks.

=== Russo-Ukrainian War ===
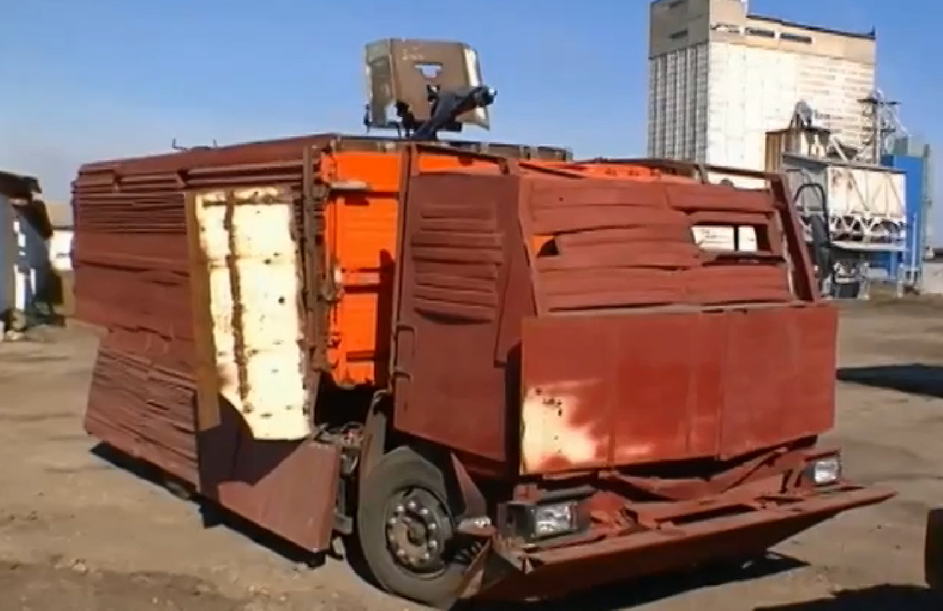
Metal plates welded onto a truck in Ukraine

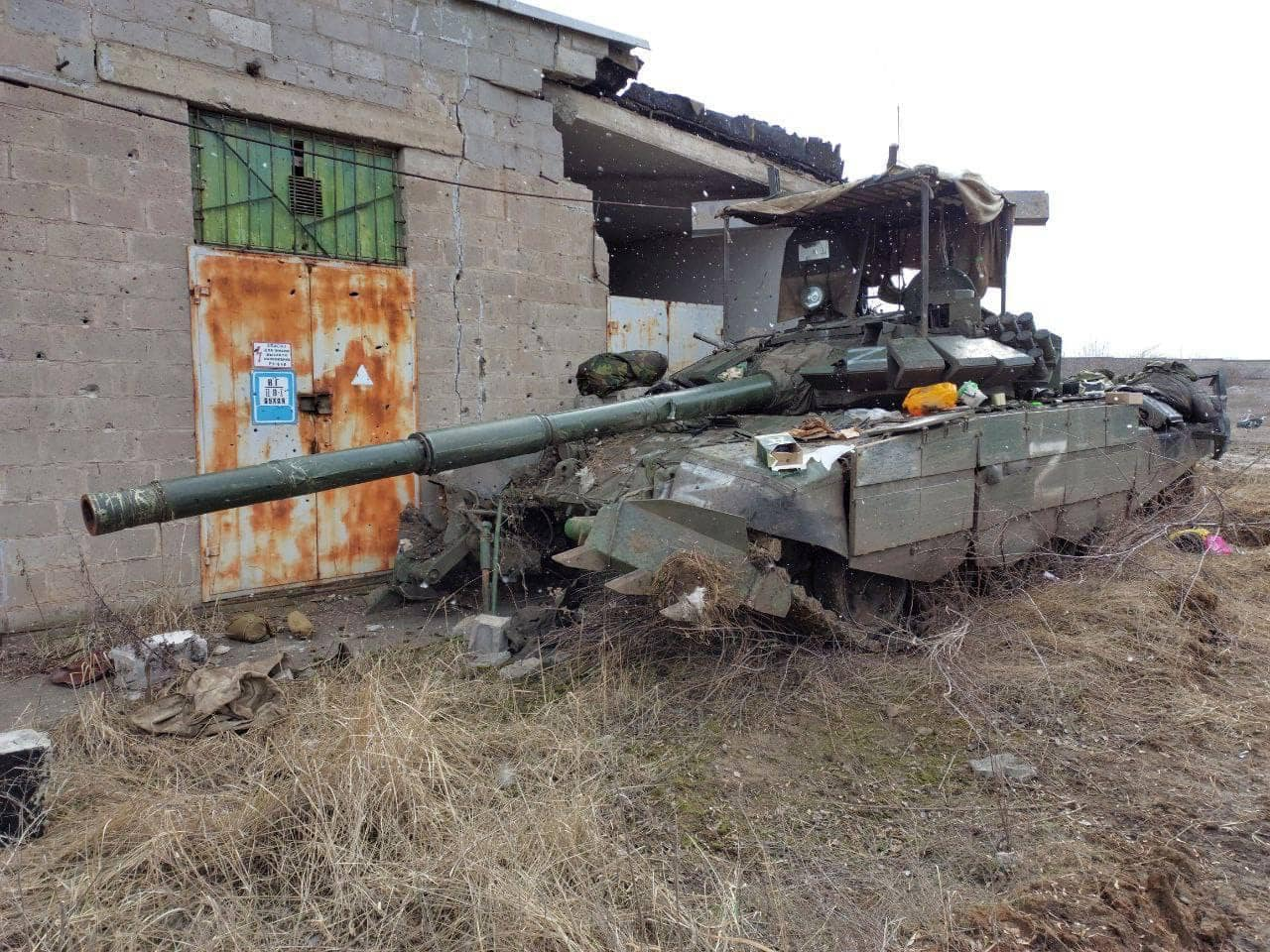
A neutralised and abandoned Russian T-72B3M tank with makeshift slat armour attached to the turret, during the 2022 Russian invasion of Ukraine.

During the war in Donbas, units on both sides of the conflict improvised and experimented with adding armour to vehicles like trucks or BTR-80 amphibious armoured personnel carriers or similar.

In late 2021, various Russian tanks were observed with top-mounted improvised slat armour made from steel grilles. In December 2021, the Ukrainian Army released video of a military exercise in which an armoured fighting vehicle (apparently a BTR mated to a T-64-like turret) protected by armour of this sort was destroyed by one of the two Javelin missiles fired. However, the actual combat effectiveness of this style of armour was still unknown. In 2022, during the Russian invasion of Ukraine where it saw combat usage, it was pejoratively referred to as "emotional support armour" or "cope cages" among online communities, as an expression of skepticism over their effectiveness. Military analysts have suggested that the armour was most likely designed in an attempt to mitigate the threat of top-attack weapons such as the FGM-148 Javelin, alternatively against RPGs fired from above in cities, loitering munitions and drone attacks. In May 2022, it was reported in Russian media interviews with Russian tankers who had returned from Ukraine that their crews eventually removed the cages, as they obstructed the use of machine guns and radios, and prevented timely evacuation if the tank caught fire. In June 2022 similar structures were seen on some Russian deployed T-62 tanks. In May 2023 a Russian T-72B3 was seen with improvised top armour with explosive reactive armour bricks mounted on it.

After the invasion Russian forces began to add improvised armour to their trucks. First in the form of scrap metal, logs and armoured panels from armoured vehicles such as APCs and later in the form of more form-fitting welded plates.

Improvised armour has also been employed by the Ukrainian army, and has been observed repeatedly in the battlefield on howitzers, IFVs, tanks and foreign-donated equipment.

=== Syrian civil war and conflict against the Islamic State ===
In their role in the ongoing Syrian Kurdish–Islamist conflict and Syrian civil war and finding themselves lacking in the amount of modern armour, members of the Kurdistan peshmerga and People's Protection Units (YPG) were reported to have fabricated homemade armoured fighting vehicles of widely varying designs to fight ISIS militants, who are armed with captured modern armour. Many of the improvised vehicles were converted tractors and farm equipment fitted with Soviet-era guns, some with elaborate paint schemes and designs. Western commentators and reporters have likened the appearance of some of these vehicles as like the makeshift vehicles featured in the Mad Max post-apocalyptic action multi-media franchise. The allied Free Syrian Army rebels have also been reported to have fashioned similar makeshift armoured fighting vehicles.

ISIS made some use of improvised armoured fighting vehicles using metal pipes as armour.

=== Battle of Marawi ===
During the Battle of Marawi, the ground forces of the Philippines' Army and Marine Corps used wooden armour plating on their armoured personnel carriers such as the GKN Simba, V-150, M113A2 and Marine LAV-300 FSV/APC to protect against rocket propelled grenades fired from the Maute and Abu Sayyaf terrorists in the city.

=== Storm chasers ===
In recent years, some storm chasers in the United States have developed purpose-made vehicles, such as the Tornado Intercept Vehicles designed to survive the hostile environment inside a tornado. These vehicles are built on truck and SUV chassis with heavy armour shells built onto them consisting of steel, kevlar, polycarbonate, and Rhino Linings to protect against airborne debris.

== See also ==
- Armadillo armoured fighting vehicle
- Bison concrete armoured lorry
- Improvised fighting vehicle
- Improvised tactical vehicles of the Provisional IRA
- Jury-rigging
- Narco tank
- Plastic armour
- Killdozer
