= Armadillo (armoured truck) =

British armoured fighting vehicle

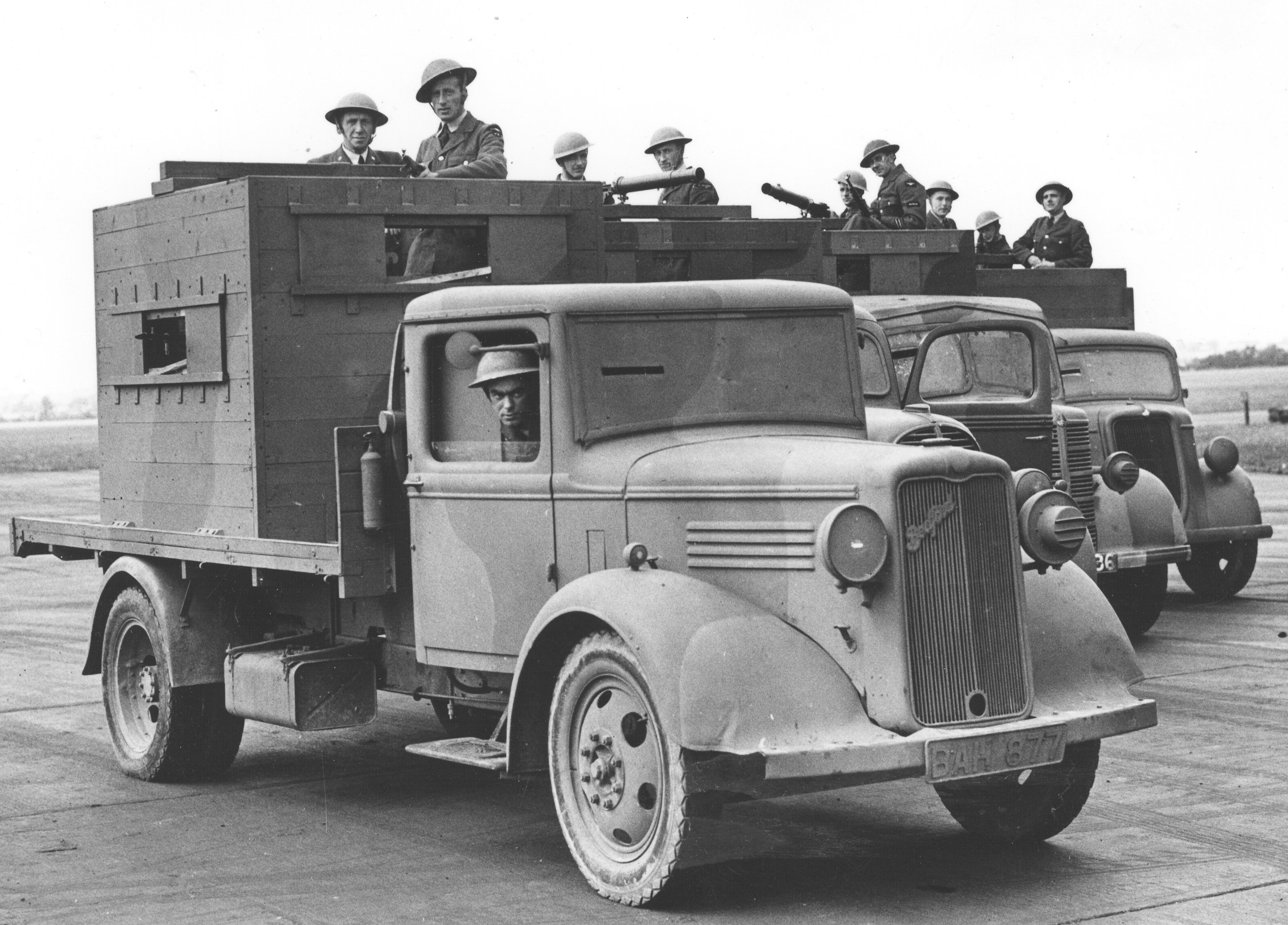
- Bedford OYD Armadillo Mk I
- Type: Improvised armoured truck
- Place of origin: United Kingdom

Service history
- In service: 1940 – 1942
- Used by: RAF Regiment; Home Guard
- Wars: World War II

Production history
- Manufacturer: Bedford Vehicles
- Produced: 1940 – 1941
- No. built: 877

Specifications
- Crew: 5
- Armour: Wood, gravel and steel plate
- Main armament: Mk I, Mk II: 1-3 × .303 Lewis machine guns; Mk III: 1 × 37 mm (1.5 in) COW autocannon; 1-3 × .303 Lewis machine guns
- Secondary armament: Crew's personal weapons
- Drive: 4×2
- Suspension: Leaf spring

The Armadillo was an extemporized improvised armoured truck produced in Britain during the invasion crisis of 1940–1941. Based on a number of standard lorry (truck) chassis, it comprised a wooden fighting compartment protected by a layer of gravel and a driver's cab protected by mild steel plates. Armadillos were used by the RAF Regiment to protect aerodromes and by the Home Guard.

== Design ==
With the Fall of France in July 1940, it was a possibility that Germany might attempt to invade Britain. The British Government made frantic efforts to prepare to meet the threatened invasion. One particular problem was the defence of airfields against parachuting airborne troops.

An ideal solution to the problem of protecting the open space of an airfield would be to make use of armoured fighting vehicles such as tanks and armoured cars. However, the British Army lacked heavy equipment, having been forced to abandon much of it during the evacuation from Dunkirk. An alternative would be an improvised armoured fighting vehicle that did not compete for resources with conventional armaments. The form of vehicle that the Royal Air Force (RAF) needed was outlined:

In considering the most suitable type of vehicle it is necessary to visualise the form of attack to which an RAF Station is most likely to be subjected. Experience to date indicates that the first phase will probably be the dropping of large numbers of parachute troops outside the aerodrome boundaries under cover of an intensive low-flying attack on the station buildings and perimeter defence posts. In this way the enemy will hope to surround the aerodrome and the second phase, probably following almost immediately, would be a concerted attack by the parachutists with the object of finally overpowering the defence posts thus clearing the way for the immediate landing of large numbers of troop-carrying aircraft upon the aerodrome itself.

— Armadillos: improved fighting vehicles for airfield defence, AIR 2/7212

The RAF started looking for a suitable vehicle at the end of May 1940 and by 4 June they settled on the design destined to be known as the Armadillo. This vehicle was a flat-bed truck, on the back of which was mounted a box-like fighting compartment in which soldiers could stand and fire small arms or use one or two crew-served weapons. The box exterior was made of 7/8 inch (22 mm) thick wooden boards measuring about 4 feet (1.2 m) by 5 feet 2 inches (1.57 m) and standing 4 feet 6 inches (1.37 m) high. Inside this was another, similar wooden box about 6 in (150 mm) smaller all round; the gap between the boxes was filled with gravel.

This provided protection from rifle and machine gun bullets. (Note: War Office. Military Training Pamphlet No 30, Part V: Protective Works. 1941. p. 39 specifies nine inches of gravel between one inch thick boards as being safe against rifle bullets.) The fighting compartment had an embrasure on each side, these were about 8 inches (200 mm) high by 18 inches (460 mm) wide and fitted with sliding steel shutters. The fighting compartment had an open top with a beam across it to support a Lewis Gun (a light machine gun) on a sliding mount. The drivers and the engine were protected by steel plates. Most Armadillos were armed with two Lewis Guns and three rifles.

== Variants ==
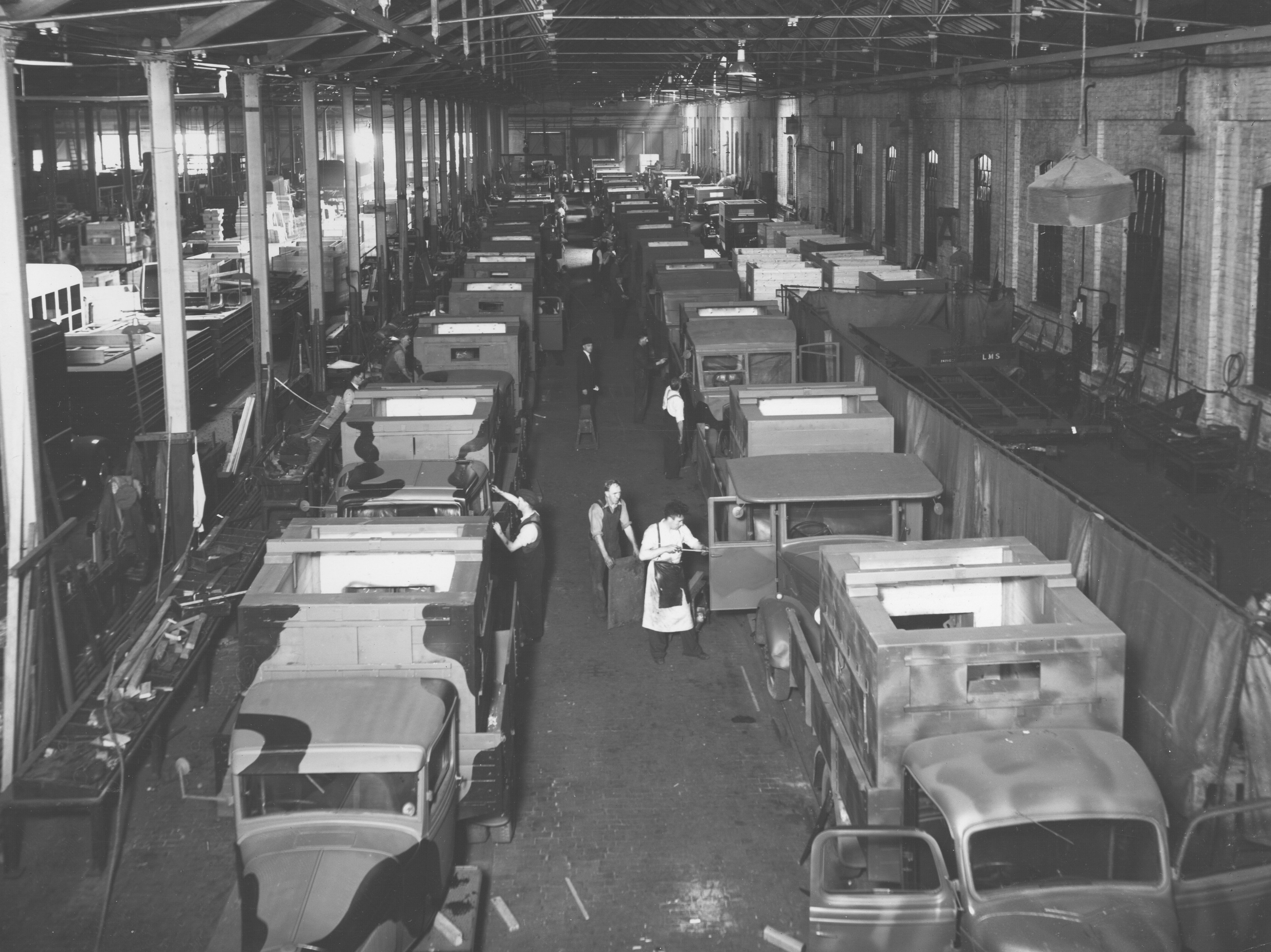
Mk I Armadillos on the Wolverton production line

The Mk I Armadillo was produced with startling speed. Using a wide range of trucks conscripted from civilian service, the first 20 were delivered on 7 June and the complete consignment of 312 vehicles within just a couple of weeks.

On 20 June, the Air Ministry ordered another 300 vehicles; these vehicles were the Mk II Armadillo. They were built using military trucks instead of civilian models, mostly be based on a standard Bedford OX 1½-ton chassis and Bedford OY 3-ton chassis. Approximately 295 were built.

A later Mk III Armadillo was always based on the Bedford OY 3-ton chassis, it had a slightly smaller fighting compartment now occupying only the front half of the truck's flat bed. On the rear half of the flat bed, a 37mm Coventry Ordnance Works gun was mounted. The COW gun was a 37 mm clip-loaded long-recoil autocannon designed at the end of the First World War for arming aircraft and used between the wars on flying boats. It fired a 1 1/2 lb (0.68 kg) High Explosive shell at modest velocity, but could be expected to be highly effective in its new role against landing aircraft, airborne troops or light vehicles. Fifty-five Mk III Armadillos were made. The crew comprised two drivers and three gunners.

In April 1942, a small number of Mk IIIs had their shingle protection replaced with "plastic armour" - a mixture of bitumen (or pitch) and granite or similar stone chippings.

== Service history ==
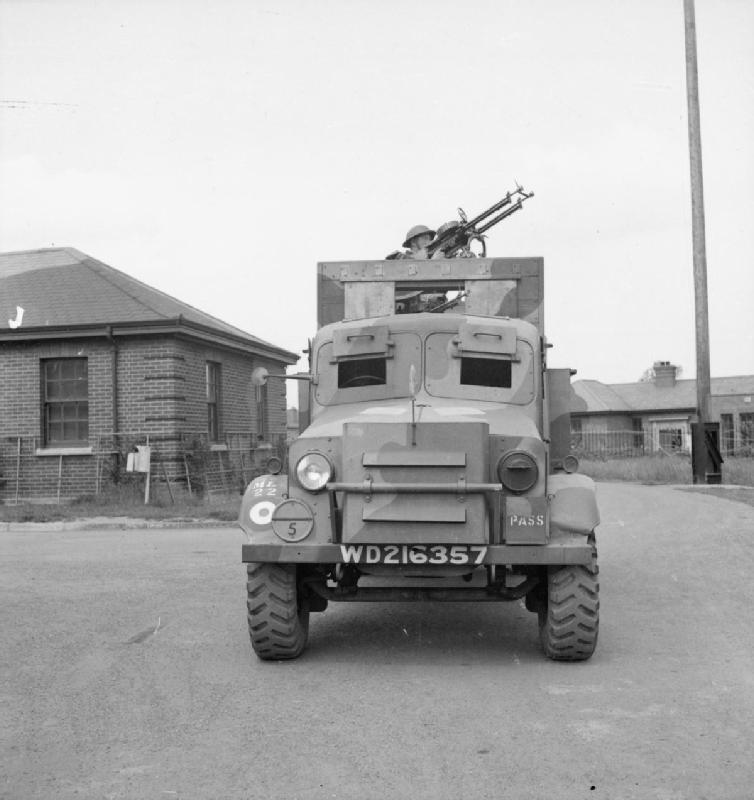
An Armadillo truck (with twin Lewis guns) conducting airfield defence at Mildenhall, Suffolk.

It did not matter that the vehicle was lightly armoured, because the soldiers it was expected to meet would be lightly equipped. What was of key importance was that the vehicle would survive the bombardment that was expected to immediately precede a landing. Armadillos were to be kept a short distance from the airfield, well hidden and protected but always ready to be called into action. Overweight, the Armadillo was unsuitable for travelling over rough or boggy ground. However, it did not need to travel far or fast, nor did it need to cope with hills; it could easily move along airfield taxiways and perimeter roads.

It was thought that commanders might be tempted to think of the Armadillo as a mobile pillbox rather than any sort of tank or armoured car. To counter such a view, instructions emphasised its use as a mobile unit, not a static fort and it was to be reserved for the defence of the airfield and not given other tasks such as transporting ammunition or being driven off to find parachutists.

The Armadillo was withdrawn in mid-1942, by which time 877 vehicles had been produced. The surviving vehicles were refurbished for other uses (some passing to the Home Guard), and Humber Light Reconnaissance Cars took over their role.

== See also ==
- Bedford OXA
- Bison concrete armoured lorry
- Standard Beaverette
- British anti-invasion preparations of World War II
