= Bedford OXA =

British improvised armoured car

Bedford OXA Lorry, 30cwt, Anti-Tank
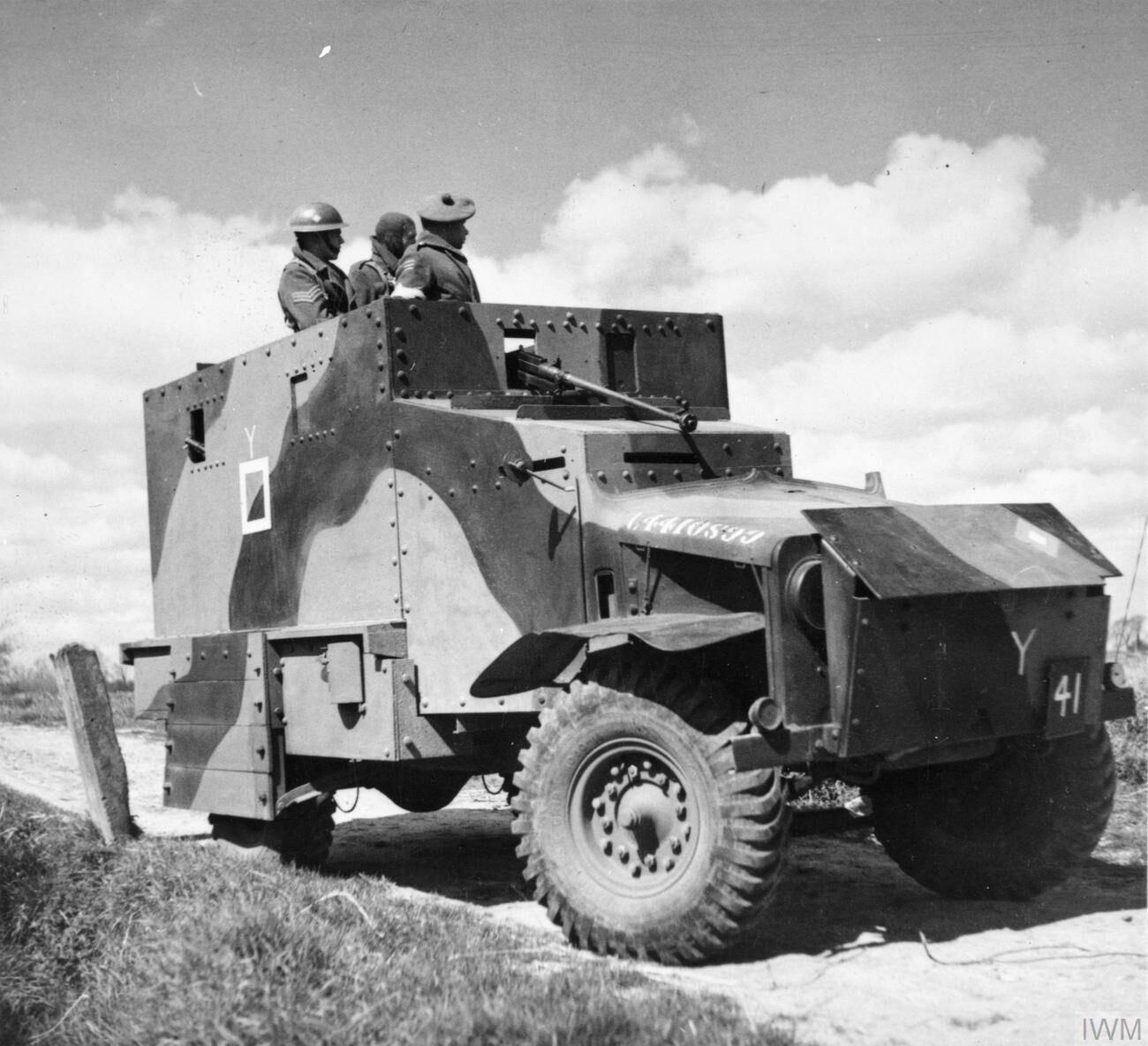
- In England on home defence.
- Type: Improvised Armoured car
- Place of origin: United Kingdom

Service history
- In service: 1940-1942

Production history
- Manufacturer: Bedford Vehicles, Luton
- Produced: 1940-1941
- No. built: 948

Specifications
- Mass: 6.5 t (6.4 long tons)
- Length: 4.68 m (15 ft 4 in)
- Width: 1.63 m (5 ft 4 in)
- Height: 2.14 m (7 ft 0 in)
- Crew: 8
- Armour: up to 9 mm
- Main armament: 0.55 in Boys anti-tank rifle
- Secondary armament: 0.303 in (7.7 mm) Bren light machine gun
- Engine: Bedford 6-cylinder petrol engine 72 hp (54 kW)
- Power/weight: 11.1 hp/tonne
- Suspension: 4x2 wheel, leaf spring
- Operational range: 300 mi (480 km)
- Maximum speed: 40 mph (64 km/h)

The Bedford OXA was a British heavy improvised armoured car, produced during the Second World War.

== Development ==
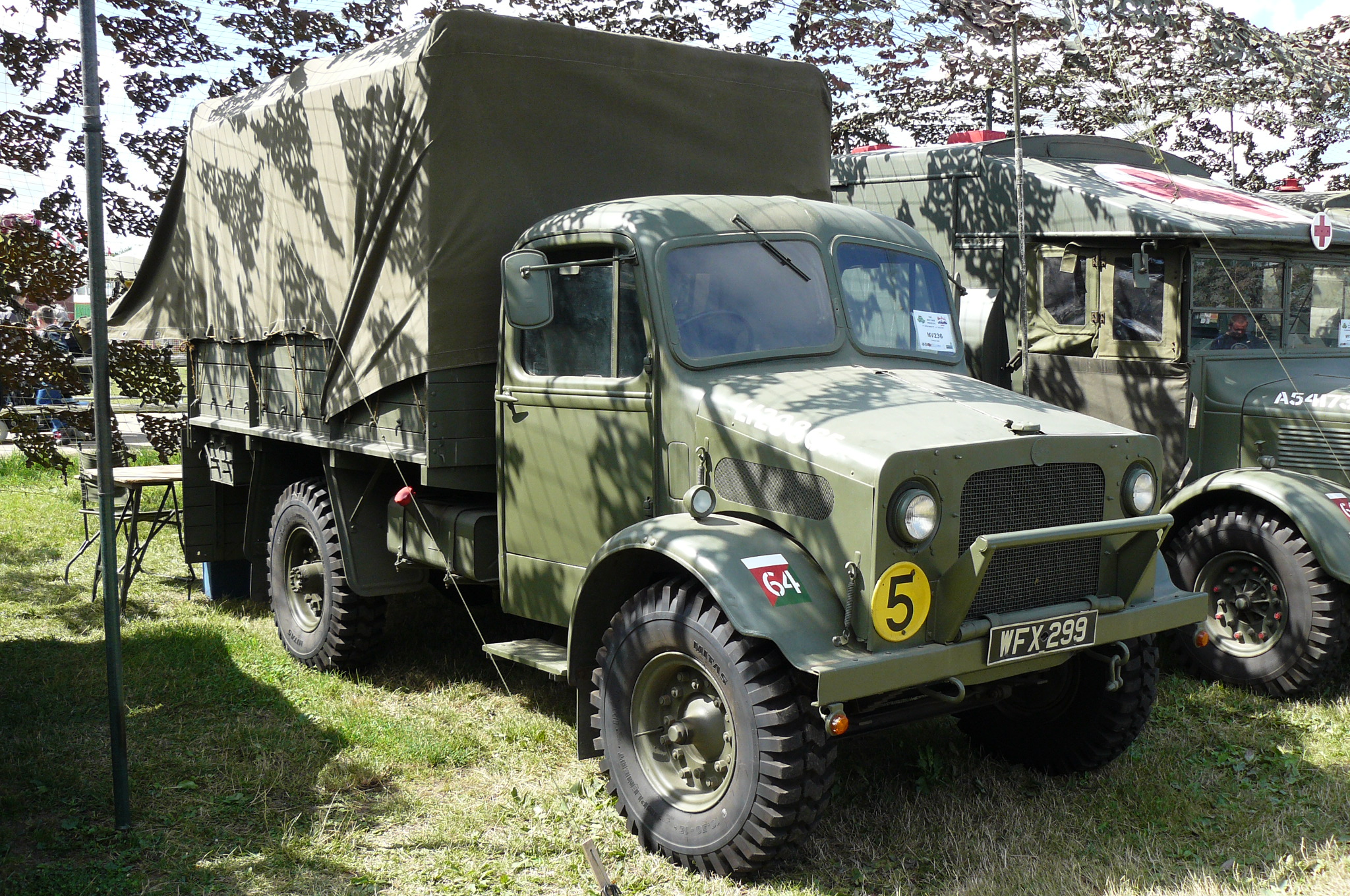
Bedford OXD truck, on which the OXA was based

It was developed by mounting an armoured body onto a Bedford OXD 30cwt (1.5 ton) truck chassis, armed with a Boys anti-tank rifle.

Its official designation was "Lorry 30cwt Anti-Tank". A total of 948 units were built in 1940–1941.

== Operational use ==
The vehicle was used by regular British Army units in 1940 and British Home Guard units until 1942.

== See also ==
- Armadillo armoured fighting vehicle
- Bison concrete armoured lorry
- Standard Beaverette
