= Queen Mary trailer =

Road trailer built to carry aircraft

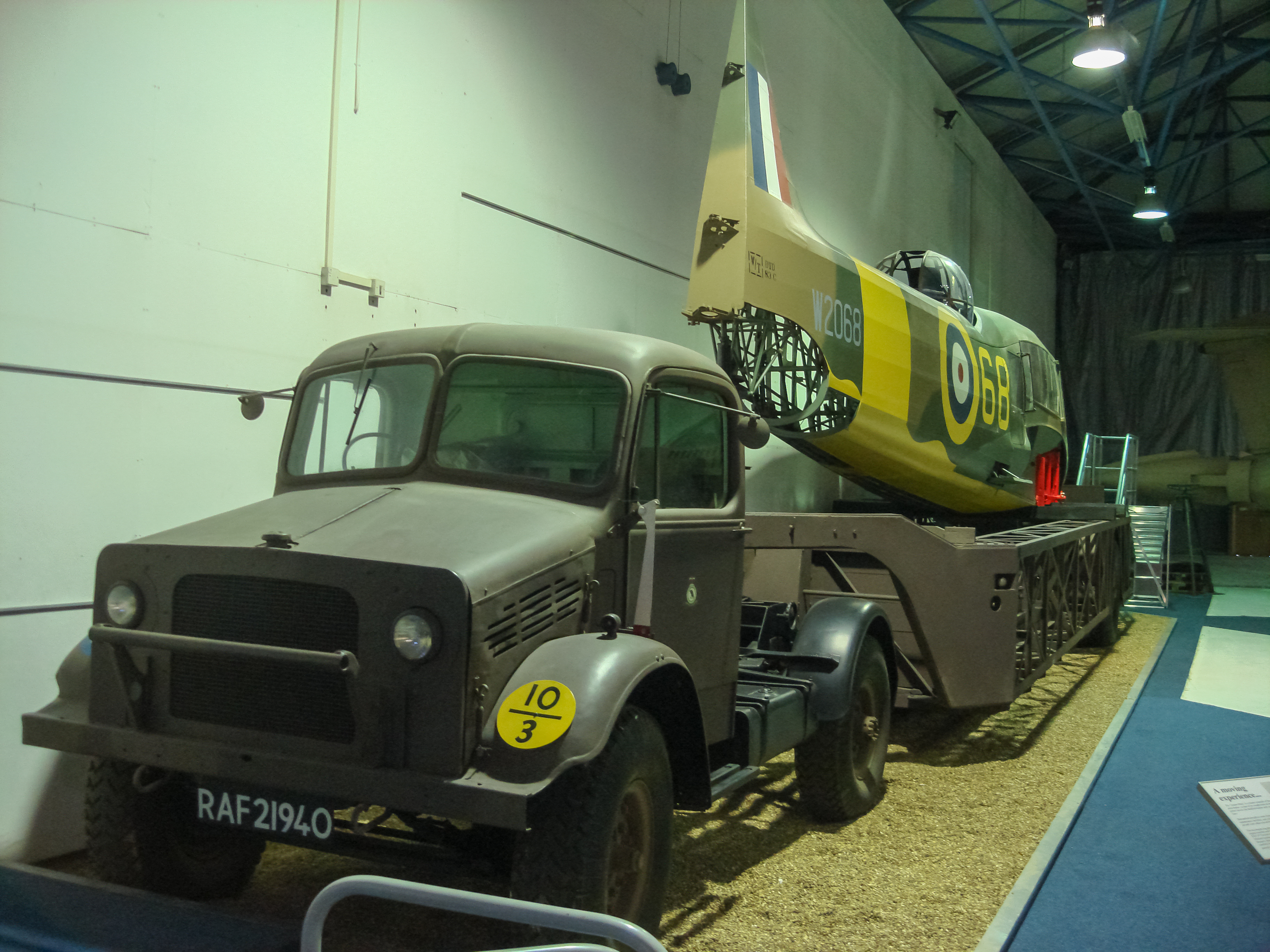
Bedford OXC and "Queen Mary" semi-trailer carrying part of an Avro Anson aircraft at the RAF Museum London

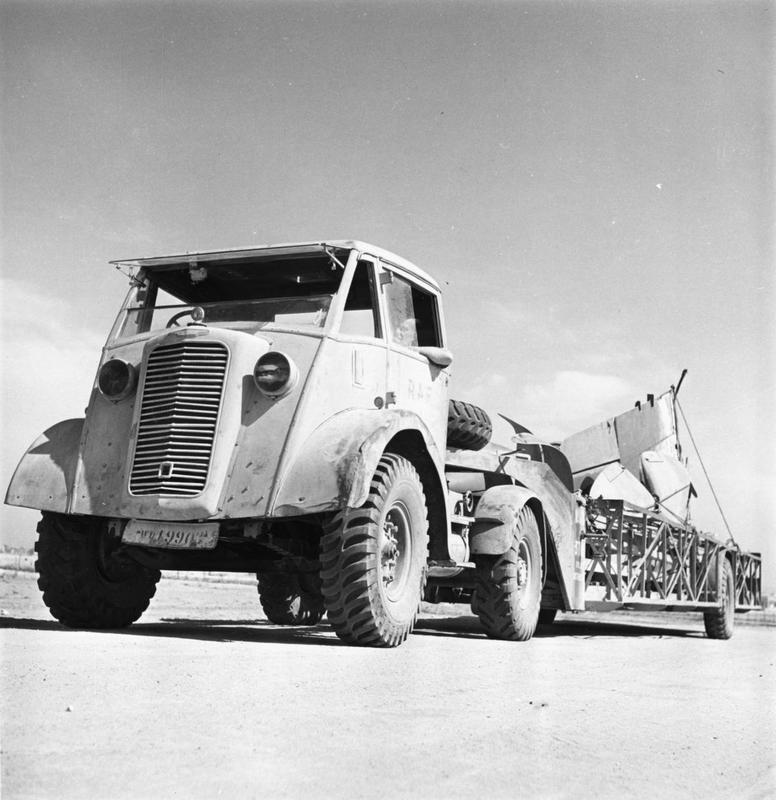
Commer Q2 and "Queen Mary" trailer

A Queen Mary trailer is a British semi-trailer combination designed for the carriage and recovery of aircraft. The trailer was made by Tasker Trailers of Andover, with Bedford, Commer Q2 or Crossley Motors tractors.

== Description ==
Features included:

- Very low floor and ground clearance, typically around 12 inches (300 mm).
- Single axle.
- Wheels outboard of load area.
- Side rails to allow carriage of wings upright, resting on their leading edges.

Load was 5 tons "distributed evenly".

These features were a natural result of the intended load, aircraft being typically light but long. The name is presumed to derive from its length, a reference to the ocean liner RMS Queen Mary.

== Use ==
Nearly four thousand of these vehicles were used by the Royal Air Force and Royal Navy Fleet Air Arm during and after World War II. It also saw service with the air forces of commonwealth air forces, including New Zealand.

Post-war civilian operators included Silver City Airways.

== Notes and references ==
- Reference to delivery on Queen Mary Trailer, RAF Museum, Hendon
- Crossley vehicles collection
