= Piłsudski's Tank =

Polish improvised armored car

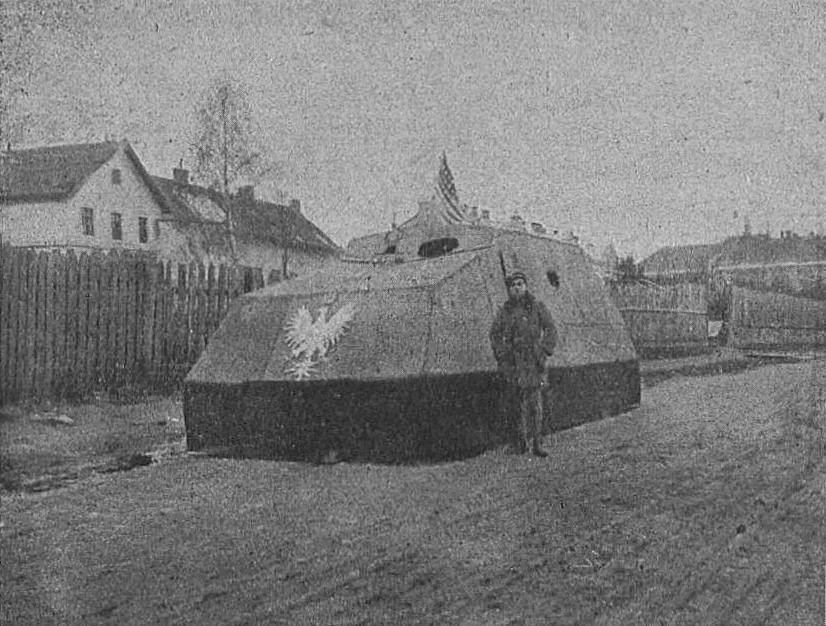
Piłsudski's Tank improvised armored car, 1919.

Piłsudski's Tank (Polish: Tank Piłsudskiego), also known as Józef Piłsudski, was an improvised armored car used by Polish military during the Polish-Ukrainian war. It was created on the basis of an unknown brand of truck.

== History ==
After Battle of Lviv (1918–1919) in Lviv, the idea of building an armored car was born that would support the assault of infantry on buildings occupied by the enemy.

Second Lieutenant Edward Sas-Świstelnicki received from Capt. Tadeusz Kudelski an order to organize construction, while the vehicle design was developed by prof. Antoni Markowski. The construction of the vehicle in the Railway Workshops lasted several days to November 7.

The vehicle started fighting on November 9, 1918, when it supported the attack of Lt Kazimierz Schleyen's unit through the Jesuit Garden. In addition to the commander, the other crew were: Eugeniusz Bernacki and Władysław Kubala (drivers) and Mieczysław Kretowicz, Edward Kustanowicz, Bronisław Nizioł and Stefan Zambelli (machine gunner sights). The vehicle's attack was stopped by the obstacle set, and then the vehicle was heavily fired at. To make matters worse, three of the four machine guns that were arming the vehicle were jammed. The vehicle was therefore withdrawn.

Following a collision with a tree after only several days of service, the vehicle's participation in combat was limited. At the end of the struggle, on November 22, the tank was directed to the Lychakivka turnpike to protect it, and then to Plac Krakowski.

The fate of the vehicle after the war is unknown.

== Reconstruction ==
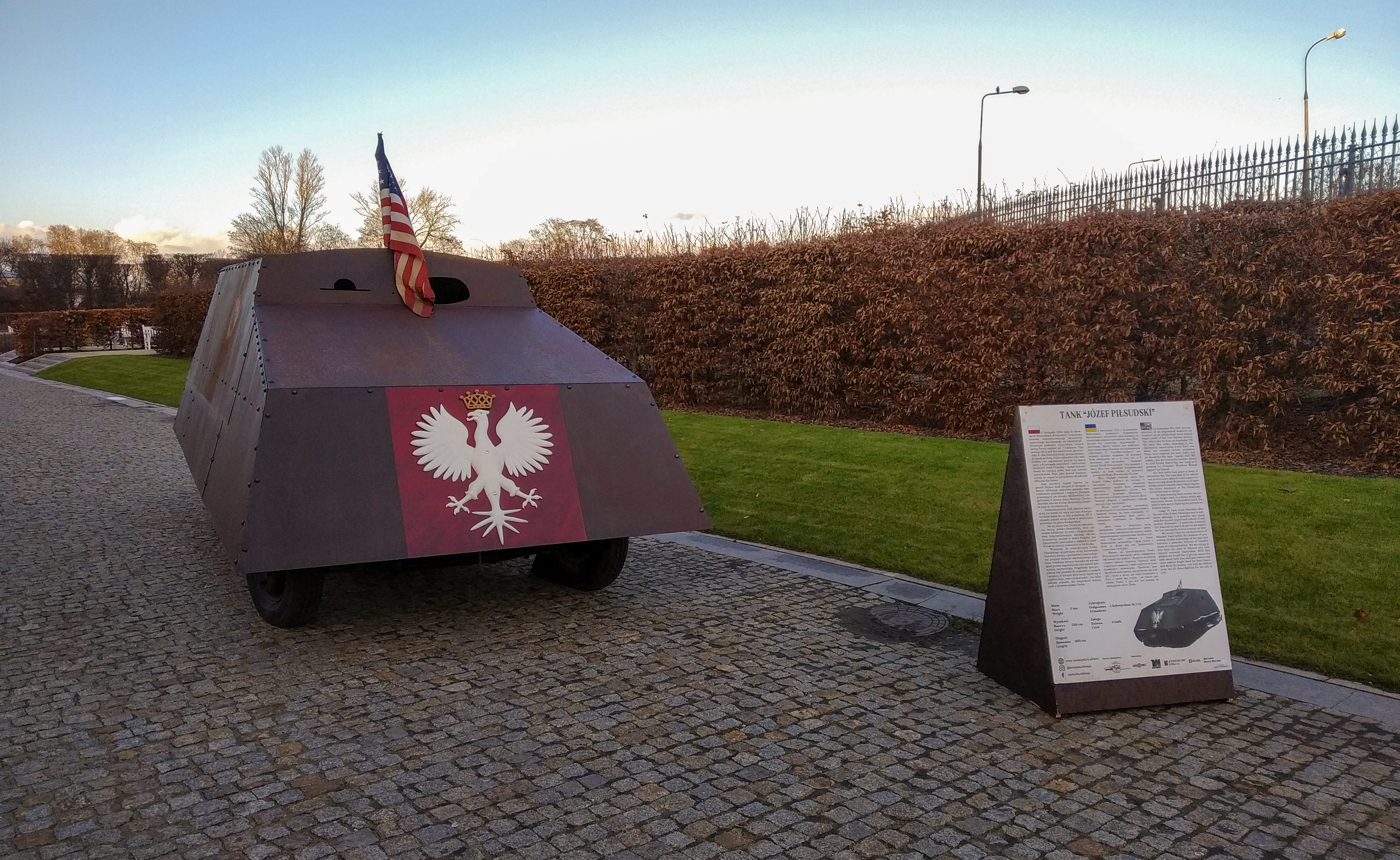
Reconstruction

In 2018, the Railway Acceptance Foundation undertook to build a replica of the vehicle. Due to the lack of documentation, the dimensions were calculated according to the Lviv tenement house visible on one of the photographs, which has survived to modern times, serving as a scale.

The proper armor was made of a few millimeter sheet metal, the so-called mesh protecting the vehicle from below called a "Ledóchowski grid".

The replica of the vehicle was presented to the public for the first time at the celebration of the centenary of regaining independence, November 11, 2018.
