= Improvised fighting vehicle =

Civilian vehicle modified for combat

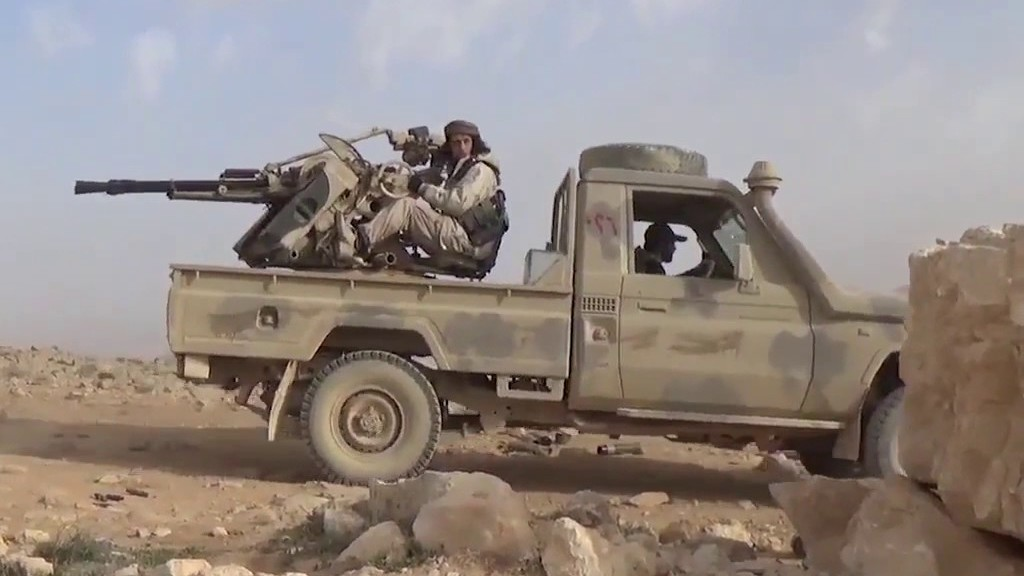
A Toyota Land Cruiser technical armed with a ZPU-2 anti-aircraft gun operated by the Free Syrian Army during battles against Islamic State in the eastern Qalamoun Mountains, southern Syria, 2017

An improvised fighting vehicle is an ad hoc combat vehicle resulting from modified or upgraded civilian or military non-combat vehicle, often constructed and employed by civilian insurgents, terrorists, rebels, mobsters, guerrillas, partisans, drug cartels, criminal organizations or other forms of non-state militias and irregular armies. Such modifications usually consist of grafting improvised armour plating and fixed crew-served weapons such as heavy machine guns or antiaircraft autocannons mounted onto the back of a utility vehicle or pickup truck.

Various militias and official militaries have improvised such vehicles ever since the introduction of the first automobiles into military service. During the 1910s and 1920s, the absence of a doctrine for the military use of automobiles or of an industry dedicated to producing them led to a great deal of improvisation in the creation of early armored cars and similar vehicles.

In the 1930s and 1940s, despite the advent of arms industries producing armored fighting vehicles in many countries, several armies still resorted to using ad hoc contraptions, often in response to unexpected military situations, or as a result of the development of new tactics for which no available vehicle was suitable.

The construction of improvised fighting vehicles may also reflect a lack of means for the force that uses them. This is especially true in developing countries, where various armies and guerrilla forces have used them (e.g. during the Toyota War), as they are more affordable and accessible than military-grade combat vehicles.

== Early use ==
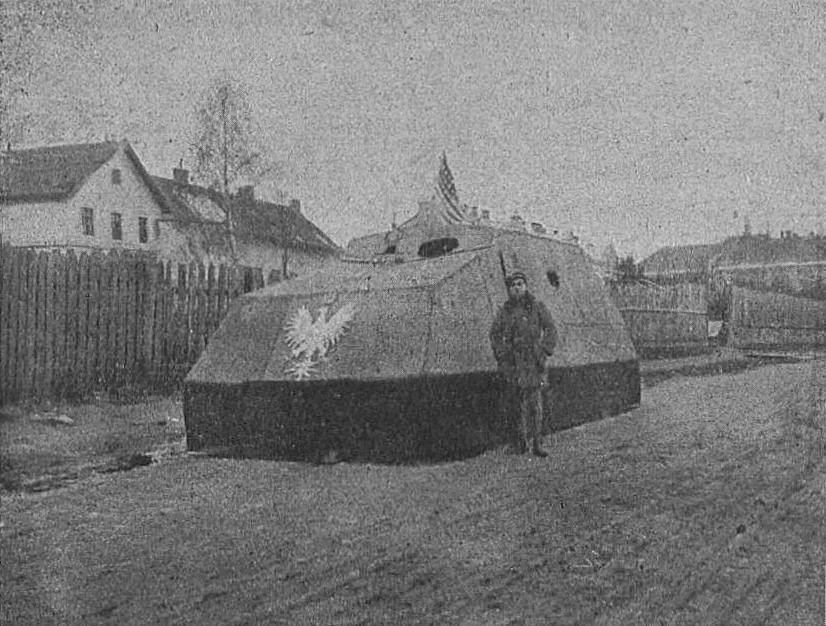
Piłsudski's Tank improvised armoured car in 1919.

=== Daimler-Guinness Armoured Lorries ===
An early improvised fighting vehicle was constructed for the British Army in Dublin during the Easter Rising in 1916. It was made from a three-ton Daimler truck commandeered from the Dublin Guinness brewery. An armoured body was mounted on the truck, built from the smokeboxes of several steam locomotives. The body had loopholes cut in it for riflemen to fire through and was painted with black spots that acted as dummy loopholes to confuse snipers. A steel box protected the truck driver and steel plating covered the truck radiator. Construction took less than one day at the Great Southern Railways workshop. After the rising, the locomotive parts were returned to the railway and the truck returned to its owners.

=== Piłsudski's Tank ===
Piłsudski's Tank was an improvised armoured car used by the Polish military during the Polish-Ukrainian War. It was created on the basis of a truck of unknown brand.

== World War II ==
=== SAS jeeps ===
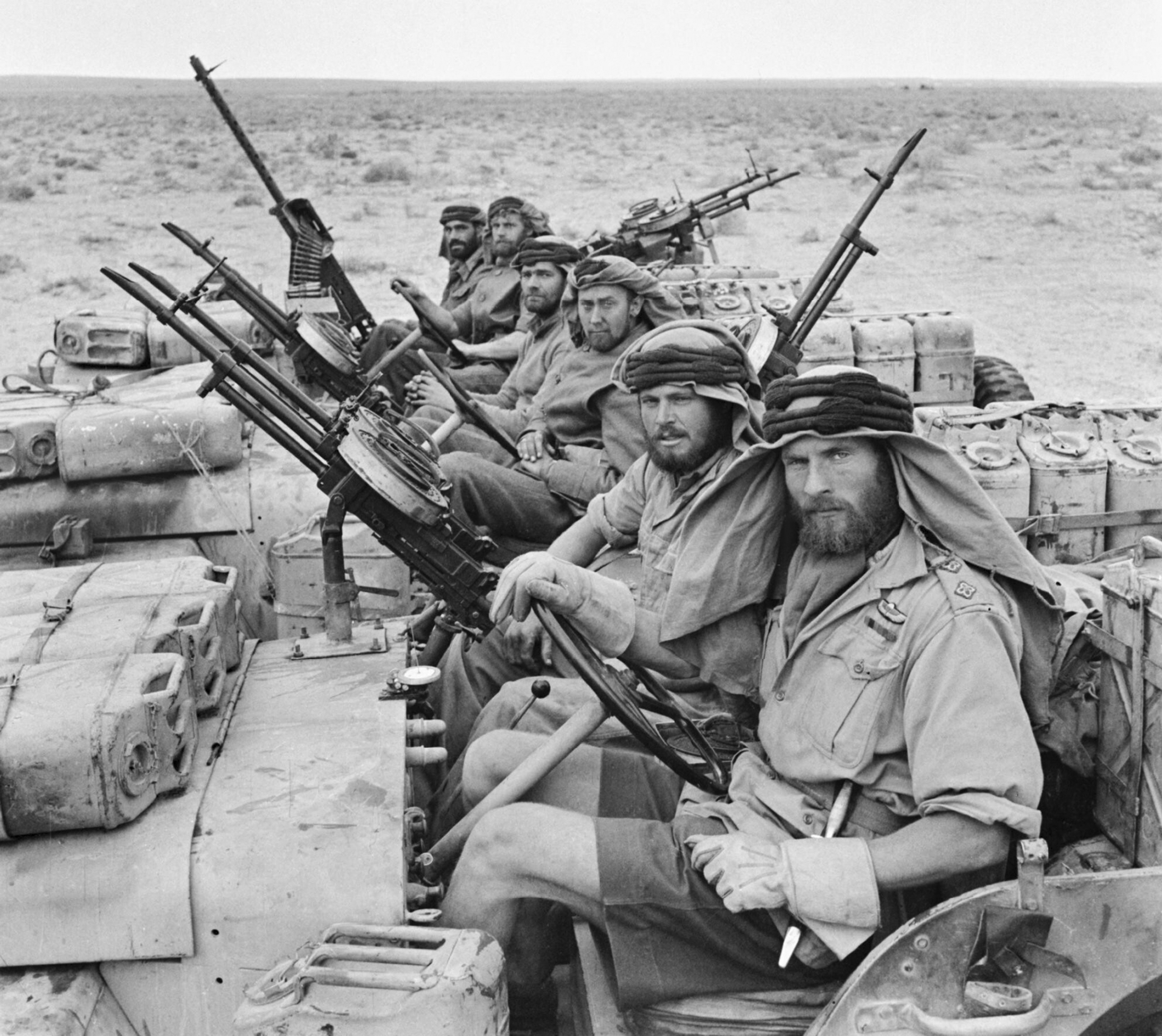
'L' Detachment SAS in their armed jeeps

Created during the North African Campaign of World War II, the Special Air Service specialised in carrying out hit-and-run attacks, in particular against Axis airfields. As no vehicle was adapted to this kind of mission, the SAS were forced to build their own. Heavily modified Lend-Lease jeeps became the trademark weapon of the SAS. The windscreens, and sometimes the bumper were removed, in order to save weight and permit an extra payload to be carried. The radiator grille bars were often removed to allow more airflow to better cool the engine in the hot desert climate. Different weapons arrays were carried, including different combinations of various Browning and Vickers K machine guns according to available supply.

The SAS jeeps were used during the whole North African Campaign, and later in Europe, where they were used for sabotage missions behind enemy lines.

=== British home guard ===
The Home Guard, an armed citizen militia of the British Army as a form of invasion defense, was often inadequately equipped throughout its existence, as the more valuable and modern equipment were issued to the regular British Army. As such, the Home Guard was often outfitted with obsolete or makeshift weapons and vehicles of dubious effectiveness. Among the improvised fighting vehicle developed for use by the Home Guard include the Armadillo, the Bison, the OXA, and the Standard Beaverette.

=== Soviet tractor tanks ===
An improvised Soviet armoured fighting vehicle, based on an STZ-5 agricultural tractor, manufactured in Odessa during the early stages of World War II. The NI tank's name is an abbreviation of "Na Ispug" (Russian: На Испуг), which literally translates to "for fear". It was also called the "Odessa tank" and "terror tank". Another type of vehicle was KhTZ-16 (named after the Kharkiv Tractor Factory) based on the chassis of an STZ-3 tractor.

=== Kubuś ===
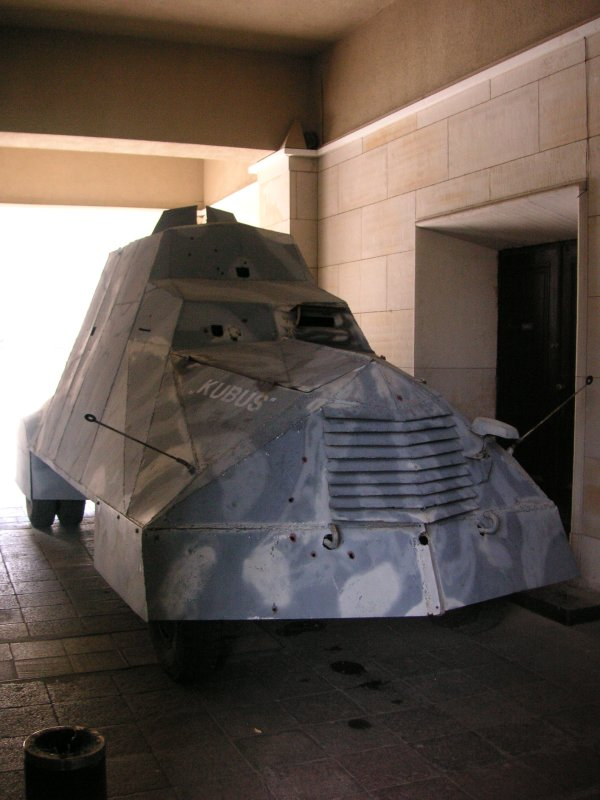
The original Kubuś car at the Polish Army Museum

An improvised armoured car built on a Chevrolet 157 truck chassis by the Polish resistance Home Army in 1944.

== Modern times ==
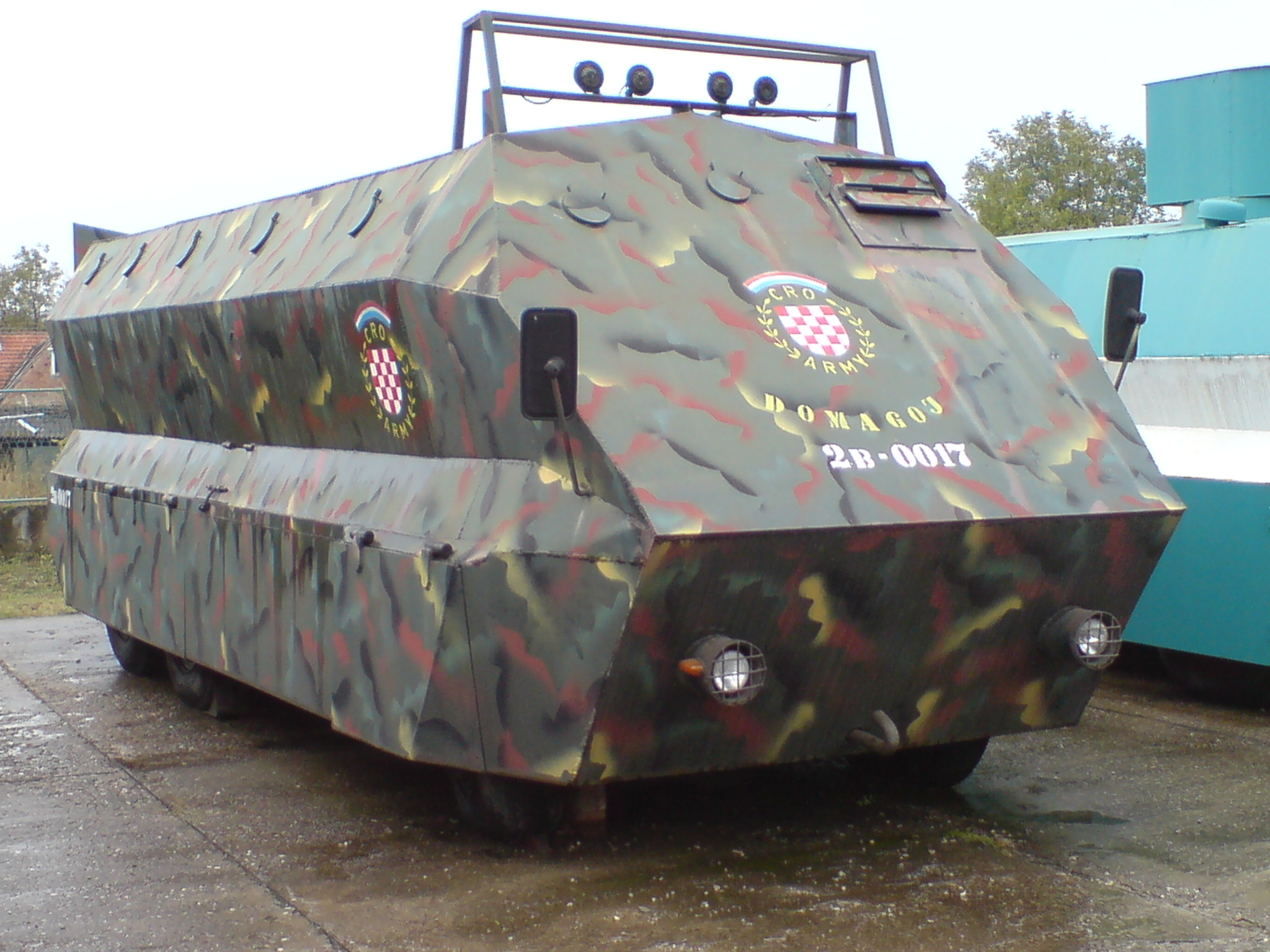
A Croatian improvised infantry fighting vehicle during the Croatian War of Independence 1991–1995.

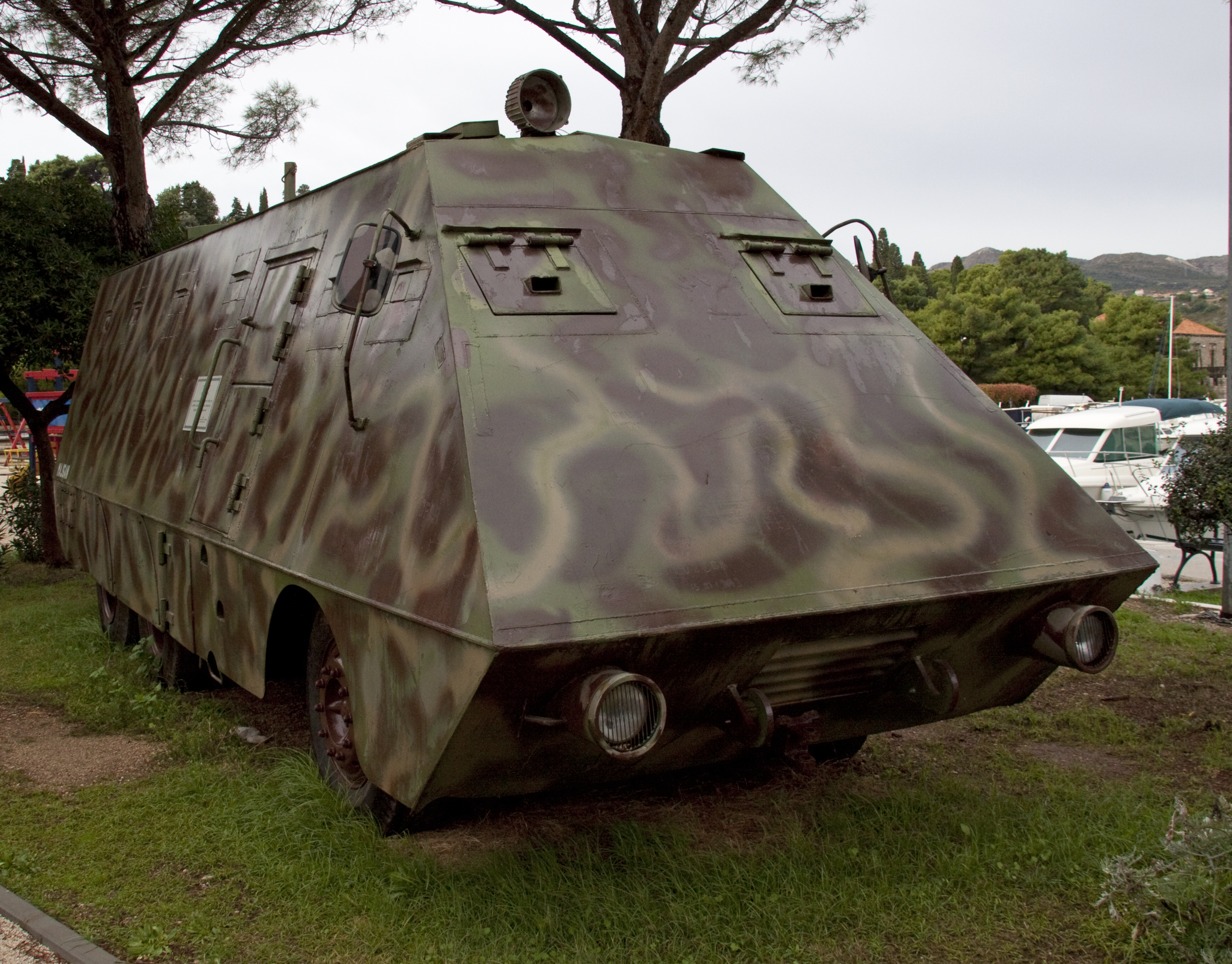
Improvised fighting vehicle from the Croatian War of Independence.

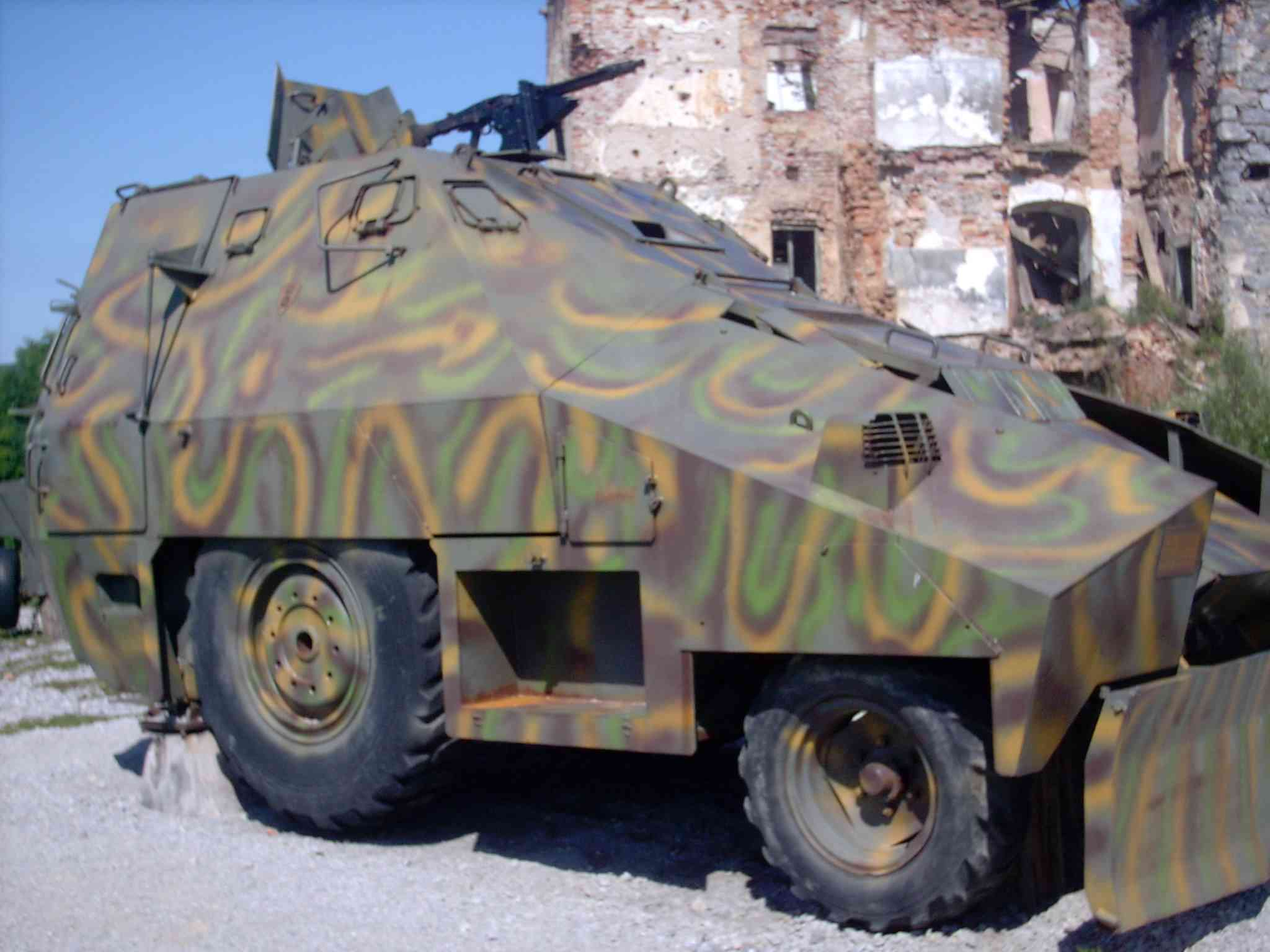
Croatian improvised armored backhoe with a 70 hp engine. The turntable was equipped with a 20 mm anti-aircraft cannon, a 12.7 mm Browning heavy machine gun or an 82 mm cannon from the Croatian War of Independence. Currently equipped with a German MG 42 light machine gun.

=== Technicals ===
Typically a civilian or military non-combat vehicle, modified to provide an offensive capability. It is usually an open-backed civilian pickup truck or 4x4 on which is mounted a machine gun, a light anti-aircraft gun, recoilless rifle, rotary cannon, anti-tank weapon, anti-tank gun, anti-tank guided missile, mortar, multiple rocket launcher, rocket pods salvaged from downed attack helicopters or other relatively small weapons system along with optional add-ons like improvised vehicle armour.

The term "technical" used to describe such a vehicle appears to have originated in Somalia. The name is thought to have derived from use by the Red Cross there who were often forced to bribe local militias or be the victim of robbery and attacks. The money used for the bribe was then written off as "technical expenses". They are also known as battlewagons and gunwagons.

Among irregular armies, often centered around the perceived strength and charisma of warlords, the prestige power of technicals is strong. According to one article, "The Technical is the most significant symbol of power in southern Somalia. It is a small truck with large tripod machine guns mounted on the back. A warlord's power is measured by how many of these vehicles he has."

=== Gun trucks ===
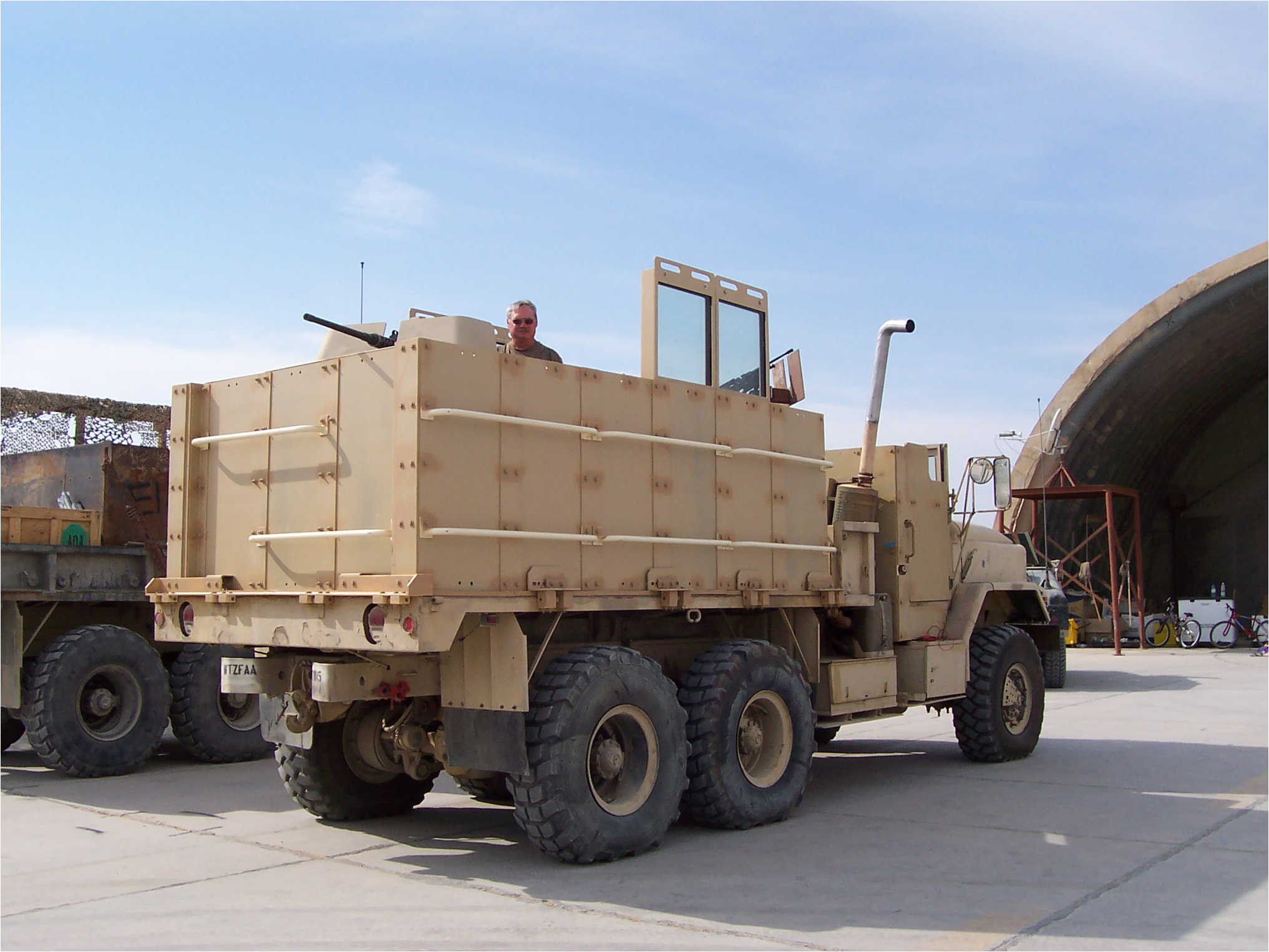
A gun truck of the type used in Iraq, based on an M939 five-ton truck

An improvised military armoured vehicle used by units of regular armies or other official government armed forces, based on a conventional military transport truck, that is able to carry a large weight of weapons and armor. They have poor off-road performance, so have mainly been used by regular armies to escort military convoys in regions subject to ambush by guerrilla forces.

=== Narco tanks ===
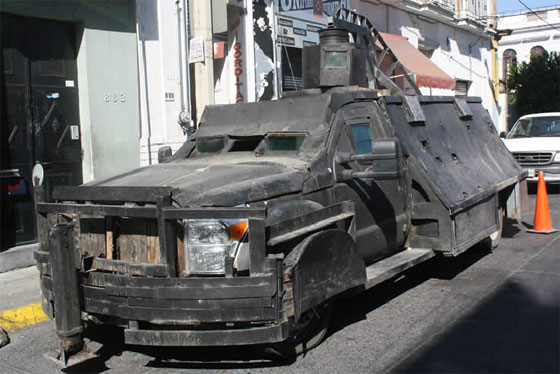
Ford F-350 "Monstruo 2010" featuring a turret, captured by Mexican authorities in Jalisco, 2011.

Narco tanks, also known as rhino trucks or monstruos are a type of improvised fighting vehicle used by drug cartels. They are typically civilian pickup trucks, dump trucks, semi-trucks or other large vehicles fitted with armaments, improvised vehicle armour and firing ports. Some narco tanks are even fitted with improvised battering rams to break through roadblocks. These additions improve operational mobility, and both offensive and defensive capabilities to fight law enforcement and rivals during drug trafficking.

=== ISIS and YPG armored vehicles ===
Multiple examples of improvised fighting vehicles have been created from multiple factions in the Syrian Civil war and the War In Iraq.

Armament and thickness of armor varies on different examples, along with the chassis they are designed on. They are used as SVBIED's, armored cars, improvised tanks, and improvised armored personnel carriers.

=== Ukrainian and Russian improvised armoured vehicles ===
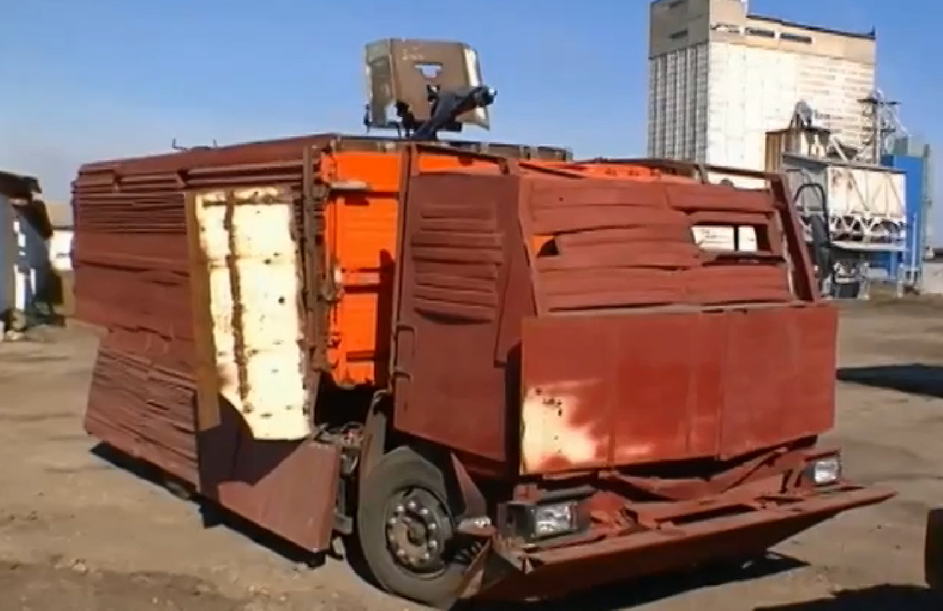
Ukrainian armed truck in 2014; with improvised vehicle armour under use as an improvised APC in the Russo-Ukrainian War.

Throughout both the 2014 War in Donbas and the 2022 Russian Invasion of Ukraine, both sides used improvised fighting vehicles for purposes such as hit-and-run attacks or anti-drone defenses. Ukrainian forces reportedly used rocket launchers recovered from downed helicopters, mounted on technicals.

== See also ==
- Anti-drone cage
- Armoured warfare
- Gun truck
- Killdozer
- Technical (vehicle)
- Narco tank
- Narco-submarine
