= Bison Mobile Pillbox =

British improvised fighting vehicle

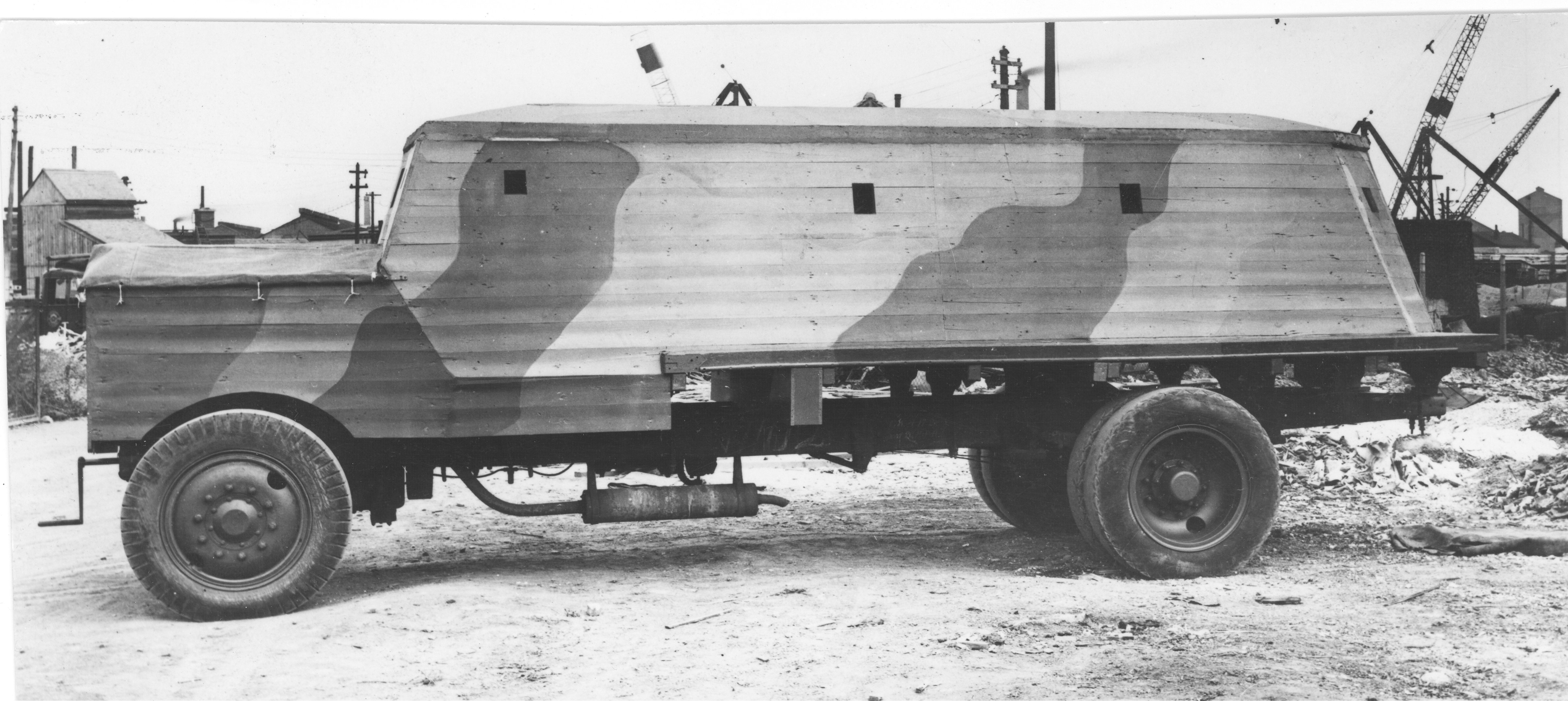
- Type 3 Bison
- Type: Improvised armoured truck (Mobile pillbox)
- Place of origin: United Kingdom

Service history
- Used by: Home Guard
- Wars: World War II

The Bison Mobile Pillbox was an improvised armoured truck frequently characterised as a mobile pillbox. Bisons were produced in Britain during the invasion crisis of 1940-1941. Based on a number of different lorry chassis, it featured a fighting compartment protected by a layer of concrete. Bisons were used by the Royal Air Force (RAF) to protect aerodromes and by the Home Guard. They acquired the generic name "Bison" from their main manufacturer.

== Need ==
With the Fall of France in July 1940, the British Government made efforts to prepare for the threatened invasion. One problem was the defence of airfields against airborne troops.

An ideal solution for protecting the open space of an airfield was to use tanks and armoured cars. However, the British Army lacked heavy equipment having abandoned much of it during the evacuation of Dunkirk. An alternative was needed which would not compete for resources with conventional armaments.

== Inception ==
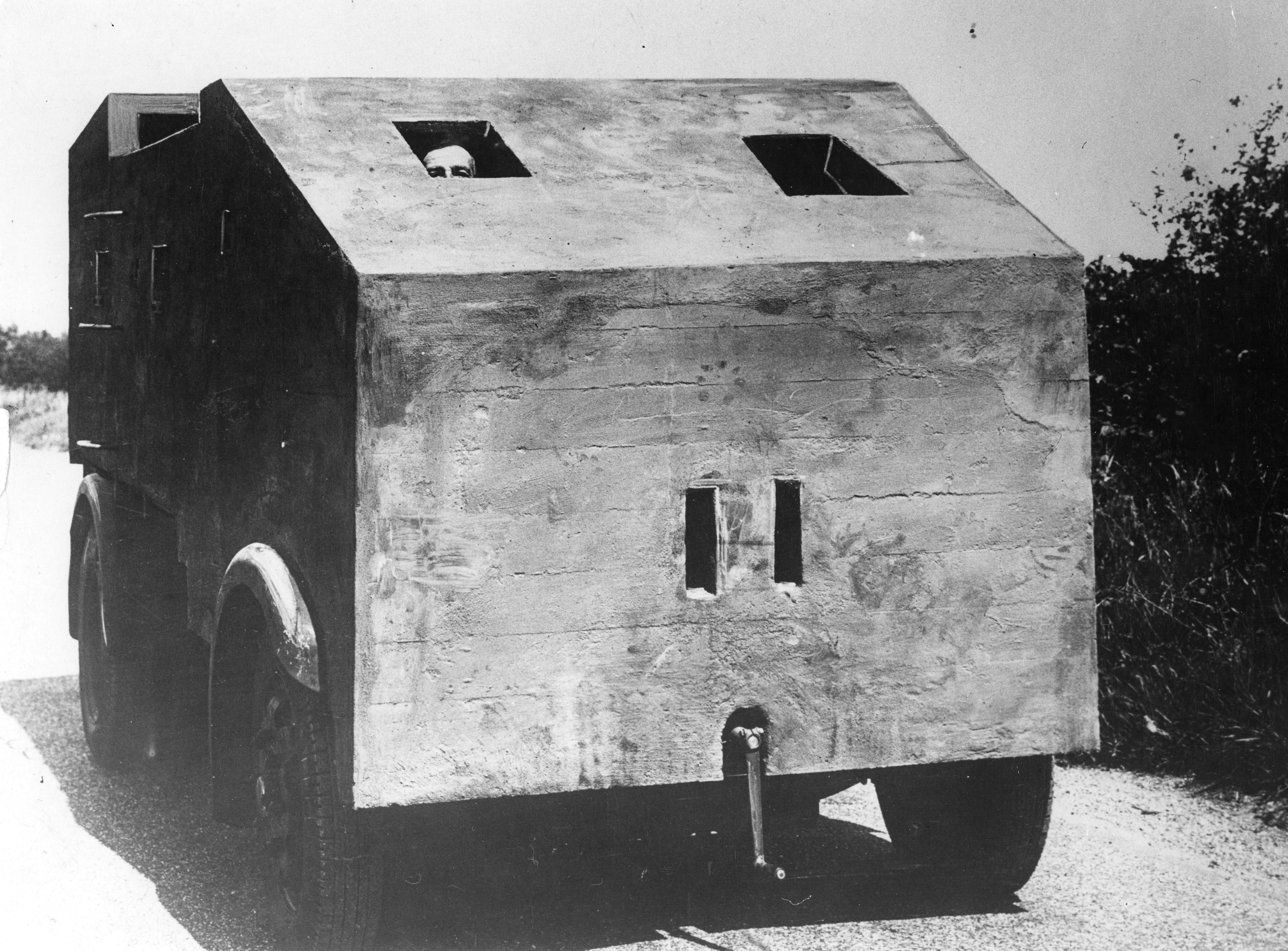
Short wheelbase Bison

The Bison was the invention of Charles Bernard Mathews (Note: The spelling of Mathews name varies in sources, but a single t is most likely correct.) who was a director of Concrete Limited. At this time, there were many attempts to improvise armoured vehicles, but Mathews had the resources and experience to take a professional approach.

Mathews and his commercial partner John Goldwell Ambrose had been in the Royal Engineers and had a history of wartime innovation with concrete including pre-cast pillboxes and dugouts during the First World War. One of Mathews' more unusual ideas, with which he experimented in early 1939, was to stack piles of football-sized concrete spheres on top of air-raid shelters, with the intention that a bomb would expend its energy in scattering aside the heavy spheres rather than breaking the shelter.

Mathews bought twenty-four old lorry chassis on which to base the vehicles and he made up a prototype to show to local military authorities. Helpful criticism was forthcoming and Mathews was able to produce a version which met the requirements of the army. The vehicles were essentially mobile pillboxes. Mathews said: "[mobile] Concrete pill-boxes will never take the place of armoured cars and tanks, but the enemy would find them a serious obstacle. Their great attraction is that anybody can make them – once he knows how".

Mathews' company trademark then (and the company name today) was a Bison, a name which became a generic label for any of these vehicles.

Concrete Limited obtained chassis where they could. Many were old and some dated from the First World War period, one had even seen service as a fire engine and some had not even been converted from solid to pneumatic tyres. With a variety of chassis to work on, Bisons inevitably varied in detail, but were made in three distinct types:

- Type 1 was the lightest. It had a fully armoured cab and a small armoured fighting compartment roofed with canvas.
- Type 2 had an armoured cab roofed with canvas and a separate fully enclosed fighting compartment resembling a small pillbox on the back – communication between driver and crew must have been difficult.
- Type 3 was the largest and heaviest. It had a contiguous cabin and fighting compartment completely enclosed in concrete armour.

== Production ==
Steel was a valuable wartime resource so concrete was favoured for armouring these pillbox vehicles. Any available lorry chassis was used, although the weight of the concrete meant that only the heaviest of chassis were suitable.

Lorries arrived at Concrete Limited's Stourton Works in Leeds, where the original metal bodywork was removed and wooden shuttering formers constructed. Within the formers, three sheets of expanded metal were placed as reinforcement and then fast setting, high strength concrete made with high alumina cement was poured in. Characteristic ridges at the gaps between the boards are a noticeable feature.

When a roof was provided, this was constructed from pre-cast concrete. The walls were about 6 inches (150 mm) thick and were found to stand up well to Bren gun and armour-piercing bullets.

It is not clear how many Bisons were produced; estimates vary between two and three hundred. Due to the resilience of concrete some traces of the Bison remain today whereas nothing at all is left of the more readily recycled Armadillo.

The existence of these mobile pillboxes received significant publicity at the time. They were briefly detailed in The Times and at greater length in Commercial Motor magazine.

== Role ==
These were emphatically not "armoured cars", but merely a pillbox that could be moved from place to place. It was claimed to travel "at normal lorry speed" but in practice it was mainly restricted to the flatness of airfields. Most had difficulty moving at all owing to their excess weight, poor visibility and reduced radiator cooling. Some broke down completely and were either towed, or abandoned in place. Those built on steam wagon chassis coped well with the extra weight once boilers were removed, but were no longer powered.

Despite concrete's poor performance as armour against heavy weapons, they would have been quite adequate to defend against the lightly armed German paratroops who were the anticipated attackers at airfields. Driven, or towed, to a defensive position they could cover the open space of an airfield where enemy paratroops or transport aeroplanes might attempt a landing. When the airfield was needed for friendly aircraft, a Bison could be moved out of the way so that they would not be a danger to aircraft movements.

== Extant examples ==
=== The Tank Museum ===
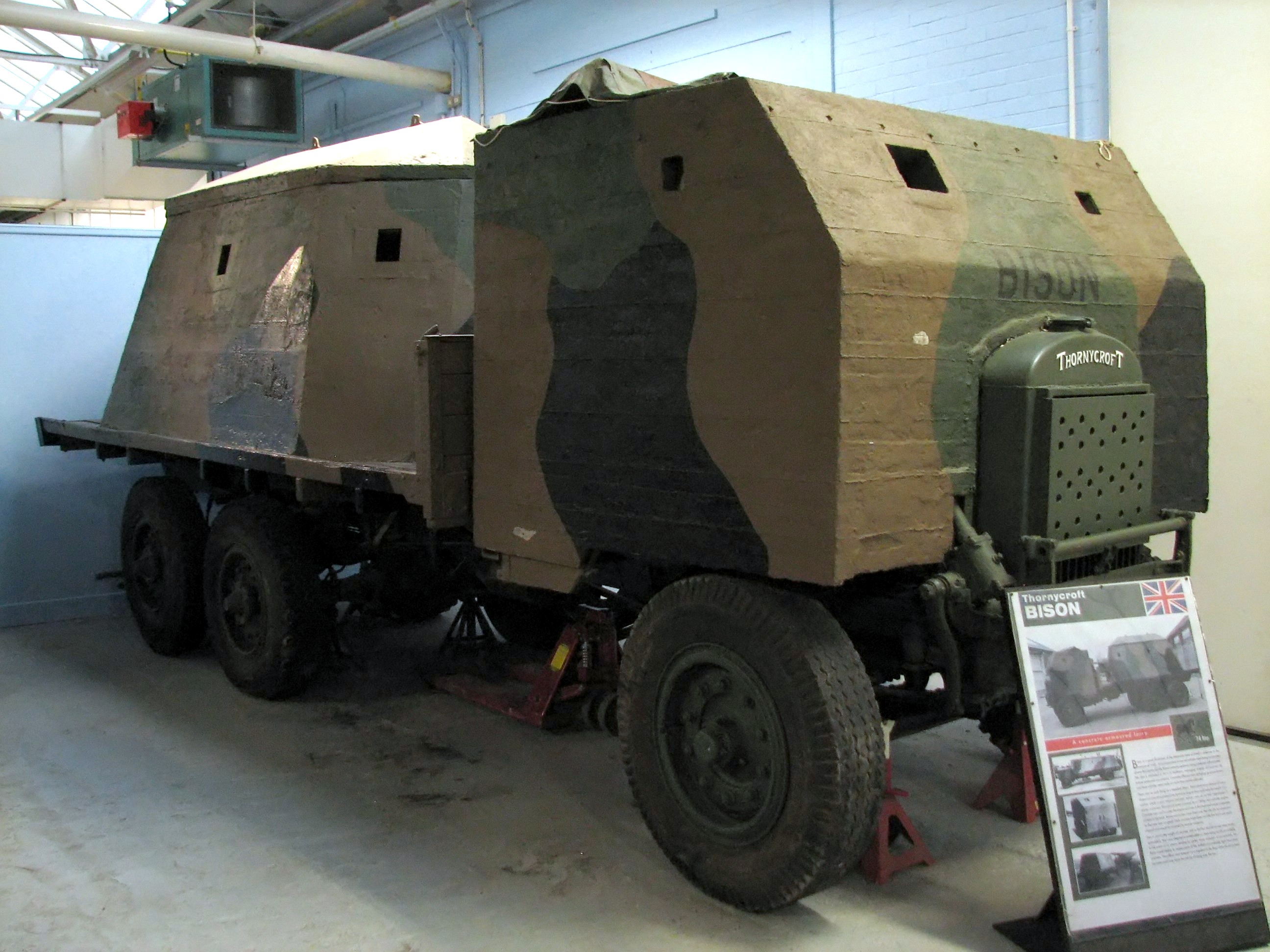
Thornycroft, type 2 Bison on display at The Tank Museum, Bovington

A complete type 2 Bison, reconstructed from extant parts and a period lorry chassis, can be seen at The Tank Museum, Bovington. This example is a Thornycroft Tartar 3 ton, 6×4 of 1931 or later. The chassis here was a military forward-control Tartar used as a 3-ton general service lorry; military Tartars had one wheel on each side of the rear axles, civilian models had twin wheels — two wheels on each side.

Access to the rear pillbox is through a hatch cut into the lorry decking. The cab armour is open-topped and was accessed by climbing over. Early examples used a single rectangular box over both sections, but separate sloping-walled boxes saved weight. Some examples were built with unarmoured cabs which emphasises their limited mobility – they had to be deployed before any attack. Although attempts were often made to protect the engine and vulnerable radiator, this one has merely a light steel plate over half the radiator and the steering box is still exposed.

In period it is unlikely that a relatively modern military lorry would have been sacrificed in this way, being too valuable to replace losses after Dunkirk. The museum's Bison was built relatively recently, from an original rear pillbox on a different original chassis, with the front cab section being a modern reproduction by the Museum of Army Transport in Beverley. The suspension of this example rests on axle stands to avoid flattening the tyres.

=== Lincolnshire Aviation Heritage Centre ===
This Bison had been used by the Home Guard to defend RAF Digby in Lincolnshire. Later in the war, Digby was downgraded and hence the additional airfield protection was not required. It was for a while stored at Ferrybridge, Yorkshire and it was used to defend a roadblock on the A15 just outside Sleaford. Towards the end of the war it was abandoned in a copse to the side of the A15 near Quarington Lane end. The ensuing years saw it stripped and vandalised until eventually the chassis was converted for use as a farm trailer. In 1988, the Lincolnshire Aircraft Recovery Group learned of the existence of these remains and research revealed what it really was.

On 22 March 1991 the remains of the Bison were taken to the Lincolnshire Aviation Heritage Centre; they still retain traces of camouflage paint, and one of the sections has its original wooden shuttering.

== See also ==
- Armadillo armoured fighting vehicle
- Bedford OXA
- Standard Beaverette
- British hardened field defences of World War II
