= Bedford OY =

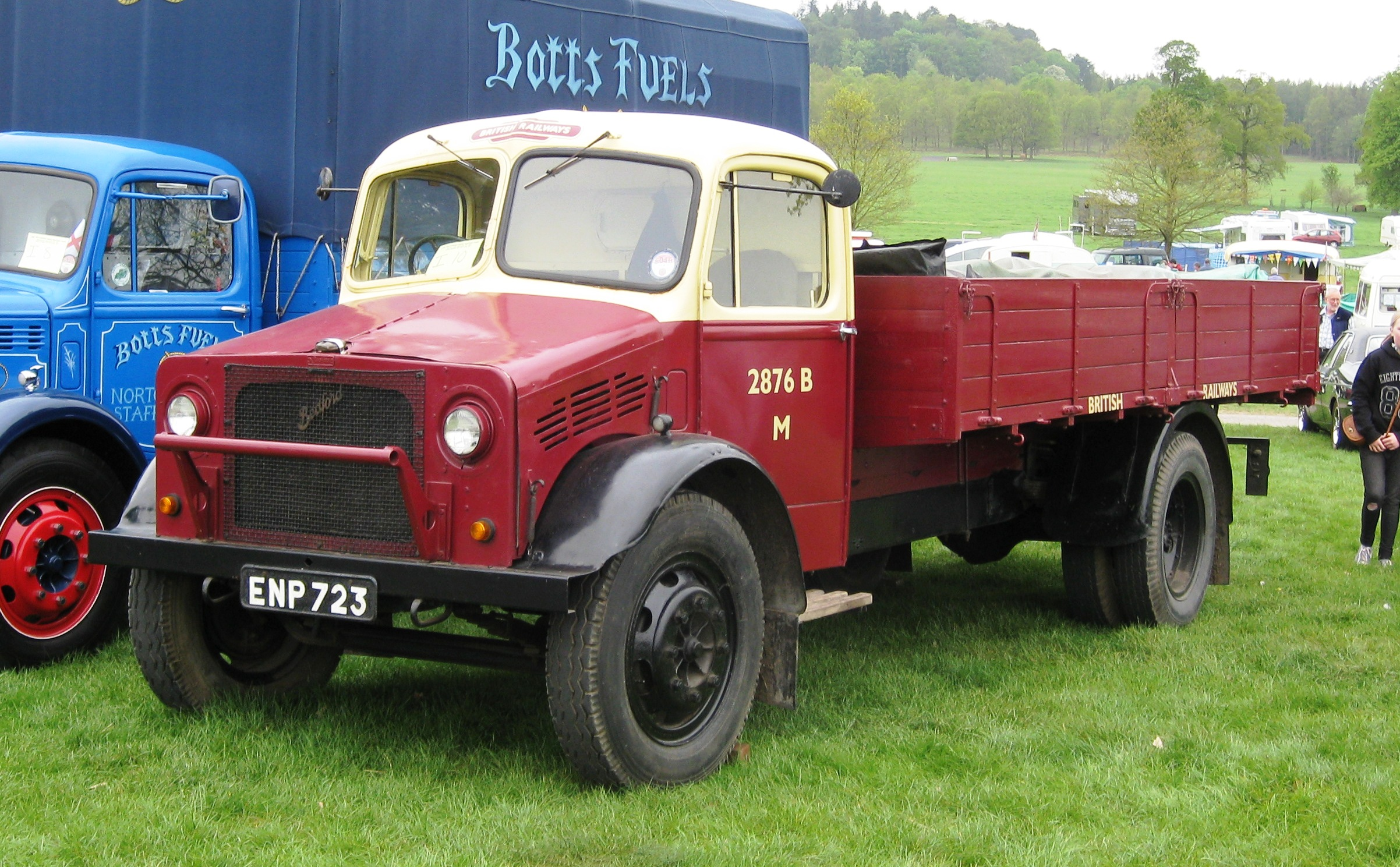

Overview
- Manufacturer: Bedford (General Motors)
- Production: 1939-1953; 72,385 (1940-1945)
- Assembly: Luton

Body and chassis
- Class: Military vehicle
- Body style: flatbed, tanker
- Layout: Longitudinal front engine, rear-wheel drive (2x4)

Powertrain
- Engine: 3.5 L 72 bhp I6 petrol
- Transmission: 4-speed manual

Dimensions
- Wheelbase: not known
- Length: 6.22 m (20 ft 5 in)
- Width: 2.18 m (7 ft 2 in)
- Height: 3.09 m (10 ft 2 in)
- Kerb weight: 6,568 kg (6.46 long tons)

Chronology
- Successor: Bedford TA

The Bedford OY is an army lorry (truck (Note: In the terminology a truck was a load carrier under 1 ton (20-cwt) payload and a lorry over 30-cwt (1.5 tons), anything that pulled or towed something was a "tractor")) built by Bedford for the British Armed Forces and introduced in 1939. It was based on Bedford's O-series commercial vehicles with a modified front end and single rear tyres. It was designed for a 3-ton payload. The OYD was a general service vehicle, while the OYC was a tanker version for carrying water or petrol. These vehicles were widely used during, and after, World War II but were later superseded by the Bedford RL.

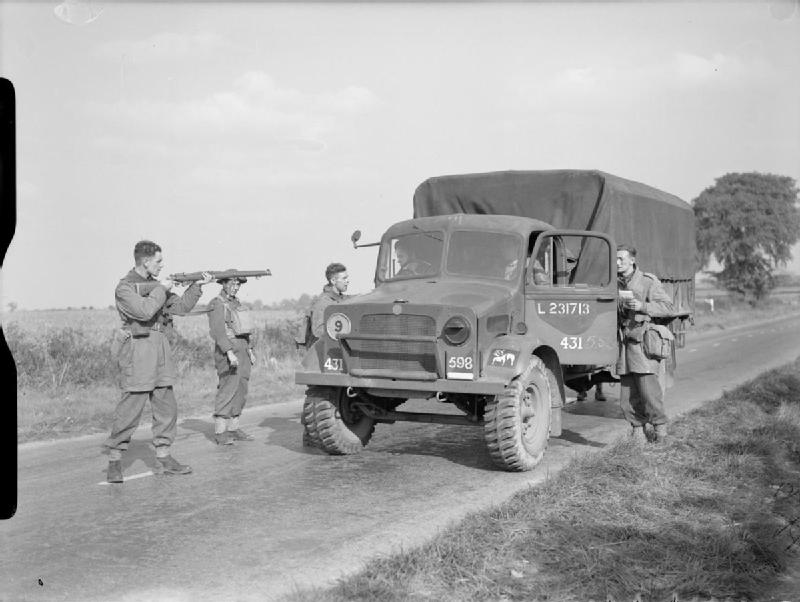
Parachute troops hold up an 'enemy' Bedford OYD lorry during Exercise 'Bumper', 2 October 1941

== Technical data ==
- Engine: Bedford 6-cylinder, type WD, 3,519 cc (214 cubic inches) displacement, liquid cooled
- Horsepower: 72 at 3,000 rpm
- Transmission: 4-speed manual
- Transfer box: None
- Electrical system: 12 volt
- Brakes: Hydraulic with vacuum servo assistance
- Tyres: 10.50 - 16
- Fuel type: Petrol
- Fuel capacity: 145 litres (32 gallons)
- Range: 450 km (280 miles)
- Maximum speed: about 65 km/h (40 mph)

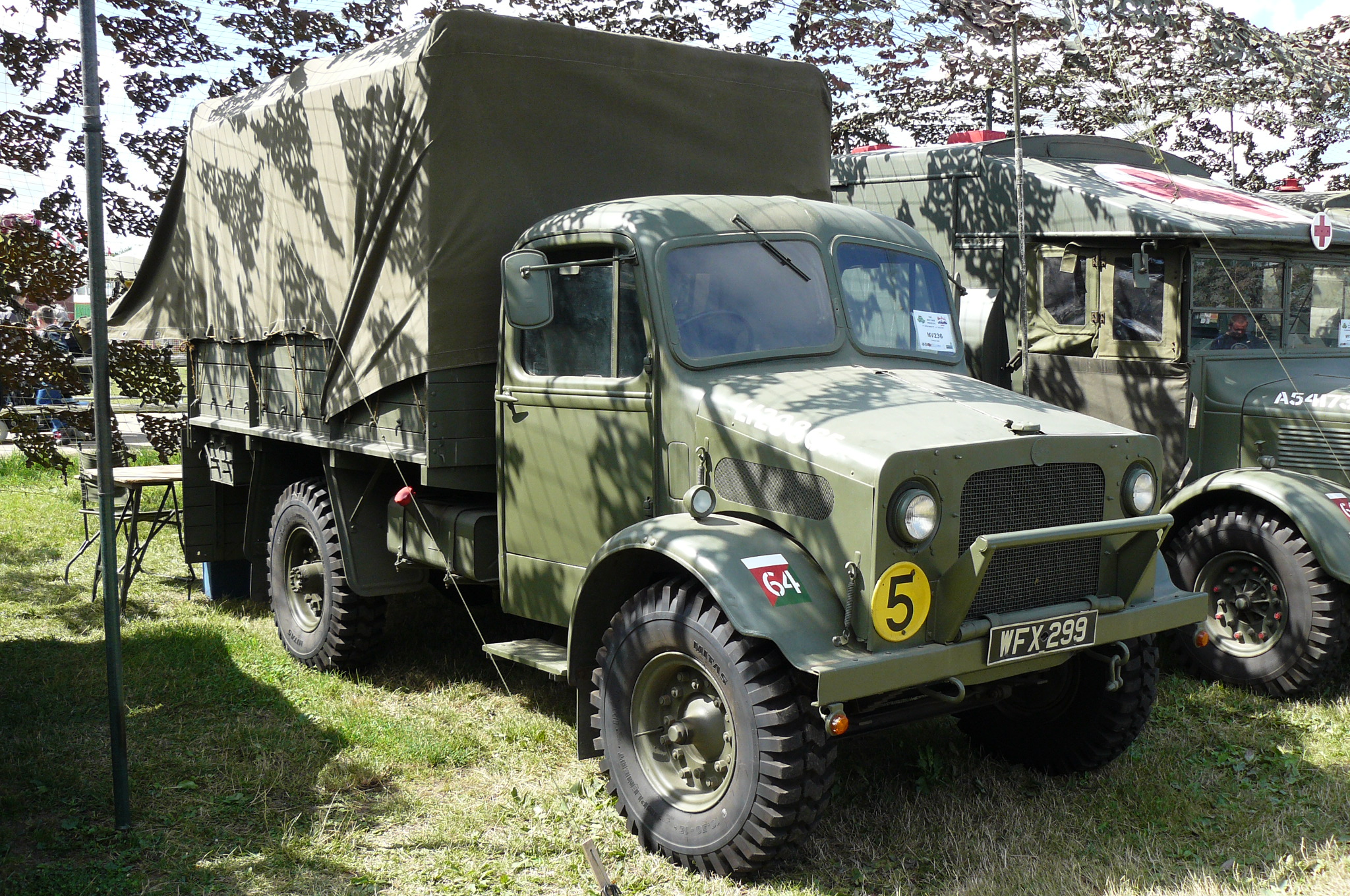
Bedford OXD as seen on War & Peace show 2011, UK

== Variants ==
- OYD - general service
- OYC - tanker

Derived non-military vehicles using OY and OX chassis

- OWS - 5-ton short wheelbase
- OWL - 5-ton long wheelbase
- OWB - 32 seat bus

== Bedford OX ==
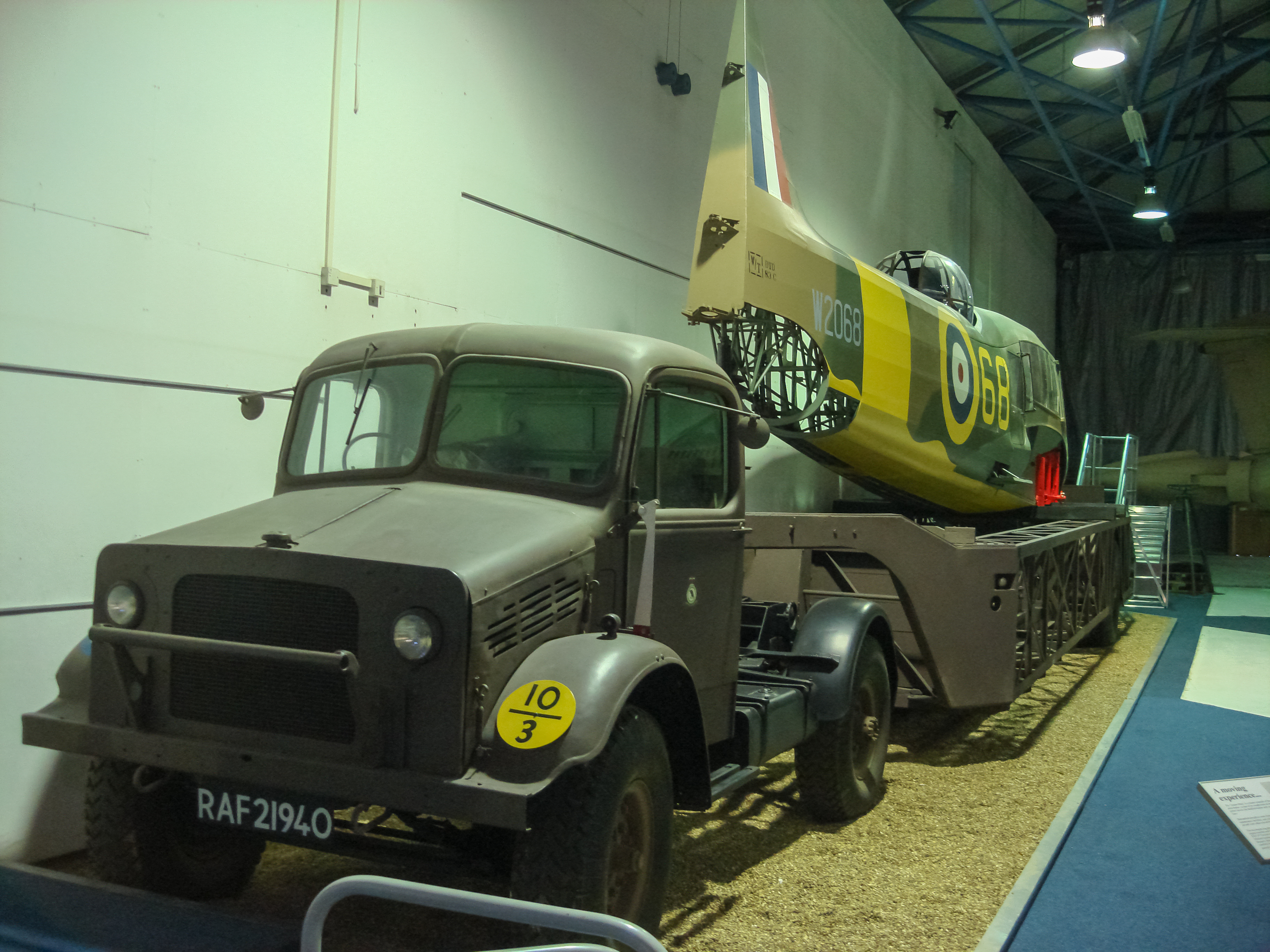
Bedford OXC towing a Queen Mary trailer

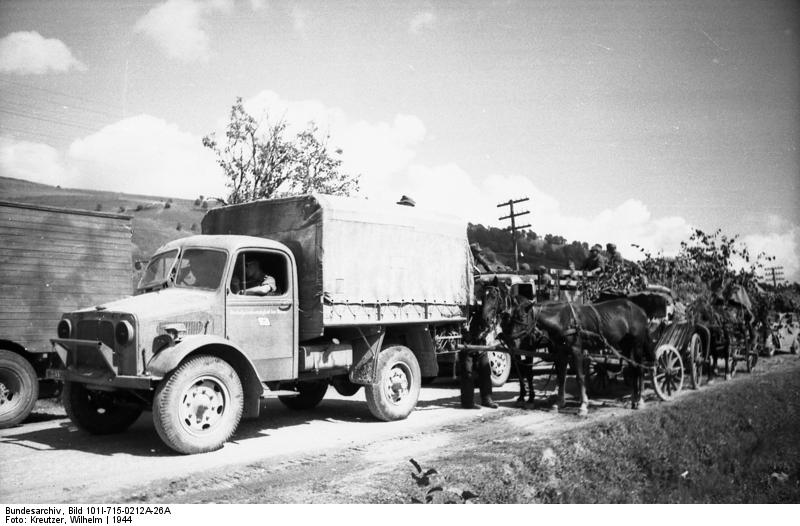
Bedford OXD captured by Germans in Hungary, 1944

The OX was a short-wheelbase version of the OY, designed for a 30 cwt (1.5 ton) payload. It had a semi-forward cab that resembled the 15-cwt Bedford MW.

The OXD was a general service vehicle with a 8 ft 8 in (2.64 m) by 6 ft 6 in (1.98 m) by 2 ft 3 in (0.69 m) tall body, while the OXC was designed, in association with Scammell, for use with a semi-trailer.

In the early part of the war, the addition of an armoured body to the OXD gave the Bedford OXA (official designation "Lorry 30cwt Anti-Tank"). These were used for home defence.
