= Pargiyot =

Israeli skewered chicken dish

Pargiyot is a popular Israeli skewered chicken dish that is cooked on a mangal and is commonly served for Israel Independence Day, and during the summer months.

== Etymology ==
The word pargiyot means "baby chicken" in Hebrew, referring to what was traditional meat of choice in the past for pargiyot. Today it is more commonly made with chicken thighs or breasts.

== Overview ==
Pargiyot consists of cubed chicken thighs (or breast) that have been marinated for a number of hours in a flavorful marinade often containing onions, parsley, garlic, and various spices or sauces such as harissa or amba. The pargiyot is then placed onto skewers similar to shish kebabs, and cooked on a grill such as a mangal. The pargiyot is grilled and the marinades create a flavorful crust on the outside of the chicken. Once it is finished, the chicken is commonly served with tehina sauce, or served with Israeli salad, rice or even a pita.
