= Turtle tank =

Russian tank with improvised extra armor

A Turtle Tank in May 2024, showing its improvised armour and mine clearance roller

The tsar mangal (Russian: Царь-мангал, tsar mangal, lit: Tsar of all Grills) or turtle tank refers to armored fighting vehicles that were fabricated from T-62, T-72 and T-80 tanks used by Russian Forces, and modified with extensive improvised steel roof and siding, as well as copious amount of anti-drone slat armor which cover the sides and rear of the host tank. The heavily modified armored fighting vehicles were spotted in action in early April 2024 in Krasnohorivka on the battlefield of the Russo-Ukrainian war. Equipped with extensive electronic warfare, these tanks resemble moving barns with turrets sticking out, making them a large and unusual sighting within the battlefield. Newer models are equipped with KMT 7 mine-clearing rollers with electromagnetic mine detector/trawl (Russian: Электромагнитный Тральщик Приставка ЭМТ.)

== Name ==
The main Russian term for these vehicles is Tsar Mangal, derived from the Russian slang "mangal" for anti-drone slat armor, in an analogy with other large weapons such as the Tsar Cannon and Tsar Bomba.

Most western sources denote it as the "turtle tank" due to its unusual turtle-shell appearance. Ukrainian military also dubbed it a "mobile barn". Other monikers include ‘blyatmobile’ (Блятьмобиль) and ‘assault garage’ (штурмовой гараж).

== Effectiveness ==
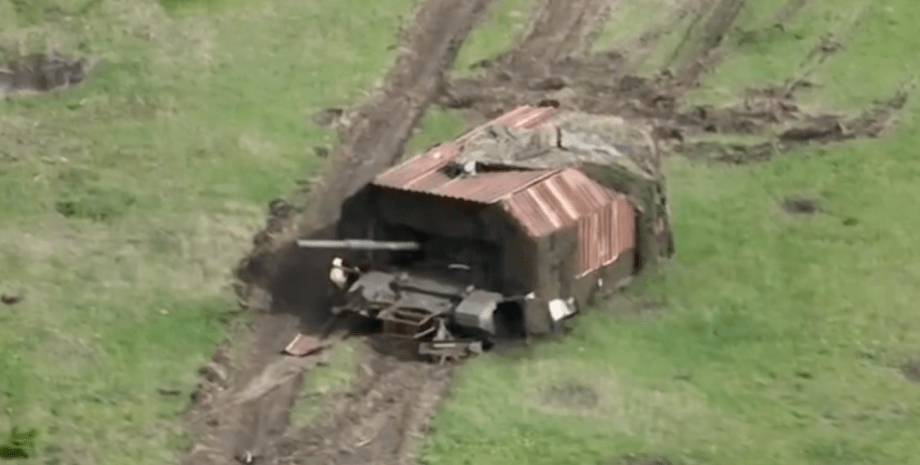
A damaged turtle tank in May 2024, showing armour built from corrugated iron

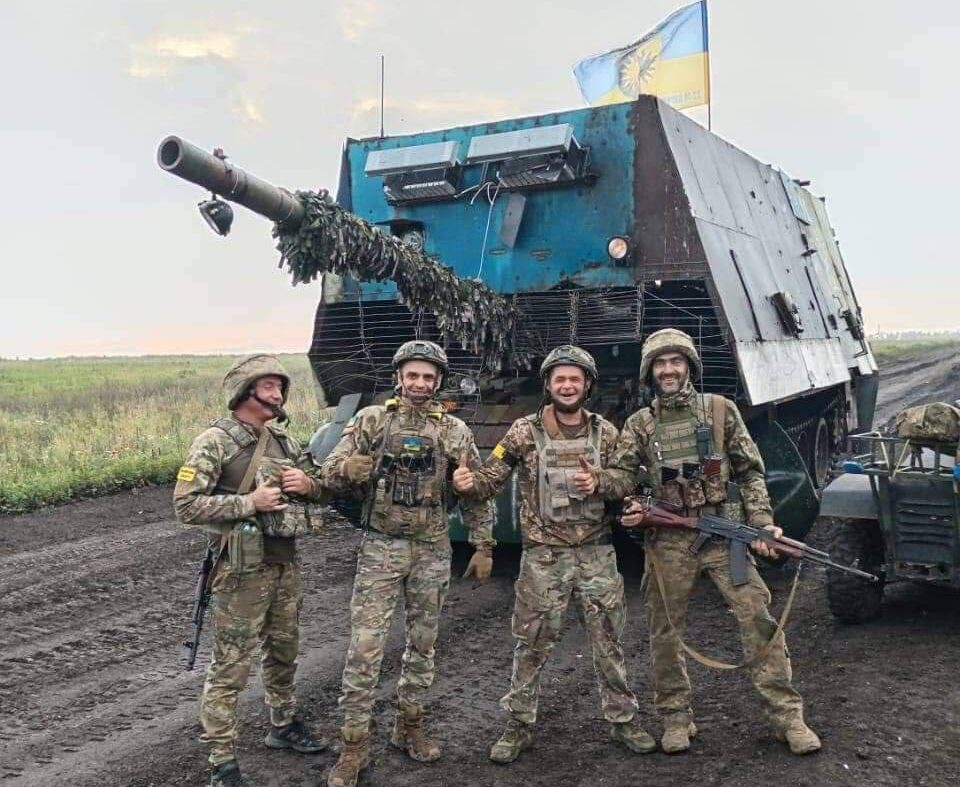
Captured Turtle Tank, June 2024

Turtle tanks are able to survive as many as 5 times the number of drone strikes as unmodified tanks.

Turtle tanks have suffered from a number of problems, with extensive footage of damaged turtle tanks appearing as they were increasingly utilized in combat roles. The major drawbacks come mainly from its barnlike structure, including poor visibility and mobility, as well as its non-rotating turret. It reportedly serves well as a demining vehicle during armoured assaults, but still can be damaged by mines and artillery. On 17 June 2024, Ukrainian media sources claimed that the Ukrainian army had captured one of the AFVs along with its crew somewhere in the Donetsk Oblast. The AFV was a T-62M with its ammunition removed and its turret fixed in place.

== See also ==
- Anti-drone cage
- Loitering munition
- Improvised vehicle armour
