= Red Light District Orderlies =

Group of Kazakh cannibals and serial killers

- Born: Sergey Mikhailovich Kopay; 1967; Alma-Ata, Kazakh SSR; Evgeny Turochkin; 1976 (age 49–50); Alma-Ata, Kazakh SSR; Mikhail Sergeyevich Vershinin; 1973 (age 52–53); Alma-Ata, Kazakh SSR
- Died: Kopay; 2008 (aged 40–41); Black Berkut Prison, Jitiqara, Kostanay Region, Kazakhstan
- Cause of death: Kopay; Cirrhosis
- Other names: "The Gang of Orderlies" "The Kazakh Cannibals" "The Kazakh Rippers"
- Conviction: Murder x7
- Penalty: Death; commuted to life imprisonment

Details
- Victims: 7+ (Kopay and Turochkin); 5+ (with Vershinin)
- Span of crimes: 1998–1999
- Country: Kazakhstan
- State: Almaty
- Date apprehended: April 1999
- Imprisoned at: Black Berkut Prison, Jitiqara, Kostanay Region

The Red Light District Orderlies (Russian: Санитары квартала красных фонарей, romanized: Sanitary kvartala krasnykh fonarey) was the name given to a gang of Kazakhstani serial killers and cannibals who murdered at least seven prostitutes in Almaty in 1998 and 1999, consuming some of their flesh afterwards. The nickname came from the fact that two of the perpetrators, Sergey Mikhailovich Kopay (Russian: Сергей Михайлович Копай; 1967 – 2008) and his half-brother Evgeny Turochkin (Russian: Евгений Турочкин; born 1976) worked as orderlies at a local psychiatric hospital, while a third one, Mikhail Sergeyevich Vershinin (Russian: Михаил Сергеевич Вершинин; born 1973), working there as a paramedic.

The gang's murders are considered some of the most high-profile cases in Kazakhstani criminal history.

== Background ==
=== Sergey Kopay ===
The Red Light District Orderlies, as they would later be called, were initially formed by two half-brothers named Sergey Mikhailovich Kopay and Evgeny Turochkin. The elder of the two, Kopay was born in Alma-Ata (now Almaty) in 1967, the child of a promiscuous mother who had a total of five children from different men. During his school years, he was unpopular at school and in his neighborhood, had no interest in studying or sports, and was generally ill-regarded by those around him. At an early age, Kopay started exhibiting sexual desires towards girls and women.

As a high school student, Kopay became an alcoholic, and after finishing 8th grade, he enrolled at "SPTU-13" in Alma-Ata, where he studied to be a plumber. He worked at a local enterprise until 1985, when he was drafted into the Soviet Army. After completing his mandatory service, he returned to Alma-Ata, where he got a job at the local police department, from where he was dismissed in 1992 for repeatedly turning up drunk at work. Following his dismissal, he got a job at the Republican Clinical Psychiatric Hospital as an orderly.

By the late 1990s, Kopay developed misogynistic views, as all three of his marriages had ended in divorce. His second wife, Elena, worked as a prostitute prior to their marriage. In addition to this, due to the low salary at the hospital, Kopay forced his third wife to become a prostitute when they ran out of money, even offering her services to friends and acquaintances.

=== Evgeny Turochkin ===
Kopay's younger half-brother, Turochkin was born in Alma-Ata in 1976. Despite the 9-year age gap, the two brothers were close and often spent their free time together drinking. Similarly to Kopay, Turochkin exhibited antisocial signs from an early age, had problems with communicating and was bullied by other children in the neighborhood. After completing the 8th grade, he enrolled at a vocational school, studying to be a machinist.

In 1994, Turochkin was drafted into the Armed Forces, where he was the victim of several beatings by older servicemen and suffered a head injury that heavily impacted his mental health. After the completion of his mandatory service, he returned to Alma-Ata, where he remained jobless for some time. This lasted until 1997, when, with the help of his older brother, he was given a position as an orderly at the Regional Clinical Psychiatric Hospital.

Unlike Kopay, Turochkin was unsuccessful with women and often used the services of prostitutes. By his own admission, he was often ridiculed by them for his erectile dysfunction, causing him to develop a hatred towards women. Due to his problems of adapting to society, he became closely attached to Kopay, who held great influence over Turochkin.

== Murders ==
=== Modus operandi ===
Between 30 April 1998 and 24 March 1999, Kopay and Turochkin (and later on, Mikhail Vershinin) committed the murders of several prostitutes in Almaty. Their modus operandi consisted of picking victims up from red-light districts and paying them to have sex with Kopay at his residence on 96 Shevchenko Street, in Apartment 11. The victim was always approached with caution, with the trio targeting lone women – if they noticed that somebody had seen them, they stopped the conversation and moved away. Once inside the apartment, the gang had sex and drank alcohol with the victims before they eventually drugged and sedated them.

Following this, they then proceeded to rape and then kill the victim, either by strangulation or stabbing. The corpses were then dismembered in the bathtub, with the gang consuming the soft tissues and making kotlet, shashlik, kebabs or mincemeat using a meat grinder. The remaining bones and other remains were promptly thrown into garbage cans, sewage wells, bodies of water and wastelands.

=== Initial murders ===
The initial murders were committed solely by Kopay and Turochkin, with the first victim being a young woman, aged approximately between 20 and 25 years of age. She was a prostitute often seen around one of Almaty's red-light districts, on the intersection between Seyfullina and Kramskoy Streets near the Almaty-1 railway station. Kopay stopped his car near the woman, paid her 500 tenge for her services and then brought her to the apartment, where Turochkin was waiting for them.

After having sex with the woman, the two men decided to rob her, as they were in dire need of money. Once the woman went into the bathroom, Kopay and Turochkin attacked her and stabbed her to death, after which they dismembered the body using various tools. They subsequently made kebab from her meat and ate it, after which they disposed of the other remains into several garbage cans on Maulenova Street. The larger bones were disposed of elsewhere, with different sources claiming that it was either into a septic tank at the intersection of Al-Farabi–Markova Streets, or put in a bag near the intersection of Al-Farabi–Shashkina Streets.

According to a later interview given by Kopay, the murder occurred as follows:

When she went to wash, I had some terrible anger. I took a knife from the kitchen, sharpened it, then went into the bathroom, took the girl with my left hand by the chin, and with my right hand I cut her throat. But, apparently, not quite well, she managed to say: "Do not kill me, I have two children." But it was too late. I grabbed her by the throat and held her against the wall until she died. We kept some of the meat. We decided to see what it tasted like. We took it and went to my mother's house, who lived with my sisters and brother. There we marinated the meat, and in the evening we made shashlik, saying that we had killed a stray dog. We also invited a neighbor to eat. He came over.

The second victim of the two killers was a mutual acquaintance named Alina Slivnaya-Merkulova. In early July 1998, the woman came to visit Kopay, where they all talked together and drank vodka. At some point, a quarrel arose between them, during which either Kopay himself or Turochkin strangled Slivnaya-Merkulova, but both later denied responsibility. According to Turochkin, the woman was accidentally cut while fighting with Kopay after he threw a shot glass at her – while the glass did not hit her, it instead broke into a nearby radiator, the shards of which led to the supposed cut. Tired of the ordeal, the trio went to sleep. On the following morning, the brothers found her dead in a pool of her own blood, supposedly due to a hemorrhage. They then dismembered the body and discarded the remains in a garbage can.

=== Acquaintanceship with Vershinin and induction into the gang ===
In November 1998, Kopay and Turochkin befriended a 25-year-old paramedic named Mikhail Sergeyevich Vershinin, who also worked at the Regional Clinical Psychiatric Hospital. They soon became close friends, due to which Vershinin started spending a lot of time at the apartment drinking alcohol with them.

Vershinin graduated from medical school with an incomplete higher education, and was married. After completing his qualifications, he changed several jobs, including working in an ambulance brigade. By the late 1990s, he found work as a paramedic at the hospital, where he would later meet the half-brothers. Prior to that, he did not drink nor smoke, and was a devout Jehovah's Witness.

Around December 1998, Kopay and Turochkin told Vershinin about the murders, including the fact that they had eaten some of the victims' soft tissues. Much to their astonishment, Vershinin appeared enthusiastic about the idea, revealing that he himself had been planning on ways to abduct and rape women without getting caught. He suggested that they continue committing crimes, and since Kopay had become a chronic alcoholic and suffered from health issues, while Turochkin showed signs of mental deterioration and had a weak character, Vershinin became the newly formed gang's main organizer. One of the first things he did was suggest that they start using diazepam as a sedative, the tablets and solution of which he personally stole in large quantities from their workplace.

=== Further murders ===
From January to March 1999, the gang murdered at least five more prostitutes, all following a similar pattern to what the half-brothers did with the first two victims. However, one main difference was that Turochkin also started sexually abusing the victims' corpses.

In January 1999, the gang picked up Olga Yakovenko, who had recently started prostituting herself on Seifullin Avenue to earn money. After killing and dismembering her body, the trio stored parts of her muscle tissue in the refrigerator, and leaving the bones and other remains in garbage cans in the yard of the student dormitories on Maulenova Street. Yakovenko's identity was quickly established after her fingerprints were examined, but authorities were unable to track down her killers. Investigators then started narrowing down the suspects to some of her clients, but were still unable to arrest anyone for the time being.

It would later emerge that Yakovenko was a former cohabitant of Alexander "Borman" Suvorov – coincidentally, Suvorov was the leader of an unrelated gang of serial killers nicknamed the Borman Gang, who killed at least 25 prostitutes in Almaty during the same period as the Red Light District Orderlies.

Following the next murder, while the body was being dismembered, Vershinin instructed Kopay and Turochkin to thoroughly clean the skull of any soft tissues, as he intended to use the skull to study human anatomy for his classes. He purchased caustic soda in advance and gave all the necessary instructions to the brothers on how to clean it, but both men failed to carry them out.

Turochkin later explained what happened:

When we dismembered the body, Kopay said that Vershinin would forgive us all our debts if we gave him the girl's skull. We did everything as Vershinin said and put the bucket on the stove. Then we drank more vodka and fell asleep. I woke up to the smell of smoke. It turned out that the water had boiled off and the contents of the bucket were burnt. Then, with the other remains of the body, I threw the skull into a dumpster outside the psychiatric hospital where we all worked.

The gang's last confirmed murder occurred on 24 March 1999, with the victim being Vershinin's mistress, Tatiana Bukareva. While Vershinin was initially attracted to her, he eventually stopped seeing her because of her drug addiction and threats to expose their relationship to his wife. According to his testimony, he lured Bukareva to Kopay's apartment with the promise that he would steal drugs for her, and once inside, told his accomplices that they should kill her. Taking advantage of the fact that she was drunk, Vershinin drugged her with a large dose of diazepam, then wrapped a towel around her neck and strangled her. The trio then dismembered the body, ate parts of her soft tissues and disposed of the rest in garbage cans around different parts of the city. Vershinin kept her skull to use for his studies.

== Arrest ==
The murders were investigated by operational teams and the regional Department of Internal Affairs. Since the missing and murdered women were all involved in prostitution, law enforcement agencies began staking out the red-light districts and systematically questioned the prostitutes. Police meticulously registered any client who had a violent criminal record, was an alcoholic, drug addict or was a former or current psychiatric patient.

The key break in the case came in April 1999, when two women informed the authorities that several days prior, two men presenting themselves as "Sergey Mikhailovich" and "Mikhail Sergeyevich" paid for their services and brought them back to an apartment on Shevchenko Street, where they spent time drinking alcohol with the two clients and a third, younger man. The two women then claimed that they were injected with some kind of mysterious substance and fell asleep. They woke up two days later and, finding that nobody was in the apartment at the time, immediately left. According to investigator Murat Jalilov, this led many of the officers to believe that these men might be the perpetrators, as most of the remains had been found close to that same apartment. (Note: According to Turochkin, the trio became prime suspects after investigators were supposedly tipped off about Vershinin paying off Kopay and Turochkin's debts using the fresh skull from the last victim. This veracity of this claim has not been verified.)

Accompanied by the two women, law enforcement officials went to the apartment building and knocked on the door indicated by them. The door was opened by Kopay, and during his conversation with the officers he became visibly nervous, denying that he had ever seen the two women. His behavior raised suspicions further, and he was then invited for additional questioning at the police station. Investigators soon became even more convinced that he was involved after learning that he worked at the Regional Clinical Psychiatric Hospital, near which the remains of one of the victims had been found in garbage cans. Some of the officers later claimed that after his arrest, Kopay was very surprised that he had been brought in to the regional police station and indignantly asked: "Why did you bring me to the regional? We killed prostitutes in the city."

== Confessions and trial ==
During the interrogation, Kopay admitted his guilt in the murders and testified against his accomplices, after which both Turochkin and Vershinin were arrested on the same day. In addition, he confessed to another crime that was unrelated to the murders – Kopay claimed that he and a former colleague from the police department, Nikolai Ledyaev, attempted to rob a trade organization and wounded a security guard in the process. Ledyaev was soon arrested and interrogated, and while he admitted to knowing about the murders, he was not directly involved.

The gang's motive was quickly established to be misogynistic, as all three believed that women engaged in prostitution were contributing to the moral decay of girls and women in society due to their lifestyle. Kopay, who had an excellent memory, accurately recalled the appearance of the victims and what clothes they wore. Both he and Vershinin expressed no remorse for their actions, in stark contrast to Turochkin, who burst into tears during one of the interrogations.

=== Psychiatric examination ===
Shortly before the trial began, Kopay retracted his confessions and began feigning insanity, claiming that he was hypnotized by a witch. In mid-2001, all three men requested to be transferred to a psychiatric facility for examination, which was granted. They were all found capable of standing trial, with the psychiatrists noting that Vershinin asserted himself as the leader due to a need to for approval from his friends. They also surmized that the two brothers developed misogynstic feelings because of their mother, while Vershinin's case on the opposite side, as he considered his mother to be oppressive and overprotective.

=== Media coverage ===
Following the trio's arrest, some newspapers covering the story made various claims about how the perpetrators and how they carried out the killings. Argumenty i Fakty made a variety of such claims, stating that the group were supposedly influenced by Satanism; sold the skulls to black magicians from the "Black Sect" and compared them to cults such as Aum Shinrikyo and the White Brotherhood. The veracity of these claims is uncertain.

=== Trial ===
The gang's trial began in mid-2001 at the Almaty City Court. During the hearings, all three defendants expressed indifference to the proceedings, all the while some of the victims' family members experienced such shock that they fainted. Due to this, an ambulance team was on constant standby near the courthouse in case this happened.

In the end, all three men were found guilty on every count, and on 28 September 2001, they were sentenced to death. Vershinin's mother fainted upon hearing the verdict, while his father Sergey – who also acted as his lawyer – cussed out the judge. Nikolai Ledyaev was convicted of the attempted robbery and failure to report a crime, for which he was sentenced to 8 years imprisonment and confiscation of his personal property.

In 2002, Kopay, Turochkin and Vershinin filed a joint appeal to the Supreme Court, arguing that the death sentence was unconstitutional and that they should be granted a new trial, but the appeal was rejected. Vershinin's father expressed indignation at the decision and repeatedly asserted that his son was innocent; that the investigation was marred with violations and accusations that the prosecutors convicted his son solely on the testimony of Kopay and Turochkin. In interviews with the press, Sergey Vershinin claimed that his son Mikhail would never apply for a pardon, as that would be like an admission of guilt.

Contrary to these claims, Mikhail Vershinin did eventually send a petition for a pardon to President Nursultan Nazarbayev on 18 December 2003, but did not receive a reply.

== Aftermath ==
On 1 January 2004, a moratorium on executions was introduced in Kazakhstan, after which the death sentences for all three gang members were commuted to life imprisonment. They were then transferred to serve out their sentences at the Black Berkut Prison in Jitiqara, Kostanay Region, the only facility in the country that accommodated life-sentenced prisoners.

Sergey Kopay died at the prison in 2008. According to former investigator Vladislav Bekshayev, he died from a prolonged illness caused by a myriad of health problems, the most prominent of which was cirrhosis of the liver. His wife left the country soon after his conviction and moved to Russia, leaving their son in the care of a family friend. Kopay's son later became homeless and also suffers from alcoholism.

Evgeny Turochkin is still incarcerated at the Black Berkut Prison, where he has a very negative reputation among prison staff due to repeated violations of disciplinary measures. In interviews with journalists, both he and Vershinin complained about the lack of work inside the prison, with Vershinin additionally complaining that he was malnourished.

In September 2017, the now-42-year-old Vershinin agreed to have an interview with journalists about his life inside the Black Berkut. In it, he stated that he maintains contact with his parents, while his wife filed for divorce after his arrest and left with their child for France. He finally admitted guilt for the murders and expressed apparent remorse for what he had done, claiming that he had converted to Christianity and had become a religious fanatic.

== In the media and culture ==
The Red Light District Orderlies' case was covered on several documentaries and true crime TV shows in the country. This includes the following:

- the documentary film "Kotlet from prostitutes. Stories of Kazakhstan cannibals" (Russian: Котлеты из проституток. Истории казахстанских каннибалов, romanized: Kotlety iz prostitutok. Istorii kazakhstanskikh kannibalov), aired on the KTK channel.
- the episode "The Cannibal Gang" (Russian: Банда людоедов) from the TV series "5:32" was inspired by the case.
- the episode "Inhumans" (Russian: Нелюди, romanized: Nelyudi) from the true crime series "It was business. The 90s." (Russian: Было дело. 90-е, romanized: Bylo delo. 90-ye)

== See also ==
- List of serial killers by country
- List of incidents of cannibalism
- Incidents of necrophilia

== Bibliography ==
- Askar Djaldinov (2020). Вне протокола. Тайны громких преступлений в Казахстане [Off the Record. Secrets of High-Profile Crimes in Kazakhstan] (in Russian). Case.
