= List of equipment of the Syrian Armed Forces =

This is an inventory of military equipment currently operated by the Syrian Armed Forces. The organization and military doctrine of the former Ba'athist-led Syrian Arab Armed Forces were influenced by the doctrines of the Soviet Union, Syria's closest ally. The Syrian Arab Army has traditionally relied on the Soviet Union and its successor the Russian Federation as its main supplier of military equipment. As a result of the Syrian civil war, many vehicles and much heavy equipment has been destroyed or captured, with some stores being partially replenished from Russian stocks.

Following the fall of the Assad regime, Israel launched several strikes on Syrian strategic bases, destroying up to 80% of the country's ammunition stocks as well as their navy, most of their air force and the majority of their strategic weapons stocks. Restructuring of the Syrian military is currently ongoing with Turkish military assistance.

== Protective gear and combat uniforms ==
Name	Photo	Origin	Type	Quantity	Notes
EMR Desert		Russia	Combat uniform	N/A	Standard issue.
MultiCam		United States	Combat uniform	N/A	Standard issue.
Advanced Combat Helmet		United States; Iran	Combat helmet	N/A	Iranian-made copy. Standard issue.
FAST		United States	Combat helmet	N/A	Standard issue. Used by security forces and special forces.
Ruyin-5		Iran	Body armor	N/A	Standard issue.
Ruyin-2		Iran	Body armor	N/A	Used by security forces.

== Small arms ==
=== Pistols ===
Name	Photo	Origin	Cartridge	Notes
Canik TP9		Turkey; Germany	9×19mm Parabellum.40 S&W; 9×21mm IMI	Donated by Turkey. Variant of the Walther P99.
Girsan Regard Compact		Turkey; Italy	9x19mm Parabellum	Copy of the Beretta 92F. Bought by Ba'athist Syria before the Syrian civil war. Captured from Ba'athist forces.
Browning Hi-Power		Belgium; United States	9×19mm Parabellum	13-round magazine. Captured from the Ba'athist-era Public Security Police.
M1911 pistol		United States	.45 ACP	Captured from Ba'athist forces during the Syrian civil war.
Makarov pistol		Soviet Union	9×18mm Makarov	Captured from Ba'athist forces during the Syrian civil war.

=== Carbines ===
Name	Photo	Origin	Cartridge	Notes
AKS-74U		Soviet Union	5.45×39mm M74	Seen in use by the Syrian Republican Guard during Syrian president Ahmed al-Sharaa's visit to Aleppo.
CZ BREN 2		Czech Republic	5.56×45mm NATO	Seen in use by some units.
Steyr AUG		Austria	Unknown	Entered the country through Syrian opposition forces after the start of the Syrian civil war.
M4 carbine		United States	5.56×45 mm NATO	Used by special forces.

=== Battle and semi-auto rifles ===
Name	Photo	Origin	Cartridge	Notes
SKS		Soviet Union	7.62×39mm M43	Used for ceremonial purposes.
Heckler & Koch G3		Germany	7.62×51mm NATO	Donated by Turkey. 10, 20 or 40-round detachable box magazine, G3A3 and G3A4 variants. Formerly used by the Syrian Republican Guard under Ba'athist rule. Primarily used by security forces.

=== Assault rifles ===
Name	Photo	Origin	Cartridge	Notes
M16 rifle		United States	5.56×45 mm NATO	Used by special forces.
AK-47		Soviet Union	7.62×39mm M43/M67	Standard issue. Also seen in use by security forces, alongside as a ceremonial weapon.
AKM AKMS		Warsaw Pact states	7.62×39mm M43	Seen in use by the army and security forces.
AK-103		Russia	7.62×39mm M43	Seen in use by the army and security forces.
Kale KCR		Turkey	5.56×45 mm NATO	Donated by Turkey.

=== Sniper rifles ===
Name	Photo	Type	Origin	Cartridge	Notes
FN FAL		Designated marksman rifle	Belgium	7.62×51mm NATO.308 Winchester	12,000 bought in 1957.
PSL		Marksman rifle	Socialist Republic of Romania	7.62×54mmR	
SVD		Marksman rifle	Soviet Union	7.62×54mmR	
Zastava M91		Sniper rifle	Federal Republic of Yugoslavia	7.62×54mmR	10-round magazine. Captured from the Syrian Democratic Forces.
ASVK		Anti-material rifle	Russia	12.7 × 108 mm	Possibly in use by special forces.
Steyr HS .50		Anti-material rifle	Austria	12.7 × 108 mm	Golan S-01 variant. Previously in service with Syrian Army and special forces under Ba'athist rule. Possibly in use by special forces.

=== Submachine guns ===
Name	Photo	Type	Origin	Cartridge	Notes
Heckler & Koch MP5		Submachine gun	West Germany / Germany	10mm Auto	In use by the Syrian Navy.

=== Machine guns ===
Name	Photo	Origin	Cartridge	Notes
Pecheneg machine gun		Russia	7.62×54mmR	Possibly seen in use by border patrol officers.
PKM		Soviet Union	7.62×54mmR	Standard issue.
NSV		Soviet Union	12.7×108mm	
DShKM		Soviet Union	12.7x108mm	
W85		China	12.7×108mm	

== Grenade and grenade launchers ==
Name	Photo	Type	Origin	Diameter	
F-1		Hand grenade	Soviet Union	55 mm	
RGD-5		Hand grenade	Soviet Union	58 mm	
RGN		Hand grenade	Soviet Union	60 mm	
GP-25/GP-30M/GP-34		Grenade launcher	Soviet Union	40x53mm grenade	Single shot under-barrel grenade launcher.
AGS-17		Automatic grenade launcher	Soviet Union	30×29mm grenade	

== Anti-tank launchers ==
Name	Photo	Type	Origin	Caliber	Quantity	Notes
RPG-7		Rocket-propelled grenade	Soviet Union	40mm	N/A	Ammunition: PG-7V (85 mm) PG-7VL (93 mm) PG-7VR (64/105 mm) OG-7V (40 mm).

== Unmanned aerial vehicles ==
Name	Photo	Quantity	Origin	Type	Notes
Improvised FPV drones		N/A	Syria	Improvised loitering munition	
Shaheen		N/A	Syria	Loitering munition	Seen during the 2024 Syrian opposition offensives

== Vehicles ==
=== Tanks ===
Name	Photo	Quantity	Origin	Notes
T-55A/AM/AMV/M/MV		N/A	Soviet Union	
T-62		N/A	Soviet Union	Seen in use by the 56th Division.
T-72/T-72 Adra		N/A	Soviet Union; Czechoslovak Socialist Republic / Ba'athist Syria	Seen in use during the 2026 northeastern Syria offensive.

=== Infantry fighting vehicles ===
Name	Photo	Quantity	Origin	Notes
BMP-1P		N/A	Soviet Union	
Fath Safir		At least 1	Iran	Seen in use during the 2026 northeastern Syria offensive.
BTR-80		N/A	Soviet Union	

=== Armoured personnel carriers ===
Name	Photo	Origin	Quantity	Notes
Humvee		United States	At least 3	Captured and inherited from Syrian Democratic Forces.
BMC Amazon		Turkey	At least 6	Donated by Turkey.
BTR-50		Soviet Union	450	During the war, some BTR-50s were reactivated and issued to mechanized infantry.
MT-LB		Soviet Union	N/A	Additional units delivered by Russia. At least 4 MT-LB vehicles were seized by Syrian Opposition forces.
Al-Fatih		Syria	N/A	Shown at the Syrian Revolution Military Expo. Unclear if currently in use.
Al-Karar		Syria	N/A	Originally created by Hay'at Tahrir al-Sham. Frequently used in assaults.
Al-Ra'd		Syria	At least 10	Originally created by Hay'at Tahrir al-Sham in late 2024. Seen during the 2024 Syrian opposition offensives. One was captured by the Syrian Democratic Forces during the 2026 northeastern Syria offensive.
M113		United States	At least 6	Donated by Turkey.
Nurol Ejder		Turkey	N/A	Several Ejder 6x6 armored personnel carriers were seen during Syria's Liberation Day parade in Damascus on 8 December 2025.
Otokar Cobra I Otokar Cobra II		Turkey	N/A	Donated by Turkey.
NMS Yörük		Turkey	N/A	
Terrier LT-79		United States	N/A	

=== Reconnaissance vehicles ===
Name	Photo	Type	Origin	Quantity	Notes
BRM-1K		Armoured reconnaissance vehicle	Soviet Union	N/A	Supplied by Russia between 2017 and 2018. At least 4 BRM-1K vehicles were seized by Syrian Opposition forces.

=== Military engineering ===
Name	Type	Quantity	Origin	Photo	Notes
Bobcat S650	Skid-steer loader	At least 1	United States		
MEMATT	Mine clearance	At least 2	Turkey		
BREM-1	Armoured recovery vehicle	97	Soviet Union		Deployed in the Rif Dimashq Governorate campaign in Syrian Civil War. 4 BREM-1 lost in the civil war. At least 3 BREM-1 vehicles were seized by Syrian Opposition forces.
KMT 5 M	Mine clearance	At least 1	Soviet Union		Seen in used by the 98th Division.

=== Logistics vehicles ===
Name	Type	Quantity	Origin	Photo	Notes
Mercedes-Benz Actros	8×4 off-road truck	N/A	Germany		Chassis of the M-46 W-SPG.
Iveco Trakker	8×8 off-road truck	N/A	Italy		Chassis of the M-46 W-SPG.
Scania G490	10x4 utility truck	N/A	Sweden		
Sinotruk Howo	4×4 side truck 6×6 utility truck	N/A	China		Transport vehicle for motorized infantry.

=== Utility vehicles ===
Name	Type	Quantity	Origin	Photo	Notes
Toyota Land Cruiser	Utility vehicle	N/A	Japan		Model 70 variant. Widely used as a technical.
Mitsubishi Triton	Utility vehicle	N/A	Japan		
Toyota Hilux	Utility vehicle	N/A	Japan		
Nissan Navara	Utility vehicle	N/A	Japan		

== Artillery ==
=== Towed artillery ===
Name	Type	Quantity	Origin	Photo	Notes
130 mm towed field gun M1954 (M-46)	Field gun	N/A	Soviet Union		
122 mm howitzer 2A18 (D-30)	Howitzer	N/A	Soviet Union		

=== Self-propelled field artillery ===
Name	Type	Quantity	Origin	Photo	Notes
2S1 Gvozdika	Self-propelled howitzer	50	Soviet Union		122 mm. 300 as of 2011. 94 lost in the civil war. At least 16 2S1 self-propelled howitzers were seized by Syrian Opposition forces.
130 mm M-46 W-SPG	Self-propelled gun	N/A	Italy; Germany; Ba'athist Syria		On Iveco Trakker and Mercedes-Benz Actros chassis. Produced and modified in Syria by SSRC since 2013.

=== Multiple rocket launchers ===
Name	Caliber	Quantity	Origin	Photo	Notes
BM-21 Grad	122mm	N/A	Soviet Union		

== Bibliography ==
- Campbell, David (16 June 2016). Israeli Soldier vs Syrian Soldier: Golan Heights 1967–73. Bloomsbury Publishing. ISBN 978-1-4728-1331-2.
- Zaloga, Steven J. (20 July 2011). Unmanned Aerial Vehicles: Robotic Air Warfare 1917–2007. Bloomsbury Publishing. ISBN 978-1-84603-786-3.
