= Borman Gang =

Group of Kazakh serial killers

- Банда Бормана
- Years active: 1998–2000
- Conviction: Murder
- Penalty: Various

Details
- Victims: 29
- Country: Kazakhstan
- State: Almaty

The Borman Gang (Russian: Банда Бормана) is the nickname given to a gang of Kazakhstani serial killers and rapists led by Alexander Olegovich "Borman" Suvorov (Russian: Александр Олегович Суворов; born 1967), who were responsible for the murders of at least 29 people in Almaty from 1998 to 2000. The majority of the gang's victims were prostitutes, but they were also known to have targeted teenage girls and at least four men in apparent robberies.

The gang is considered one of the most unique criminal cases in the country and in the entire post-Soviet sphere, since it was a "community of rapist-killers" that had never been encountered prior or since their dismantling.

== Background ==
=== Alexander Suvorov ===
Little is known about the founder of the gang and his background. Alexander Suvorov was born in 1967 in Alma-Ata, and during his school years, he was noted by his teachers for having a sharp intuition, high intelligence and an excellent memory. However, he exhibited no interest in studying and tried to downplay his abilities.

In his teenage years, Suvorov's mental health deteriorated, as he began to have mood swings – when depressed, he was prone to being ill; was reliant on others and considered impressionable. On the other hand, if he was being hyperactive, Suvorov acted impulsively, had uncontrollable bursts of anger and lashed out against others.

In the mid-1980s, after the enactment of the "On Cooperation" law and the blossoming of the cooperative movement that allowed criminals to profit from racketeering, Suvorov was drawn to the lifestyle and soon became an active participant in it. During these years, he was imprisoned at least seven time on various charges, and subsequently gained the respect of fellow inmates, most of which called by the nickname "Borman".

In the mid-1990s, Suvorov became a drug addict and soon moved in with a woman named Olga Yakovenko, who also abused drugs. However, the pair often quarreled, leading to Suvorov kicking her out of their shared apartment in mid-1998. Due to her financial situation, Yakovenko soon began prostituting herself on Seyfullina Avenue – in January 1999, she was murdered by a gang of cannibals called the Red Light District Orderlies, who coincidentally operated at the same time and had similar victim preferences to Suvorov's own gang.

=== Formation of the gang and members ===
In early 1998, Suvorov formed a gang with multiple members consisting of both ethnic Russians and Kazakhstanis. The members were the following:

- Alexander Vasilyevich "Sanek" Popikov (born 1962);
- Vladimir Vladimirovich "Volokha Sibiryak" Isupov (born 1967);
- Andrey Valeryevich "Sunya" Suschikh (born 1964);
- Nikolai Nikolayevich "Kolya Dyryavi" Aksyonov (born 1967);
- Yerulan Arystanovich "Yerzhik" Suleimenov (born 1974);
- Anvar Temirkhanovich "Khan" Karazhanov (born 1966);
- Serik Zharollayevich "Serko" Myngyshev (born 1967);
- Elena Mikhailovna "Lena Ryzhaya" Mikhaltsova (born 1967);
- Elena Nikolayevna Zheleznova (born 1982);
- Ekaterina Anatolievna "Komsomolskaya Pravda" Tsiopko (born 1982);
- Anastasia Arturovna Gerlakh (born 1982);
- Elena Anatolievna Demidenko (born 1982);
- Marina Nikolayevna Bespyatykh (born 1968) and
- Vera Aleksandrovna Emelyanova (born 1982).

All members of the gang were addicted to drugs and abused alcohol. Initially, the gang was engaged in theft and robbery, with the women engaging in prostitution and giving their earnings to Suvorov, who was their pimp. Due to long-term and systematic drug use, all the men in the gang, including Suvorov, had problems in their personal lives, because of which they hated women. Suvorov and the other members analyzed methods of abducting and raping women without being caught.

In mid-1998, after several conflicts with prostitutes whom Suvorov had attempted to recruit into his circle of influence, he suggested to the other gang members that they start killing them. The women in the group agreed to participate, as they could eliminate rivals in the prostitution business.

== Murders ==
As victims, the "Borman Gang" chose young women in their 20s and 30s who were engaged in prostitution in the area of the Almaty-1 railway station and Seyfullina Street, leading upwards to Almaty. After placing the woman in Popikov's car, the gang members would take her to a wooded or suburban area – either the Iliyskiy or Karasayskiy districts – where they would subject the victim to beatings and various physical and sexual abuse, including inserting objects into her body. Once finished, the gang would kill the victim in a variety of ways ranging from beating to death with stones and hammers; stabbing them with knives or hanging them from trees using their pantyhoses, belts or other clothing articles. Any valuables or jewelry found on the victim was also stolen.

Almost all the killings involved Elena Mikhaltsova, who used her charisma as "bait" to calm down and lure in the unsuspecting victims. Besides prostitutes, the gang also killed three underage schoolgirls using this same tactic. Seven of the victims were never identified.

=== List of female victims ===
Date of attack	Identity	Age
26 June 1998	Jane Doe No. 4	Unknown
4 July 1998	Jane Doe No. 5	Unknown
12 July 1998	Jane Doe No. 1	Unknown
8 August 1998	Jane Doe No. 6	Unknown
17 August 1998	Jane Doe No. 7	Unknown
30 August 1998	"Kriegert"	Unknown
7 September 1998	Jane Doe No. 2	Unknown
9 September 1998	"Malkina"	Unknown
16 September 1998	Kristina Bulatova	15
18 October 1998	Jane Doe No. 3	Unknown
26 October 1998	"Tabakova"	Unknown
27 October 1998	"Shitikova"	Unknown
13 December 1998	"Bulgakova"	Unknown
16 December 1998	Saule Topayeva	Unknown
12 March 1999	"Yurko"	Unknown
15 March 1999	"Kudaibergenova"	Unknown
14 April 1999	"Turdiyeva"	Unknown
12 May 1999	"Salabatova"	Unknown
8 June 1999	"Priymak"	Unknown
10 June 1999	"Tungatarova"	Unknown
15 June 1999	Dilya Kamolova	21
19 September 1999	"Malenkova"	Unknown
24 September 1999	"Volkova"	Unknown
7 October 1999	"Kozel"	Unknown
16 February 2000	"Abarakhmanova"	Unknown

== Investigation and arrests ==
=== Suvorov and Isupov ===
Initially, the murders were not linked together as they occurred in different areas of Almaty, but were eventually consolidated into a single case file in late 1999. Following this, a special investigative unit consisting of several government and local agencies was formed in order to apprehend the suspects.

The first suspects were Suvorov and his close associate Vladimir Isupov, who were both detained for possession of heroin in January 1999. As a known pimp, he was repeatedly questioned, but investigators initially dismissed him as the killings continued. They resumed looking into him in late 1999, after it was found that he was in contact with Andrey Suschikh and Elena Mikhaltsova, who also lived near the Almaty-1 railway station. By this time, Mikhaltsova had quit prostituting herself and had become a pimp.

Investigators realized that one of the victims, 21-year-old Dilya Kamolova, was acquainted with Mikhaltsova and lived with her until her death in June 1999. After looking further into the pair's social circle, investigators learned the names of a number of other acquaintances known only by their first names, all of whom were in close contact with "Borman" since the murders began.

In December 1999, Suvorov was again interrogated at the SIZO-1 in Almaty about the murders. Unlike his previous categorical denials, he started comntemplating what to do when he was told that the police were looking into his acquaintances. Lt. Col. Alik Shpekbaev later shared that although the evidence against Suvorov was very circumstantial, he suggested to the officers that they look into Suschikh and Mikhaltsova, and he might help them out.

Isupov, who also initially refused to cooperate, later changed his mind and said that he wanted to familiarize himself with the other gang members' confessions.

=== Follow-up arrests ===
On 18 January 2000, officers detained Andrey Suschikh, but he managed to escape and board onto a train at the Almaty-1 railway station. For unexplained reasons, he returned home two days later and was arrested a second time in the company of a drug dealer.

In the first interrogation, he fully admitted his guilt for purchasing and possession of drugs, but refused to admit involvement in the murders. Only four days later, once he learned that Suvorov had expressed willingness to cooperate, Suschikh began giving confessions at a rapid rate. However, the circumstances he described did not match any of the known murders.

During that same period, another gang member, Anvar Karazhanov, was arrested and later convicted of killing Jane Doe No. 4. On 7 February 2000, another member, Alexander Popikov, was arrested for the rape and attempted murder of an underage girl named Galkina in the Iliyskiy district.

Initially, Karazhanov and Popikov claimed that they acted alone and had nothing to do with Suvorov. However, their claims were refuted by the fact that semen traces found on the bodies of some of the victims belonged to multiple different men. Despite this, Karazhanov claimed that he was solely responsible for one murder, while Popikov unexpectedly admitted for a further 11 murders that he claimed to have done by himself.

On 16 March 2000, 37-year-old Alexander Popikov hanged himself with his own pants in his cell in SIZO-1, leaving a suicide note in which he asked law enforcement officers not to blame his cellmates for his death. After his suicide, the investigation into the case was suspended, as no evidence linking Popikov and Karazhanov to Suvorov or Isupov was located.

=== Dissolution ===
After Suschikh's arrest, Mikhaltsova and the remaining members panicked and deliberately provoked their arrests on charges such as theft and drug possession. Upon learning of this, the task force officers suspected that they wanted to be imprisoned on milder charges and divert attention from themselves. However, Alik Shpekbaev, together deputy head investigator Vasily Ralchenko and the deputy head of the Department of Internal Affairs of Almaty Farhad Nurmukhamedov decided to transfer all those arrested to a more secure detention center, where they subjected them to cross-examination. Through this, they learned the names of even more gang members, all of whom were caught.

Initially, Suvorov used his influence in the criminal underworld to force his accomplices to remain silent by sending them letters or telling their cellmates to threaten them with physical violence. This all ceased on the orders of Berik Shymyrbaev, a thief in law who, after learning about the nature of the case, prohibited anybody from following Suvorov's commands. Having lost his credibility, Suvorov eventually confessed, but sometimes made mistakes about various details due to the large number of crimes his gang committed. He explained this away by saying that most of the members were either drunk or on drugs.

=== Motive ===
In the beginning, Suvorov claimed that he and his gang killed prostitutes because they considered themselves "sanitarians of society" and fighters for morality and ethics, but later admitted that they carried out their crimes due to a hatred of women and severe drug addiction. His own reasons for doing this was relationship issues and his own personal failures in life. He also said that he had ordered the remaining gang members to continue killing women to divert attention from him and Isupov.

This happened as instructed, with some members such as Suschikh describing in vivid detail how some of the murders were carried out.

== Aftermath ==
In the spring of 2000, the most active members of the Borman Gang – Suvorov, Isupov, Suschikh and Mikhaltsova – were ordered to participate in investigative experiments to reconstruct how the murders occurred. At around the same time, the remaining female members unexpectedly confessed to an additional 60 murders, due to which they were repeatedly escorted to a various supposed burial sites between March to November 2000 almost daily, except for Sundays. Despite their confessions, only one grave was found in October near the village of Kamenka, from which investigators only unearthed the bones of a cow and a horse. Later on, the women admitted that they had lied and made the entire thing up only so they could be away from prison, where fellow inmates constantly harassed and physically abused them for their participation in the crimes.

The gang's trial began in the summer of 2001. During the proceedings, Isupov died in 2002 from tuberculosis – upon learning of his fate, Suvorov and the remaining gang members shifted most of the blame on him and Popikov, demanding more lenient sentences, while the prosecutors sought the death penalty against all of them. However, since the prosecutor's office could neither confirm nor deny the testimony provided by the defendants, the court sided with the attorneys and allowed for more lenient sentences.

As a result, on 23 January 2003, the living members of the Borman Gang were convicted on a variety of charges and given different sentences. Suvorov and Suschikh were both given 25 years; Mikhaltsova was given 15 years, and the remaining members were given sentences ranging from 10 to 16 years each. None expressed any remorse for what they had done, or asked forgiveness from the victims' family members.

Due to the unusual and brutal nature of the case, the files related to it were sent to the Almaty Academy of the Ministry of Internal Affairs as a teaching aid to help train Kazakhstani detectives.

== See also ==
- Red Light District Orderlies
- List of serial killers by country

== In the media and culture ==
The Borman Gang's crimes were covered on the episode Inhumans (Russian: Нелюди) from the documentary series It happened. The 90s. (Russian: Было дело. 90-е).

== Bibliography ==
- Askar Djaldinov (2020). Вне протокола. Тайны громких преступлений в Казахстане [Off the Record. Secrets of High-Profile Crimes in Kazakhstan] (in Russian). Case.
