= Shish kebab =

Skewered meat dish

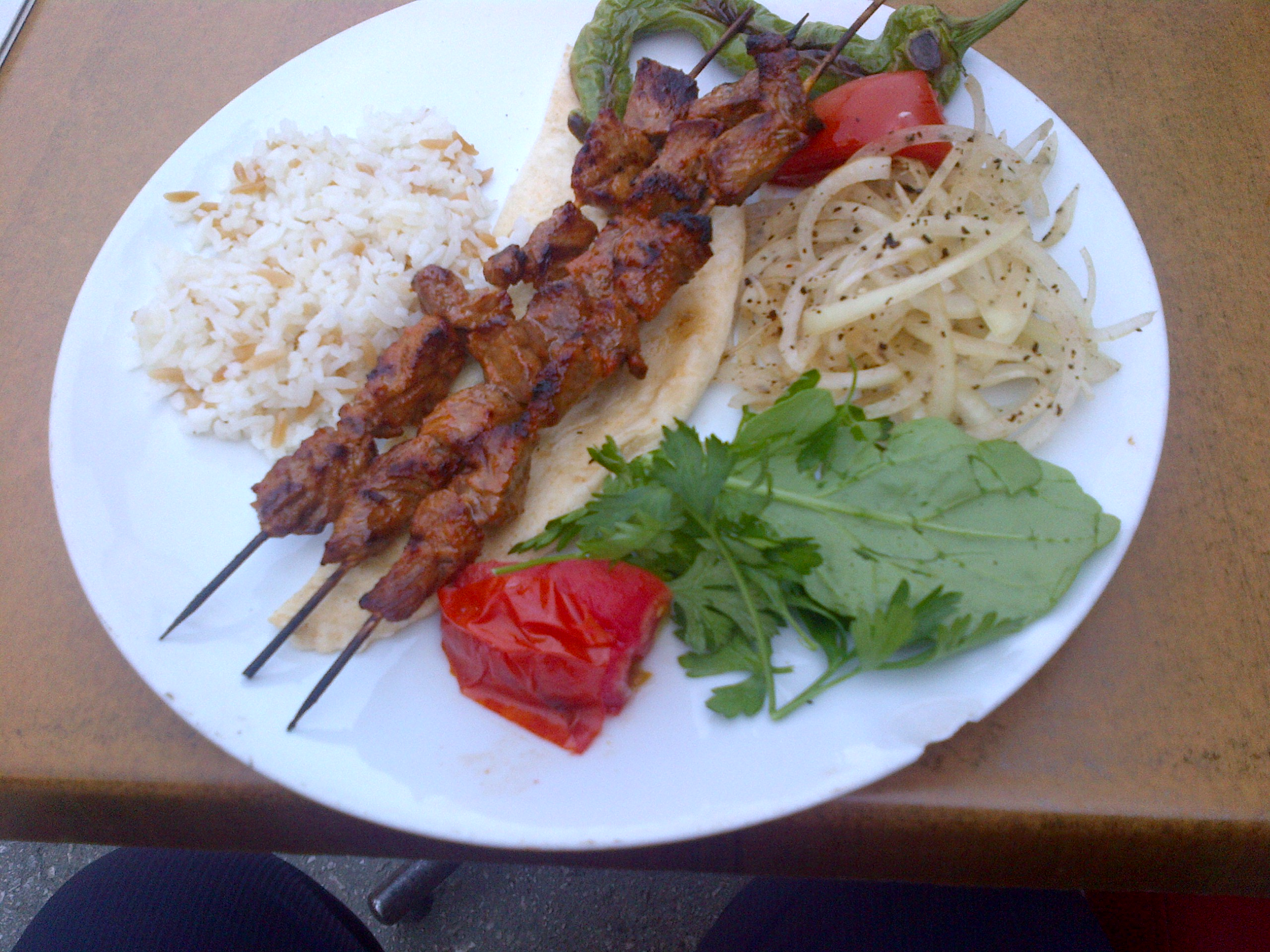
Shish kebab with orzo pilaf, onions with sumac, a grilled pepper, a grilled slice of tomato, and rucula leaves

Shish kebab or shish kebap is a popular dish of skewered and grilled cubes of meat, originating in the Middle East.

It is one of the many types of kebab, a range of meat dishes originating in the Middle East. In North American English, the word kebab alone often refers to shish kebab, though outside of North America, kebab may also mean doner kebab.

It is traditionally made of lamb but there are also versions with various kinds of meat, poultry, or fish.

== Etymology ==
The word Shısh evolved from the Old Turkic word *sış*, meaning "pointed stick." This word was derived from the Old Turkic verb *sı-* ("to cut") using the Old Turkic suffix *-Iş*.

The word kebab alone was already present in English by the late 17th century, from the Arabic: كَبَاب (kabāb), partly via Urdu, Persian and Turkish. Etymologist Sevan Nişanyan states that the word has the equivalent meaning of "frying / burning" with kabābu in the old Akkadian language, and kbabā (כבבא) in Aramaic.

According to the Oxford English Dictionary, its earliest known publication in English is in the 1914 novel Our Mr. Wrenn by Sinclair Lewis.

== History ==
=== Greece ===
Kebabs existed as far back as the 17th century BC Minoan civilization. In Homer's Odyssey, there are descriptions of skewering strips of meat for broiling. Clifford A. Wright considers these an early version of shish kebab. In Classical Greece and Hellenistic Greece, kebabs were prepared in ancient Athenian taverna sites. They were grilled on an eschara.

Kebabs were also staples in the Byzantine Empire; there is iconographical evidence of Byzantine Greeks preparing them.

=== Egypt ===
Several varieties of shish kebab are popular in Egyptian cuisine. Skewers of grilled seasoned ground meat are called kofta. Shish taouk, which are skewers of grilled marinated chicken chunks, are another popular variety of kebab in Egypt.

== Gallery ==
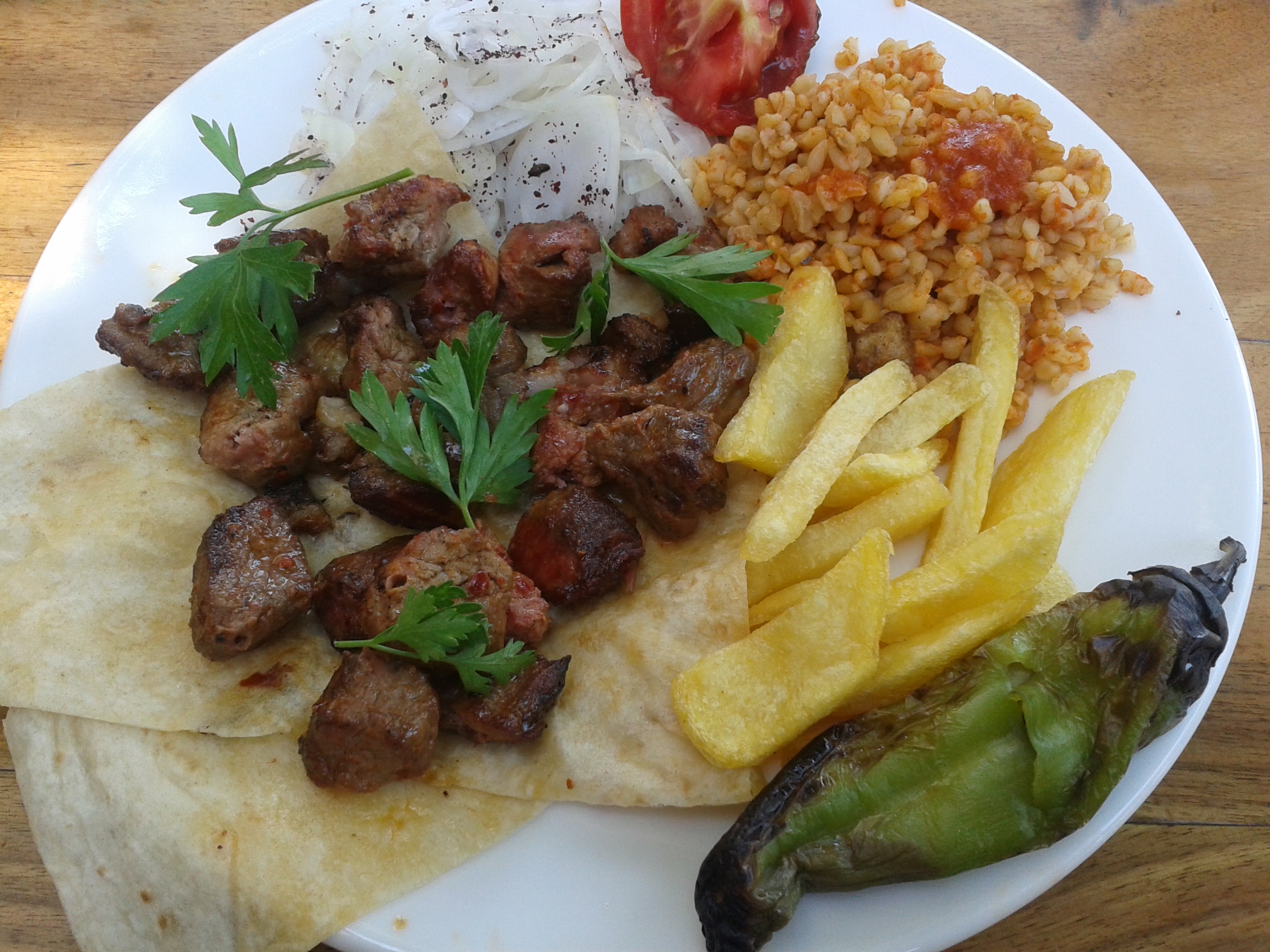
Shish kebab

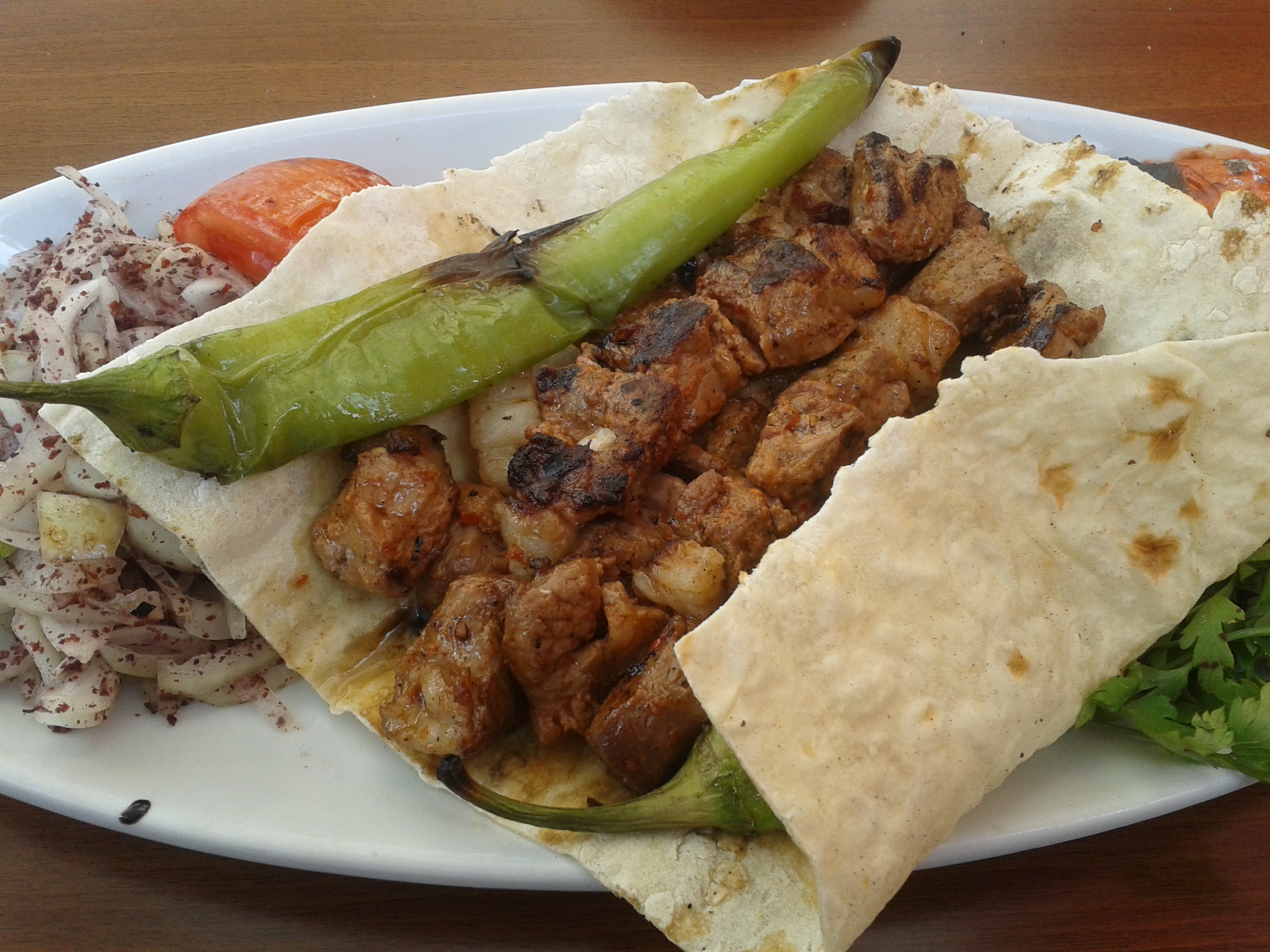
Shish kebab in Ankara

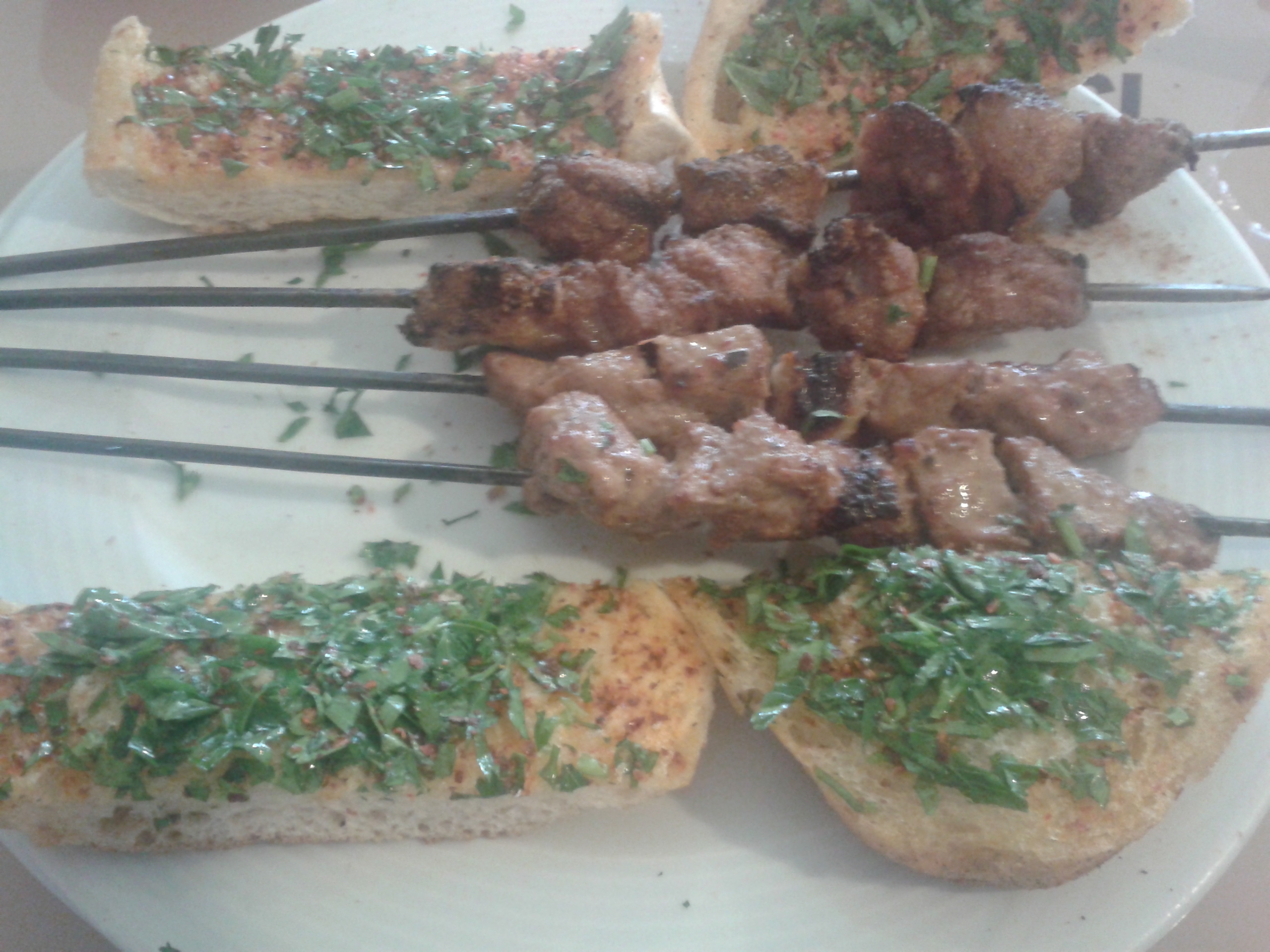
Lamb shish

== See also ==
- Arrosticini
- Souvlaki
- List of kebabs
- List of meat dishes
- Satay
- Shashlik
- Yakitori
