= Slat armor =

Vehicle armor to protect against shaped charge warheads

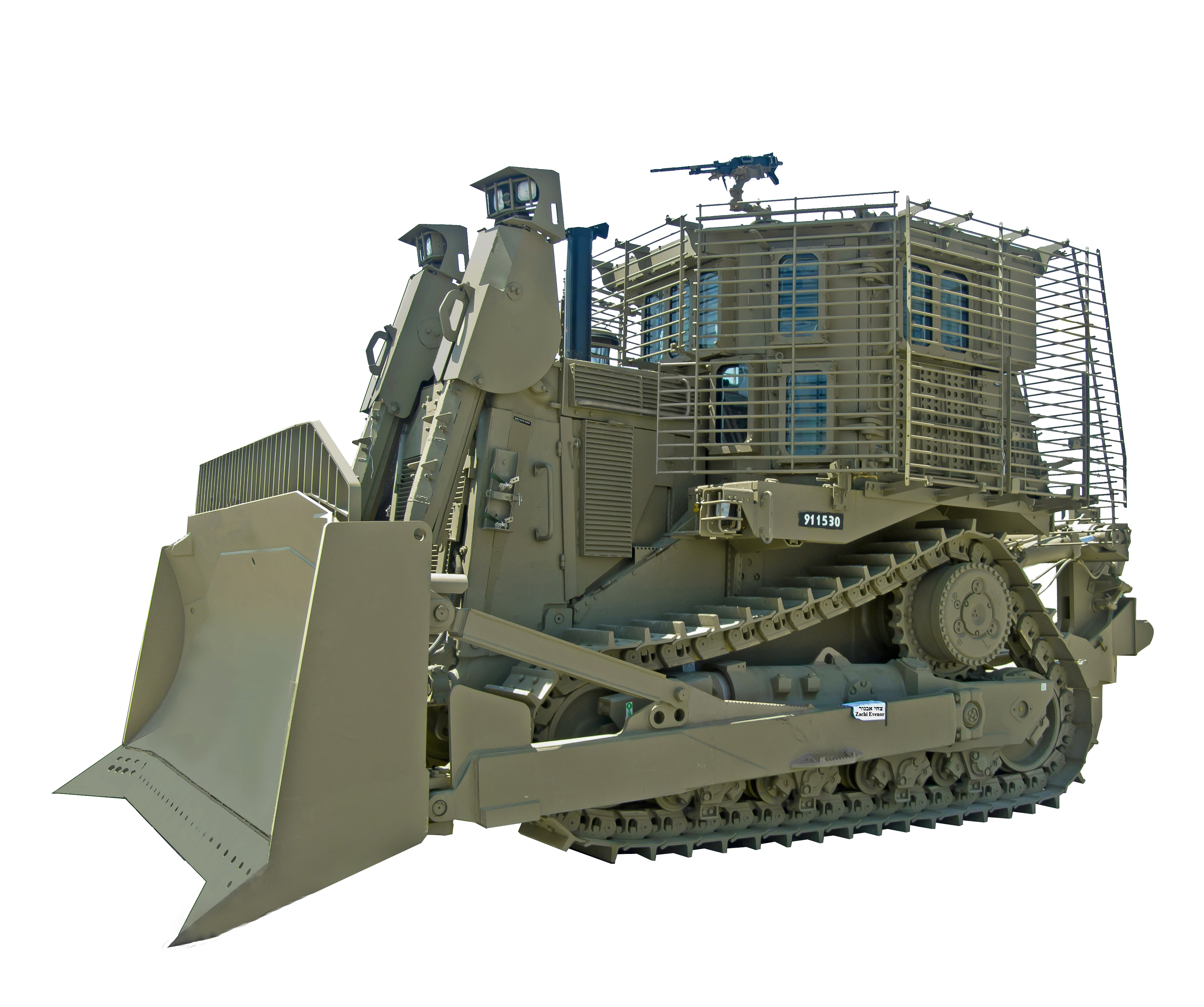
An IDF Caterpillar D9 armored bulldozer equipped with slat armor surrounding its driver's cab

Slat armor (or slat armour in British English), also known as bar armor, cage armor, and standoff armor, is a type of vehicle armor designed to protect against high-explosive anti-tank (HEAT) attacks, as used by anti-tank guided missiles (ATGMs) and rocket-propelled grenades (RPGs).

== Operation ==
Slat armor takes the form of a rigid slatted metal grid fitted around key sections of the vehicle, which disrupts the shaped charge of the warhead by either crushing it, preventing optimal detonation from occurring, or by damaging the fuzing mechanism, preventing detonation outright. Although slat armor is effective against incoming missiles, it does not offer complete protection – as many as 50% of missile impacts are unimpeded by the slat design. Slat armor is more likely to be effective if the spacing of the slats is less than the diameter of the incoming high-explosive anti-tank (HEAT) round, such as RPG rounds which are commonly 85 mm.

== Combat history ==
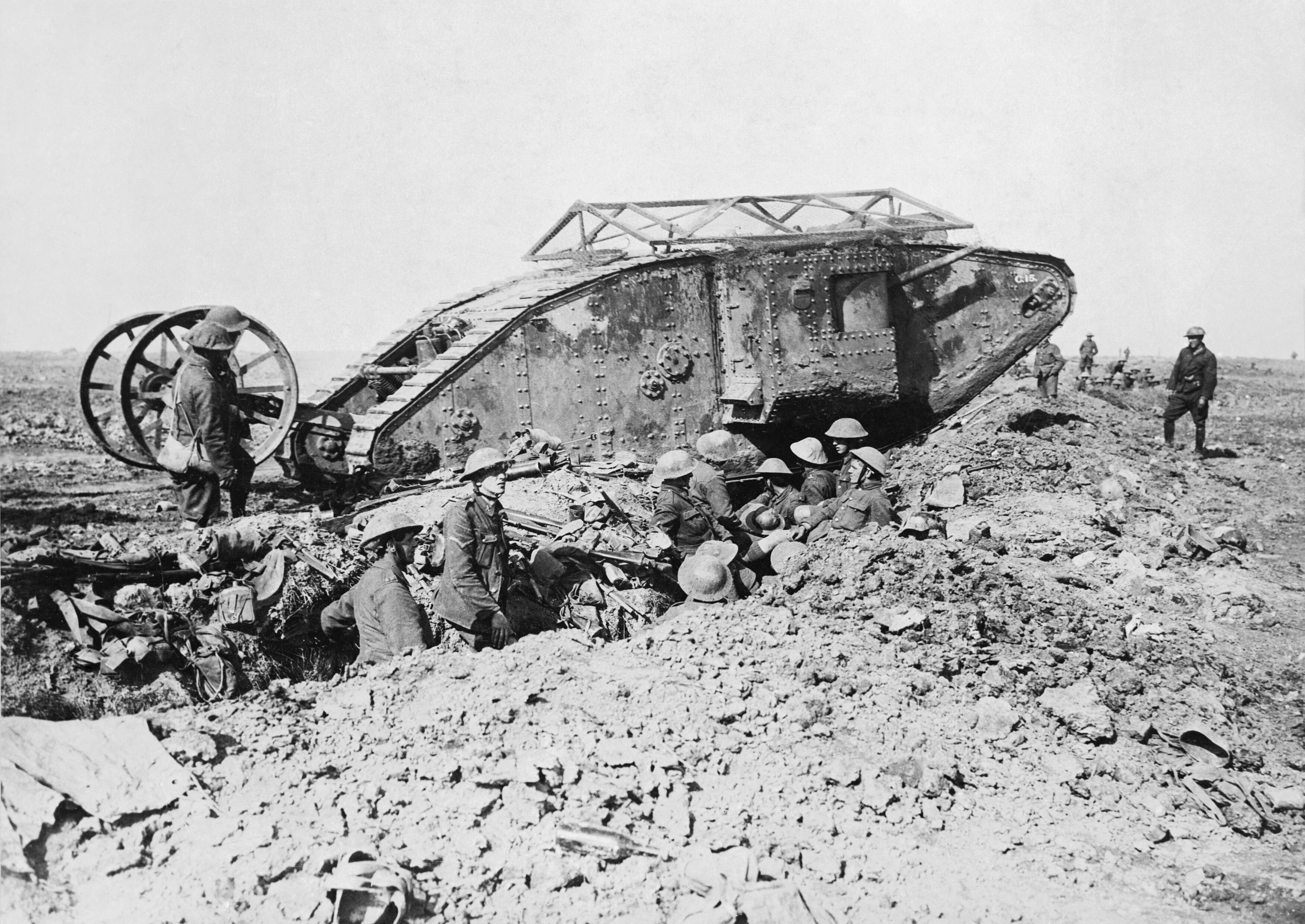
A model Mark I British tank with a "grenade shield" grid feature on top.

=== World War I ===
Some of the early models of British Mark I tanks were fitted with an external steel and wire "grenade shield" and steering tail. Both features were discarded in the subsequent models.

=== World War II ===
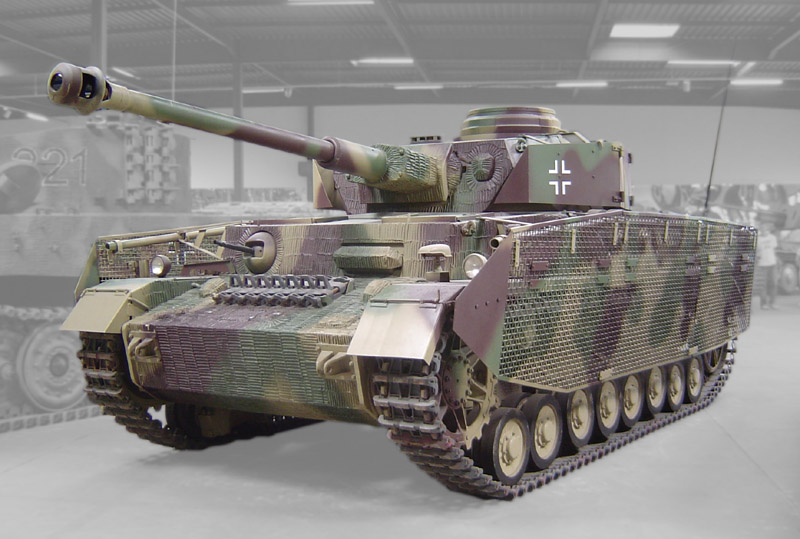
Panzer IV Ausf. H on display (with slat armor) at the Musée des Blindés in Saumur

The German Wehrmacht was the first employer of cage armor during World War II, using Drahtgeflecht-Schürzen (English: "wire mesh aprons") to fortify its tanks against shell fire. In March 1943, Adolf Hitler ordered all new Sturmgeschütz, Panzer III, IV, and Panthers be outfitted with Schürzen of either the wire mesh or steel plate type. However, the wire mesh was not as easy to mass-produce as steel plate Schürzen or armored skirts. Similarly, the Soviet Red Army tanks, when faced with the Panzerfaust, were outfitted with "bedspring" armor made from expanded metal mesh grating panels.

=== Cold War era ===
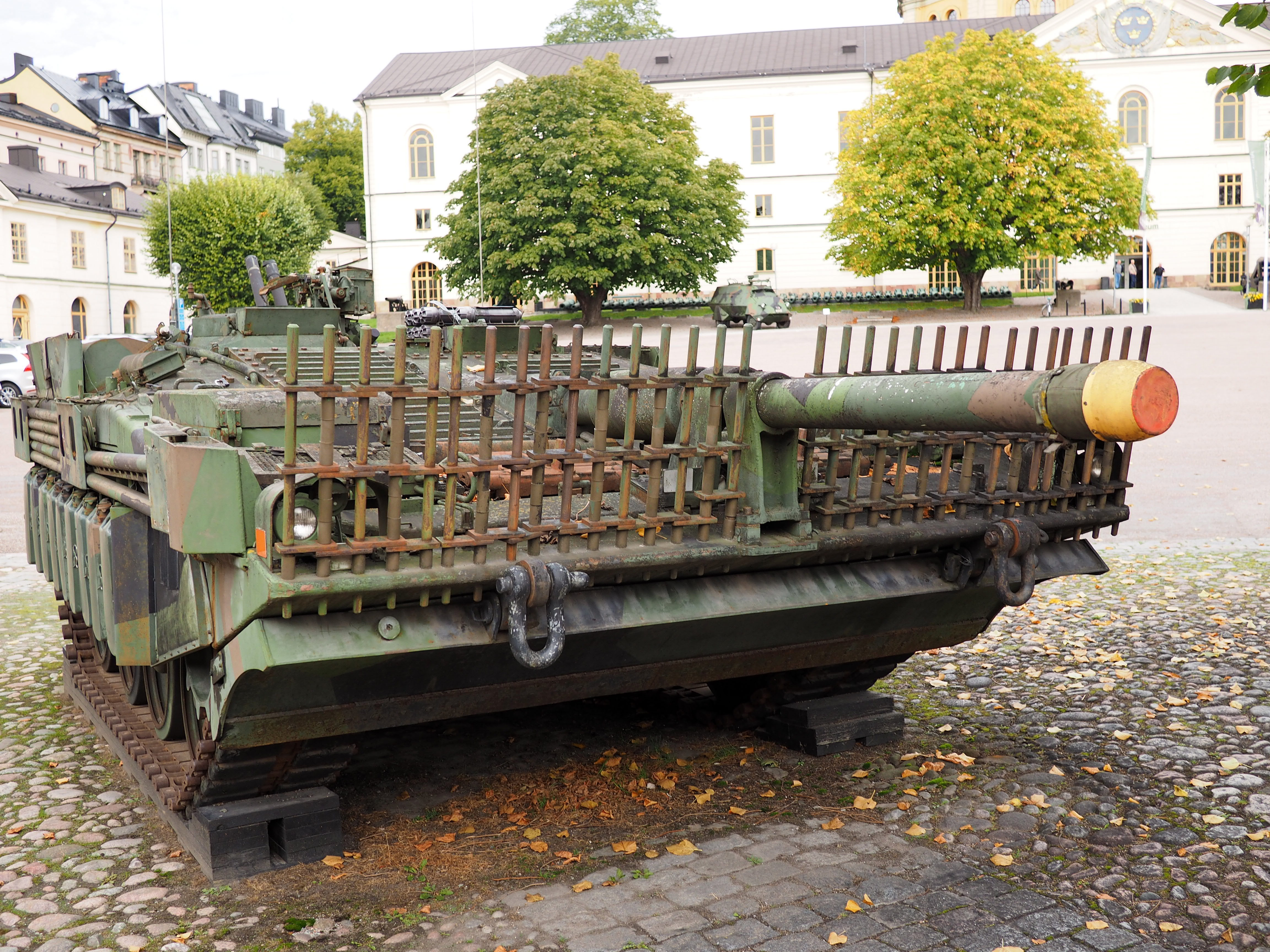
A 1960s Stridsvagn 103C tank at the Swedish Army Museum, Stockholm, with anti-high-explosive anti-tank fence armor on the front

In the Vietnam War, slat armor was commonly used on the sides of American patrol barges and boats. The CCB-18 is a surviving example of the Mobile Riverine Force which used such armor. Wire fencing was also placed on vehicles such as the M113 to defeat Vietcong RPGs. The Swedish Stridsvagn 103 of the same era employed a much heavier front-mounted metal grid to protect against incoming projectiles.

=== Modern era ===
In modern times, slat armor has seen use on the Israel Defense Forces (IDF) Caterpillar D9R armored bulldozer, the Force Protection Buffalo MPV MRAP vehicle, the General Dynamics Stryker, Ukrainian BTR-4, the Warrior infantry fighting vehicle, the M113 APC, the British Challenger 2, the Leopard 2A6 main battle tank, and Russian T-62 tanks. Slat armor is favored over traditional plate armor not only due to its effectiveness against shaped-charge warheads, but also due to its much lighter weight, which improves vehicle maneuverability.

Slat armor was first used on the Israeli IDF Caterpillar D9R armored bulldozer in 2005, and was installed in large numbers in 2006. Around the same time in 2005, slat armor was first proposed for the Stryker by a team of experts from the Army Research Laboratory (ARL), the Developmental Test Command, and the Aberdeen Test Center (ATC) to protect the vehicle from RPGs. Within seven days, the ARL and ATC designed and produced the first prototype, which was later mass-produced at the Lima Army Tank Plant in Ohio and implemented in different variants of the Stryker. The design of the slat armor has the cage placed 50 cm ahead around the vehicle, allowing an RPG warhead to explode at a safe distance. Also, the slat armor on the Stryker vehicles is reportedly effective against HEAT rounds.

In 2007, BAE Systems developed a very lightweight aluminum slat armor system named LROD, which was initially used on the Buffalo MPV, and which was claimed to weigh half the amount of comparable steel designs. BAE later equipped several US Army RG-31s with a variant of the LROD system, and also developed the system for its RG-33 vehicles, the Caiman and the JERRV. Slat armor is also fielded on the American M1 Abrams as part of the Tank Urban Survival Kit (TUSK) urban warfare series. In the Syrian Civil War, Islamic State of Iraq and the Levant (ISIS), the Free Syrian Army and Syrian Army equipped their armored vehicles with homemade slat armor to protect them from RPG impact.

In August 2016, Russia introduced bar-slat armor developed by NII Stali and Uralvagonzavod to increase protection of Russian armored vehicles against RPG and recoilless rifle HEAT rounds by 55-60%. The armor can be integrated with a variety of old-Soviet and Russian vehicles including the BTR-50, BTR-60, BTR-70, BTR-80/82, BTR-90, BMP-1, BMP-2, BMP-3, BRDM-2, BRDM-3, and T-14 Armata, with the full kit adding 1,000 kg (2,200 lb) of weight.

==== Top-mounting ====
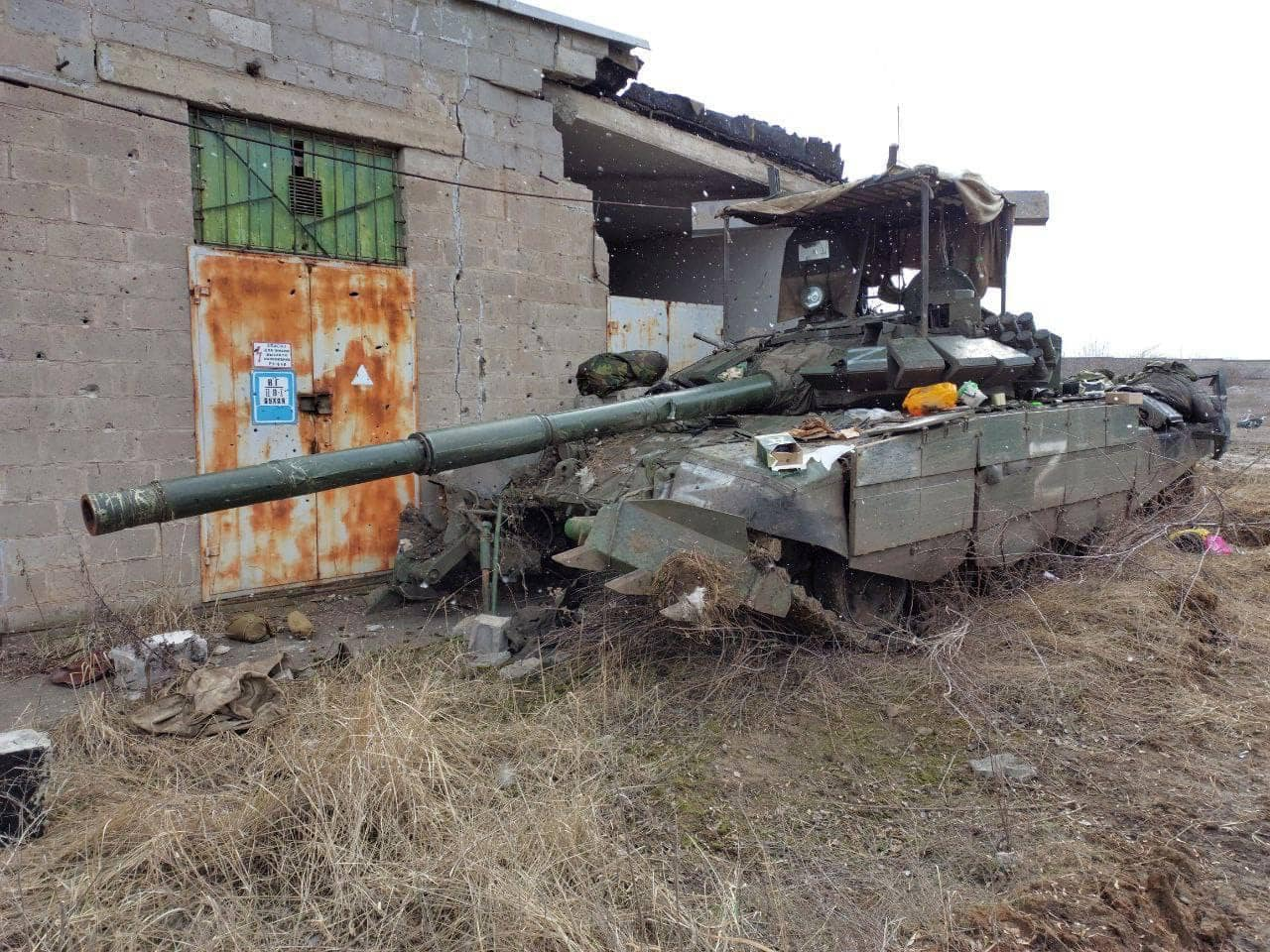
An abandoned and damaged Russian T-72B3M tank with improvised top-mounted slat armor during the 2022 Russian invasion of Ukraine at Mariupol

In 2021, various Russian tanks were observed with top-mounted improvised slat armor made from steel grilles; these were nicknamed kozyrek ot solntsa (Russian: козырек от солнца, lit. "sun visors") by Russian tank crews, and the Russian Ministry of Defense stated in mid-2021 that they were intended to enhance protection against "various weapons". In December 2021, the Ukrainian Army released video of a military exercise in which an armored fighting vehicle (apparently a BTR fitted with a T-64-like turret) carrying such equipment was destroyed by a Javelin missile. These implementations add weight to the tank, increase its visual profile, and make it more difficult for the crew to enter and exit the vehicle. In 2022, during the Russian invasion of Ukraine where they saw combat usage, they were pejoratively termed "cope cages" by English-language online communities, western military analysts, and British defence secretary, Ben Wallace, expressing skepticism over their real-world effectiveness, based on the assumption by these analysts that the armor was most likely designed in an attempt to mitigate the threat of top-down anti-tank missiles such as the FGM-148 Javelin, and other top-attack munitions.

Other analysts have proposed that they may instead be used as a countermeasure against HEAT warheads from weapons such as RPG-7s fired from above during urban combat, loitering munitions, or against drone attacks, as a response to lessons learned from the 2020 Nagorno-Karabakh war and First Chechen War. The lack of uniformity between the makeshift cage variants made from different meshes and iron fences suggest that they are largely improvised by the tank crews, and are not standard issue. In May 2022, it was reported in Russian media interviews with some Russian tankers that have returned from Ukraine that their crews eventually removed the cages, as they obstructed the use of machine guns and radios, and prevented timely evacuation if the tank caught fire. By Summer 2023, multiple Ukrainian tanks taking part in the 2023 Ukrainian counteroffensive have been spotted with various roof screens, including a Challenger 2, though instead of using slat armor most of them used netting as material.

On 16 October 2023, during the October 7 attacks, Israeli Merkava tanks were pictured being deployed with slat armor, likely in response following the loss of a Merkava from a PG7V warhead dropped from a quadcopter drone on 7 October. Hamas showed footage of at least two successful strikes against Merkava tanks using drones dropping IEDs and RPG warheads. However, some argue that because the slat armor only covers the turret, other parts of the tank are still left exposed.

On 21 March 2024, recent footage of the submarine Tula showed that it has been fitted with cage armor to prevent drone strikes, the first oceangoing asset to carry such a modification.

== Gallery ==
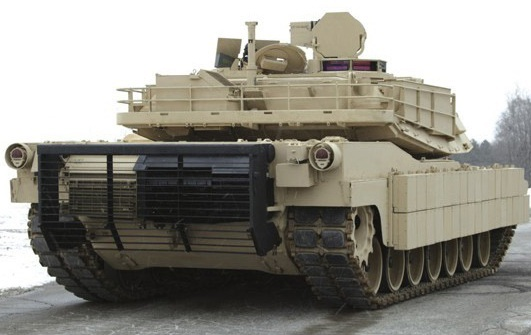
Slat armor protecting the engine exhaust port at the rear of the hull of an M1 Abrams

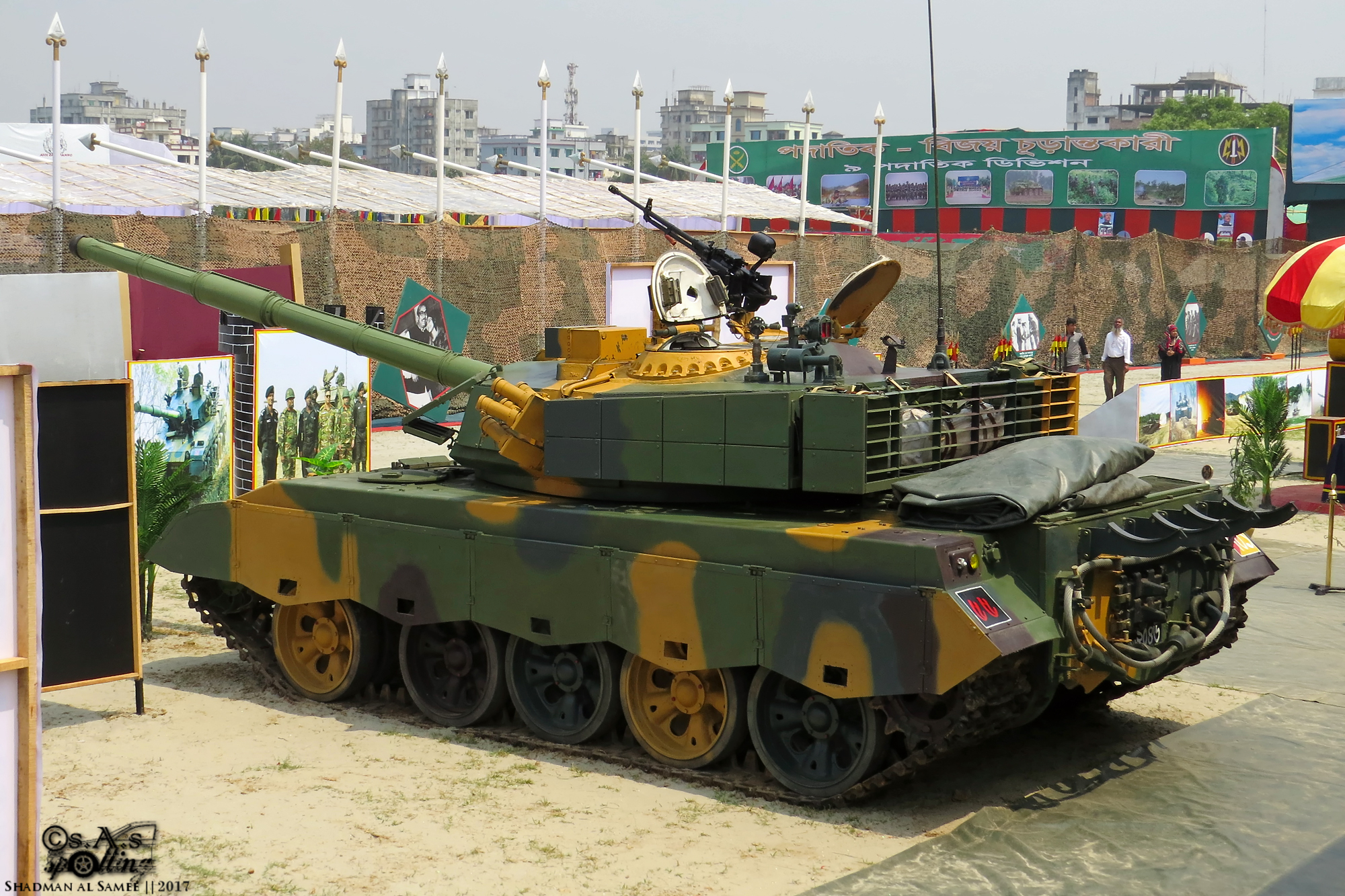
Slat armor protecting the rear of the turret of a Type 59G Durjoy tank

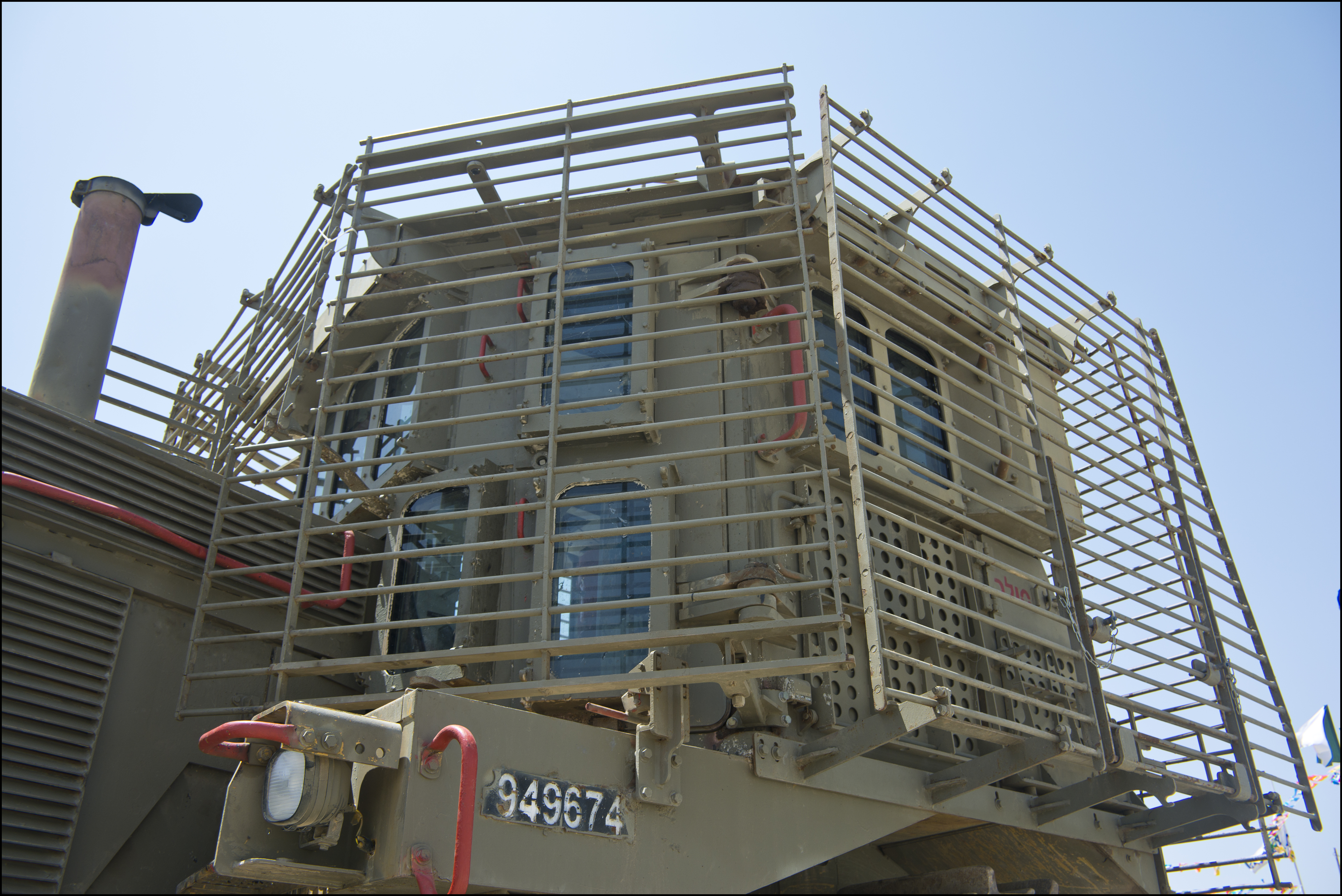
Slat armor of an IDF Caterpillar D9 armored bulldozer

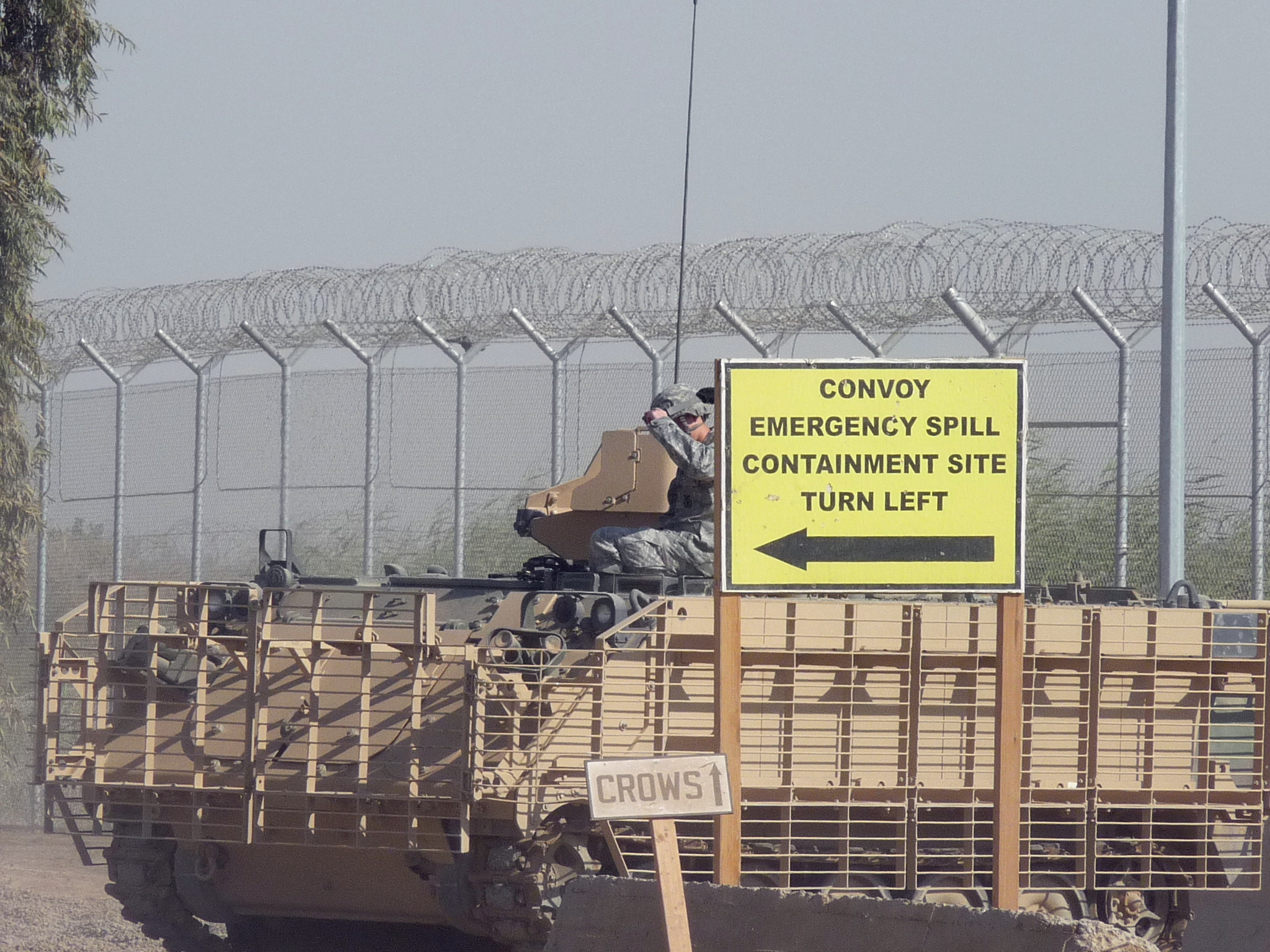
Slat armor on an upgraded M113 armored personnel carrier in 2008

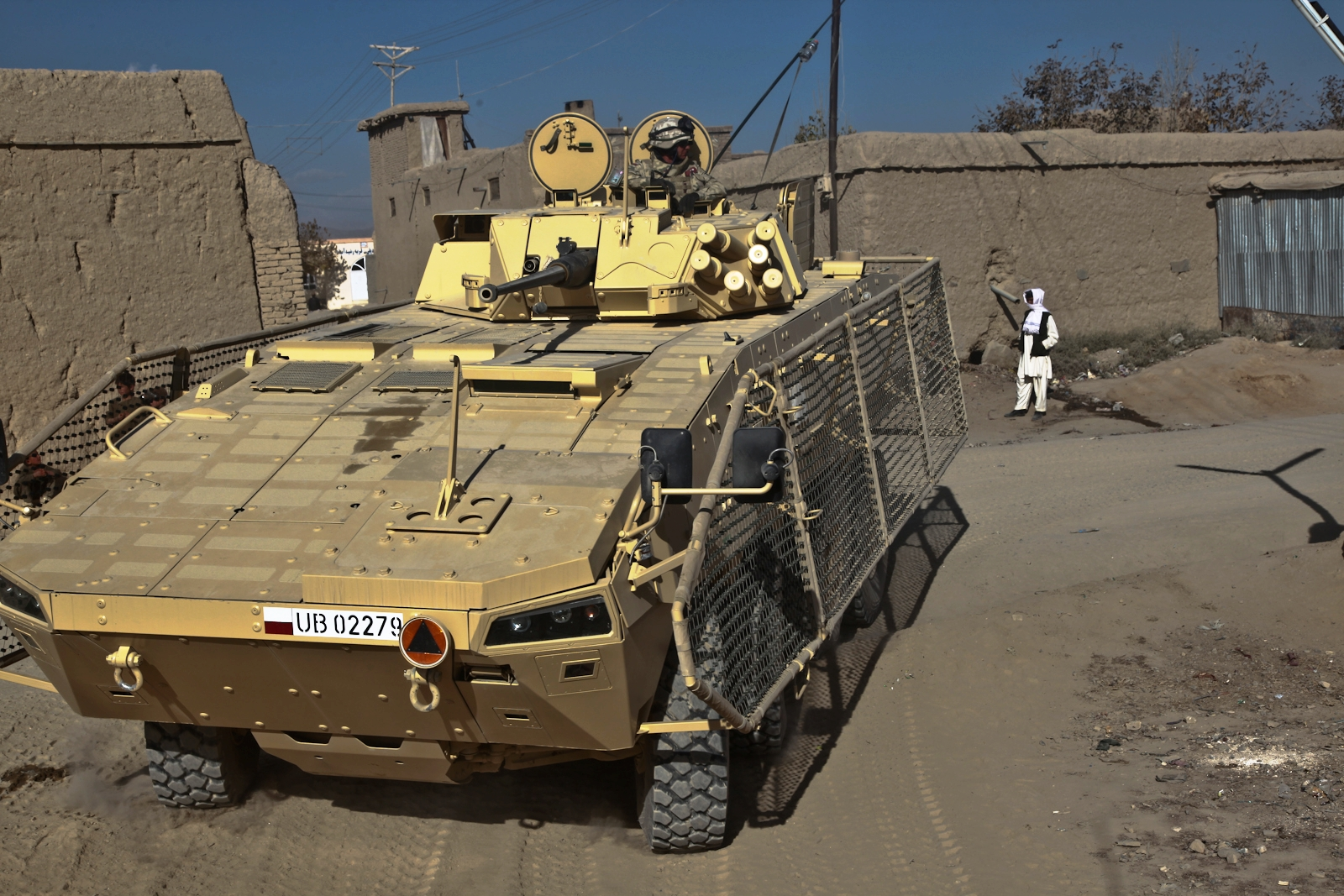
Lighter netting type fitted to a Polish KTO Rosomak in Afghanistan in 2010

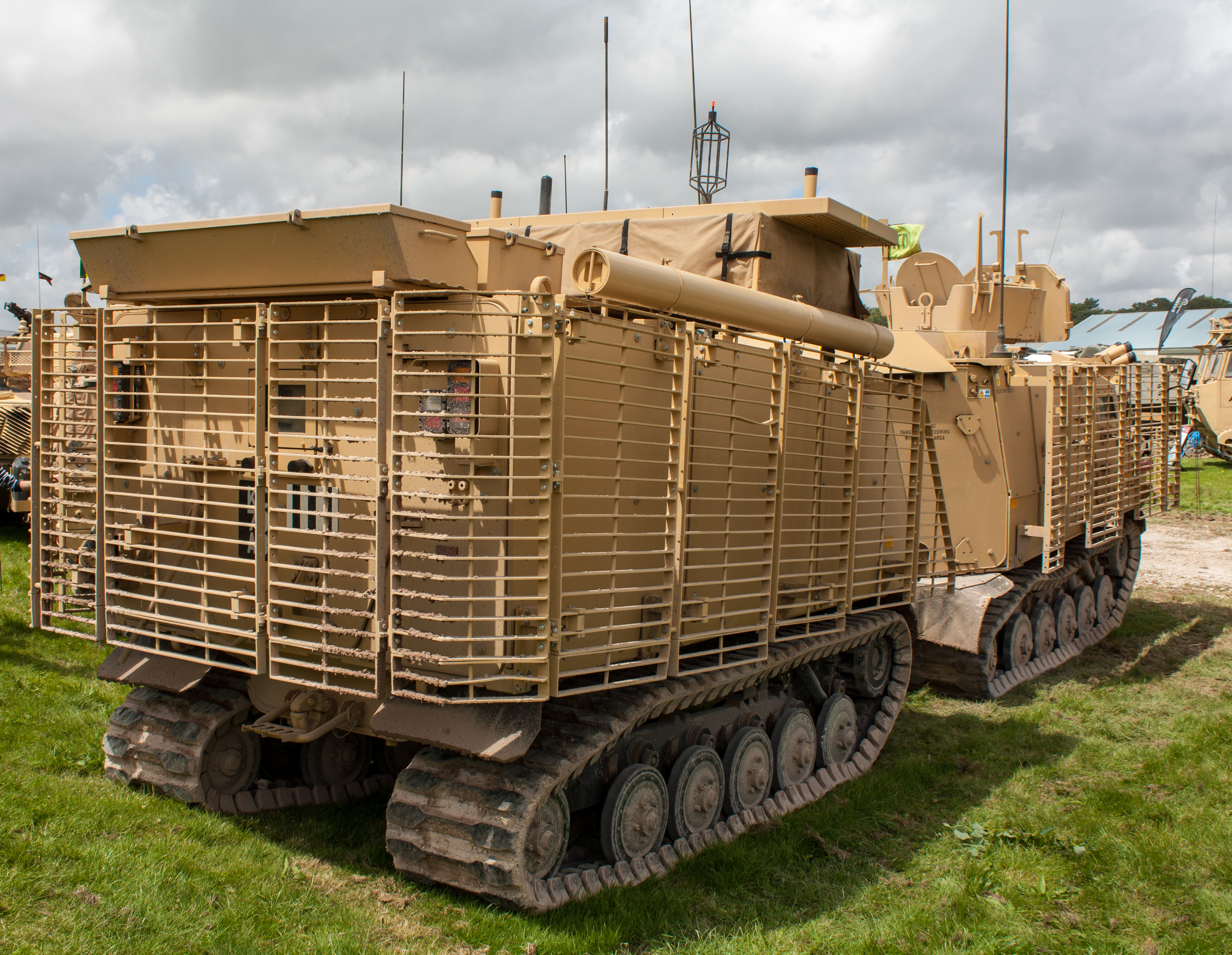
Slat armor on a WARTHOG ATTC in 2012

== See also ==
- Reactive armour
- Spaced armour
- Torpedo net
- V-hull
- Vehicle armour
- Turtle tank
- Anti-drone cage
- Cope cage
