= Anti-drone mesh =

Improvised armor developed during Russo-Ukrainian war

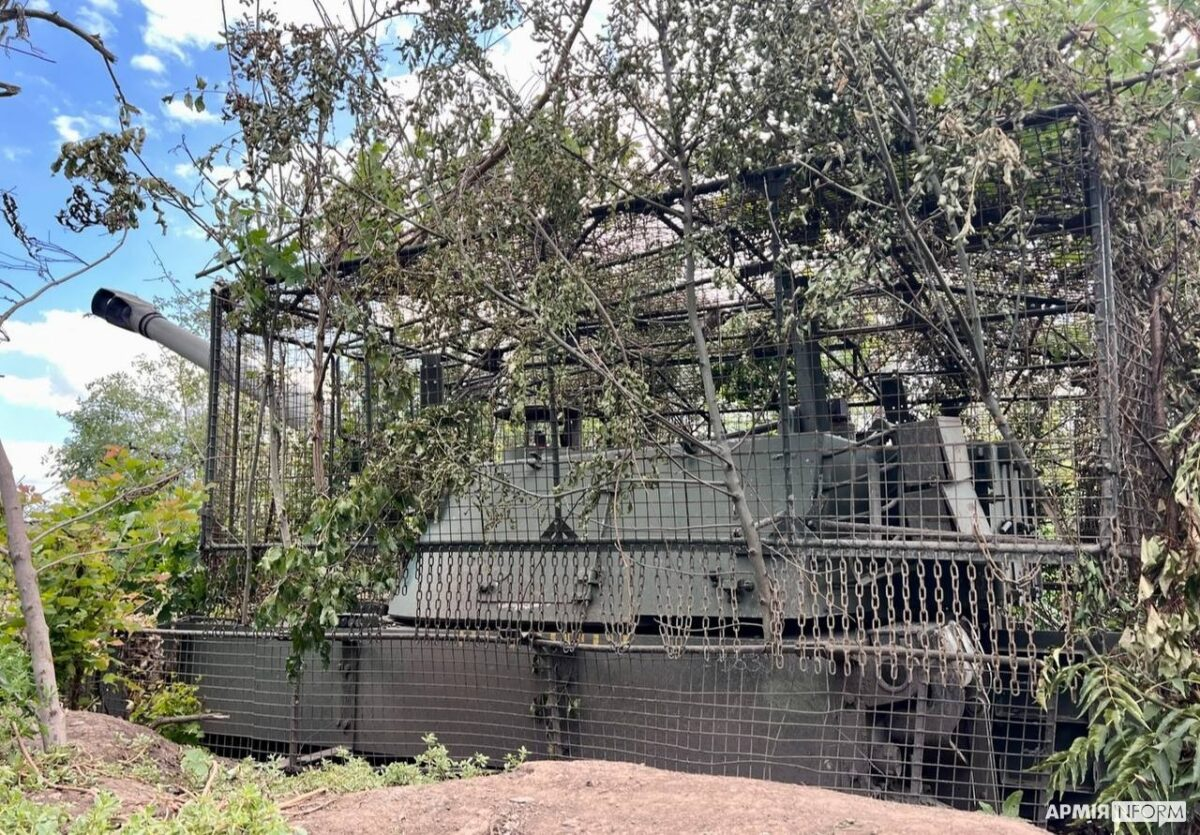
Ukrainian M109A4 with metal lattice protection

Anti-drone meshes (commonly nicknamed "barbecues" or "mangals" (Note: Ukrainian: мангали) in Russian and Ukrainian or "cope cages" in English) refer to metal lattices that surround ground military vehicles to provide additional protection from drone strikes, a practice which became widespread during the Russian invasion of Ukraine. Such protection uses a spaced armour approach, and is designed to induce the premature detonation or malfunction of incoming munitions.

== Description ==
=== Russian "barbecues" ===
In August 2021, Ukrainian sources first reported that Russian tanks were beginning to be equipped with special grilles (nicknamed "barbecues" or "mangals" by Ukrainian sources) welded onto their turrets. Tanks amassed by the Russian military for its invasion of Ukraine also frequently had these grilles. They were intended to protect the tank from attacks from above, which could be inflicted by Ukrainian-acquired Javelin anti-tank missile systems and Bayraktar TB2 combat drones. Ukrainian military media outlet Militarnyi considered their effectiveness in preventing Javelin strikes to be questionable, and noted they also hindered crew operations and increased the size of the tank's outline.

=== "Cope cages" ===
The anti-drone mesh was pejoratively referred to as "emotional support armour" or "cope cages" among online communities, as an expression of skepticism over their effectiveness.

=== Metal lattices ===
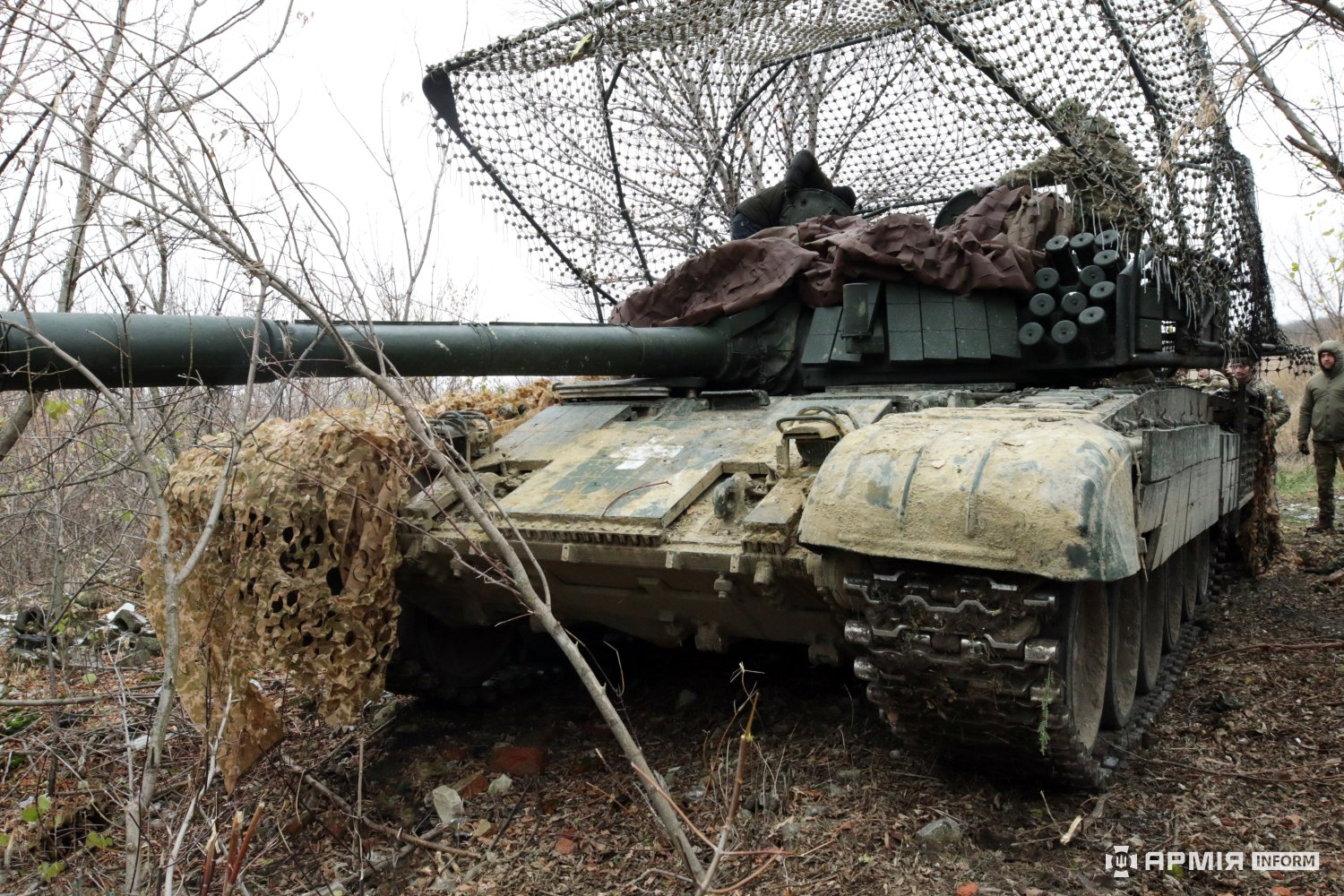
PT-91 tank with anti-drone metal mesh in the Ukrainian 117th Heavy Mechanized Brigade

With the beginning of the extremely widespread use of multirotor drones that drop ammunition and small, cheap barrage munitions, such as FPV drones and Russian Lancets by both sides of the war, there was a need to protect military equipment from such warfare. This was especially the case due to such drones frequently costing between several hundred dollars to several tens of thousands of dollars being able to destroy military equipment worth millions of dollars. One of the most common means of protection was a variety of nets and grilles to stop the fall of a free-falling munition, cause a premature explosion of the shaped charge of the drone, or prevent its detonation.

The simplest such protection developed was a metal net stretched over branches or a frame, not attached to the equipment and installed above firing positions or encampment. Several instances of equipment saved by simple netting during the war were reported.

More complex solutions involved welding nets or cages directly to the equipment. For example, the Russian "mangals", turned out to be effective at protecting equipment from small UAVs. Later, both the Russians and Ukrainians began to actively install lightweight metal fencing on their own equipment, including self-propelled artillery, tanks, and multiple rocket launchers. Metal nets have also been installed on Western military equipment transferred to Ukraine, such as the Challenger 2.

To circumvent the protection of the grids, it is possible to use remote detonation of a shaped charge. For example, in November 2023 Russian Lancets were able to attack Ukrainian equipment equipped with metal netting using lidar.

=== Tank sheds ===
In April 2024, Russians began using tanks with massive superstructures that covered them almost completely from above and on the sides. Some were equipped with electronic warfare and/or mine trawls. Ukrainian military and media mockingly dubbed these tanks ‘blyatmobiles’ (Блятьмобиль), ‘assault garages’ (штурмовые гаражи), and "turtle tanks", among others.

=== Dandelion ===
Between November 2025 and the start of 2026 Russia started fitting some of its vehicles with Одуванчик (oduvanchik, "dandelion") drone protection consisting of large numbers of branching glass fibre rods.

== Other countries and conflicts ==
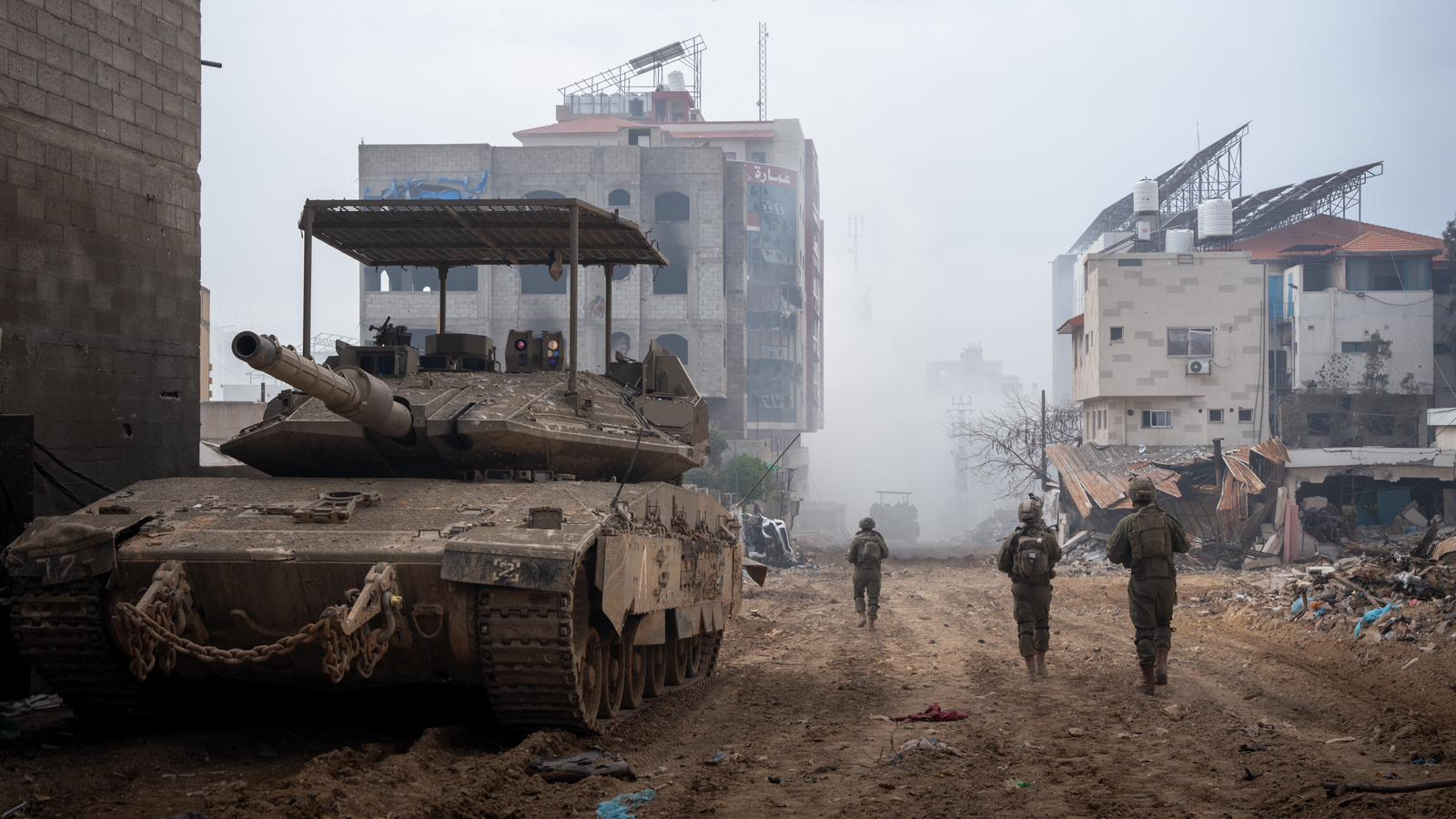
Israeli Merkava Barak with KAZ Meil Ruach and an anti-drone grille

Based on the experience of the Russian-Ukrainian war, anti-drone "mangals" have become widespread in other countries. For example, they were used on Merkava tanks used by Israeli troops during the Gaza war.

Similar solutions were also reported on Indian and Chinese military equipment.

On 21 January 2025, during DefenceIQ’s International Armoured Vehicles exhibition and conference, the British Defense Ministry announced that it was trialing Challenger 2 tanks equipped with anti-drone cages.

On 25 May 2025, the Japan Ground Self-Defense Force released images and footage showing Type 90 and Type 10 tanks of the 7th Division equipped with anti-drone cages.

== Other types of equipment ==
Several similar nets also appeared in September 2023 at Russian airfields after Ukrainian drone strikes to protect against them. Russia has also constructed anti-drone cages around oil tanks. In May 2026 i24NEWS published a photo that appeared to show anti-drone cages being built around fuel tanks at Dubai International Airport.

In March 2024, a "barbecue" installed on a Delta IV-class nuclear submarine was spotted near Gadzhiyevo. In May 2025 a Grachonok-class patrol boat was seen with anti-drone mesh covering the topside of the boat.

== See also ==
- Improvised vehicle armor
- Spaced armour
- Slat armor
