= Shashlik =

Form of shish kebab

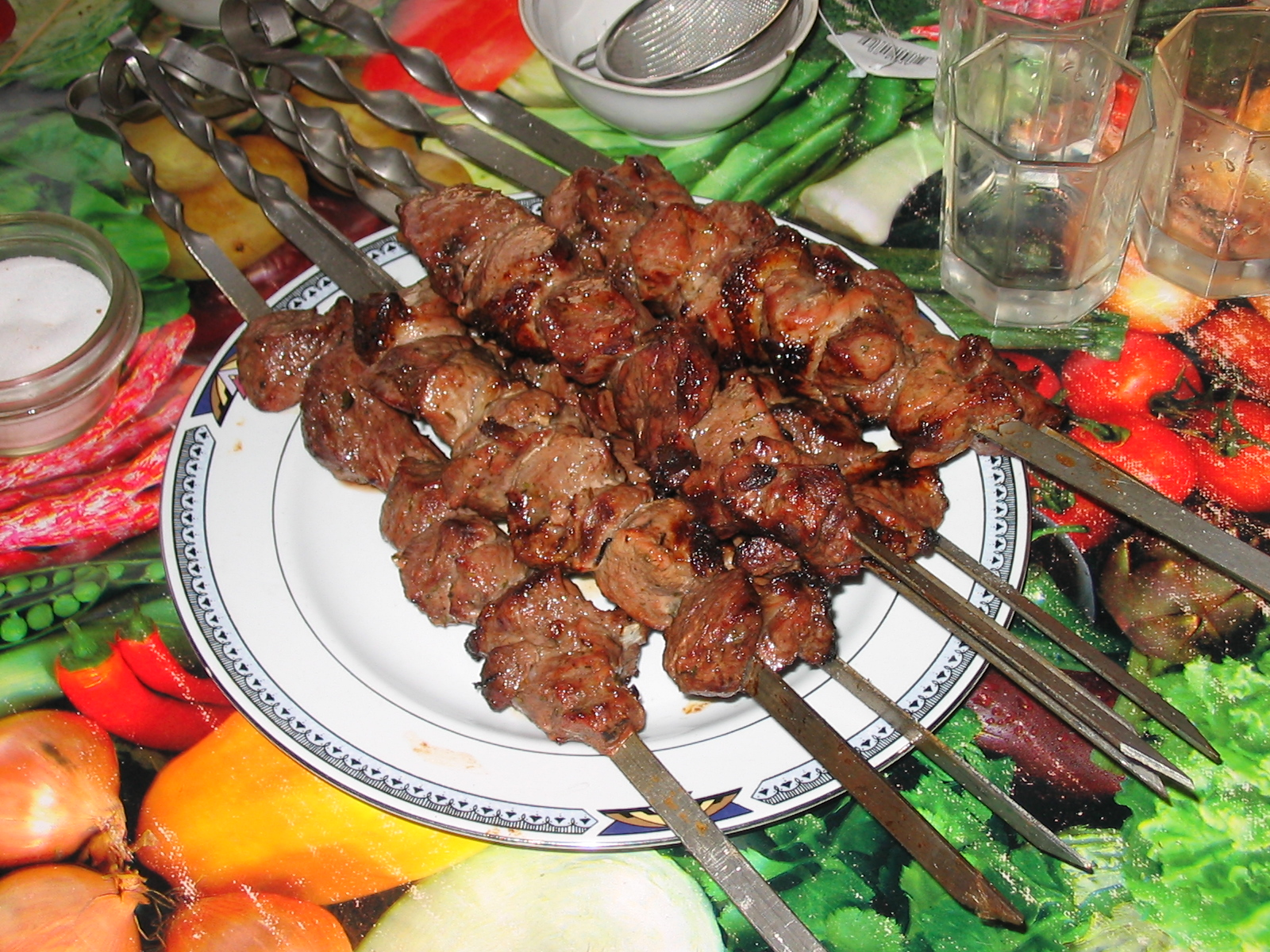
- Course: Main course
- Region or state: Russian Empire
- Serving temperature: Hot
- Main ingredients: Meat, marinade, onions

Shashlik, or shashlyck (Russian: шашлык, romanized: shashlyk), is a dish of skewered and grilled cubes of meat, similar to or synonymous with shish kebab. It is known traditionally by various other names in the Caucasus, Eastern Europe and Central Asia, and from the 19th century became popular as shashlik across much of the Russian Empire and later across much of the former Eastern Bloc.

== Etymology and history ==
Hungarian saslik served with chips, similar to the pre-existing Hungarian rablóhús

The word shashlik or shashlick entered English from the Russian shashlyk (шашлык), which is of Turkic origin. In Turkic languages, the word shish means 'skewer', and shishlik is literally translated as 'skewerable'. The word was coined from Crimean Tatar şış ('spit') by the Zaporozhian Cossacks and entered Russian in the 18th century, from there spreading to English and other European languages. Prior to that, the Russian name for meat cooked on a skewer was vertelnoye (вертельное), from vertel (вертел), 'spit'. Shashlik did not reach Moscow until the late 19th century. From then on, its popularity spread rapidly; by the 1910s it was a staple in St Petersburg restaurants, and by the 1920s it was already a pervasive street food all over urban Russia.

== Preparation ==
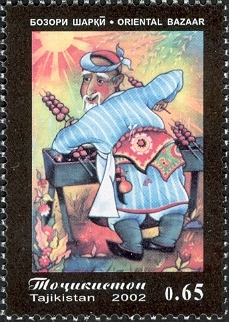
Postal stamp of Tajikistan "Oriental bazaar" displaying an old man grilling shashlik on a mangal

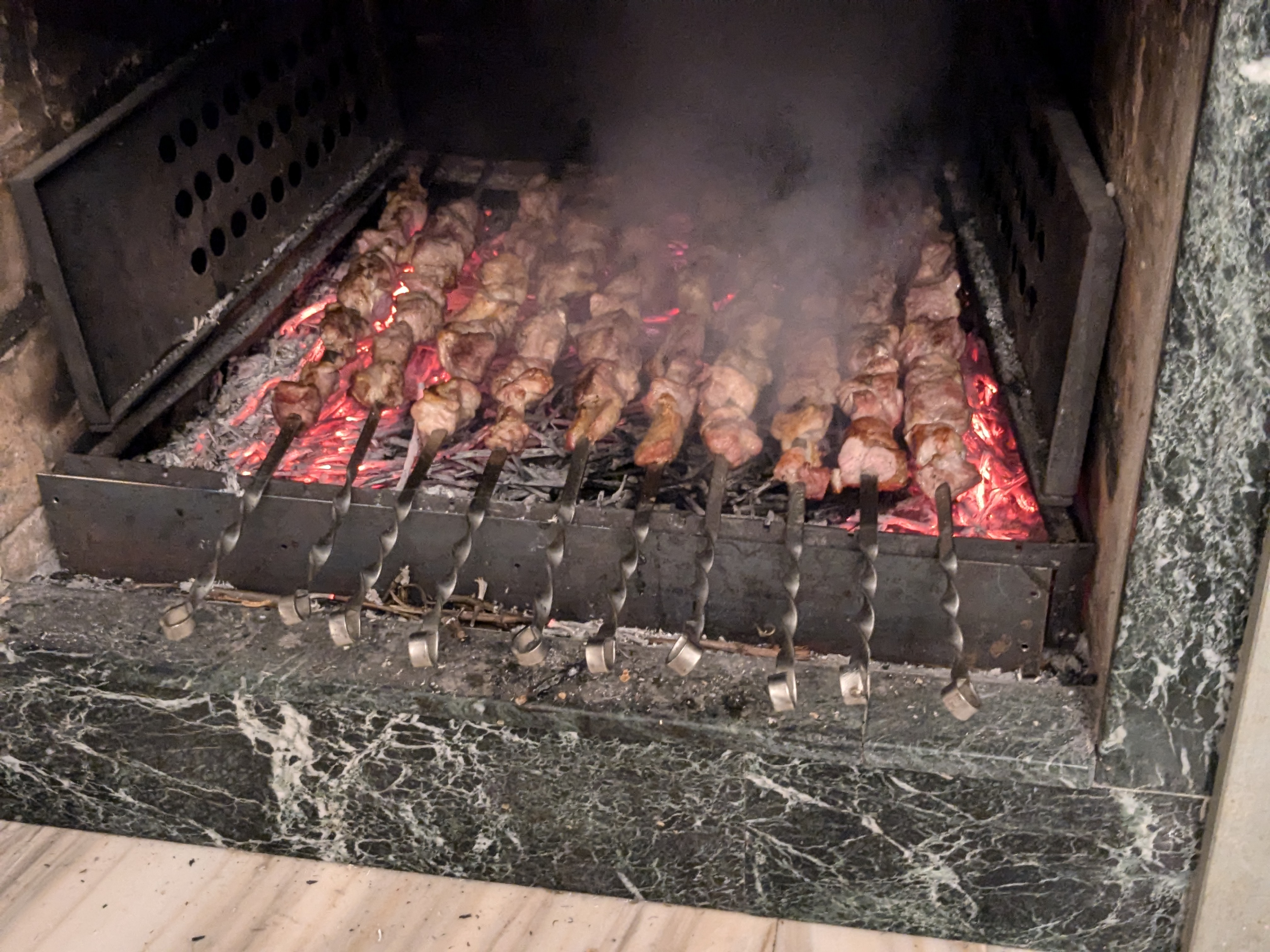
Shashlik preparing in a fireplace

Shashlik was originally made of lamb, but nowadays it is also made of pork, beef, chicken or venison, depending on local preferences and religious observances. The skewers are either threaded with meat only or with alternating pieces of meat, fat, and vegetables such as bell peppers, onions, mushrooms and tomatoes. In Iranian cuisine, meat for shashlik (as opposed to other forms of shish kebab) is usually in large chunks, while elsewhere it is typically prepared as medium-sized meat cubes, making it similar to a brochette. The meat is marinated overnight in a mostly acidic marinade, such as vinegar, dry wine, or sour fruit or vegetable juice with the addition of onions, garlic, herbs and other spices. Red grape wine is usually drunk with shashlik, but vodka and brandy are also often consumed.

While it is not unusual to see shashlik today listed on the menu of restaurants, it is more commonly sold in many areas in the form of fast food by street vendors who roast the skewers on a mangal over wood, charcoal, or coal. It is also cooked in outdoor environments during social gatherings, similarly to barbecue in English-speaking countries.

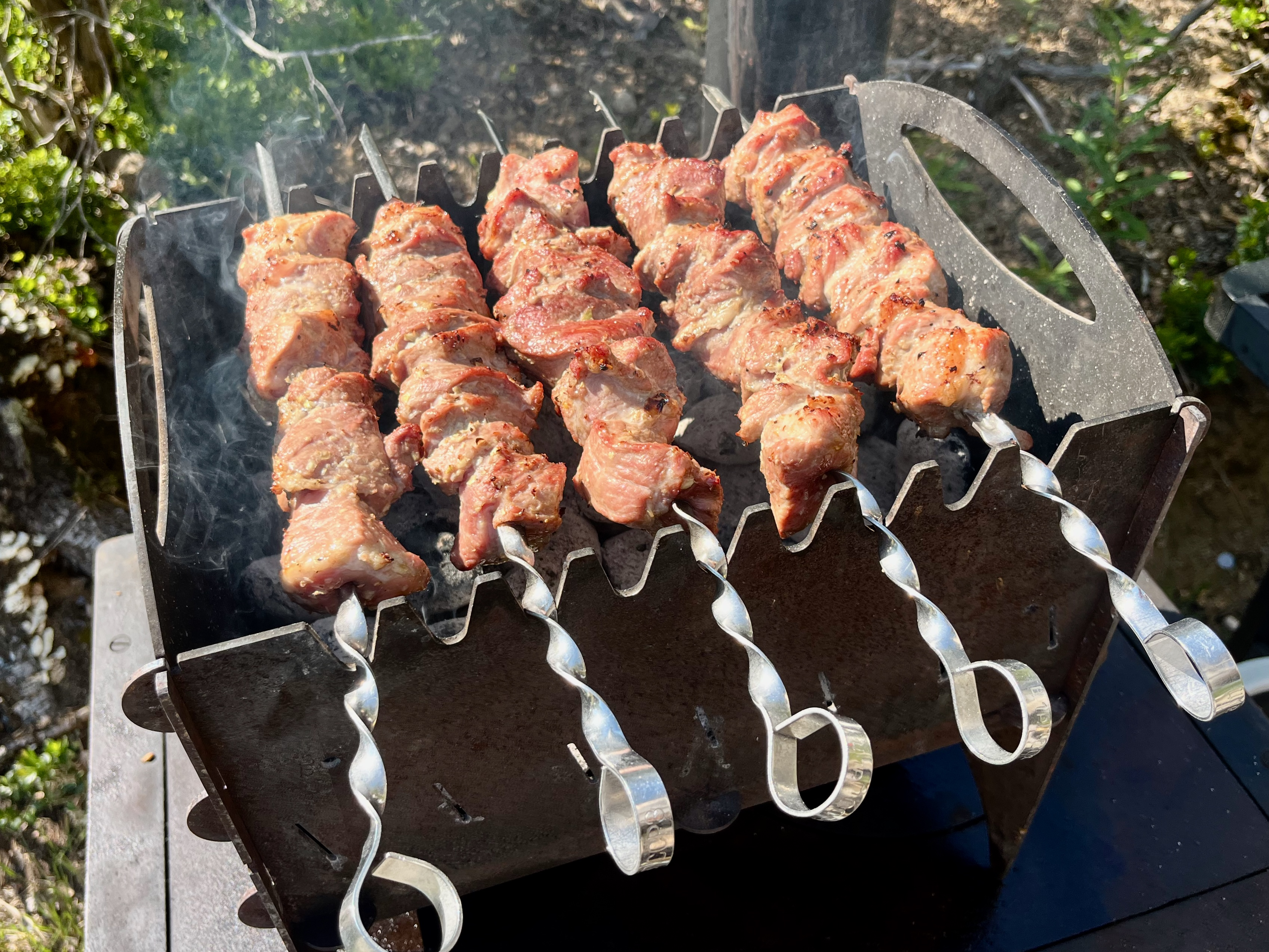
Shashlik made of pork

Despite the simplicity of preparing shashlik, the process of frying meat over an open fire can cause inconvenience for residents of apartment buildings.

== See also ==
- List of kebabs
- Chislic, a dish descended from shashlik eaten in South Dakota
- Chuan (food)
- Satay, a similar dish from Indonesia
- Yakitori, Japanese variety of skewered meat
