= KMT 5 M =

Tank mounted mine clearing device

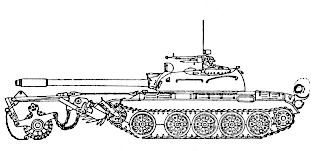
KMT-5M attached to T-54/55

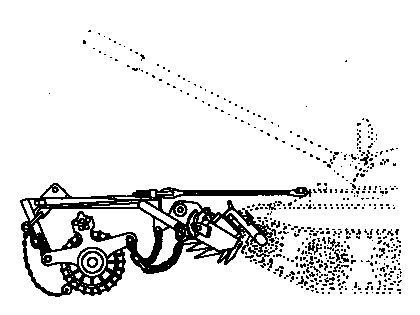
KMT-5M attachments to T-54/55

The KMT-5M is a Soviet tank mounted mechanical mine clearing device in the KMT series that is designed to disable anti-tank mines by plowing up or mechanically breaking them from the lines in front of tank tracks. It was first introduced in the 1960s. The device can be mounted to T-54/55, T-62 and T-64 tanks. The plow has nowadays been mostly replaced by the modern version KMT-7 that can be installed to T-72, T-80 and T-90 series of tanks. It was however recently copied by the Romanians in their D-5M mine clearing system.

The device features both an outer roller and an inner plow.

== Technical specifications ==
- Operating speed: 6–12 km/h
- Cleared lane width: 0.81 m x 2
- Depth of clearance: 0.1 m
- Install time: 30-45 min
- Removal time: 8-13 min
- Weight: 7.5 t (m)
