= Mangal (barbecue) =

Middle Eastern barbecue

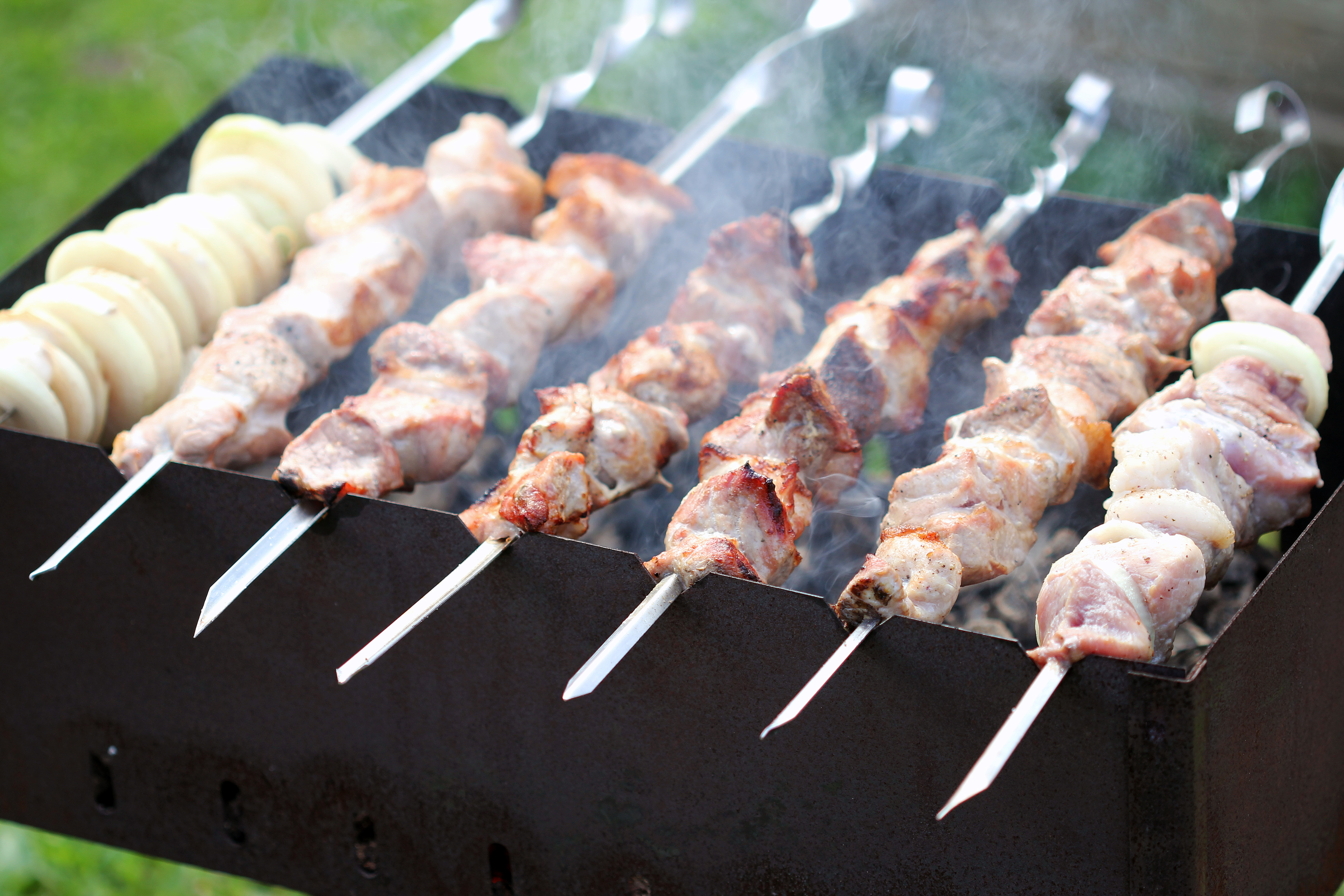
Meat prepared on a mangal

A mangal is the grilling apparatus on which foods are cooked in Middle Eastern barbecue.

== Etymology ==
The word mangal is derived from the Arabic word manqal (منقل) meaning "portable" and originally referred to portable heaters, or braziers, used by Bedouin to warm tents during the cold desert evenings. The Arabic word is thought to be a Greek loanword, μαγκάλι, meaning 'brazier'. The portability of heating equipment (as well as all other belongings) is vital for the Bedouins' nomadic lifestyle. Heating mangal are widely used in light climates where the ambient temperature does not drop too much. They are used as light indoor or outdoor heaters similar to stoves. Today, mangal-type heaters are still available either as camping equipment, functional furniture or decorative furniture.

== Description ==
A mangal is typically used to grill various cuts of meat, such as steak, hamburgers, kebab, shashlik, chicken wings and chicken breasts. Roasted vegetables, salads and other cold foods accompany the meal.

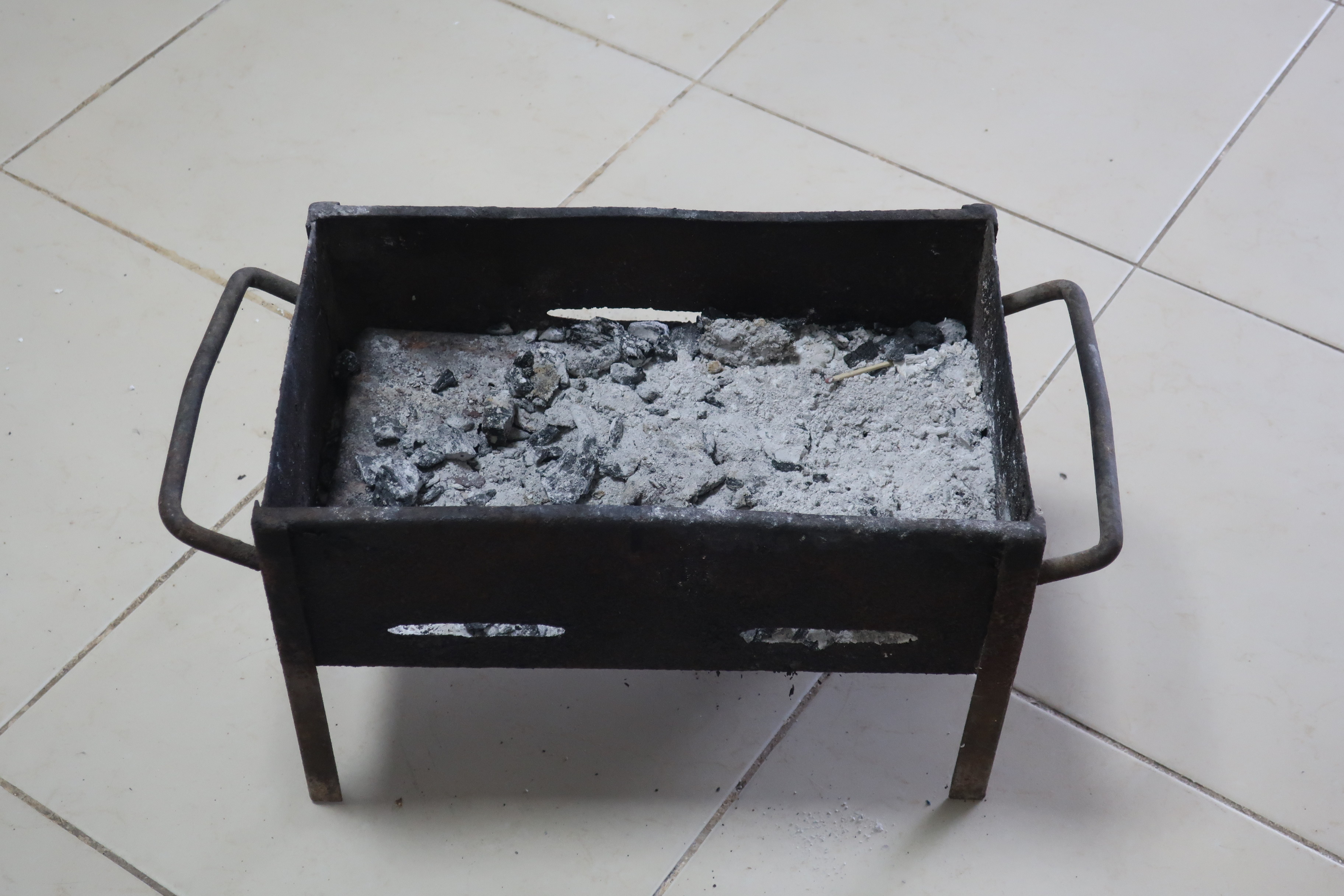
A metal brazier (mangal)

== See also ==
- Tsar mangal
