= Korean barbecue =

Regional style of food preparation

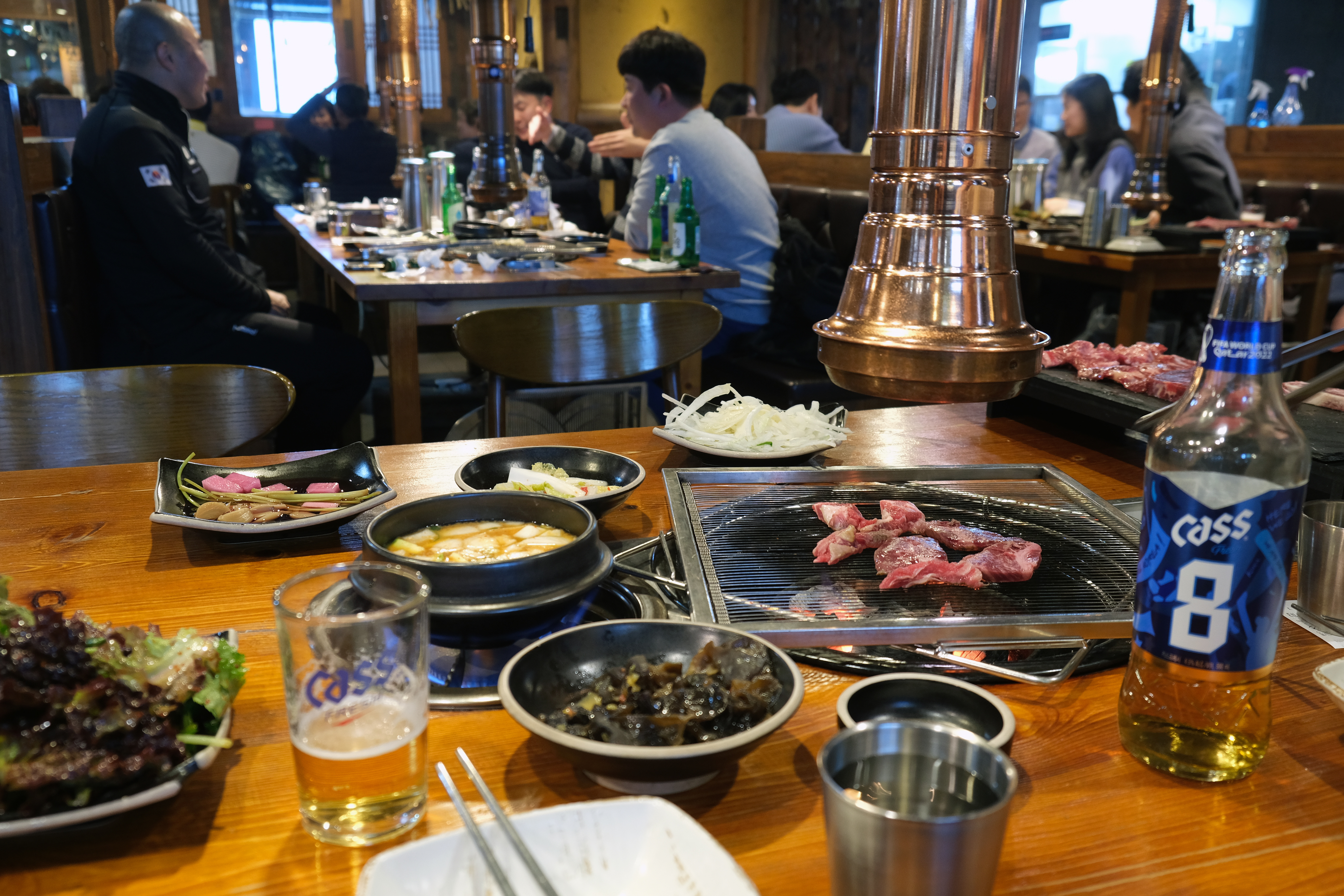
- Galbi

Korean name
- Hangul: 고기구이
- RR: gogigui
- MR: kogigui

Korean barbecue (Korean: 고기구이; lit. 'meat roast') is a popular method in Korean cuisine of grilling meat, typically beef, pork or chicken. Such dishes are often prepared on gas or charcoal grills built into the dining table itself, though some restaurants provide customers with portable stoves for diners to use at their tables. Alternatively, a chef uses a centrally displayed grill to prepare dishes that are made to order.

The most representative form of gogi-gui is bulgogi, usually made from thinly sliced marinated beef sirloin or tenderloin. Another popular form is galbi, made from marinated beef short ribs. However, gogi-gui also includes many other kinds of marinated and unmarinated meat dishes, and can be divided into several categories. Korean barbecue is popular in its home country. It gained its global popularity through Hallyu, more commonly known as the "Korean Wave", a term that describes the rise in popularity of Korean culture abroad during the 1990s and 2000s.

== History ==
Koreans enjoying grilled meat and alcohol in the 18th century

Maekjeok (Korean: 맥적; Hanja: 貊炙) from Goguryeo era (37 BCE–668 CE) is the oldest record related to Korean barbecue. During the Joseon period (1392–1897), roasted beef Neobiani was a favorite of the Joseon royal family.

Korean barbecue spread to Japan around the 1910–1945 Japanese colonial period. It was adapted to Japanese tastes, and now persists today as yakiniku.

In the Philippines, unlimited Korean barbecue chains like Samgyupsalamat became popular in the late 2010s, often serving samgyeopsal with unlimited rice and side dishes.

== Varieties ==
| Meat | Marinated | Unmarinated |
|---|---|---|
| Beef | Bulgogi (불고기); Galbi (갈비); Jumulleok (주물럭), short steaks marinated with sesame oil | Chadolbagi/chadolbaegi (차돌박이; 차돌백이), thinly sliced brisket point; Deungsim (등심), sirloin; Kkot deungsim (꽃등심), rib eye steak roll; Ansim (안심), beef tenderloin; Salchisal (살치살), chuck flap tail; Galbisal (갈비살), rib meat; Chae kkeut (채끝), strip loin; Buchaesal (부채살), top blade; Anchangsal (안창살), outside skirt steak; Chimasal yangji (치마살양지), flank steak |
| Pork | Dwaeji bulgogi (돼지불고기), spicy pork bulgogi; Dwaeji Galbi (돼지갈비), pork Galbi; Dwaeji Jumulleok (돼지주물럭), pork Jumulleok | Samgyeopsal (삼겹살), pork belly; Moksal (목살), pork shoulder; Dwaeji Kkeopdaegi (돼지껍데기), pork rind |
| Chicken | Dak galbi (닭갈비), spicy marinated chicken | Dak gui (닭구이), grilled chicken |
| Duck | Ori bulgogi (오리불고기), spicy duck bulgogi; Ori Jumulleok (오리주물럭), duck Jumulleok | Ori soguem gui (오리소금구이), grilled duck; Hunjae ori gui (훈제오리구이), smoked and grilled duck |

== Marinated barbecue meats ==
Bulgogi (불고기) is the most popular variety of Korean barbecue. Before cooking, the meat is marinated with a mixture of soy sauce, sugar, ginger, scallions, sesame oil, garlic and pepper. Pears are also traditionally used in the marinade to help tenderize the meat, but kiwi and pineapple have also been used more recently. It is traditionally cooked using gridirons or perforated dome griddles that sit on braziers, but pan cooking has become common as well.

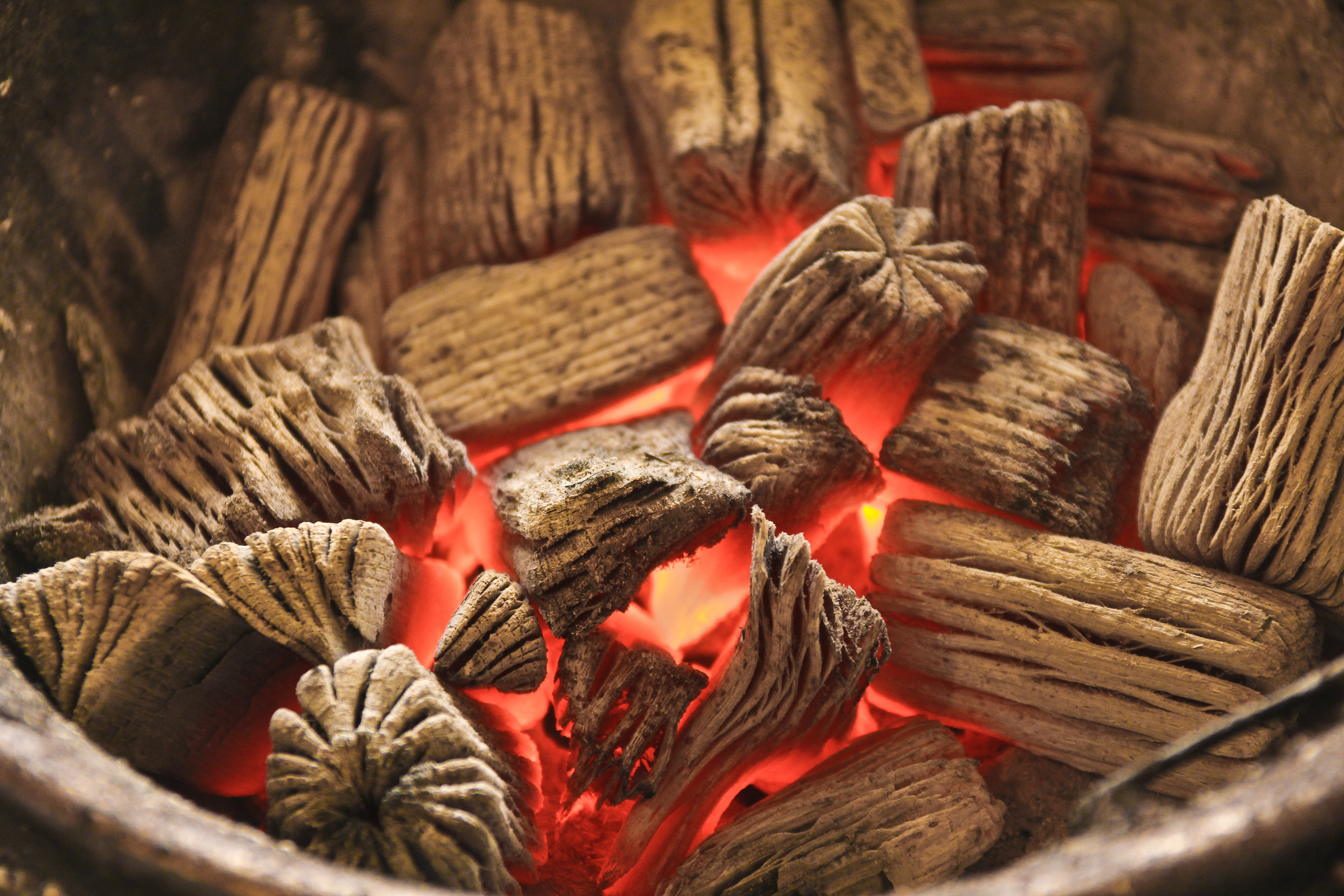
Sutbul (embers of charcoal) for barbecue

Galbi (갈비) is made with beef short ribs, marinated in a sauce that may contain mirin, soy sauce, water, garlic, brown sugar, sugar and sliced onions. It is believed to taste best when grilled with charcoal or soot (숯, burned wood chips).

Jumulleok (주물럭) is short steak marinated with sesame oil, salt and pepper. It is similar to unmarinated gogi-gui, distinguishing it from other kinds of meat by its steak-like juicy texture. Jumulleok is also commonly found with sliced duck instead of beef.

Dwaeji bulgogi (돼지불고기), or spicy pork, is also a popular gogigui dish. It is different from beef bulgogi in that the marinade is not soy sauce-based, but, instead, is marinated in sauces based on gochujang and/or gochu garu (Korean chili powder). The flavor is usually better when made with fattier cuts of pork, such as pork shoulder or pork belly.

== Un-marinated barbecue meats ==
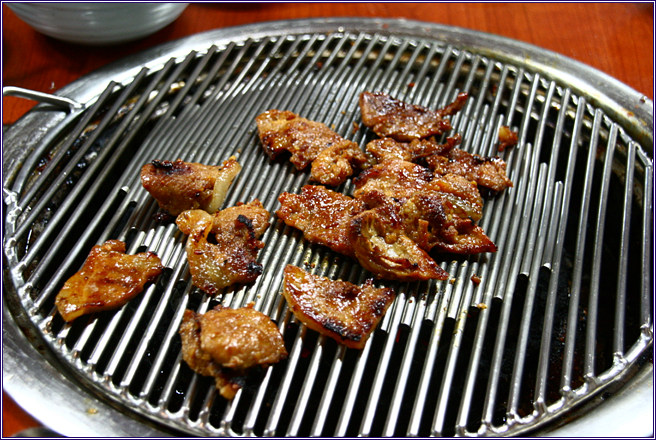
Korean barbecue-Galbi(rib)

Chadolbagi or chadolbaegi is a dish made from thinly sliced beef brisket, which is not marinated. It is so thin that it cooks nearly instantly as soon as it is dropped onto a heated pan.

Samgyeopsal is made of thicker strips of unsalted pork belly. It has fatty areas and is tender. In Korea, samgyeopsal is eaten more frequently than chadolbaegi due to the comparatively lower price of pork.

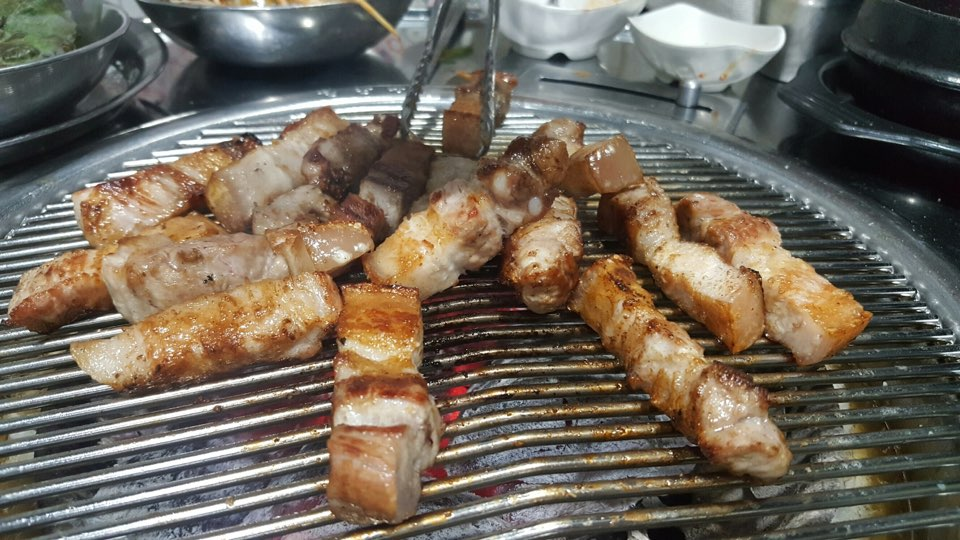
Korean barbeque-Samgyeopsal(pork belly)

Loins (deungsim, 등심) and boneless ribs (galbisal, 갈비살) are also a popular choice as an unmarinated type of gogigui.

== Side dishes ==
Gogi-gui comes with various banchan (side dishes). The most popular side dishes are rice and kimchi, and a green onion salad called pajeori and a fresh vegetable dish including lettuce, cucumbers, and peppers invariably accompany the meat dishes at restaurants. Other popular side dishes include the spinach side dish (sigeumchi namul/시금치나물), egg roll omelette (gyeran-mari/계란말이), spicy radish salad (mu saengchae/무생채), and a steamed egg soufflé (gyeran-jjim/계란찜). A popular way of eating Korean barbecue is to wrap the meat with lettuce and/or perilla leaves and add condiments such as pajeori (spicy scallion salad) and ssamjang (a spicy paste made of doenjang mixed with gochujang).

Korean barbecue is also popularly paired with alcoholic drinks, such as beer, soju, makgeolli, or wine.

== Gallery ==
Korean barbecue dishes
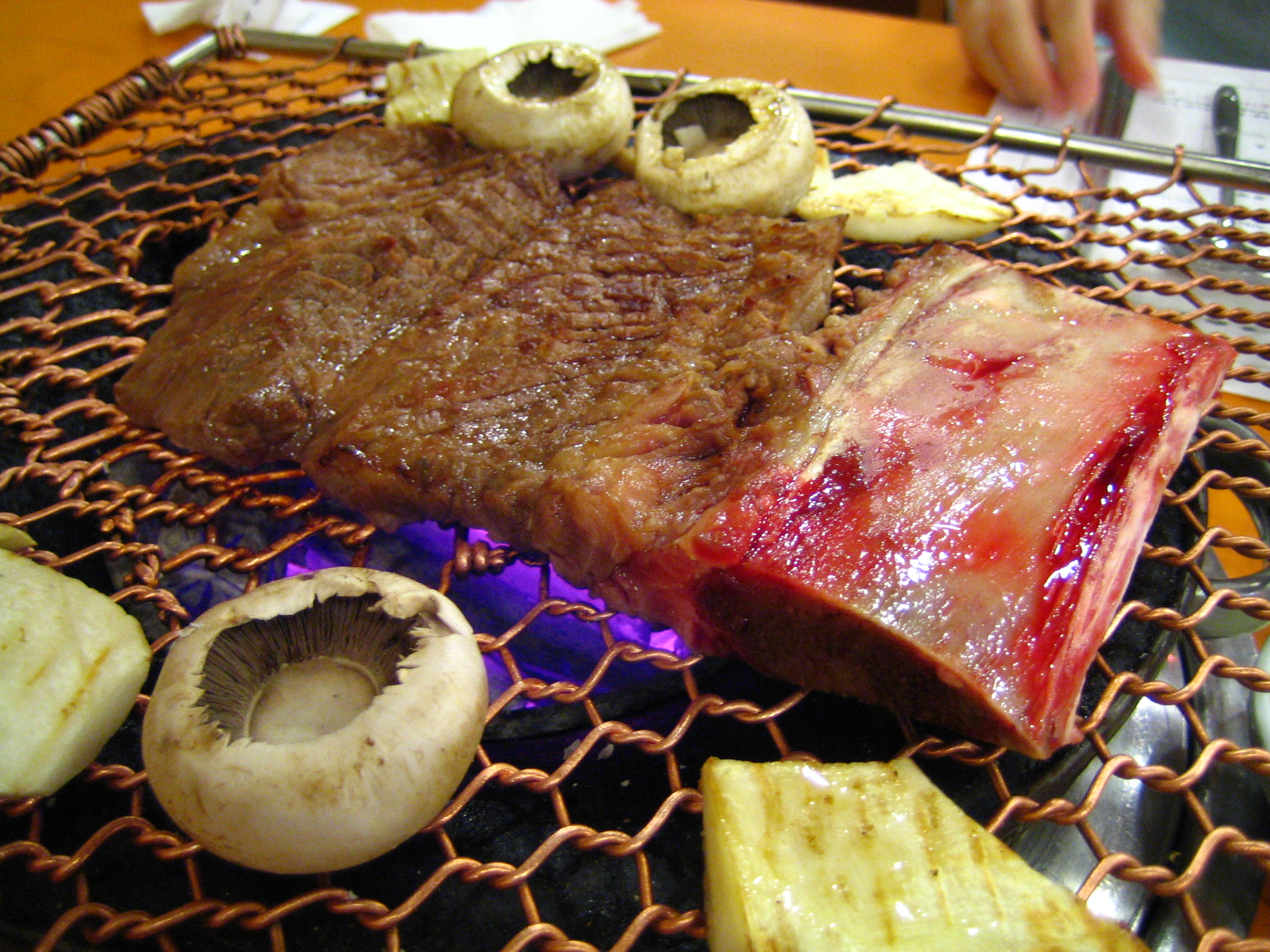
Galbi cooking

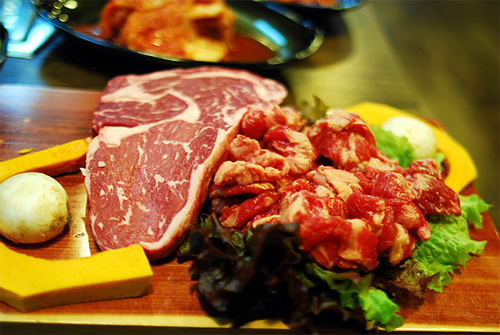
Fresh cut loins and boneless ribs

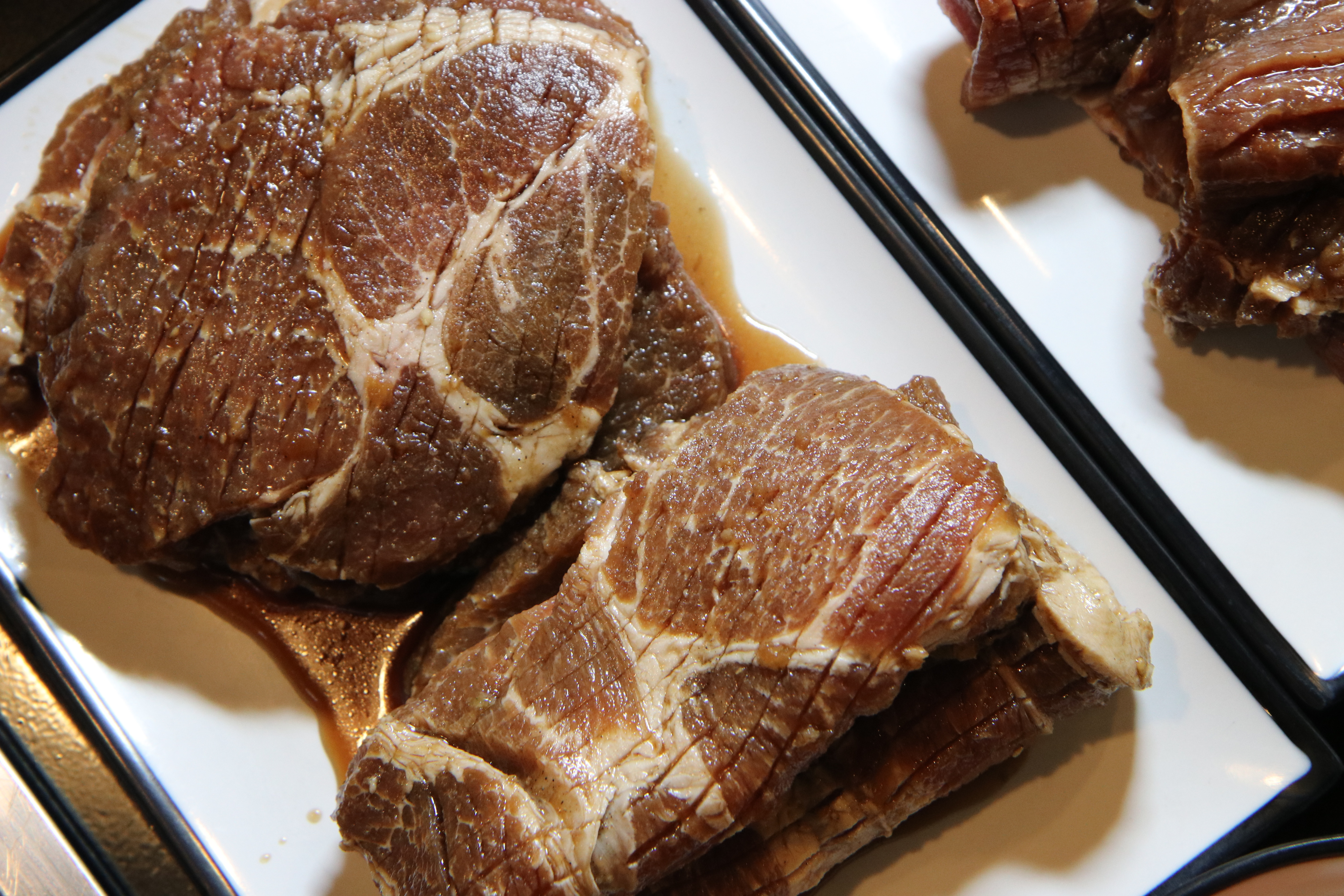
Marinated boneless galbi

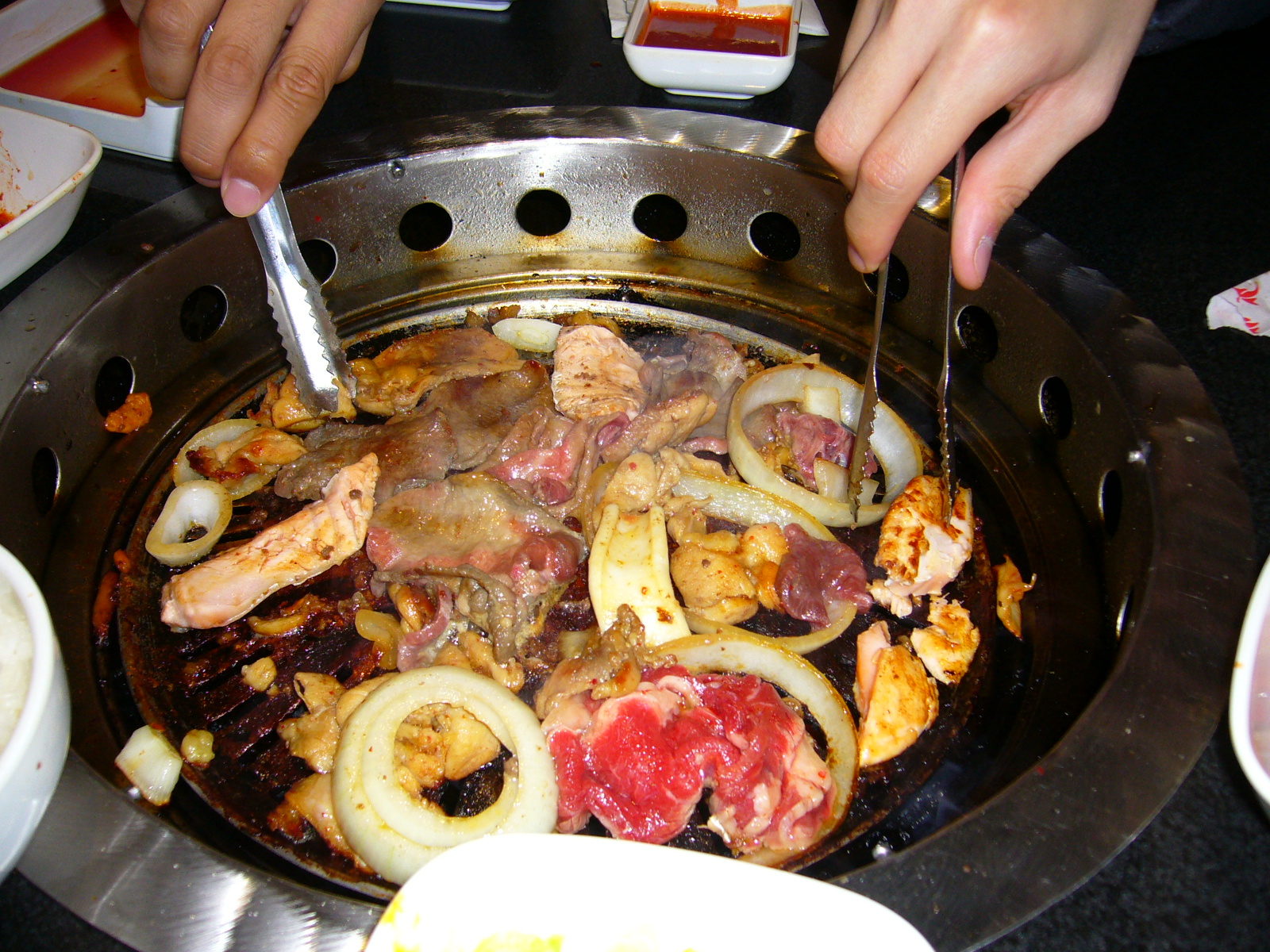
Korean barbecue

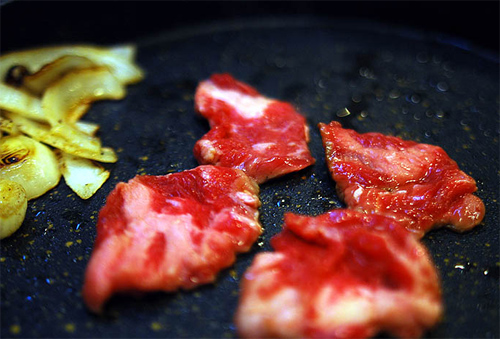
Galbisal, boneless ribs before cooking

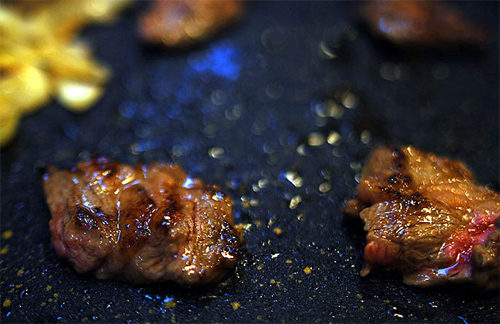
Barbecued galbisal after cooking

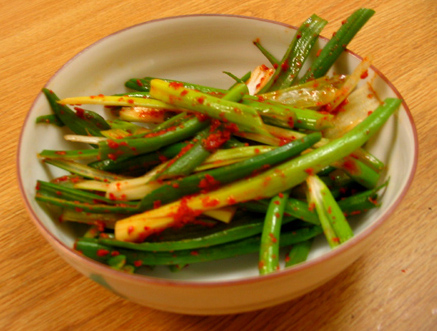
Pajeori (파절이), a banchan of spicy green onion salad

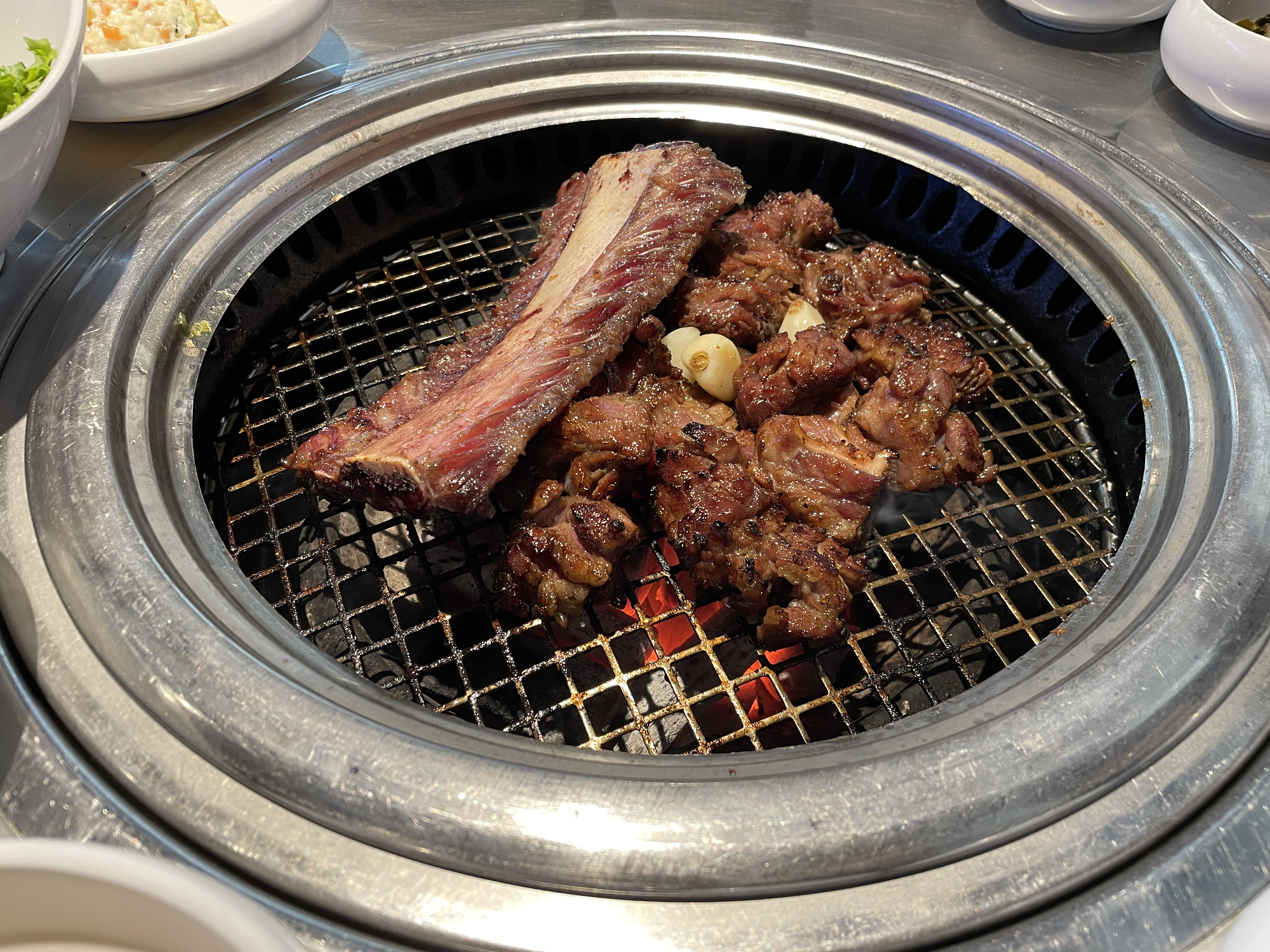
Korean Barbecue pork on the grill

== See also ==
- Asado
- Barbecue restaurant
- Jeok
- Korean cuisine
- Yakiniku
