= Jeok =

Skewered food in Korean cuisine

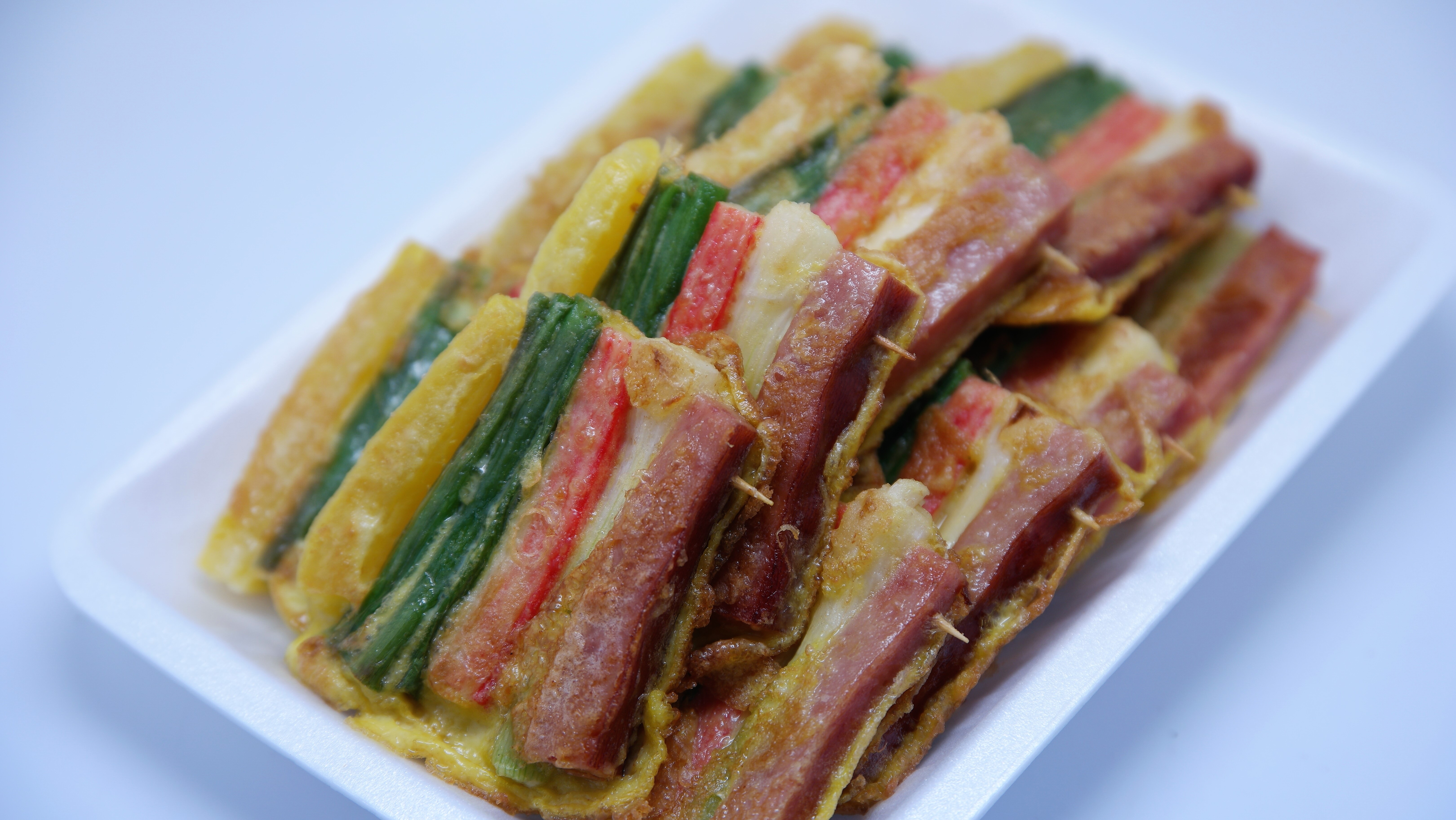
- Jijim-nureum-jeok (egg-washed and pan-fried skewers)
- Place of origin: Korea

Korean name
- Hangul: 적
- Hanja: 炙
- RR: jeok
- MR: chŏk
- IPA: tɕʌk̚

Jeok, also spelled as Chok (Korean: 적; Hanja: 炙) is a Korean meat dish served with skewers. Jeok is typically made with a large variety of meats, vegetables and mushrooms and is usually served on special occasions such as birthdays (hwangap) and wedding ceremonies. Jeok comes in multiple varieties, including sanjeok and nureum-jeok.

== Origin ==
Jeok is from maekjeok (맥적; 貊炙). It is discussed in the book In Search of the Supernatural (搜神記) written during the Jin dynasty of China. In a letter, maek (貊) refers to the Yemaek people, the tribe believed to be the ancestors of modern Koreans. The book says "Qiang simmered dish and Yemaek roast are barbarian's foods. Since the beginning of China, they are prized by nobles and rich people" (羌煮,貊炙,翟之食也。自太始以來,中國尚之。貴人,富室,必留其器) where Yemaek roast is maekjeok. According to another record Shiming (釋名), "Maekjeok is a whole pig that is barbecued, from which pieces of meat are sliced off by each individual participating in the meal. It derives from Yemaek." (貊炙,全體炙之,各自以刀割,出於胡貊之為也)

While the ancient descriptions of maekjeok are different from bulgogi, some theorize that maekjeok ultimately evolved to modern day bulgogi.

Outside of the nobility, ordinary people also enjoyed jeok and similar grilled dishes without skewers, such as bulgogi and galbi.

== Variety ==
Depending on the ingredients and preparation methods, the exact names become sanjeok, nureum-jeok(누름적), along other variations. The three main categories of jeok are fish, vegetable and meat.

Vegetables served with jeok include spring onions, carrots, broad bell flowers and most notably, mushrooms. These are foods that are widely found available in the local areas where the cuisine first became popular. As jeok consists of several ingredients, from vegetables to meat, the dish has a high nutritional balance and unlike many Korean dishes, does not include rice.

== See also ==
- Kkochi
- Sanjeok

== Notes ==
- (Korean) Jeon Sung Hee, 2008, Jeon 50(전50)
- (Korean) Han Chun Seop, Lee Soon ok, 2012, Nutritional balanced food made of mushroom
- (Korean) Jeon Sung Hee, 2008, Jeon 50(전50)
