= Maekjeok =

Korean skewered pork dish

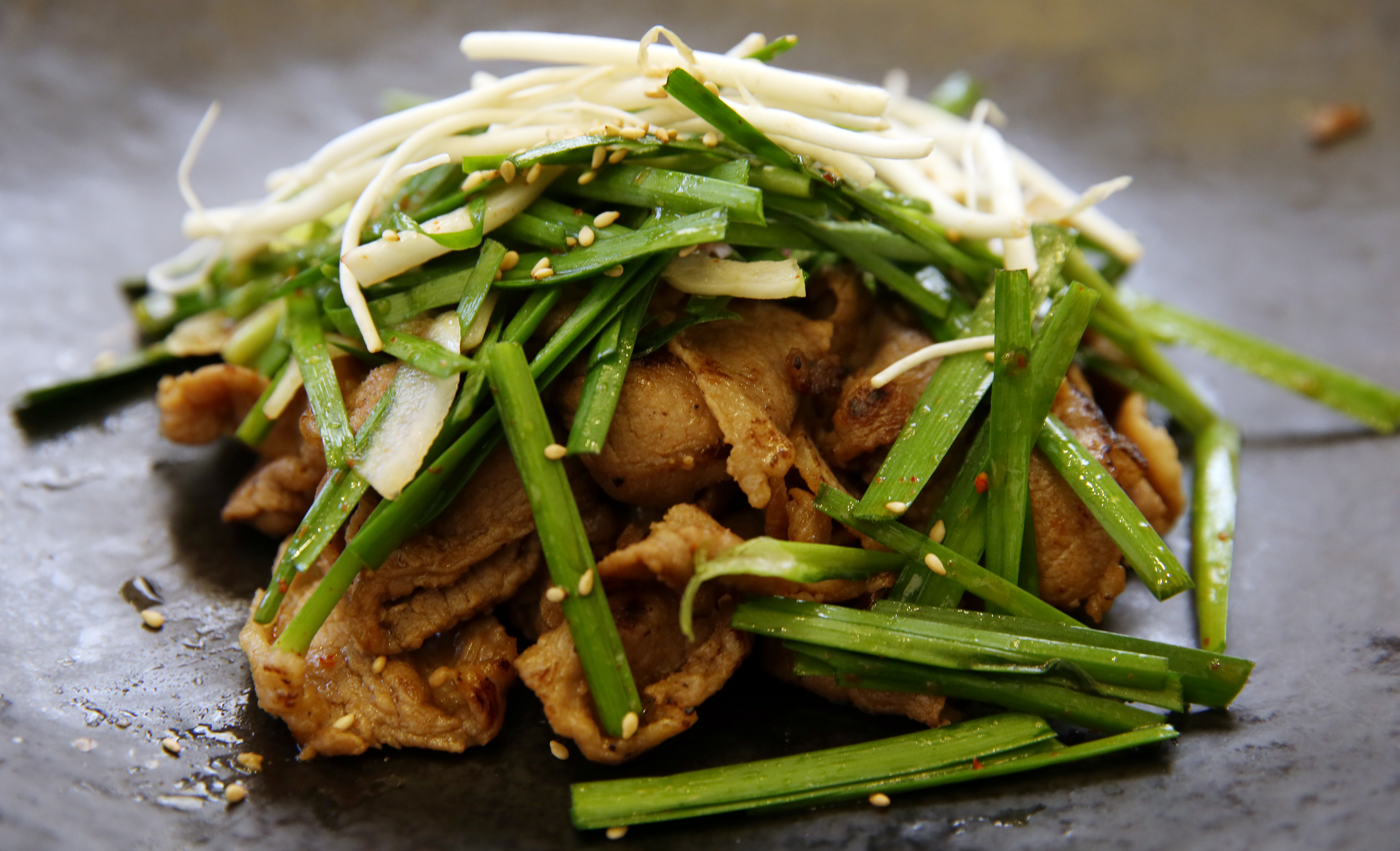
- Type: Korean barbecue
- Place of origin: Goguryeo
- Associated cuisine: Korean cuisine
- Main ingredients: Pork
- Similar dishes: Neobiani, Bulgogi

Korean name
- Hangul: 맥적
- Hanja: 貊炙
- RR: maekjeok
- MR: maekchŏk

Maekjeok (Korean: 맥적) is a meat dish from Goguryeo. It is made by skewering seasoned pork and grilling it over a fire. Maekjeok is considered one of the precursors to bulgogi, a modern Korean meat dish.

== Name ==
Maekjeok is a compound word formed by combining the Hanja characters maek (貊; 맥) and jeok (炙; 적). Maek refers to the Maek tribe, that is, Goguryeo, while jeok refers to food made by seasoning meat and grilling it on a skewer.

== History ==
Maekjeok is discussed in the 4th-century Chinese book In Search of the Supernatural. In a letter, maek (貊) refers to the Yemaek people, the tribe believed to be the ancestors of modern Koreans. The book says "Qiang simmered dish and Yemaek roast are barbarian's foods. Since the beginning of China, they are prized by nobles and rich people" (Note: 羌煮 貊炙 翟之食也。自太始以來 中國尚之。貴人 富室 必留其器) where Yemaek roast is maekjeok. According to another record Shiming, "Maekjeok is a whole pig that is barbecued, from which pieces of meat are sliced off by each individual participating in the meal. It derives from Yemaek." (Note: 貊炙 全體炙之 各自以刀割 出於胡貊之為也)

After the fall of Goguryeo, the culture of meat-eating declined under the influence of Buddhism, and the dish was forgotten. However, it is believed to have been revived as seolyamyeok (설야멱; 雪夜覓) toward the end of the Goryeo dynasty, when meat consumption resumed due to the influence of the Mongol Empire, and that it evolved into neobiani during the Joseon dynasty and eventually into modern-day bulgogi.

== See also ==
- Bulgogi
- Jeok
