= Bulgogi =

Korean meat dish

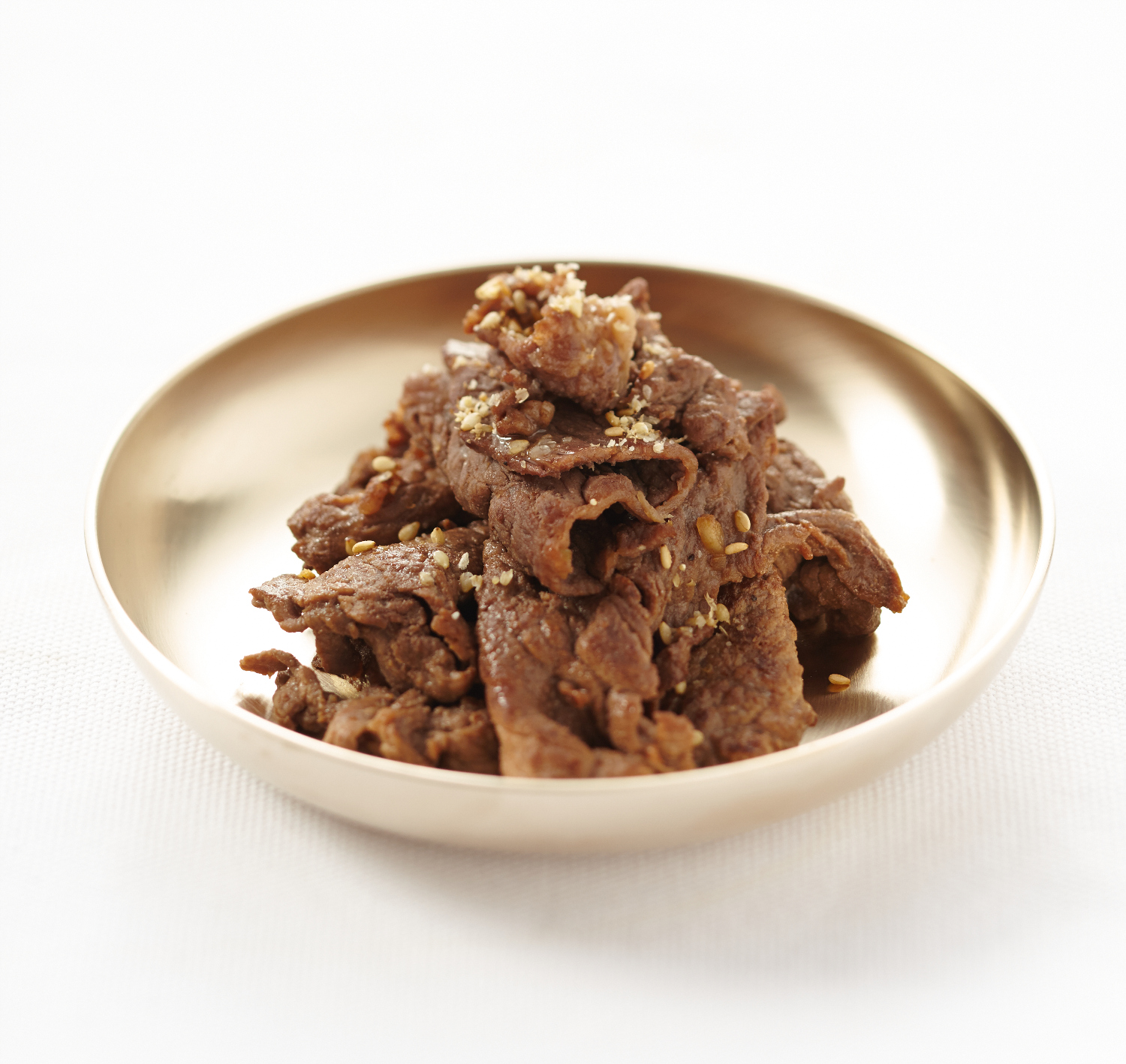
- Type: Gui
- Place of origin: Korea
- Region or state: East Asia
- Associated cuisine: Korean cuisine
- Main ingredients: Beef
- Food energy (per 150 g or 5 oz serving): 150 kcal (630 kJ)
- Similar dishes: Neobiani, galbi, yakiniku

Korean name
- Hangul: 불고기
- RR: bulgogi
- MR: pulgogi
- IPA: puɭɡoɡi

Bulgogi (/bʊlˈɡoʊɡi/ buul-GOH-ghee, UK also /ˈbʊlɡɒɡi/ BUUL-gog-ee, US also /ˈbuːlɡoʊɡi/ BOOL-goh-ghee; Korean: 불고기 [puɭɡoɡi], lit. 'fire meat') is a gui (Korean-style grilled or roasted dish) made of thin, marinated slices of meat, most commonly beef, grilled on a barbecue or on a stove-top griddle. It is also often stir-fried in a pan in home cooking. Sirloin and rib eye are frequently used cuts of beef for the dish. Bulgogi is a very popular dish in South Korea, where it can be found anywhere from upscale restaurants to local supermarkets as pan-ready kits.

== Etymology ==
Bulgogi came from the Korean word bulgogi (불고기), consisting of bul ("fire") and gogi ("meat"). The compound word is derived from the Pyongan dialect, as the dish itself is a delicacy of Pyongan Province, North Korea. The dish became popular in Seoul and other parts of South Korea, introduced by refugees from Pyongan. It was listed in the 1947 edition of the Dictionary of the Korean Language as meat grilled directly over a charcoal fire.

In the Standard Korean Language Dictionary published by the National Institute of Korean Language, the word is listed as meat, such as beef that is thinly sliced, marinated, and grilled over a fire. The word is also included in English-language dictionaries such as the Merriam-Webster Dictionary and the Oxford Dictionary of English. Merriam-Webster dated the word's appearance in the American English lexicon in 1961.

== History ==
Bulgogi is believed to have originated during the Goguryeo era (37 BCE–668 CE), when it was originally called maekjeok (Korean: 맥적; Hanja: 貊炙), with the beef being grilled on a skewer. It was called neobiani (너비아니), meaning "thinly spread" meat, during the Joseon period and was traditionally prepared especially for the wealthy and the nobility.

== Preparation and serving ==
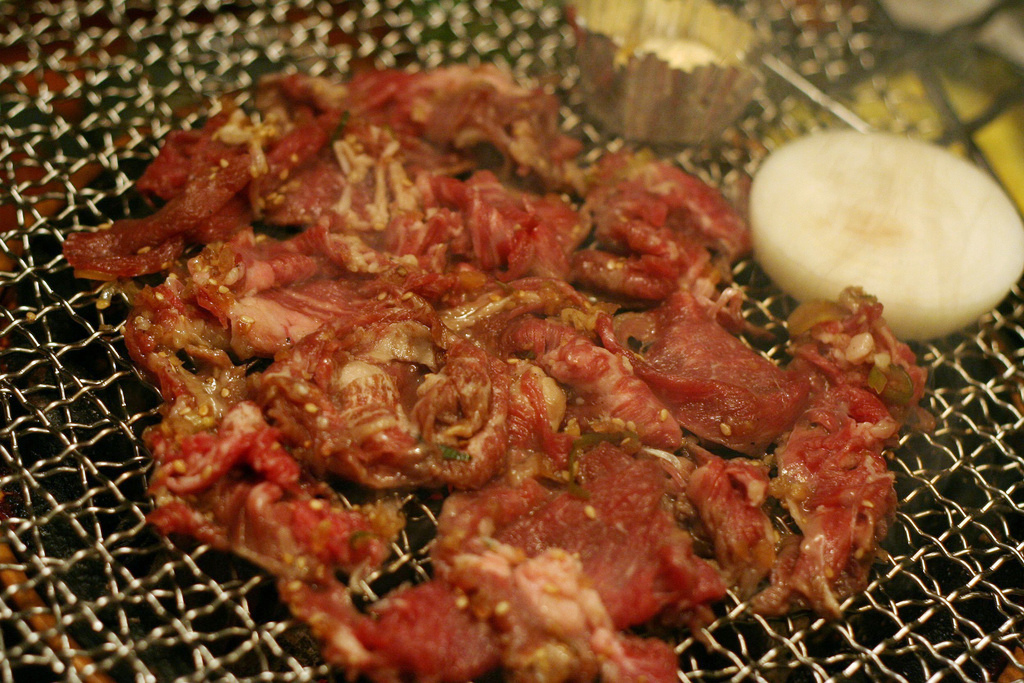
Bulgogi, Korean grilled beef

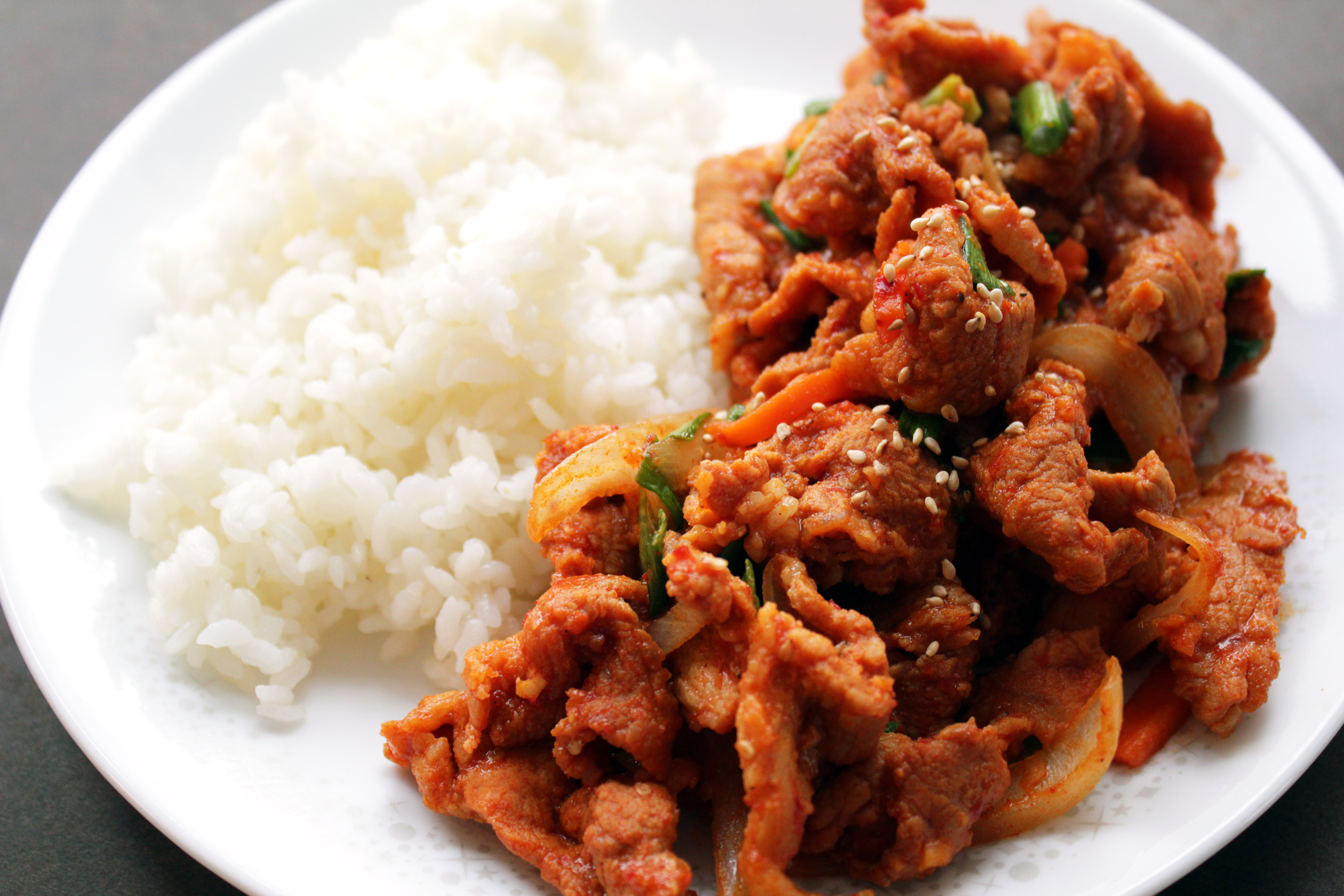
Dwaeji-bulgogi (돼지 불고기) (pork bulgogi) with rice

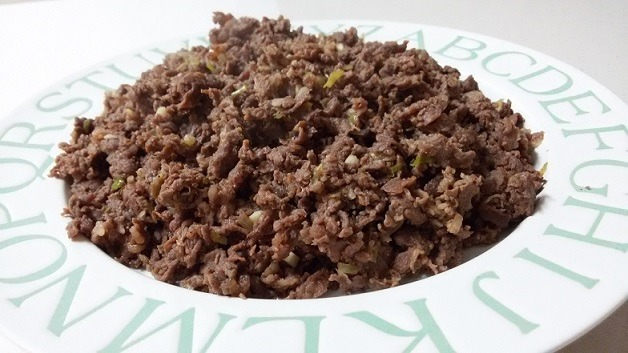
Bassak-bulgogi (바싹 불고기) (Eonyang-style bulgogi)

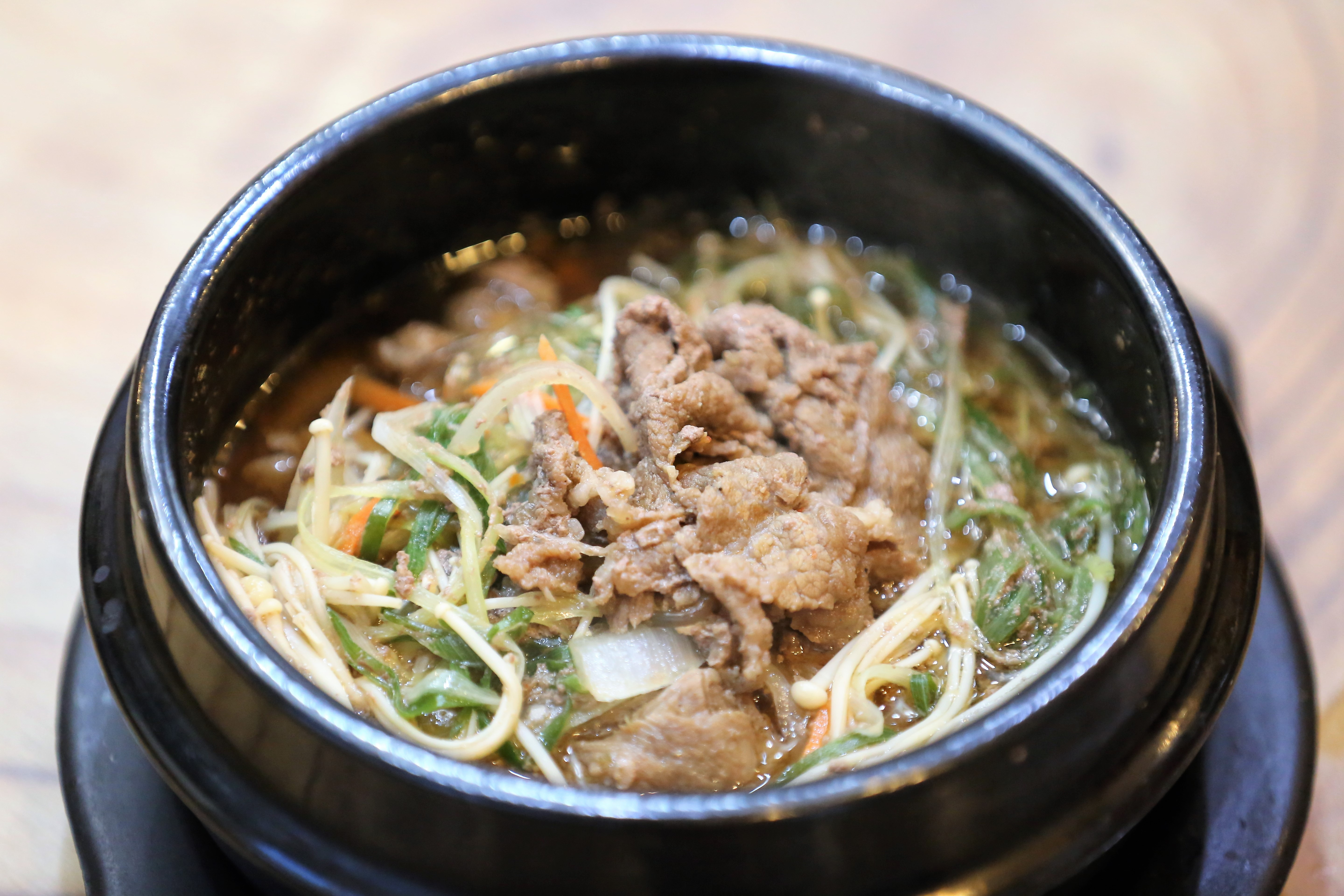
Ttukbaegi-bulgogi (뚝배기 불고기) (hot pot bulgogi)

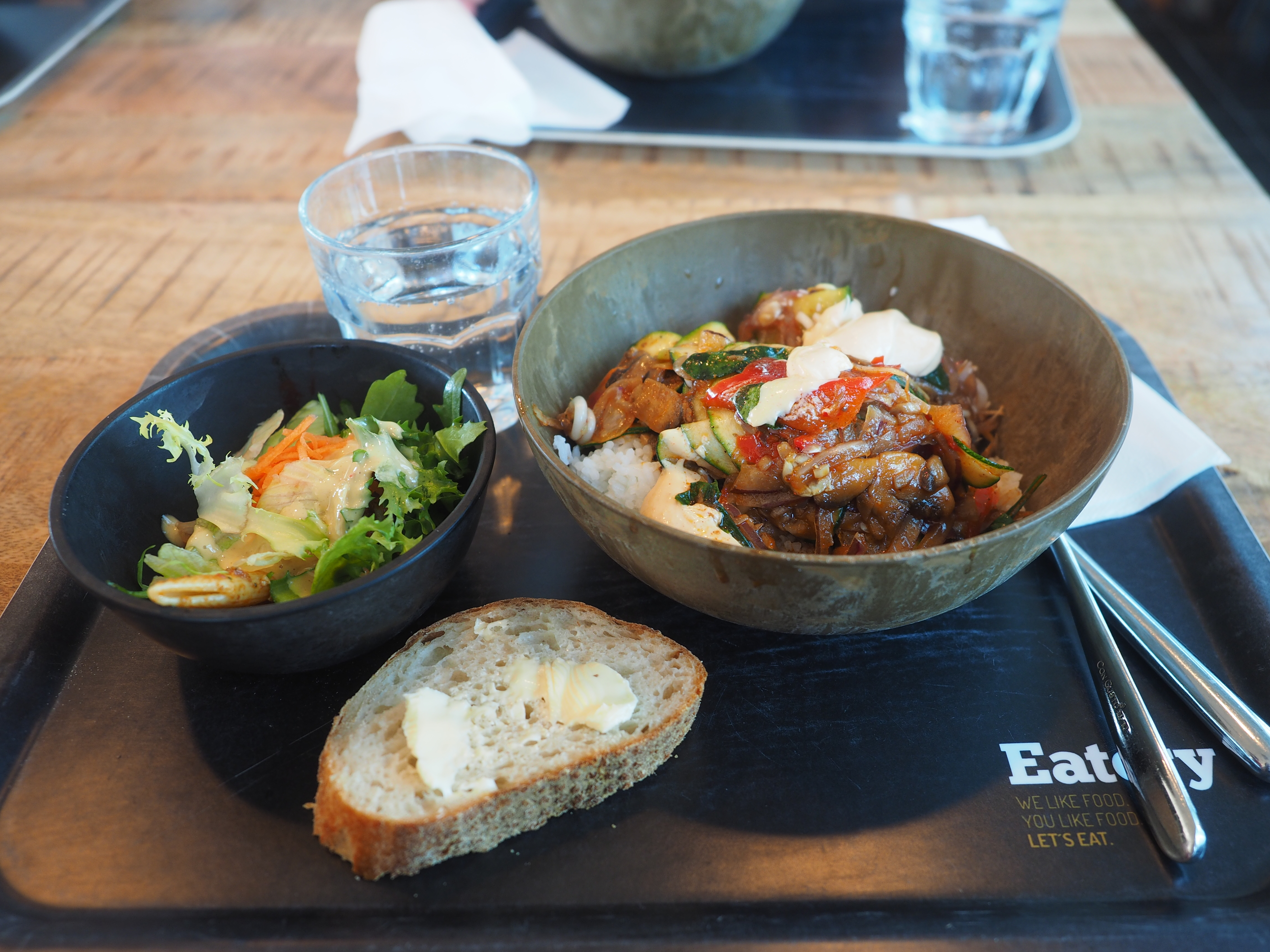
Bulgogi at a lunch restaurant in Sweden

Bulgogi is made from thin slices of sirloin or other prime cuts of beef. Ribeye is also commonly used due to its tenderness and easy slicing. Besides beef, chicken and pork bulgogi are also common. Pork belly, or samgyeopsal in Korean, is a popular cut for pork bulgogi--much like the ribeye, it is tender and fatty, which can give the meat a better taste. Before cooking, bulgogi meat is marinated to enhance its flavor and tenderness with a mixture of soy sauce, sugar, sesame oil, garlic, ground black pepper, and other ingredients such as scallions, ginger, onions, New World peppers, or mushrooms, especially white button mushrooms or matsutake. Pureed pears, pineapple, kiwi, and onions are often added as tenderizers/flavor enhancers. Sugar or other sweeteners, such as corn syrup or honey, may also be added. However, bulgogi marinade ingredients vary from chef to chef and from family to family, depending on preferences and traditions. The length of time in which the meat is left to marinate also varies: Generally, bulgogi meat is left to marinate for less than an hour, but some chefs recommend marinading overnight in a refrigerator. Sometimes, cellophane noodles are added to the dish, which varies by the region and specific recipe.

The most common way of preparing beef bulgogi produces a dark-looking texture that is well-seasoned and flavored. Spicy variations are also common, where a spicy paste such as gochujang, made from chili powder, rice, fermented soybeans, barley, and salt, is added to the marinade. This is most commonly done with the pork variations.

Bulgogi is traditionally grilled, but pan-cooking has become popular as well. Whole cloves of garlic, sliced onions and chopped green peppers are often grilled or fried with the meat. Bulgogi is often served over or with a side of rice and accompanied by various side dishes such as egg soup and kimchi (fermented cabbage). This dish is sometimes served with a side of lettuce or other leafy vegetable, which is used to wrap a slice of cooked meat, often along with a dab of ssamjang, rice, or other side dishes, and then eaten together.

In many Korean barbecue restaurants, customers are seated at a table that will have a grill installed in the middle. Raw and marinated bulgogi is one of many popular types that customers can order and cook themselves right on the table. It is common for each person to pick at the meat directly from the grill or serve each other when eating. Bulgogi is eaten any time of the year; however, it is common for people in Korea to enjoy grilling the marinated meat on special occasions or in social settings.

== In popular culture ==
Bulgogi is served in barbecue restaurants in Korea, and there are bulgogi-flavored fast-food hamburgers sold at many South Korean fast-food restaurants. The hamburger patty is marinated in bulgogi sauce and served with lettuce, tomato, onion, and sometimes cheese.

== Variations ==
- Kongnamul-bulgogi
- Osam-bulgogi

== See also ==
- Galbi
- Korean barbecue
- Korean royal court cuisine
- List of beef dishes
