= Yakiniku =

Korean-style grilled meat cuisine in Japan

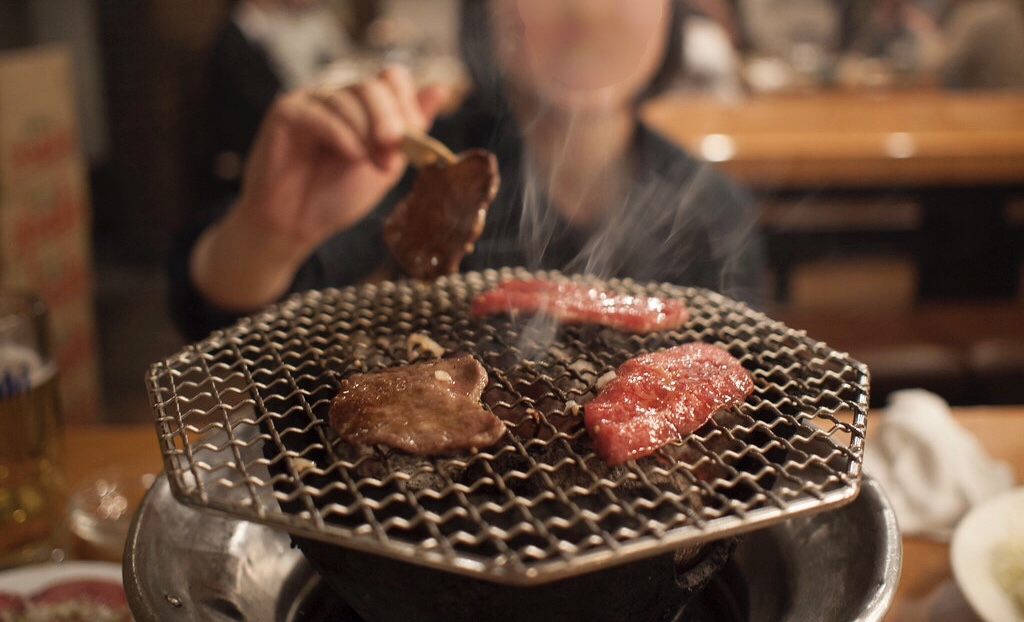
- Yakiniku
- Type: Korean-Japanese cuisine
- Place of origin: Korea (original); Japan (adaptation)
- Created by: Zainichi
- Similar dishes: Korean BBQ

Yakiniku (Japanese: 焼き肉, 焼肉) is a Japanese term meaning "grilled meat".

Commonly, yakiniku refers to a style of cooking bite-size meat (usually beef and offal) and vegetables on gridirons or griddles over a flame of wood charcoals carbonized by dry distillation (sumibi, 炭火) or a gas or electric grill. It is one of the most popular dishes in Japan. The origin of contemporary yakiniku is considered to be Korean barbecue, one of the most popular dishes in Korean cuisine.

Yakiniku originally referred to western barbecue. The term was popularized by Japanese writer Kanagaki Robun (仮名垣魯文) in his Seiyo Ryoritsu (i.e. "western food handbook") in 1872 (Meiji period). The term later became associated with Korean-derived cuisine (Korean barbecue) during the early Shōwa period. Due to the Korean War, the terms associated with Korea in Japan were divided into North Korea (Kita Chōsen) and South Korea (Kankoku); the reference to a "yakiniku restaurant" arose as a politically correct term for restaurants of either origin.

The present style of yakiniku restaurants are derived from Korean restaurants in Osaka and Tokyo, which opened around 1945 by Koreans in Japan. In a yakiniku restaurant, diners order prepared raw ingredients (individually or as a set) which are brought to the table. The ingredients are cooked by the diners on a grill built into the table, several pieces at a time. The ingredients are then dipped in sauces known as tare before being eaten. The most common sauce is made of soy sauce mixed with sake, mirin, sugar, garlic, fruit juice and sesame. Garlic-and-shallot or miso-based dips are sometimes used.

== History ==
=== Etymology ===
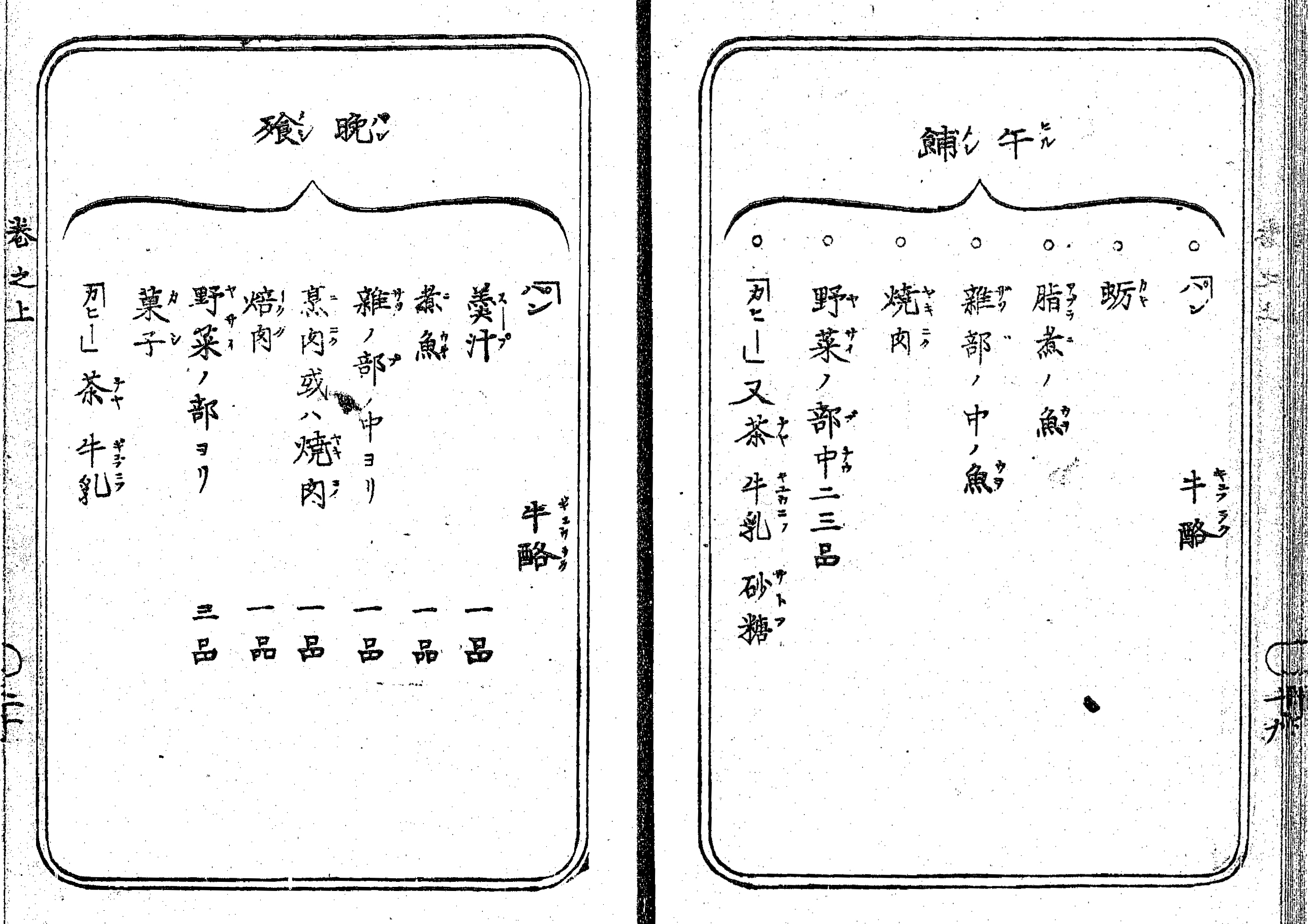
Proposed western-style menus in Seiyō Ryōri Shinan (1872) recommending a cold meat dish for breakfast, yakiniku for lunch, and a simmered meat or yakiniku dish with a roasted meat dish for dinner

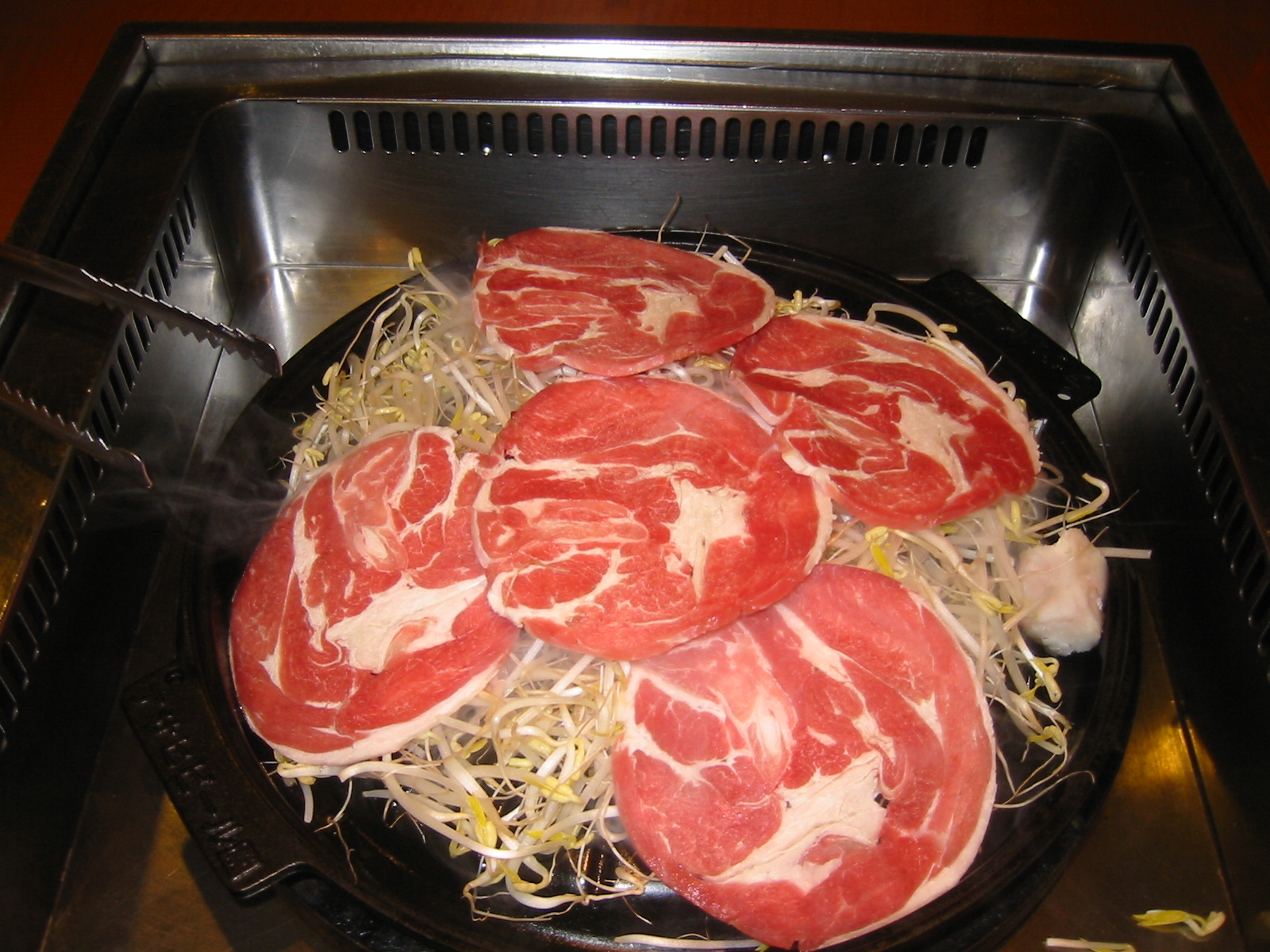
Jingisukan

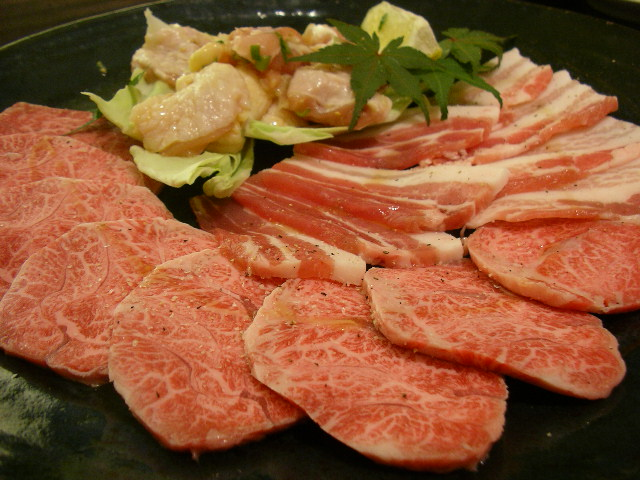
Meat for yakiniku

After officially being prohibited for many years, beef consumption was legalised in 1871 following the Meiji Restoration as part of an effort to introduce western culture to the country. The Emperor Meiji became part of a campaign to promote beef consumption, publicly eating beef on January 24, 1873. Steak and roasted meat were translated as yakiniku (焼肉) and iriniku (焙肉), respectively, as proposed western-style menus in Seiyō Ryōri Shinan although this usage of the former word was eventually replaced by the loanword sutēki.

Jingisukan, the Japanese transliteration of Genghis Khan, is a style of grilling mutton, which is also referred to as a type of yakiniku. The dish was conceived in Hokkaidō, where it has been a popular blue-collar dish that has only recently gained nationwide popularity. The name Jingisukan is thought to have been invented by Sapporo-born Tokuzo Komai, who was inspired by the grilled mutton dishes of Northeastern Chinese cuisine. The first written mention of the dish under this name was in 1931.

=== Origin ===
Assorted raw beef, pork and chicken slices for yakiniku.

Common Japanese style of yakiniku, drawing heavy influences from Korean dishes such as bulgogi and galbi, became widespread in Japan during the 20th century, most notably after the Second World War. Restaurants serving this dish either advertised themselves as horumonyaki (ホルモン焼き, offal-grill) or simply Joseon (Korean) cuisine (朝鮮料理, Chōsen ryōri). The division of the Korean Peninsula led to disagreements in the mid-1960s in the naming of "Korean food", with pro-South businesses changing their signs to "Kankoku ryōri (韓国料理)" ('Kankoku' being the Japanization of 'Hanguk' (한국), the name for Korea used in South Korea) to replace the term "Chōsen" (朝鮮) (from Joseon, 조선), an older name for Korea which by then had been appropriated by the North.

According to "Nippon Yakiniku Monogatari written by Toshio Miyatsuka", the name "yakiniku" became widespread in the latter half of the 1960s, and before that, "yakiniku" was called "Korean cuisine (朝鮮料理, Chōsen ryōri)". The Korean Peninsula was divided into north and south, and in Japan around this time, the restaurants that served yakiniku and naengmyeon called themselves "Chōsen ryōri (朝鮮料理, Joseon cuisine)", but with treaty on Basic Relations between Japan and the Republic of Korea in 1965, the name "Kankoku ryōri (韓国料理, Korean cuisine)" has increased. Eventually, North Koreans in Japan claimed "Chōsen ryōri" and South Koreans in Japan claimed "Kankoku ryōri", which means "Korean cuisine", which means yakiniku today. It is said that the word "yakiniku" was used as a compromise of political conflict to put an end to this turmoil.

Ventilated barbecue systems, introduced by Shinpo Co., Ltd. in March 1980, quickly spread throughout Japan as they enabled diners to eat yakiniku in a smoke-free environment and greatly extended the clientele.

The popularity of yakiniku was given a further boost in 1991 when the easing of beef import restrictions led to a drop in the price of beef. However, the industry was dealt an unprecedented blow in 2001 with the occurrence of BSE (mad cow disease) in Japan.

== Typical ingredients ==
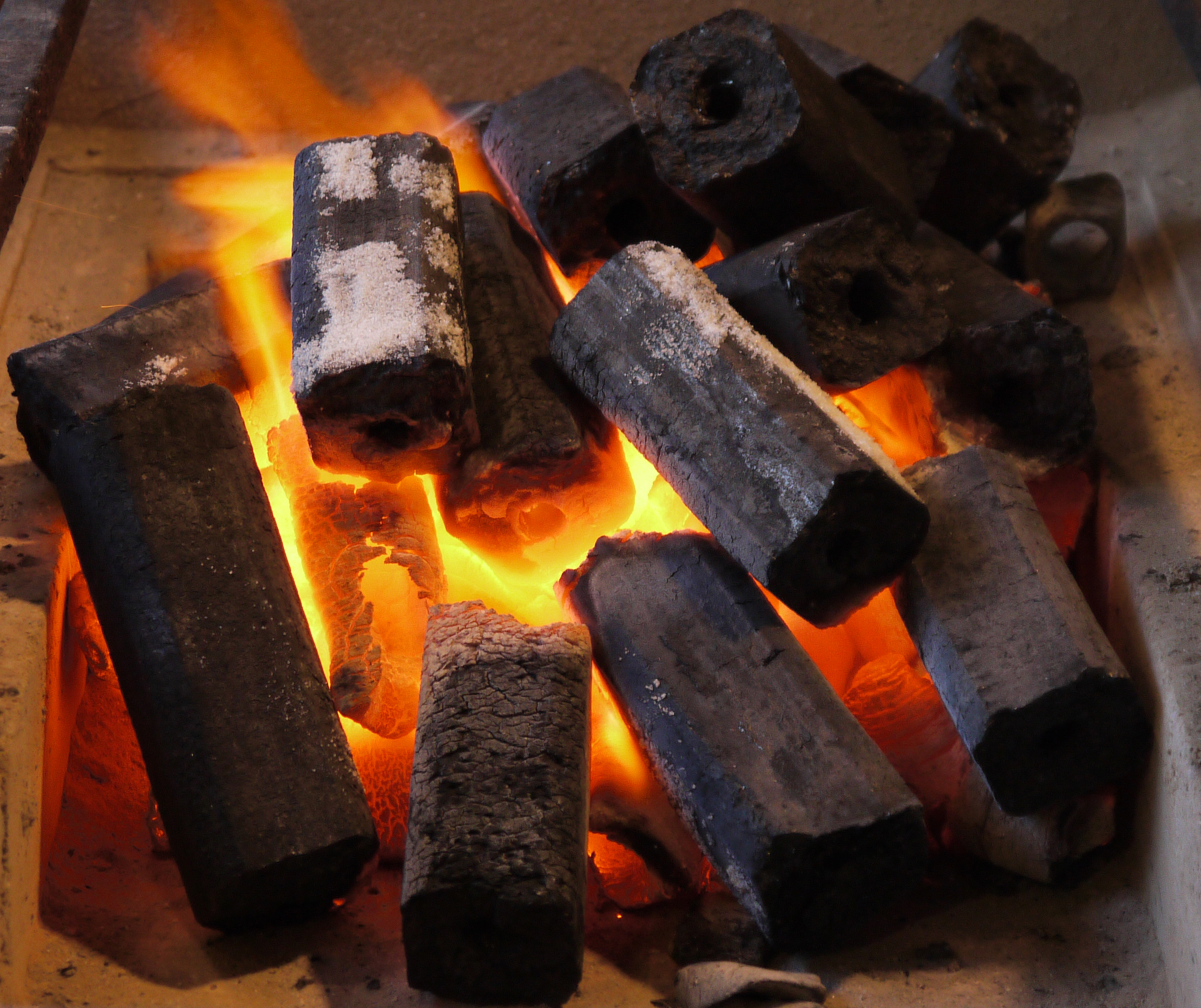
Ogatan, Japanese charcoal briquettes made from sawdust.

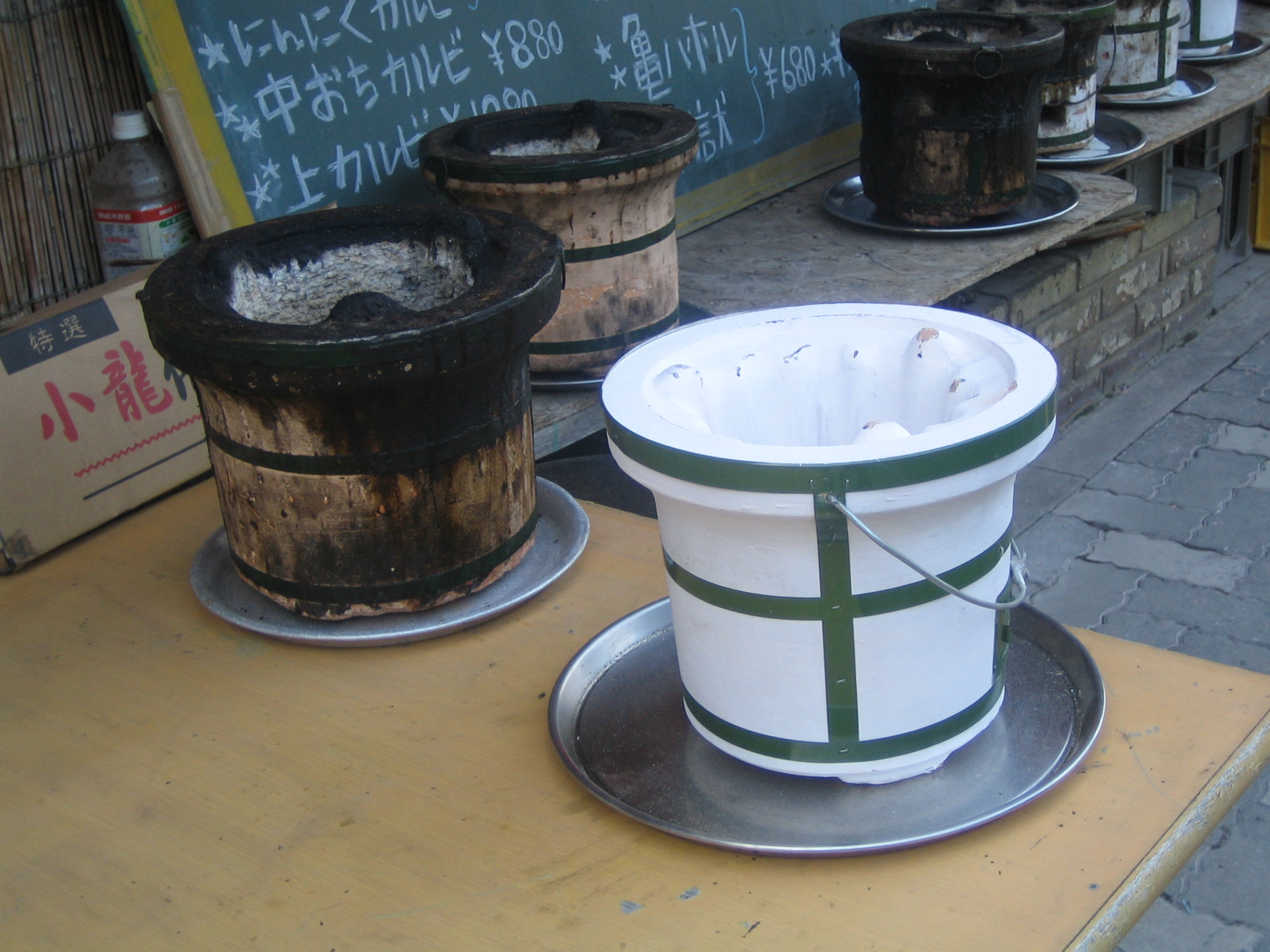
Shichirin, Japanese barbecue grill.

Typical ingredients include:

- Beef
  - Rōsu — loin and chuck slices
  - Karubi or baraniku — short ribs. From the Korean word "galbi". In Japan, it is usually served without the bones, unless it is hone-tsuki-karubi.
  - Harami — tender meat around the diaphragm.
  - Tan — beef tongue. From the English word "tongue". Often served with crushed Welsh onion (Allium fistulosum), salt and lemon juice.
  - Misuji — tender meat around the shoulder.
- Pork
  - Butabara or samugyopusaru — pork belly.
  - P-toro / Tontoro — fatty meat around the cheek and the neck. From the word "Pork toro".
- Horumon or motsu — offal. Horumon means "discarded items" and comes from the Kansai dialect.
  - Rebā — beef liver. From the German word "Leber".
  - Tetchan — intestine. From the Korean word daechang (대창; 大腸). May simply be referred to as horumon.
  - Hatsu — heart. From the English word "heart".
  - Kobukuro — Pork uterus. Enjoyed for its gristly texture.
  - Tēru — From the English word "tail". Slices of beef tail cut crosswise, bone attached.
  - Mino / hachinosu — beef tripe
  - Gatsu — Pork stomach. From the English word "gut".
- Chicken
- Seafood — squid, shellfish, shrimp.
- Vegetables — bell pepper, carrots, shiitake and other mushrooms, onions, cabbage, eggplant, bean sprout (moyashi), garlic and kabocha squash are common.

== Yakiniku Day ==
In 1993, the All Japan Yakiniku Association proclaimed 29 August as official "Yakiniku Day" (焼き肉の日, yakiniku no hi), a form of goroawase (numerical wordplay), as the date 8月29 can be (roughly) read as ya-(tsu)ki-ni-ku (8 = ya, 2 = ni, 9 = ku).

== See also ==
- Asado
- Yakitori
- Teriyaki
- Teppanyaki
- Yakisoba
- Galbi
- Bulgogi
- Gyu-Kaku, a chain of yakiniku restaurants
- Cuisine of Japan
- Barbecue
