= Samgyupsalamat =

Korean barbecue restaurant chain in the Philippines

- Company type: Private
- Industry: Restaurants
- Founded: 2012
- Headquarters: Philippines
- Area served: Philippines
- Products: Korean barbecue

Samgyupsalamat is a Korean barbecue restaurant chain in the Philippines. It was established in 2012 and is known for its unlimited grilling menu. As of December 2025, the company operates 98 branches across the country.

== Name ==
The name "Samgyupsalamat" is a portmanteau of two words. It combines "Samgyeopsal", which refers to grilled pork belly in Korean, and "Salamat", which is the Tagalog word for "thank you". The name translates to "Thank you for eating Samgyupsal".

== History ==
Samgyupsalamat was founded in 2012. Originally, the restaurant operated as an à la carte dining establishment. In 2017, the management changed the business model to offer unlimited meat options. Following this change, the chain began to expand significantly in 2018. By 2018, the company had established over 20 company-owned branches in Metro Manila.

The company uses franchise partnerships to aid its expansion. In August 2019, the chain opened a branch in Bonifacio Global City that operated 24 hours a day. On December 18, 2025, Samgyupsalamat opened its 98th branch at SM City Cebu. This location introduced a new concept that included "Bimbim bowls" and takeout options.

== Operations ==
The restaurant specializes in unlimited Korean barbecue. Customers cook raw meat, such as beef or pork, on tabletop grills. The meals are served with unlimited rice and side dishes. Common side dishes include kimchi, pickled vegetables, and steamed egg.

In 2018, the menu featured five types of pork and four types of beef. At that time, the restaurant did not impose a time limit on diners. The company organizes annual promotional events, such as "3.3 Samgyupsalamat Day" on March 3. During these events, the restaurant offers discounted meal prices and launches marketing campaigns like social media challenges.
