= Jingisukan =

Japanese lamb dish

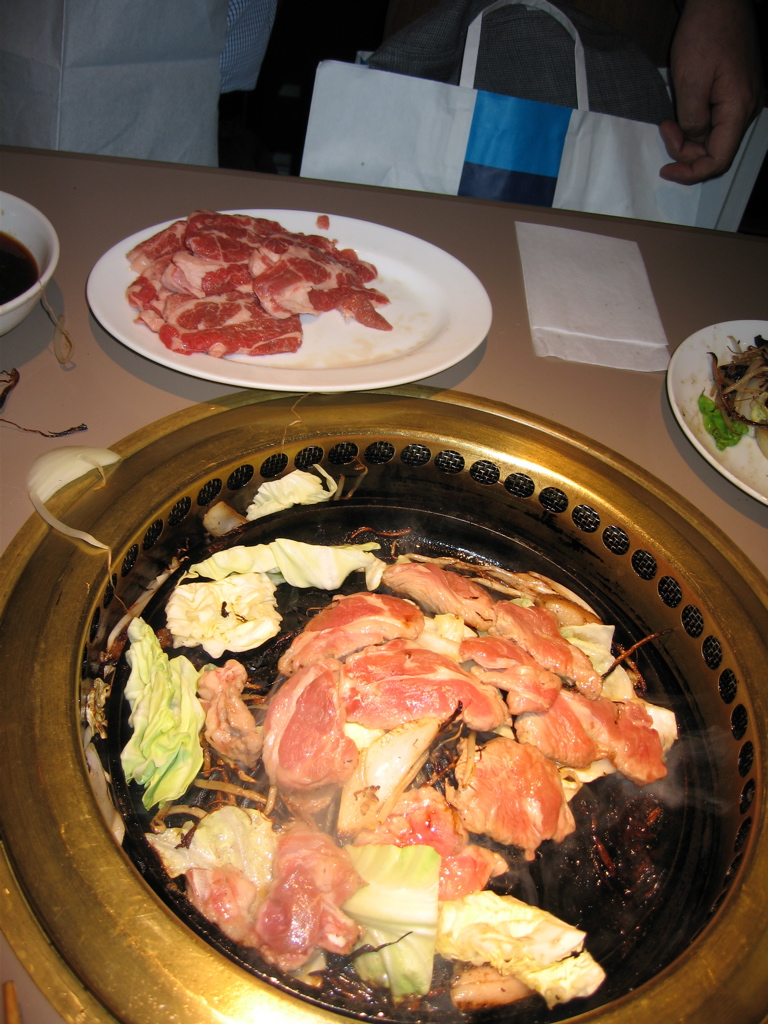
Jingisukan

Jingisukan (Japanese: ジンギスカン; "Genghis Khan") is a Japanese grilled mutton dish prepared on a convex metal skillet or other grill. It is often cooked alongside beansprouts, onions, mushrooms, and bell peppers, and served with a sauce based in either soy sauce or sake. The dish is particularly popular on the northern island of Hokkaidō and in China.

== History ==
Jingisukan, originating from the Japanese transliteration of Genghis Khan, refers to a style of grilling mutton, which is also referred to as a type of yakiniku. The dish was conceived in Hokkaidō, where it has been a popular blue-collar dish that has only recently gained nationwide popularity. The name Jingisukan is thought to have been invented by Sapporo-born Tokuzo Komai, who was inspired by the grilled mutton dishes of Northeastern Chinese cuisine. The first written mention of the dish under this name was in 1931.

In 1918, according to the plan by the Japanese government to increase the flock to one million sheep, five sheep farms were established in Japan. However, all of them were demolished except in Hokkaido (Takikawa and Tsukisamu). Because of this, Hokkaido's residents began eating the meat from sheep that they sheared for their wool.

There is a dispute over from where the dish originated; candidates include Tokyo, Zaō Onsen, and Tōno. The first jingisukan dedicated restaurant was a Jingisu-sō (成吉思荘, "Genghis House") that opened in Tokyo in 1936.

== Gallery ==
Jingisukan Restaurant in Malaysia

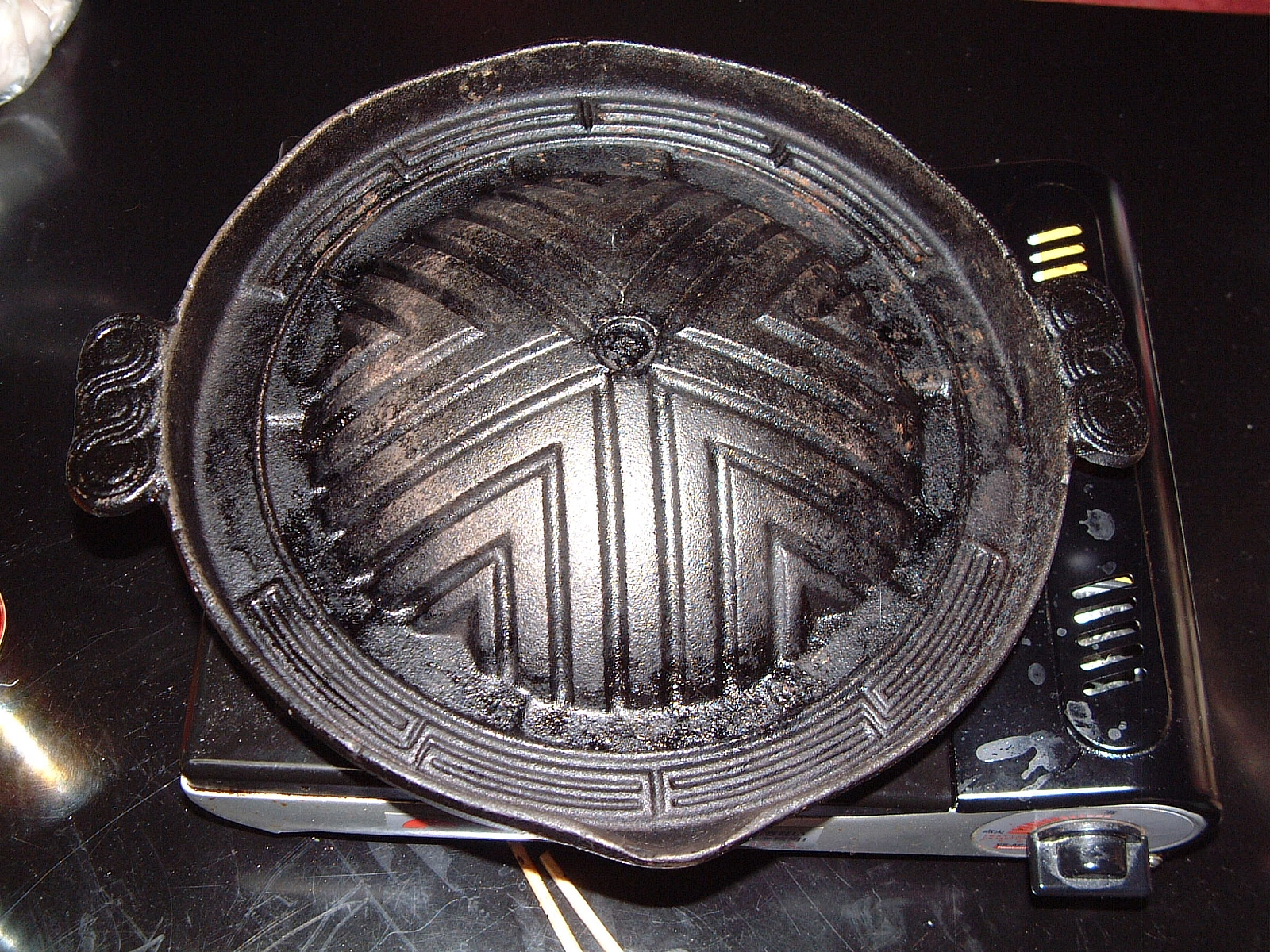
Pan for Jingisukan

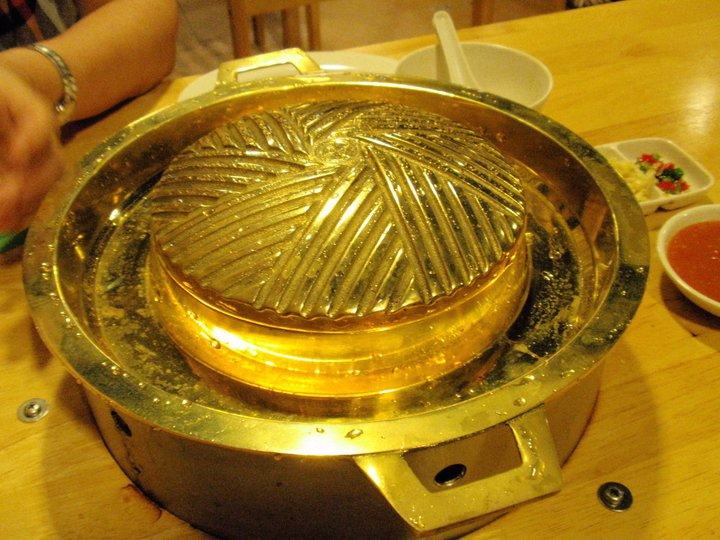
Golden Copper Pan for Jingisukan

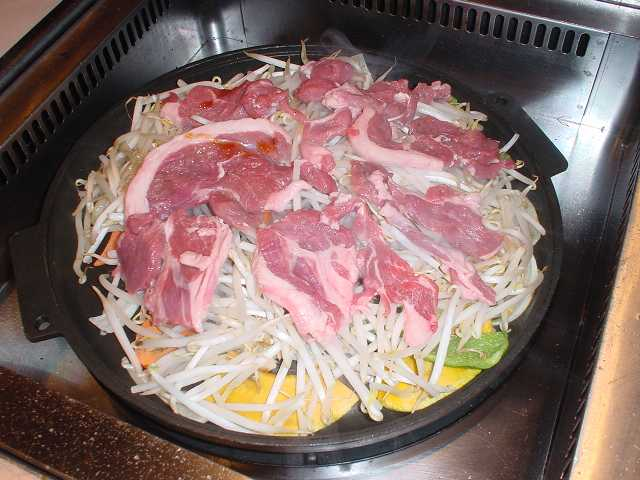
Genghis Khan Nabe before being cooked

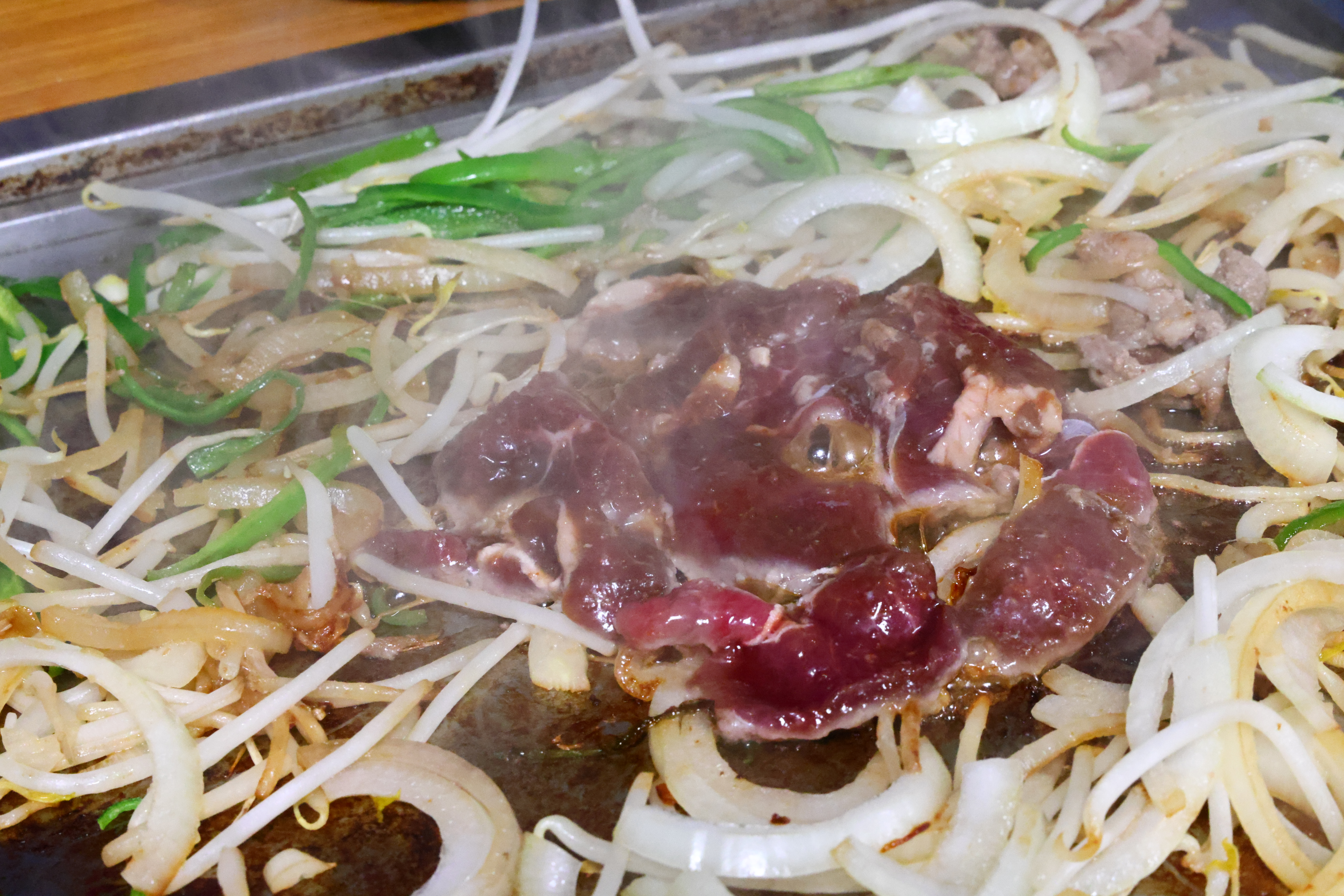
A Jingisukan dish from Shibetsu, Hokkaido

== See also ==
- List of lamb dishes
- Mongolian barbecue
- Teppanyaki
- Yakiniku
