= Dak-galbi =

Korean spicy stir-fried chicken

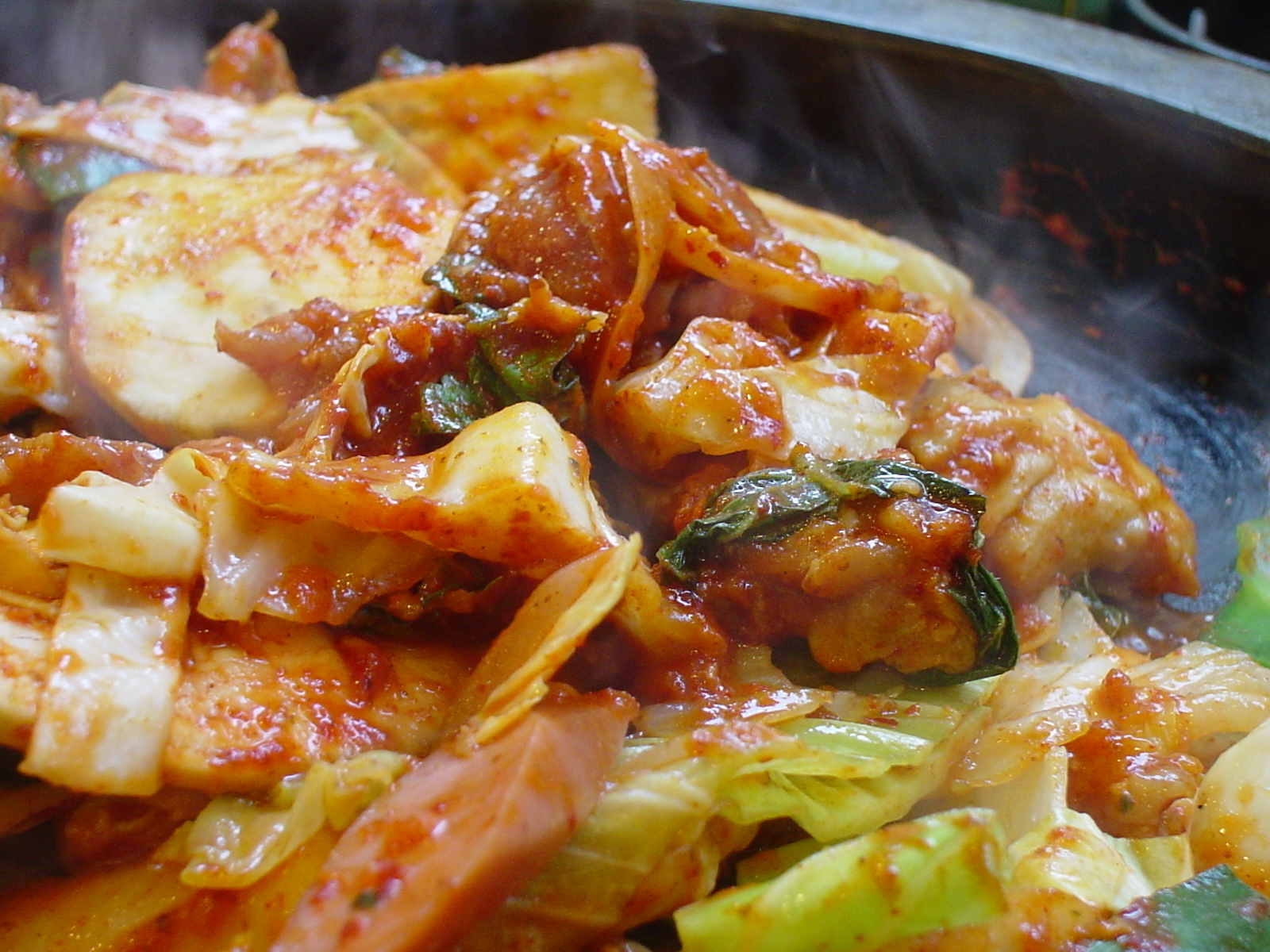
- Alternative names: Spicy stir-fried chicken
- Type: Bokkeum
- Place of origin: South Korea
- Region or state: Chuncheon
- Associated cuisine: South Korean cuisine
- Created by: Kim Yeong-seok
- Invented: 1960s
- Serving temperature: Warm
- Main ingredients: Chicken
- Variations: Muldakgalbi
- Food energy (per 4 serving): 788 kcal (3,300 kJ)

Korean name
- Hangul: 닭갈비
- RR: dakgalbi
- MR: takkalbi
- IPA: tak̚.k͈al.bi

Dak-galbi (Korean: 닭갈비; pronounced [tak̚.k͈al.bi]), or spicy stir-fried chicken, is a popular South Korean dish made by stir-frying marinated diced chicken in a gochujang-based sauce with sweet potatoes, cabbage, Korean perilla, spring onion, tteok (rice cake), and other ingredients. Lettuce and perilla leaves may be served as ssam (wrap) vegetables. Many dak-galbi restaurants have round hot plates that are built into the tables.

In Korean, galbi means rib and usually refers to braised or grilled short ribs. Dak-galbi is not made with chicken ribs, however, and the dish gained this nickname when chicken was used as a substitute for pork ribs.

== History ==
The dish was developed in the 1960s as an anju (accompaniment to alcoholic drinks) in a seonsuljip (pub) in Chuncheon. Kim Yeong-seok, an owner of a pork restaurant, is credited with inventing the dish in the 1960s when he used chicken instead of pork when pork ran out. It was originally called dakbulgogi (닭불고기) and grilled over charcoal.

Dak-galbi later spread to Chuncheon's main districts, where the livestock industry was thriving. As a relatively cheap dish served in large portions, it gained popularity with soldiers and students on a budget and earned the nickname "commoners' galbi" or "university student's galbi" in the 1970s. Due to the overseas popularity of the 2002 drama Winter Sonata which was filmed in Chuncheon, dak-galbi was introduced to foreign countries.

== Regional characteristics ==
In Chuncheon, there are dozens of restaurants in Myeongdong Dakgalbi Street. Chuncheon Mak-guksu & Dak-galbi Festival is held every year to celebrate the two local dishes.

In 1970s-1980s Taebaek, muldakgalbi (물닭갈비) was invented. Marinated chicken is cooked in broth. Glass noodles, various vegetables, and shepherd's purse are added.

== Gallery ==
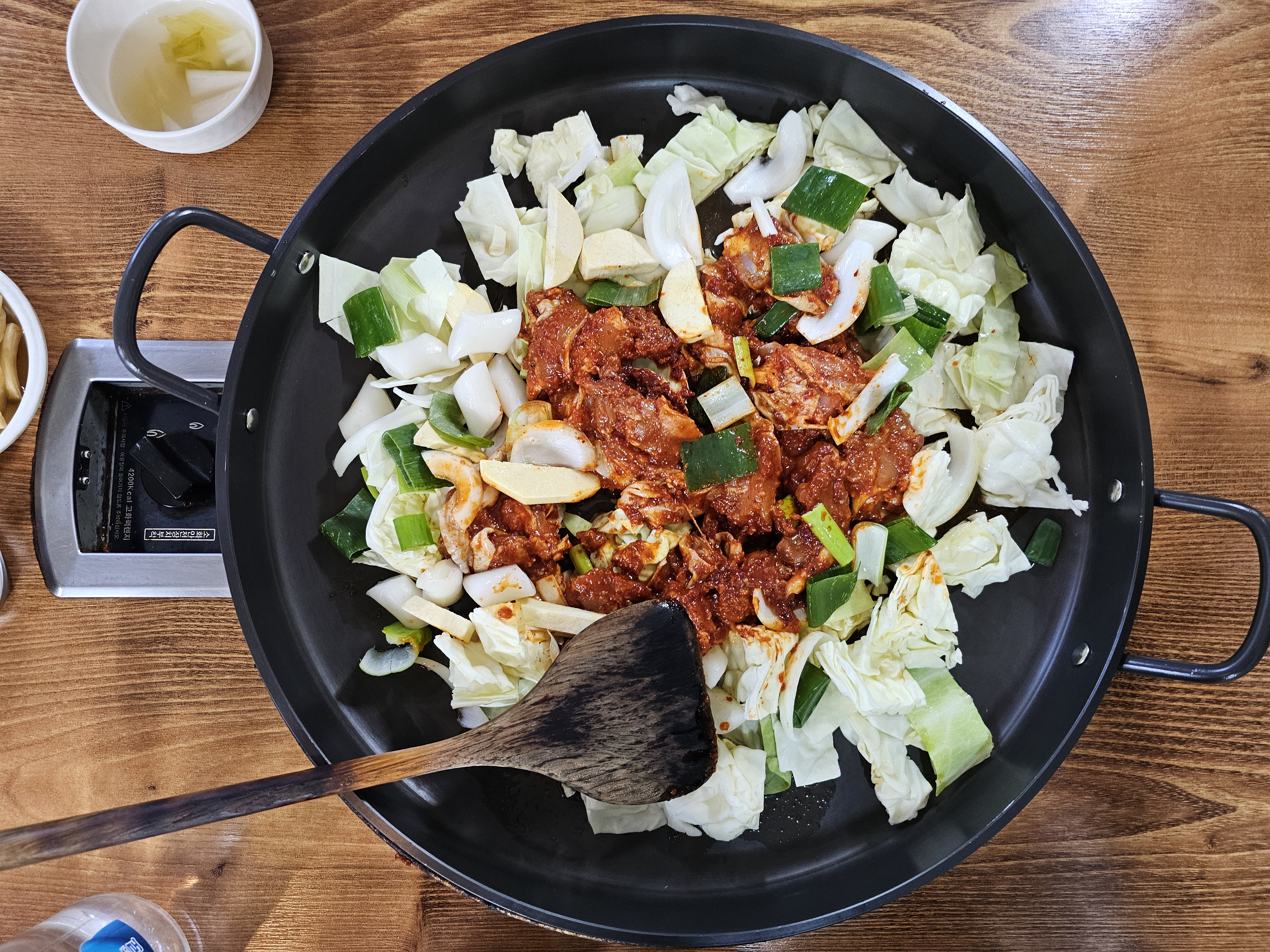
Before cooking

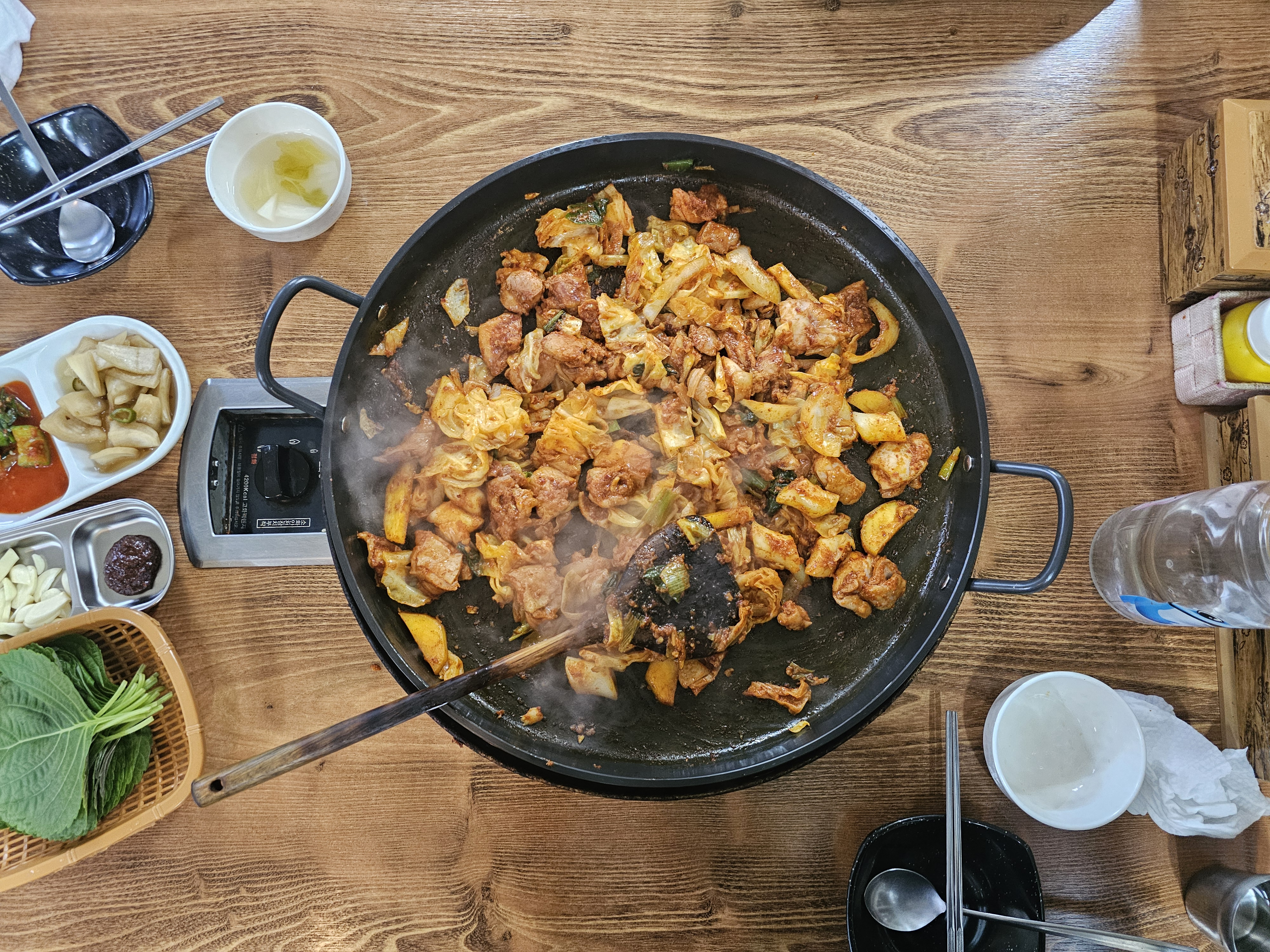
After cooking

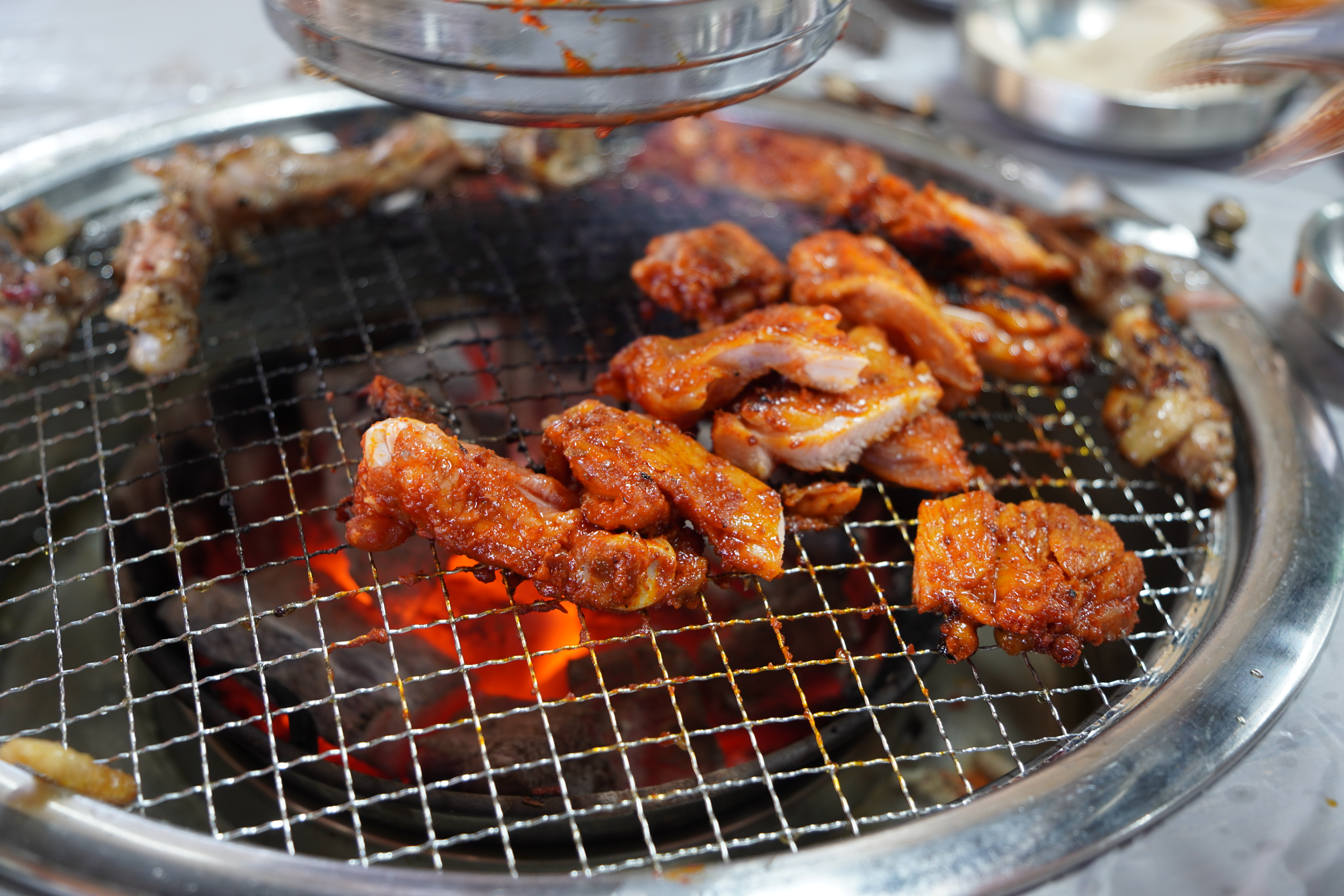
Dakgalbi grilled over charcoal

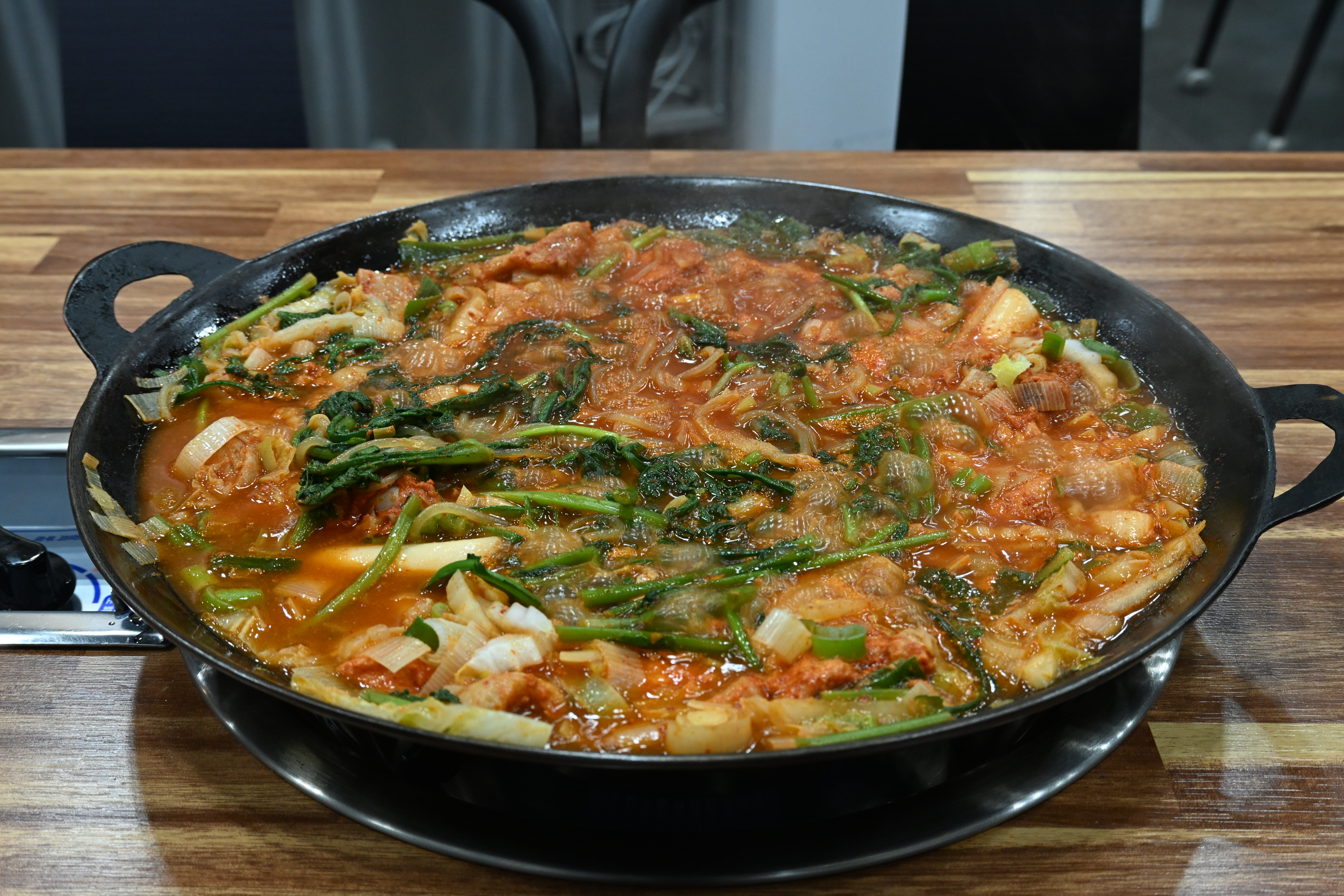
Mul-dak-galbi

== See also ==
- Korean cuisine
- List of chicken dishes
