= Galbi =

Korean grilled beef or pork ribs

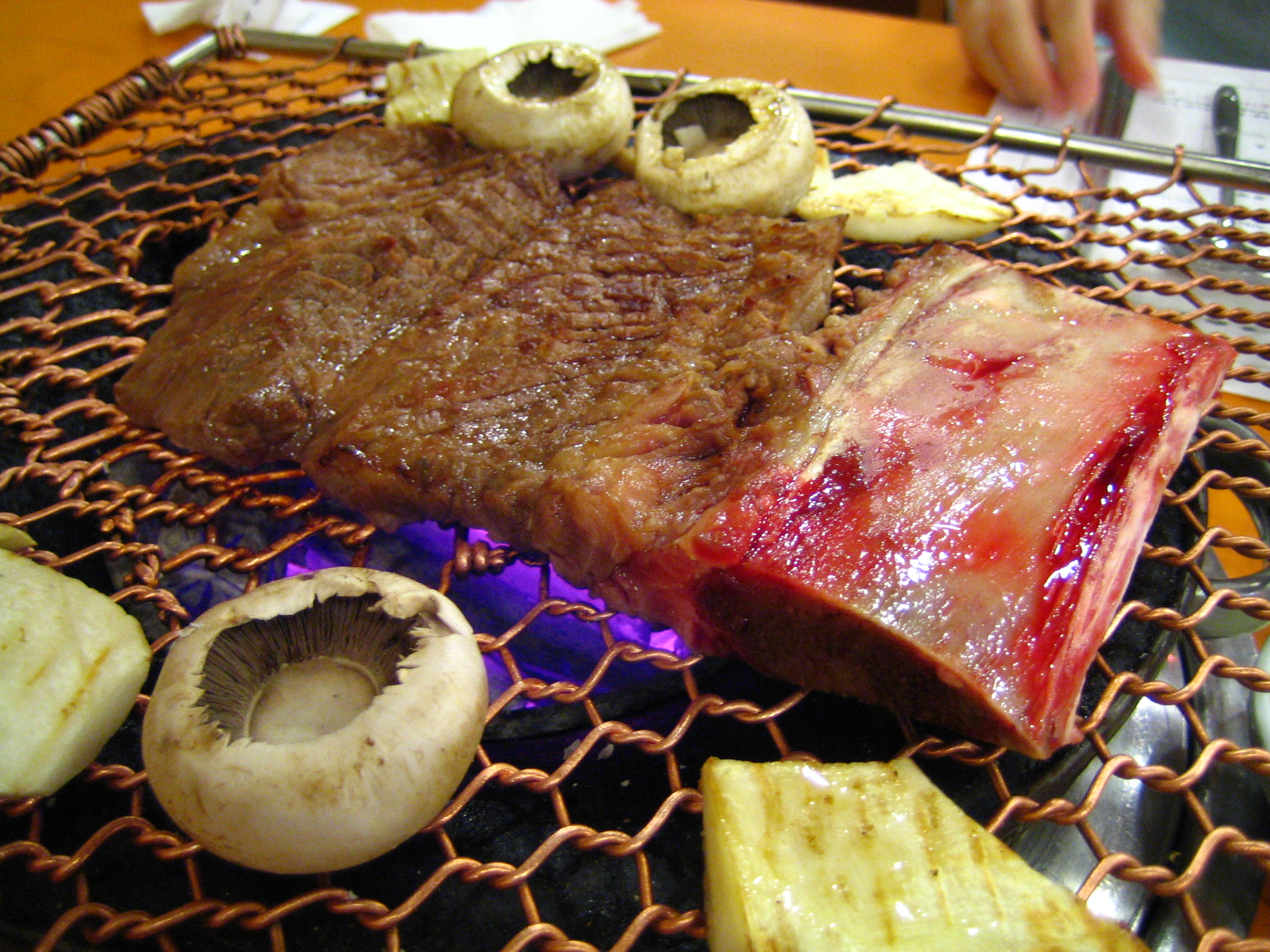
- Alternative names: Galbi-gui, grilled ribs
- Type: Gui
- Place of origin: Korea
- Region or state: East Asia
- Associated cuisine: Korean
- Main ingredients: Beef short ribs or pork spare ribs
- Similar dishes: Dak-galbi, tteok-galbi
- Other information: Often featured in Korean barbecue

Korean name
- Hangul: 갈비
- RR: galbi
- MR: kalbi
- IPA: [kal.bi]

Galbi (Korean: 갈비; pronounced [kal.bi]), kalbi, galbi-gui (갈비구이), or grilled ribs is a type of gui (grilled dish) in traditional Korean cuisine. "Galbi" is the Korean word for "rib", and the dish is usually made with beef short ribs. When pork spare ribs or another meat is used instead, the dish is named accordingly. Galbi is served raw, then cooked on tabletop grills usually by the diners themselves. The dish may be marinated in a sweet and savory sauce usually containing soy sauce, garlic, and sugar. Both non-marinated and marinated galbi are often featured in Korean barbecue. In Japan, this and many other dishes in Korean barbecue influenced yakiniku, a fusion cuisine that often makes use of galbi (glossed as karubi).

== Preparation ==
=== Cuts ===
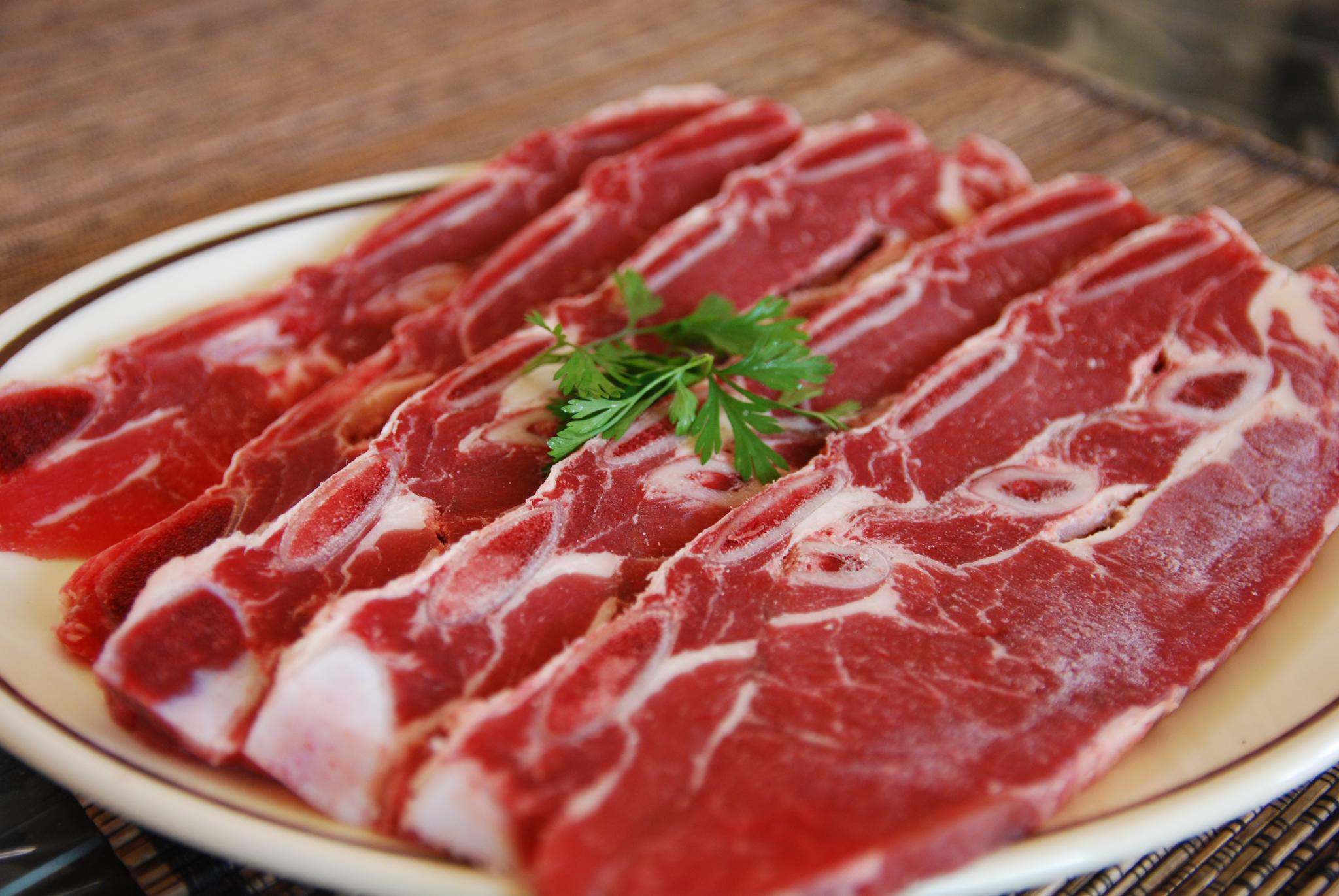
LA galbi

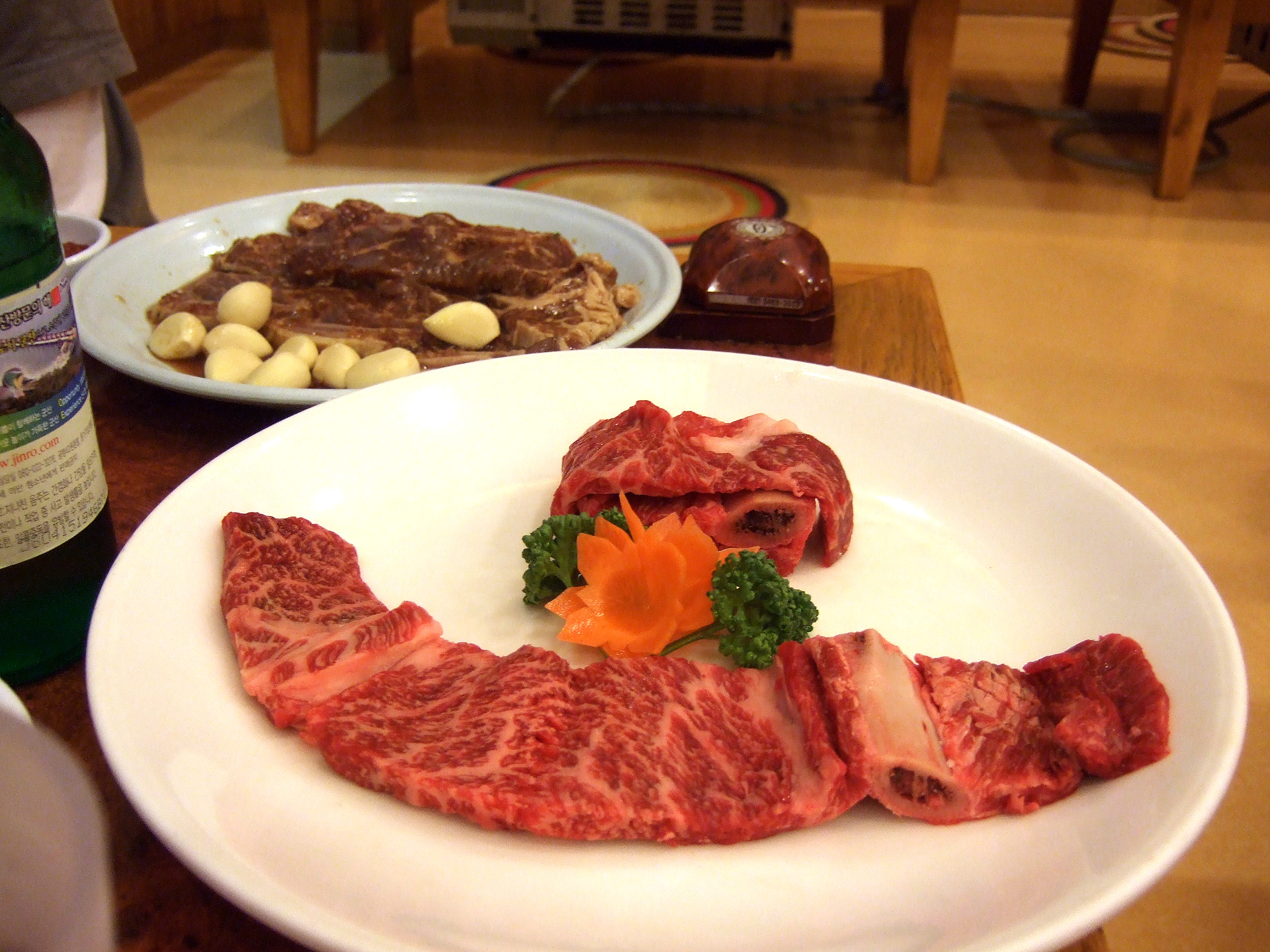
Unmarinated saeng-galbi and marinated yangnyeom-galbi made of hanu (Korean native cattle) beef

Traditionally, galbi is cut to expose one smooth bone along the short edge with the meat uniformly filleted in flat layers.

==== LA galbi ====
Galbi can be made using a flanken cut, which features cut bones peeking out along the long edge. This style is called "LA galbi". The method accommodates thinner rib-eye cuts from whole rack ribs preferred by American butchers.

The specific style of cut emerged some time in the late 20th century. It is widely believed to have been innovated by the Koreans who immigrated to the US during the 1960s–1980s, a period of mass migration of Korean immigrants into Koreatown, Los Angeles, hence the name of the dish, LA Galbi. The flanken cut is not the traditional style in Korea; and the difficulty in obtaining the traditional cut of meat meant the immigrants who owned Korean supermarkets and restaurants had to work with the whole rack ribs the American butchers preferred. The Korean butchers began to cut the whole rack into thin vertical strips, as the traditional galbi is also thinly sliced to allow the marinade to penetrate the meat. The popularity spread through church gatherings, restaurants and into the wider Los Angeles area, and today is a popular cut most commonly available in Korean supermarkets across the US.

One theory, evaluated in an article in the Encyclopedia of Korean Culture as the most plausible, is that the cut was invented by Korean Americans in Los Angeles in the late 20th century. Meat cut in this fashion was considered affordable and allowed for quicker penetration of the marinade. Hence the cut was then imported back to South Korea. Today they enjoy two distinct cuts of Galbi.

Another theory is that the dish was invented in South Korea as part of a marketing campaign to sell American beef in the country. Per the theory, "LA" was used in the name because it was where the most Korean Americans lived in the United States and would have been more familiar.

Another theory is that the term "LA" is an abbreviation of "Lateral Axis", after the direction the ribs are cut.

=== Marination ===
Non-marinated galbi is called saeng-galbi (생갈비; "fresh ribs"); marinated galbi is referred to as yangnyeom-galbi (양념갈비; "seasoned ribs"). Pork galbi is usually served marinated, but non-marinated dwaeji-saeng-galbi (돼지생갈비; "fresh pork ribs"), made of Jeju Black pig, is popular in Jeju Island. As pork ribs are smaller, marinated dwaeji-galbi often consists of pork ribs mixed with shoulder meats.

=== Beef ===
Softer cuts of beef, such as from a cow or heifer, are preferred when grilling galbi. Properly grilled, the dish is a glossy, dark-reddish brown with a smoky, sweet taste. The meat should easily fall from the bones.

The marinade for so-galbi-gui (소갈비구이; "grilled beef ribs") typically includes soy sauce, sugar, minced garlic and scallions, ginger juice, ground black pepper, toasted and ground sesame, and sesame oil. The beef is usually scored on the surface prior to marinating, and the juice from Korean pears is brushed on before grilling.

=== Pork ===
For dwaeji-galbi-gui (돼지갈비구이; "grilled pork ribs"), the marinade can be either ganjang (soy sauce)-based or gochujang (chili paste)-based: the former being similar to beef galbi marinade and the latter being spicy. Cheongju (rice wine) is usually used in both types of marinade to remove any undesired porky smell.

If used, pork shoulder meat is carved into thicker slices of around 2.5 centimetres (1 inch) in width. Deeper cuts are made when scoring the surface to allow the marinade to penetrate the meat.

=== Grilling and serving ===
Galbi is grilled, typically by the diners themselves, on grills set in the tables. The meat cooks for a short time on medium high heat on a lightly greased gridiron over glowing charcoal. The remaining marinade is brushed on during grilling to produce a glazed finish.

Once cooked, the meat is typically cut into pieces over the grill with kitchen scissors, then wrapped inside lettuce leaves, kkaennip (perilla frutescens), or other leafy vegetables. These made-on-the-spot leaf wraps, called ssam, usually include a piece of grilled meat, ssamjang, raw or grilled garlic, and a sauce made of doenjang (soybean paste) and gochujang (chili paste). Like other Korean main dishes, galbi is often accompanied by bap (cooked rice) and side dishes known as banchan.

== See also ==
- Korean cuisine
- Bulgogi – barbequed beef or pork
- Dak-galbi – spicy stir-fried chicken
- Galbi-jjim – braised short ribs
- Galbi-tang – short rib soup
- Korean barbecue
- Samgyeopsal – grilled pork belly
- Tteok-galbi – grilled short rib patties
- Yakiniku – a similar Japanese dish
- Asado
