= Osam-bulgogi =

Korean spicy squid and pork dish

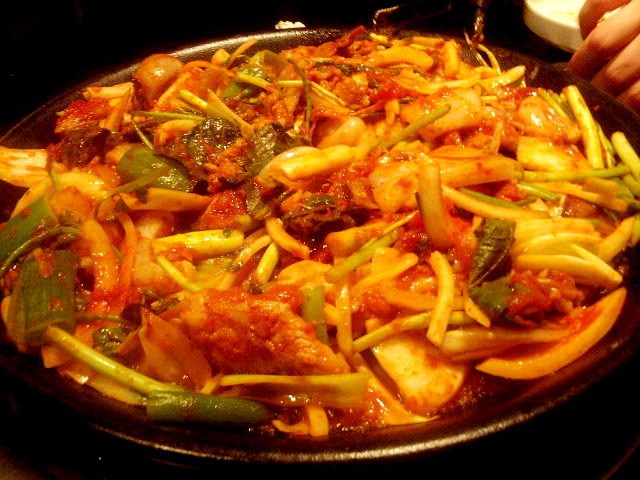
- Place of origin: Korea
- Main ingredients: Squid, pork belly

Korean name
- Hangul: 오삼불고기
- RR: osambulgogi
- MR: osambulgogi
- IPA: [o.sam.bul.ɡo.ɡi]

Osam-bulgogi (Korean: 오삼불고기) is a Korean dish made from squid (ojingeo in Korean) and pork belly (samgyeopsal in Korean), marinated in a blend of seasonings. The mixture is cooked over a griddle with an assortment of vegetables and mushrooms. The name “Osam” is derived from combining the first syllables of ojingeo (오징어, squid) and samgyeopsal (삼겹살, pork belly).

The dish features thinly sliced pork belly and cleaned squid stir‑fried over high heat with a spicy‑sweet sauce typically based on red pepper paste (gochujang) and red pepper powder (gochugaru), often with garlic, onions, and other aromatics. The result is a vivid red, intensely flavored mixture showcasing the contrast between the fatty richness of pork and the chewy seafood texture of squid.

Osam‑bulgogi is associated with the coastal and eastern regions of Korea, especially the east‑coast province of Gangwon, where squid and pork have historically been abundant and inexpensive. Napjak Sikdang in Pyeongchang County is credited with inventing the dish. The dish remains a popular everyday meal and appears frequently in local restaurants and eateries.
