= Neobiani =

Thinly sliced, marinated, and grilled beef

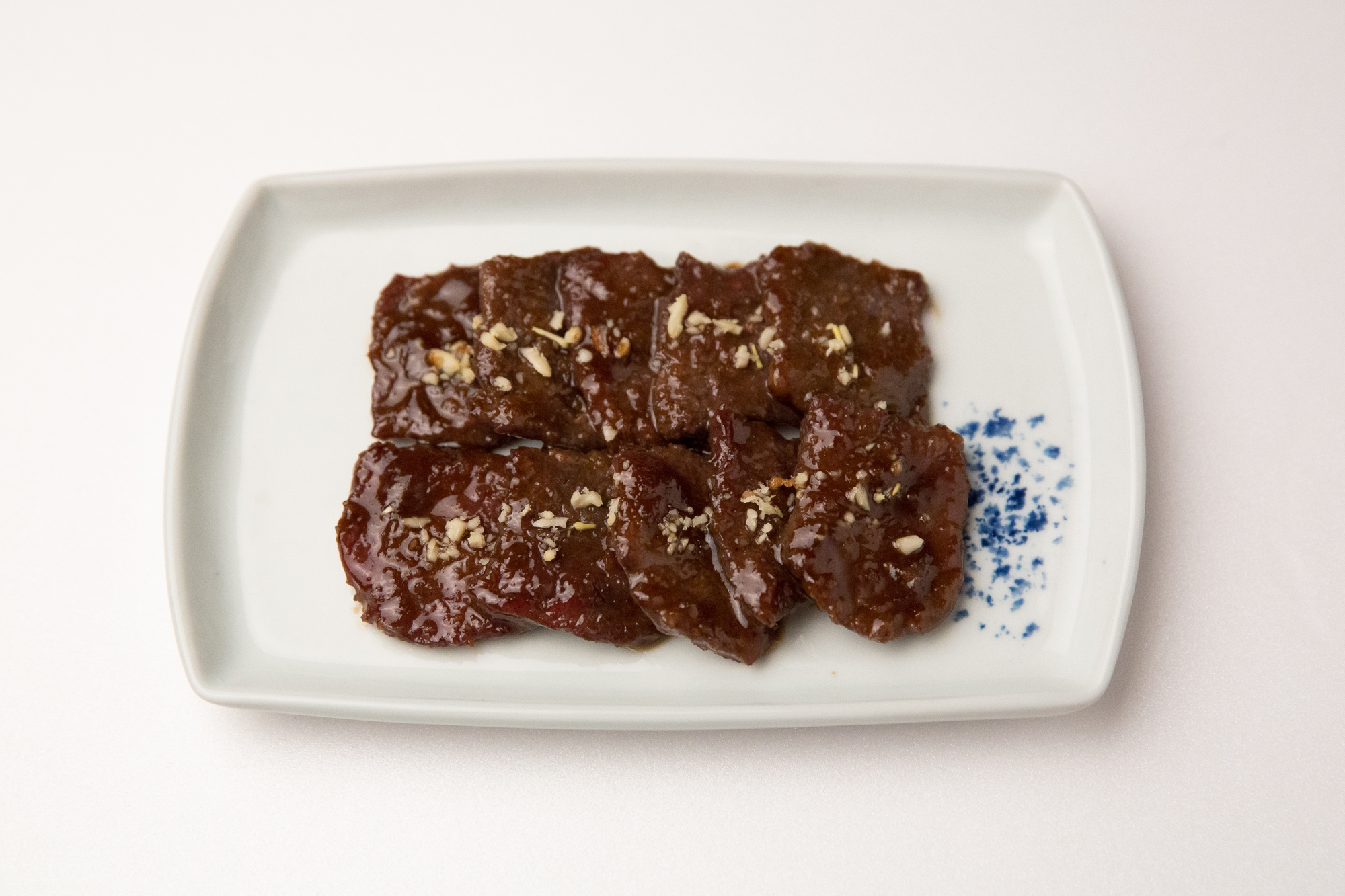
- Place of origin: Korea
- Region or state: Seoul
- Associated cuisine: Korean royal court cuisine
- Main ingredients: Beef
- Food energy (per 1 serving): 75 kcal (310 kJ)
- Similar dishes: Bulgogi

Korean name
- Hangul: 너비아니
- RR: neobiani
- MR: nŏbiani
- IPA: [nʌ.bi.a.ni]

Neobiani (Korean: 너비아니) or nubianie refers to thinly sliced, marinated, and grilled beef. In Korean, the word neobiani means that the beef is sliced into broad sections. It was enjoyed at court during the Joseon period.

== See also ==
- Korean BBQ
- Korean cuisine
- Bulgogi
