= Samgyeopsal =

Korean grilled pork belly dish

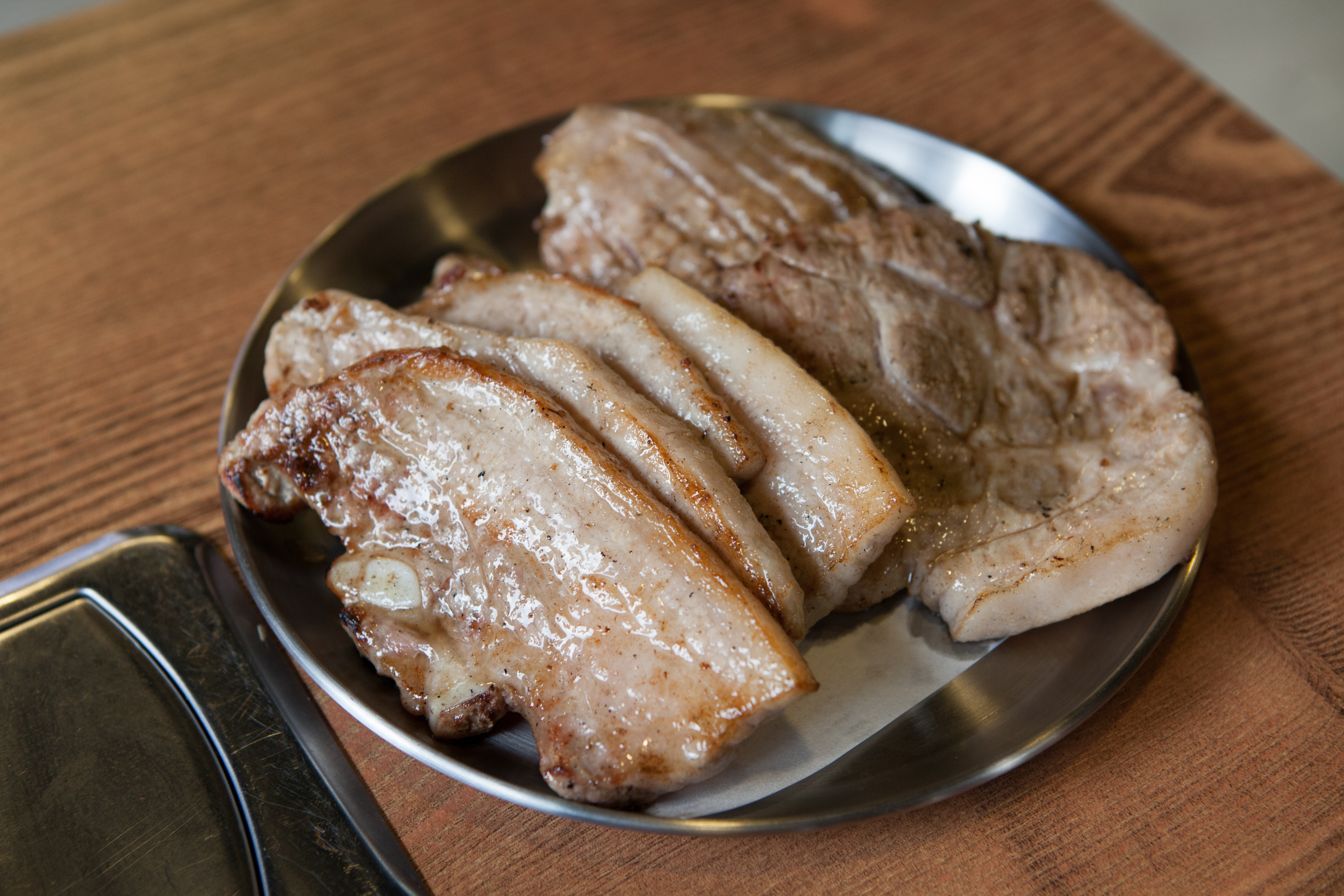
- Alternative names: Samgyeopsal-gui; Grilled pork belly
- Type: Gui
- Place of origin: Korea
- Associated cuisine: Korean cuisine
- Main ingredients: Pork belly

Korean name
- Hangul: 삼겹살
- Hanja: 三겹살
- RR: samgyeopsal
- MR: samgyŏpsal
- IPA: [sam.ɡjʌp.s͈al]

Alternate name
- Hangul: 삼겹살구이
- Hanja: 三겹살구이
- RR: samgyeopsalgui
- MR: samgyŏpsalgui
- IPA: [sam.ɡjʌp.s͈al.ɡu.i]

Samgyeopsal (Korean: 삼겹살; pronounced [sam.ɡjʌp.s͈al]; lit. 'three-layer meat'), samgyeopsal-gui (삼겹살구이; lit. 'grilled three-layer meat'), or grilled pork belly is a type of gui (grilled dish) in Korean cuisine.

== Etymology ==
Directly translated from Korean, samgyeop-sal (삼겹살) means "three layer flesh", referring to striations of lean meat and fat in the pork belly that appear as three layers when cut.

It is the part of the abdomen under the loin from the 5th rib or 6th rib to the hind limb. In Korea, the word samgyeop-sal, meaning "pork belly", often refers to samgyeop-sal-gui (grilled pork belly), in the same way that the word galbi, meaning "ribs", often refers to galbi-gui (grilled beef ribs). Gui refers to roasted, baked, or grilled dishes.

One can also find ogyeopsal (오겹살), with an o meaning "five" and "gyeop" meaning a layer. Ogyeop-sal includes the skin part of the pork belly, unlike samgyeop-sal where the skin is removed.

== History ==
The first mention of the meat dish was in a The Dong-A Ilbo article published on November 3, 1984, titled "How to Distinguish Between Good and Bad Meat", where the dish is called segyeopsal (세겹살) instead of samgyeopsal. The word samgyeopsal only became an entry for the Standard Korean Language Dictionary after 1994.

Until the 1980s, the main type of meat the Koreans preferred was beef, but pork and chicken meat were encouraged at a national policy level as a good alternative as most of the cattle were used for agriculture and thus beef supplies were deficient. In response to government policies, chaebols, especially Samsung, started to run pork farms. Samsung later shut down the farms due to backlash from farmers worried that Samsung was attempting real estate speculation.

During the late 1980s to the 1990s, the dish became a popular menu item along with Jokbal and sundae, as Samsung and Lotte entered the meat processing industry. The use of pork in traditional Korean cuisine such as Bossam or jeyuk-bokkeum focused on methods of hiding its smell with strong seasoning using spices such as ginger, garlic, and leek. After the smell problem was solved by scientific methods such as castration of pigs at the production level, the popularization of samgyeopsal became possible. In 1996, "daepae samgyeopsal", a samgyeopsal that is named because it is thinly cut like it was cut by a Plane (a tool to cut wood, called "daepae" in Korean), was invented. The Hoesik culture after the 1998 financial crisis also popularized the dish as part of the South Korean office cuisine. During the 2000s, beoljip samgyeopsal, which was named as such because the way the meat is cut resembled a beehive (beoljip in Korean) appeared. From 2005, the Jeju Island culture of providing bigger portions of meat in geun (a traditional Korean unit that is equivalent to 600g) instead of 100 grams, and the popularization of Jeju Black pig meat influenced the samgyeopsal culture.

== Preparation ==
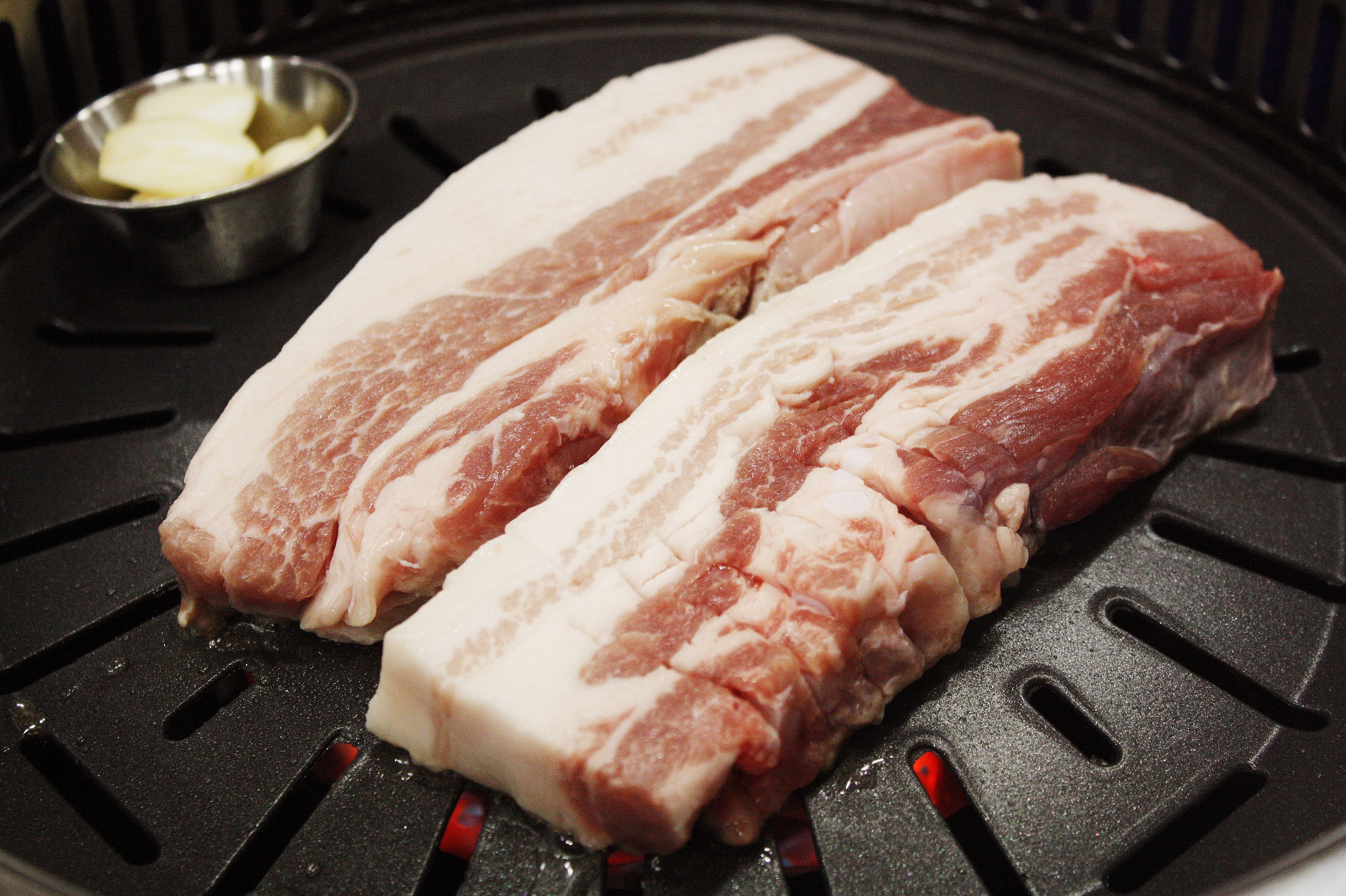
Samgyeopsal on a charcoal grill

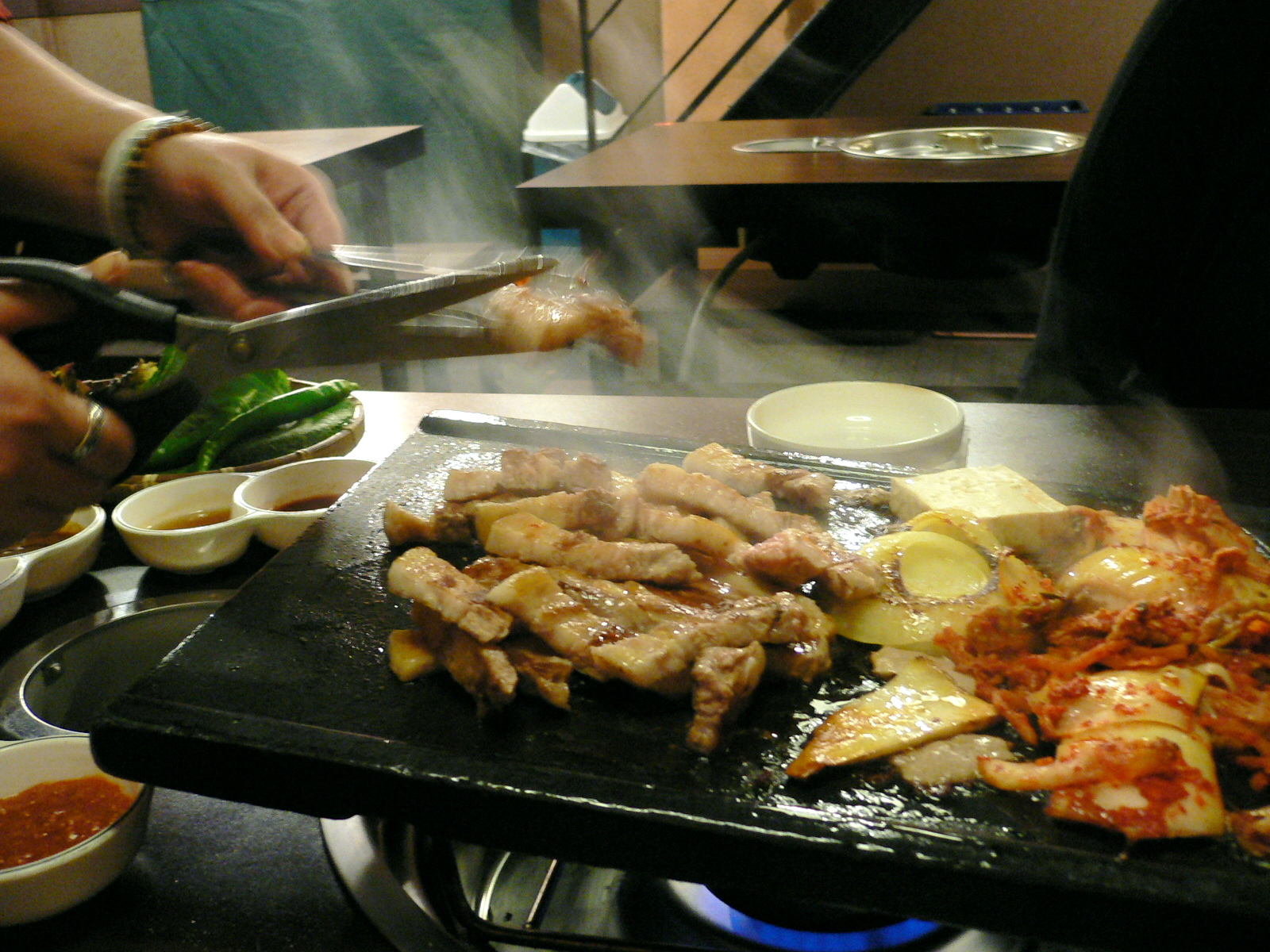
Cooked samgyeopsal being cut with scissors

Thick, fatty slices of pork belly, sometimes with the skin left on and sometimes scored on the diagonal, are grilled on a slanted metal griddle or a gridiron at the diners' table, inset with charcoal grills or convex gas burners. Usually, diners grill the meat themselves, flipping and cutting them with tongs and scissors, and eat directly from the grill.

The meat is usually neither marinated nor seasoned, although marinated samgyeopsal in flavors such as ginseng, wine, garlic, herbs, curry, doenjang, and gochujang has gained popularity since the late 2000s. Slices of garlic, onions, green chili peppers, mushrooms, and kimchi are often grilled alongside using the fat trickling from the pork belly.

Common accompaniments for samgyeopsal include ssam vegetables such as lettuce, kkaennip (perilla leaves), ssammu (pickled radish paper) and dipping sauces such as ssamjang (made with seasoned mixture of chili paste and soy bean paste) and gireum-jang (made with sesame oil, salt, and black pepper), jangajji (soy sauce-pickled vegetables) such as myeongi-jangajji (pickled Siberian onion leaves) or yangpa-jangajji (pickled onions), kimchi, as well as sliced garlic, onions, and seasoned shredded scallions. Garlic, onions, and kimchi can be either grilled with the meat or consumed raw with the cooked meat. Mushrooms, such as button mushrooms or oyster mushrooms, are also grilled with the meat.

== Consumption ==
Grilled meat is placed on fresh and/or pickled leaves of vegetables, with some ssamjang, and rolled up to make ssam (wrap) which is eaten in one mouthful. Any combination of accompaniments mentioned above can be added to the roll according to preference, most popularly sliced garlic.

Cooked rice, stews such as kimchi-jjigae and doenjang-jjigae, as well as naengmyeon (cold noodles), can be served as meals. Sometimes, leftover meat is mixed with rice, gim-garu (seaweed flakes), and seasonings to make bokkeum-bap (fried rice) at the end.

Samgyeopsal is often accompanied by, or accompanying (as anju) shots of soju. Somaek, a simple cocktail made by dumping a shot of soju into a glass of beer, is also a popular beverage consumed with samgyeopasal.

== In culture ==
In South Korea, March 3 is "Samgyeopsal Day", due to samgyeopsal's three-layered composition. According to a 2006 survey by National Agricultural Cooperative Federation, 85% of South Korean adults stated that their favourite slice of pork is the pork belly.

There is a myth in South Korea that eating samgyeopsal protects humans from air pollution by particulates (미세먼지; lit. 'fine dust'). This is thought to have originated from the practice of Korean miners eating pork after an intensive mining operation. Contrary to the myth, samgyeopsal can rather help the absorption of chemicals in the particulates that are soluble in oil.

== See also ==
- Bacon – Type of salt-cured pork
- Korean barbecue – Regional style of food preparation
- List of pork dishes
