= Dubu (disambiguation) =

Dubu is the Korean word for tofu, a food made from coagulated soy milk.

Dubu or may also refer to:

- Dubu language, a language in West New Guinea

== See also ==
- Dubu-kimchi, a Korean dish
