= Corn cheese =

South Korean cuisine

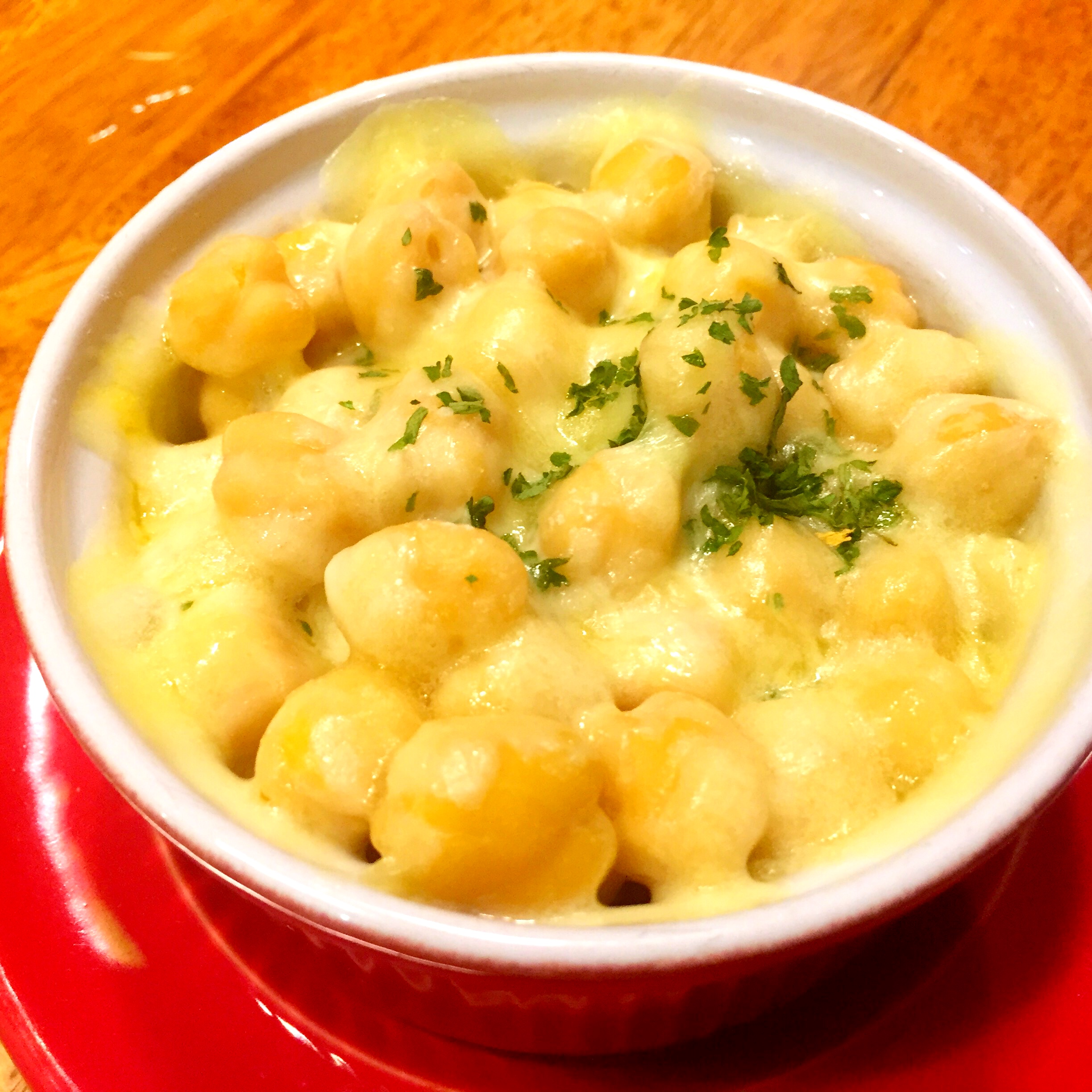
- Course: anju
- Place of origin: South Korea
- Associated cuisine: South Korean cuisine
- Serving temperature: hot to warm
- Main ingredients: sweet corn, mozzarella cheese
- Ingredients generally used: butter, mayonnaise, onion, bell pepper

Corn cheese (Korean: 콘치즈) is a South Korean dish made of sweet corn (often canned) and mozzarella cheese.

== Preparation ==
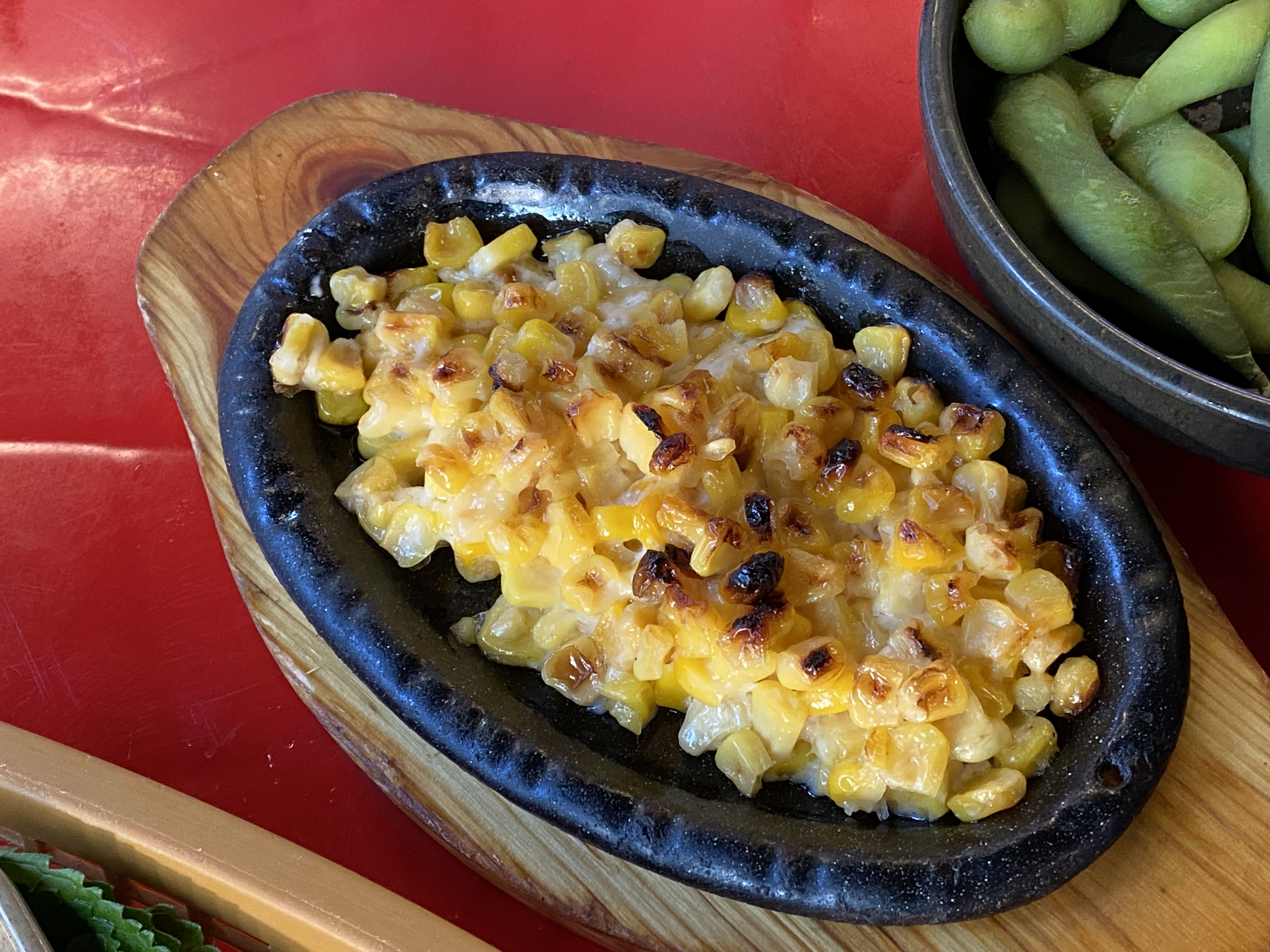
Corn cheese, served on a hot plate and browned

Sweet corn kernels are sautéed with butter on a skillet, optionally with vegetables such as onions or bell peppers that are diced to be of similar size to the corn kernels. If any vegetables are used, they should be lightly salted and have their excess moisture removed. Mayonnaise and optionally sugar is mixed in, and mozzarella cheese (often shredded) is added over the sautéed corn mixture. It is then broiled in an oven until the cheese browns. In restaurant settings, it is often served sizzling in a hot dish.

=== Variations ===
Some chefs have also experimented with adding alternative ingredients, such as Chinese mustard and doenjang. In 2015, it was reported that a Korean American restaurant in California served a corn cheese dish that featured bone marrow and bonito flakes.

It has also been combined with instant ramen, notably Hot Chicken Flavor Ramen. According to one article from the Korea Economic Daily, after the ramen is finished, the corn cheese should be added on top and microwaved for an additional minute and 30 seconds. One article noted that the cheese helped to counteract the spiciness of the original ramen.

It has also been used as a stuffing for gyoza.

== Pairings and serving ==
It is often served as anju (food accompanying alcoholic beverages), although it has also been described as "kid-friendly". It is also eaten alongside Korean barbecue.

The food is also served as street food.

== See also ==
- Dried shredded squid (another anju)
- Esquites (a similar Mexican dish that sometimes contains cheese)
