= South Korean =

South Korean may refer to:

- Something of, from, or related to South Korea, a country in East Asia, in the southern half of the Korean Peninsula. For information about the South Korean people, see:
  - Demographics of South Korea
  - Culture of South Korea
- The Korean language as spoken in South Korea

== See also ==
- Koreans
- South Korean cuisine
