= Dubu-kimchi =

Korean tofu and stir-fried kimchi dish

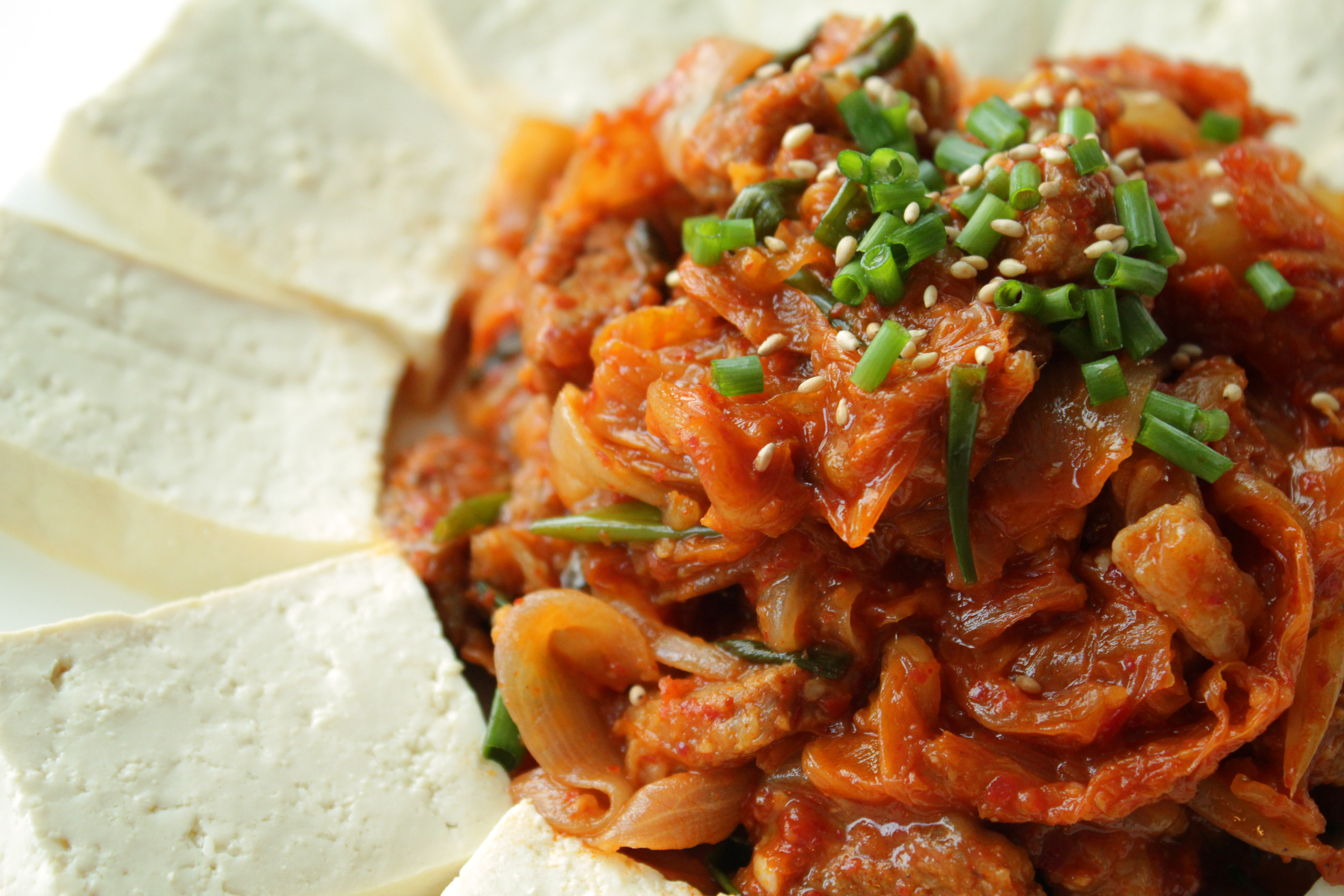
- Alternative names: Dubu-gimchi
- Place of origin: Korea
- Associated cuisine: Korean cuisine
- Main ingredients: Tofu (dubu), kimchi, pork

Korean name
- Hangul: 두부김치
- Hanja: 豆腐김치
- RR: dubugimchi
- MR: tubugimch'i
- IPA: tu.bu.ɡim.tɕʰi

Dubu-kimchi (Korean: 두부김치; pronounced [tu.bu.ɡim.tɕʰi]) is a Korean dish consisting of tofu (dubu) and stir-fried kimchi. Soft, warm, blanched tofu is served with well-fermented, tangy baechu-kimchi (napa cabbage kimchi) stir-fried with pork. It is considered a well-matched anju (accompaniments to alcoholic drinks) for either soju or makgeolli.

== Preparation ==
Well-fermented baechu-kimchi (napa cabbage kimchi) is sliced into bite size pieces, while the pork is sliced into similar shape and size of kimchi and marinated with gochujang, soy sauce, gochutgaru (chili powder), grated ginger, minced garlic, and sugar. Onions are sliced into strips, and green chili peppers are sliced on the diagonal. The marinated pork is stir-fried in a pan coated with cooking oil, then the kimchi, the green chili, the onions, and a drizzle of sesame oil are added sequentially. Mo-dubu (firm tofu) is blanched, sliced into rectangles, and served with the stir-fried kimchi and pork when hot. Toasted sesame seeds are often sprinkled on top.

== See also ==
- List of tofu dishes
- Banchan
- Hanjeongsik
- North Korean cuisine
- South Korean cuisine
- List of Korean dishes
