= Esquites =

Corn-based Mexican street food dish

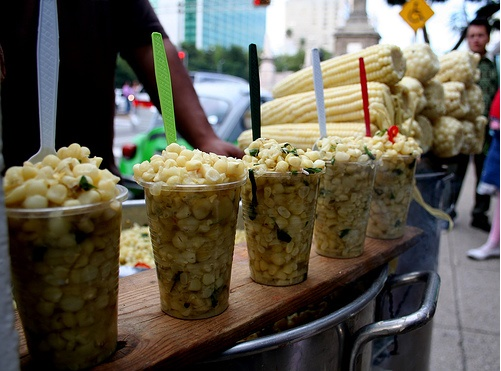
Esquites

Esquites (or ezquites) (troles and trolelotes in Northeast Mexico, chasca in Aguascalientes, vasolote in Michoacán, etc.) also known as elote en vaso (corn in a cup), also served in the Southwestern USA, is a Mexican snack or antojito. One can find them at local markets, and street vendors selling corn. The word esquites comes from the Nahuatl word ízquitl, which means "toasted corn".

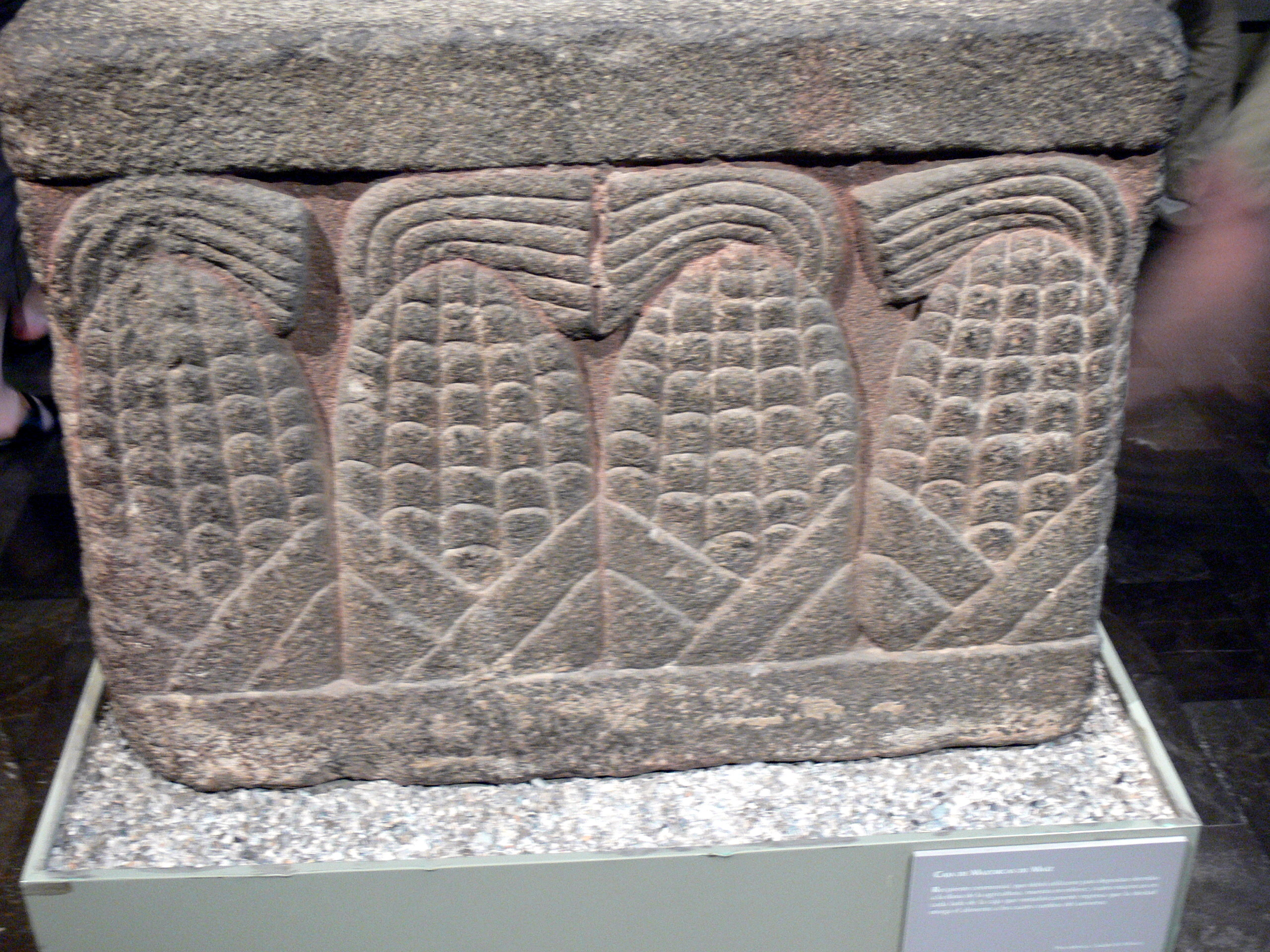
National Museum- Caja de Mazorca de Maiz

== Origin ==
Although its true origin is not known, it is a common understanding that esquites are historically a common Mexican street food. According to Nahuatl stories, esquites are credited as being created by the deity Tlazocihuapilli of Xochimilco, who is also credited with creating Mexican atole and corn jelly.

There is an alternative origin story that claims that in the late 1800's, Emperor Maximilian I of Mexico and Empress Charlotte of Belgium created a dish referred to as "Odalisque Teeth", when they accidentally used corn flour instead of wheat. The modern day esquite is known as a Mestizo preparation because many of its fundamental ingredients (not including corn) were from Spain.

== Ingredients ==
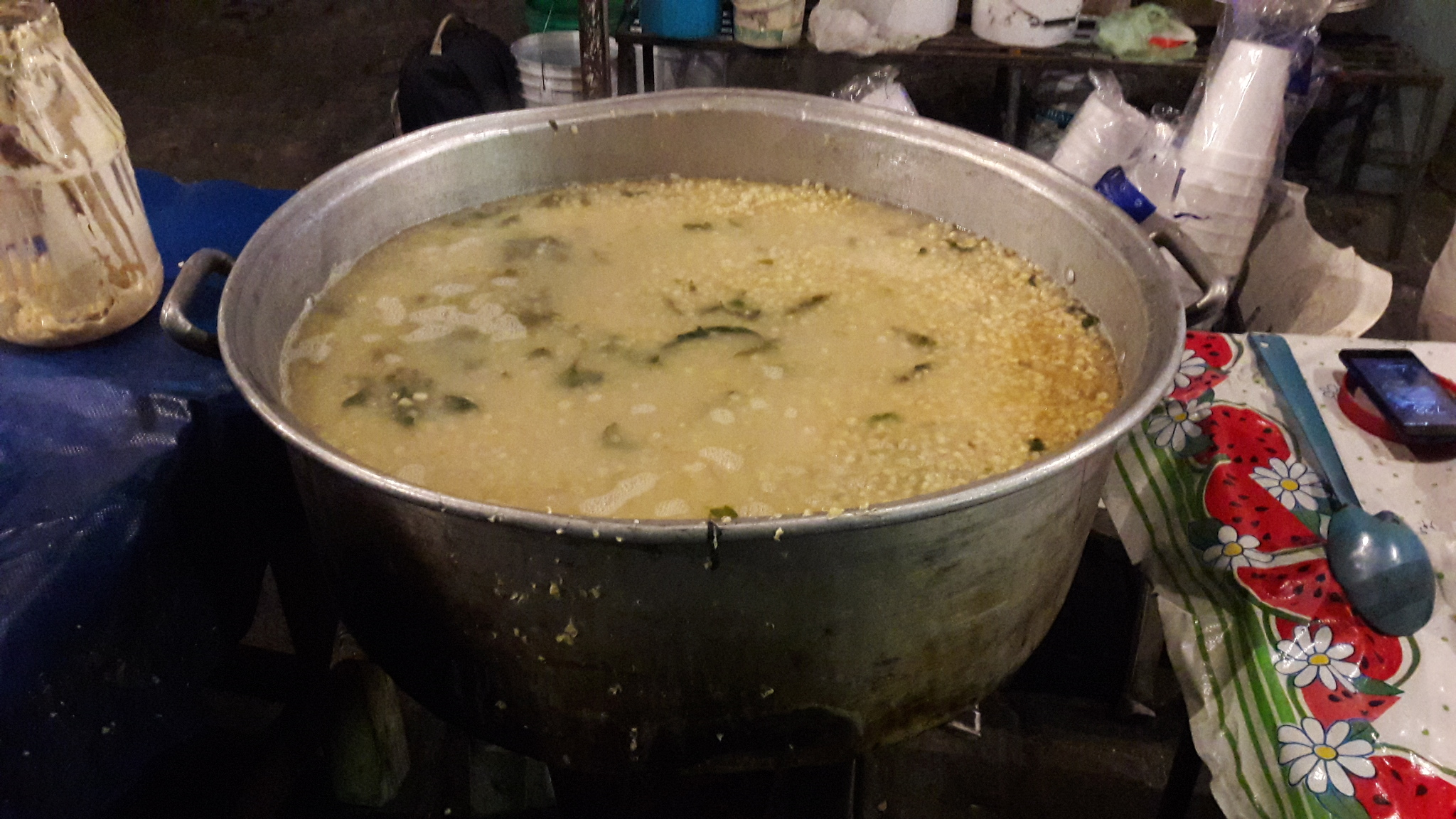
White corn boiled for esquites

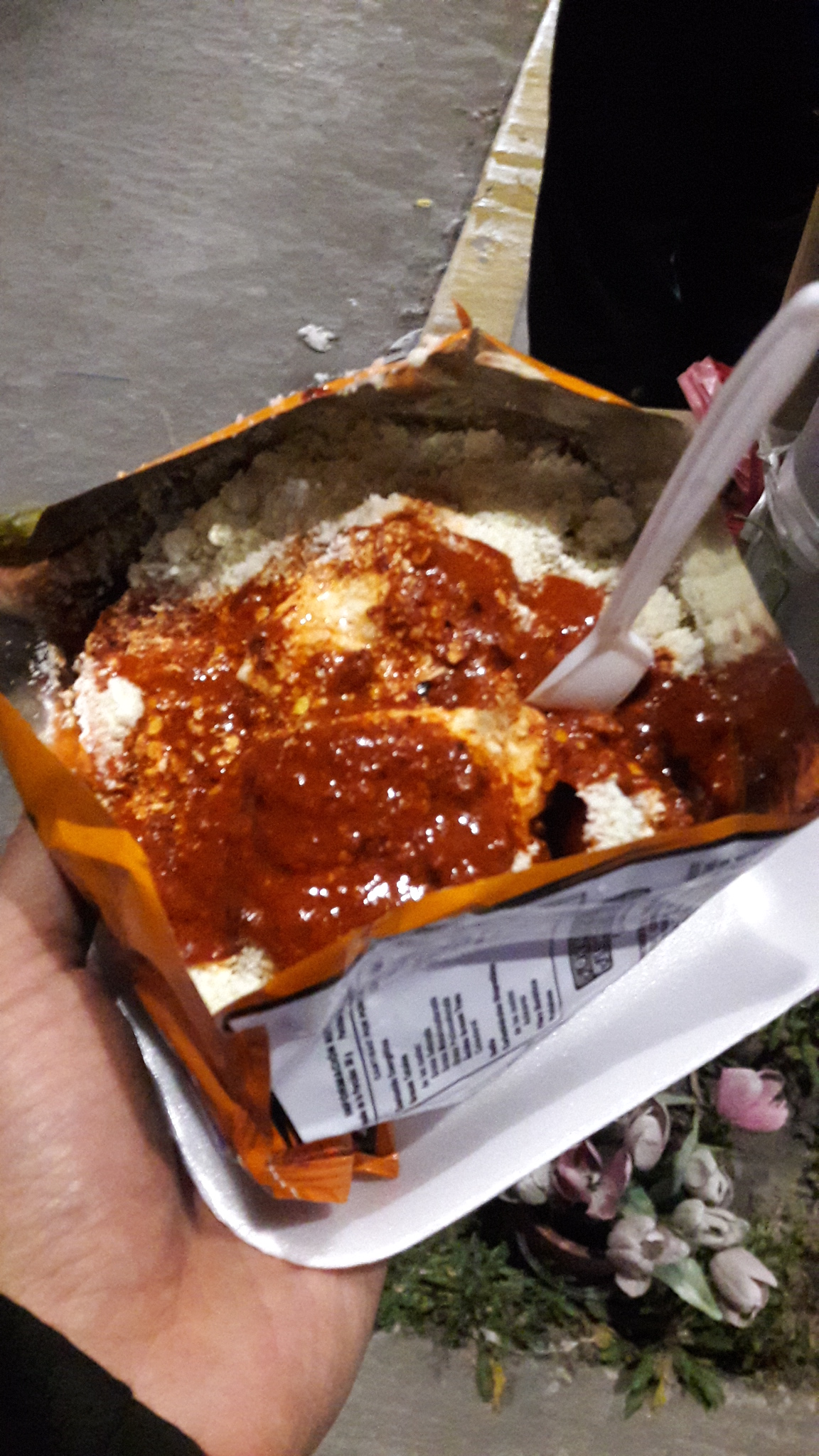
Esquite made in Flamin' Hot Cheetos bag

Esquites are generally made from white corn kernels that have been boiled and softened in water, which typically contains salt and epazote. Sometimes the corn is also sauteed in butter and onions after it has been boiled. The white corn kernels are first boiled until soft and tender in large pots and served in plastic or styrofoam cups, hence the name in English, "corn in cup". One can additionally find them being served in corn husks. The ingredients can vary; toppings for esquites include (but are not limited to) combinations of lime juice, chili powder or hot sauce, salt, Cotija cheese, and mayonnaise. In places like Mexico City they are sometimes also topped with Mexican Chapulines or crickets.

A popular modern-day variation is to top the corn with blended Flamin' Hot Cheetos or Takis. New variations include all the same ingredients but mixed in with a chip bag of choice.

== See also ==
- Elote
- Maize
- Corn cheese
