= Anju (food) =

Korean term for food eaten with alcohol

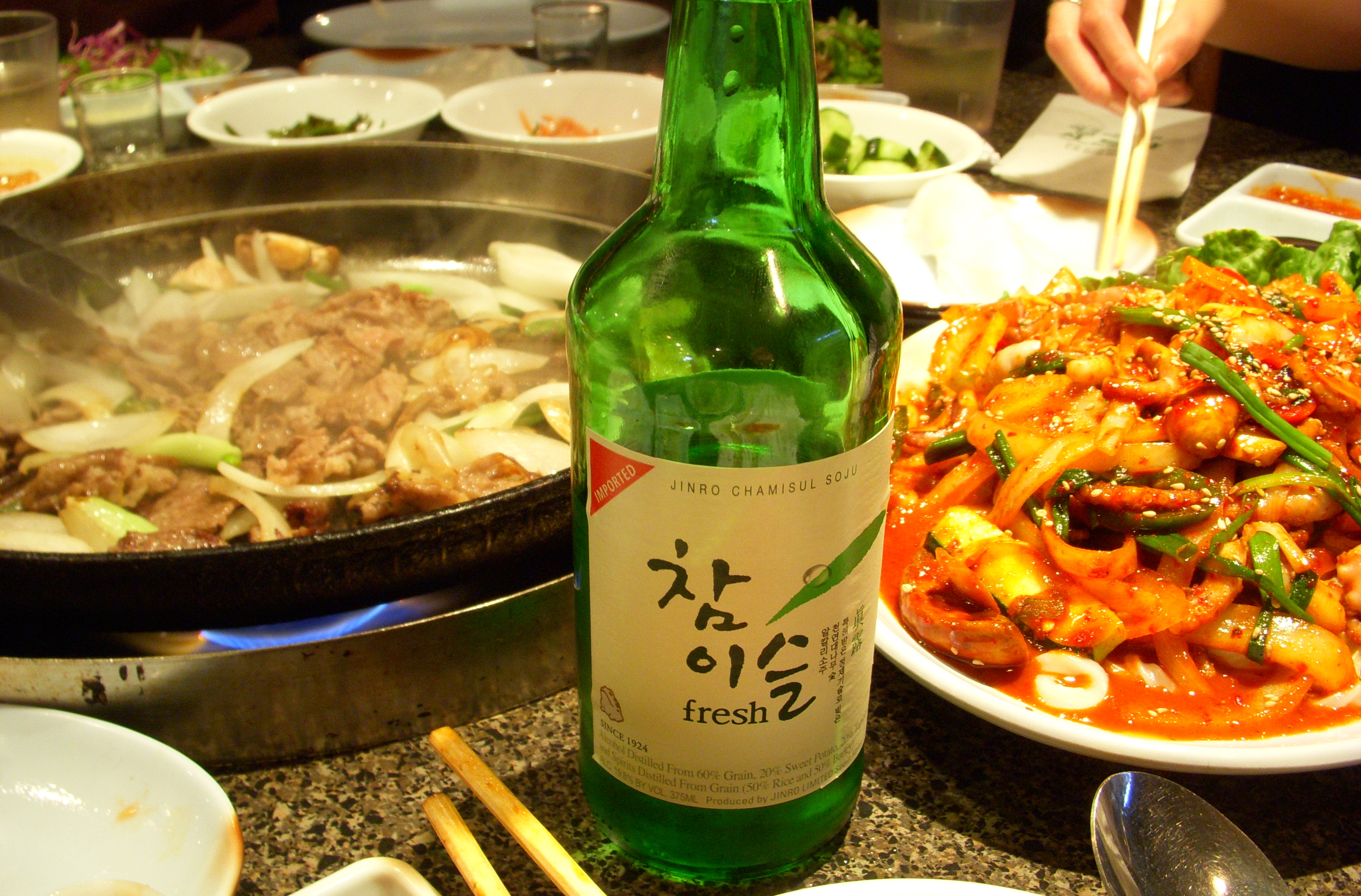
- Bulgogi and nakji bokkeum being served as anju along with soju
- Main ingredients: various

Korean name
- Hangul: 안주
- Hanja: 按酒
- RR: anju
- MR: anju

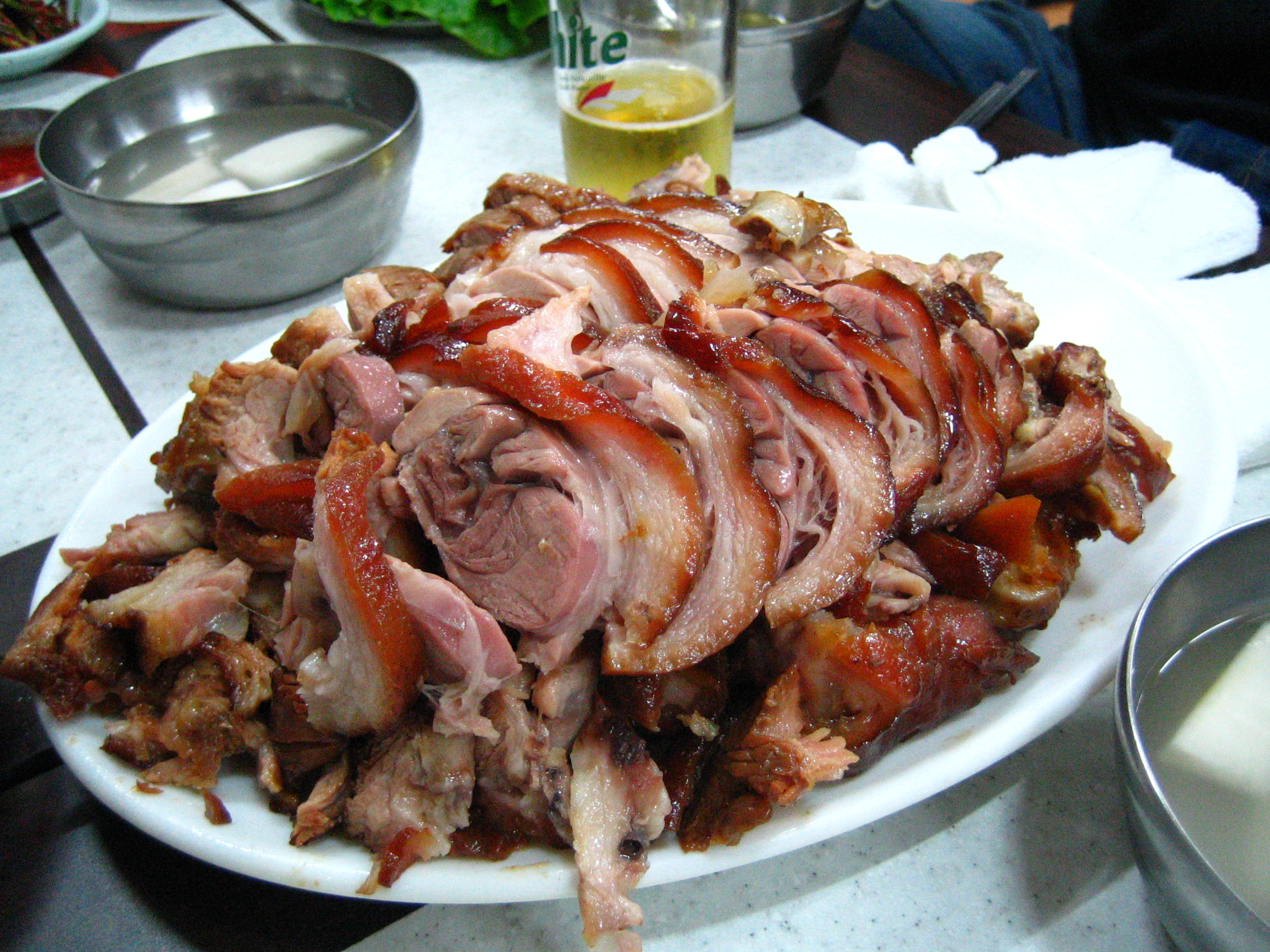
Jokbal, boiled pig's feet in soy sauce, similar to Eisbein in German cuisine

Anju (Korean: 안주; Hanja: 按酒; pronounced [an.dʑu]) is a Korean term for food consumed with alcohol. It consists of a variety of foods, including both main dishes and side dishes. Consuming food with alcohol is a widespread practice in Korea, especially when the alcoholic beverage soju is involved.

Certain types of foods consumed primarily as anju include golbaengi muchim, nogari with peanuts, and jokbal.

== History ==
Until the Joseon period, alcohol was mainly served in jumaks (a type of inn or tavern), where soups with rice, along with traditional alcohol such as makgeolli, were served to guests. Since the introduction of beer and Western foods into Korea, mainly from Japan in the nineteenth century, bars and pubs have enjoyed a newfound popularity, and many types of Western foods have been consumed as anju.

== By types of beverage ==
Some foods are considered to be best complemented by certain types of alcohol. For example, samgyeopsal, grilled pork belly, is considered to go best with soju, while fried chicken or Korean seasoned chicken goes well with beer. Pajeon and makkeoli (or dongdongju) is a popular combination for rainy days.

| | Dry | Soupy or spicy | Other |
|---|---|---|---|
| Beer | dried nogari, dried shredded squid, jwipo, seasoned nuts, semi-dried squid, yukpo | | corn cheese, fried chicken, pizza, twigim, sausage |
| Cheongju | bugak, dasik, jeonggwa | | bulgogi, hanu-gui, namul, jeon, jeongol, saengseon-hoe, sanjeok, yukhoe |
| Makgeolli | | dubu-kimchi, golbaengi-muchim, kimchi, Dak-galbi | bindae-tteok, bossam, buchimgae, dotori-muk-muchim, hongeo-samhap, jeoneo-hoe, kimchi-buchimgae, mak-guksu, pajeon, raw oyster |
| Soju | | agwi-jjim, budae-jjigae, dakbal, eomuk-tang, gamja-tang, jogae-tang, jukkumi-bokkeum, kimchi-jjigae, maeun-tang, fish cake-tang | gopchang, makchang, samgyeopsal-gui, jokbal |
| Wine | cheese platter | | steak |

== By the place where alcohol is served ==
There are a number of different types of bar in South Korea, and each category sells different kinds of food and alcoholic beverage.

- Jumak: this does not refer to the traditional Korean inns of the Chosun Dynasty mentioned above, but instead refers to a conceptual bar based on Korean culture. These bars are represented by traditional anju such as pa-jun, dubu-kimchi, or dotori-muk.
- Hof house (Korean pronunciation: [ho.pʰɯ ha.u.sɯ]): Hof houses (a German loan word) sell a number of relatively inexpensive alcoholic beverages. Various international dishes are served here as well.
- Pojangmacha: It is a place where tents are placed on the side of the road and snacks and alcohol are sold. Mainly simple side dishes are sold.
- Chimaek: Restaurants which serve fried chicken with beer.

== Sample images ==
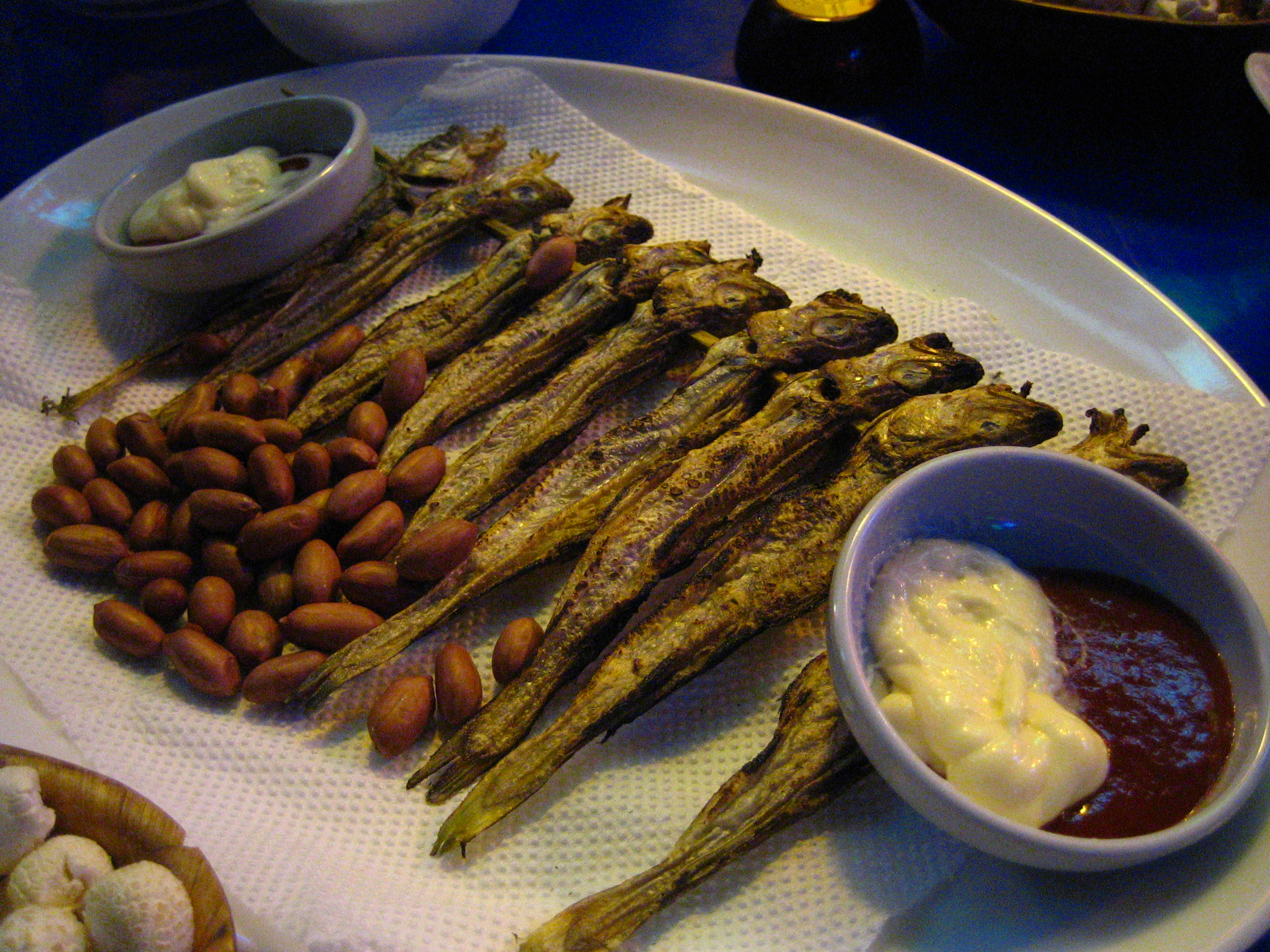
Nogari (young Alaska pollock) with peanuts

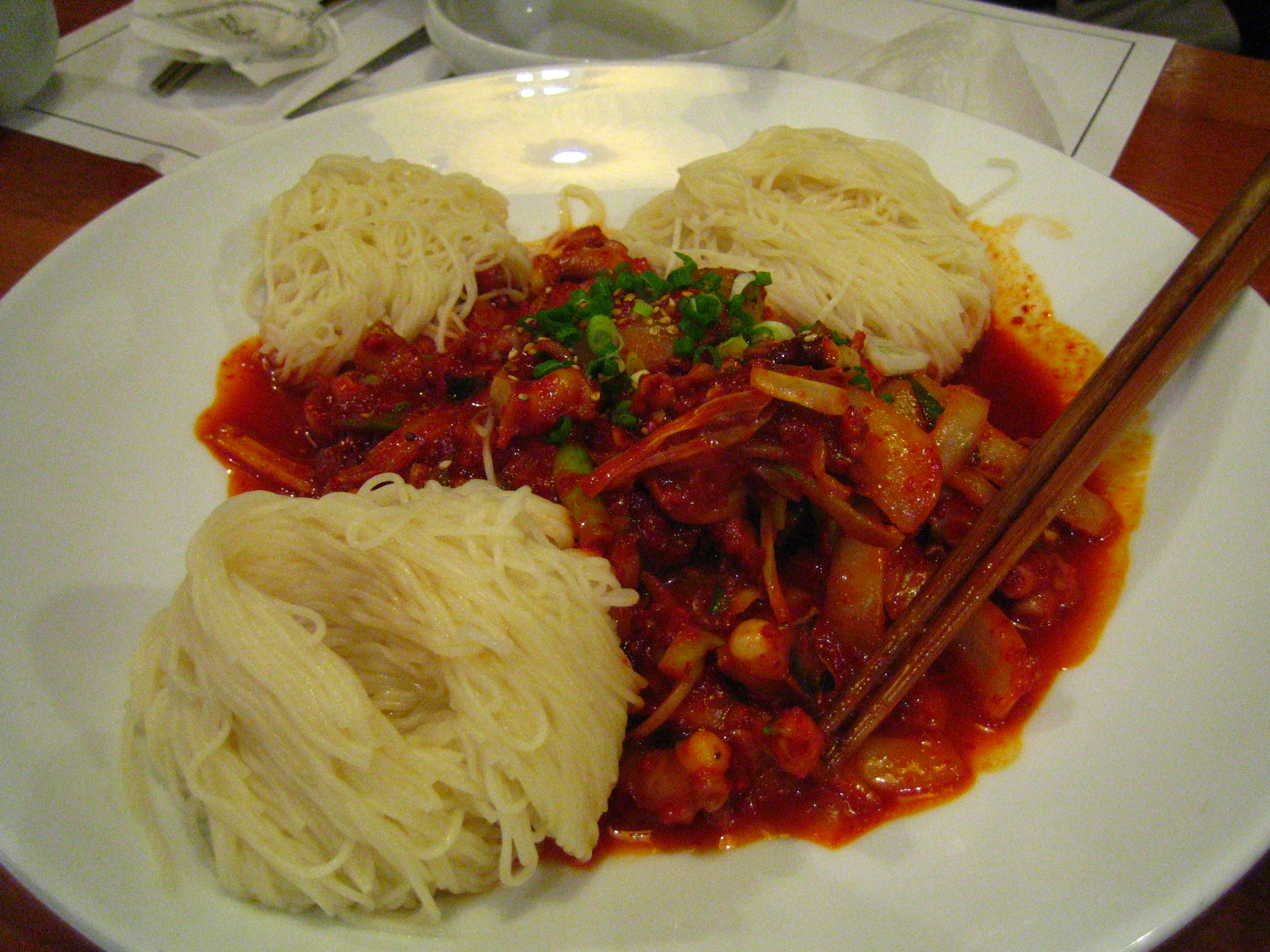
Nakji bokkeum with somyeon (fried octopus in gochujang with fine noodles)

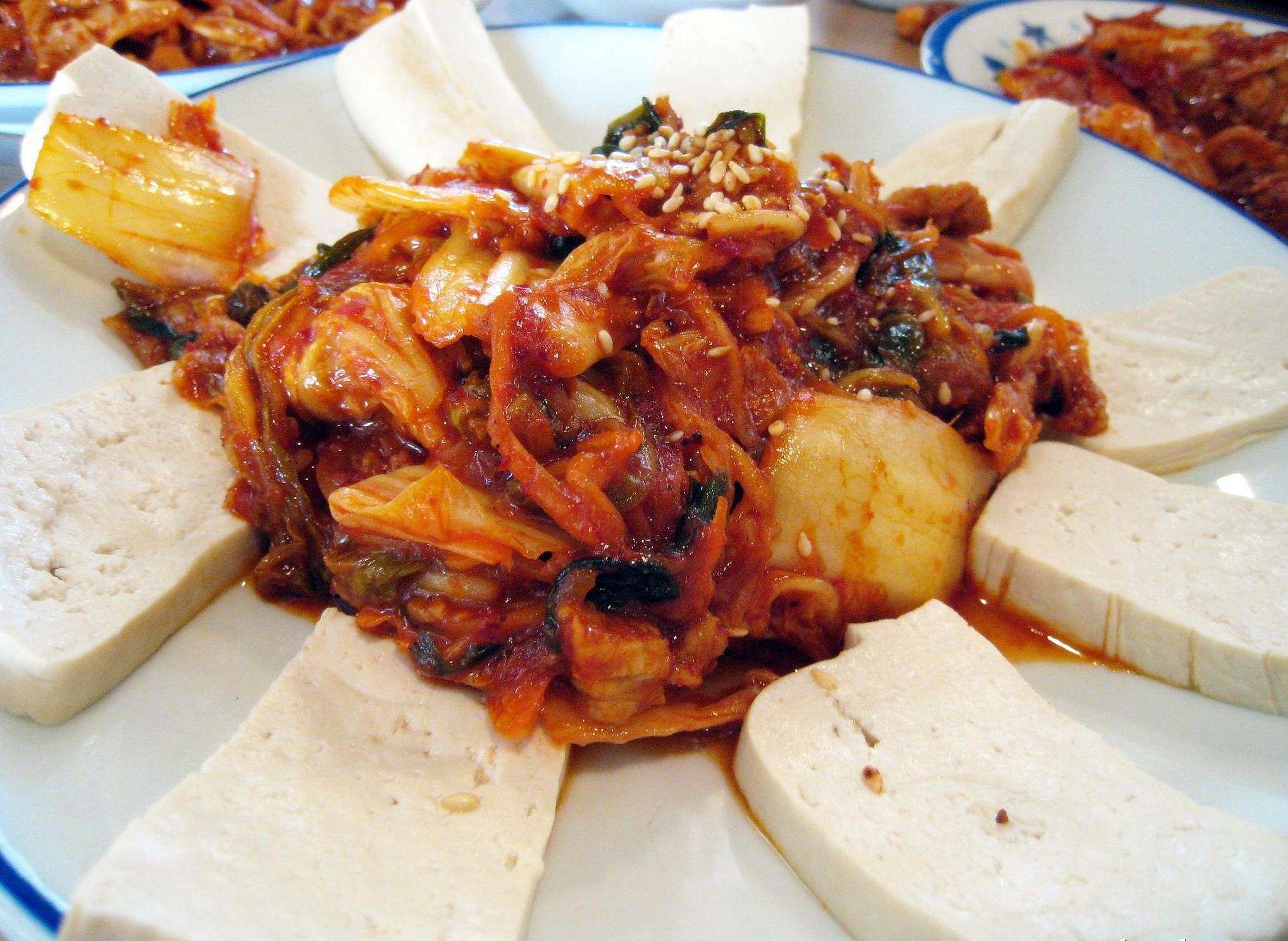
Dubu kimchi

== See also ==
- Kap klaem – Thai term for food consumed with alcohol
- Meze – Small dish in Middle Eastern and Balkan cuisines
- Pulutan – Culinary traditions of the Philippines
- Pusas – Traditional appetiser or snack eaten with alcohol in Sabah, Malaysia
- Sakana – Japanese snacks, eaten with alcohol
- Tapas – Appetiser or snack in Spanish and international cuisine
- Zakuski – Russian term for appetizers served before meals
- Korean alcoholic beverages
