= Jokbal =

Korean pork dish

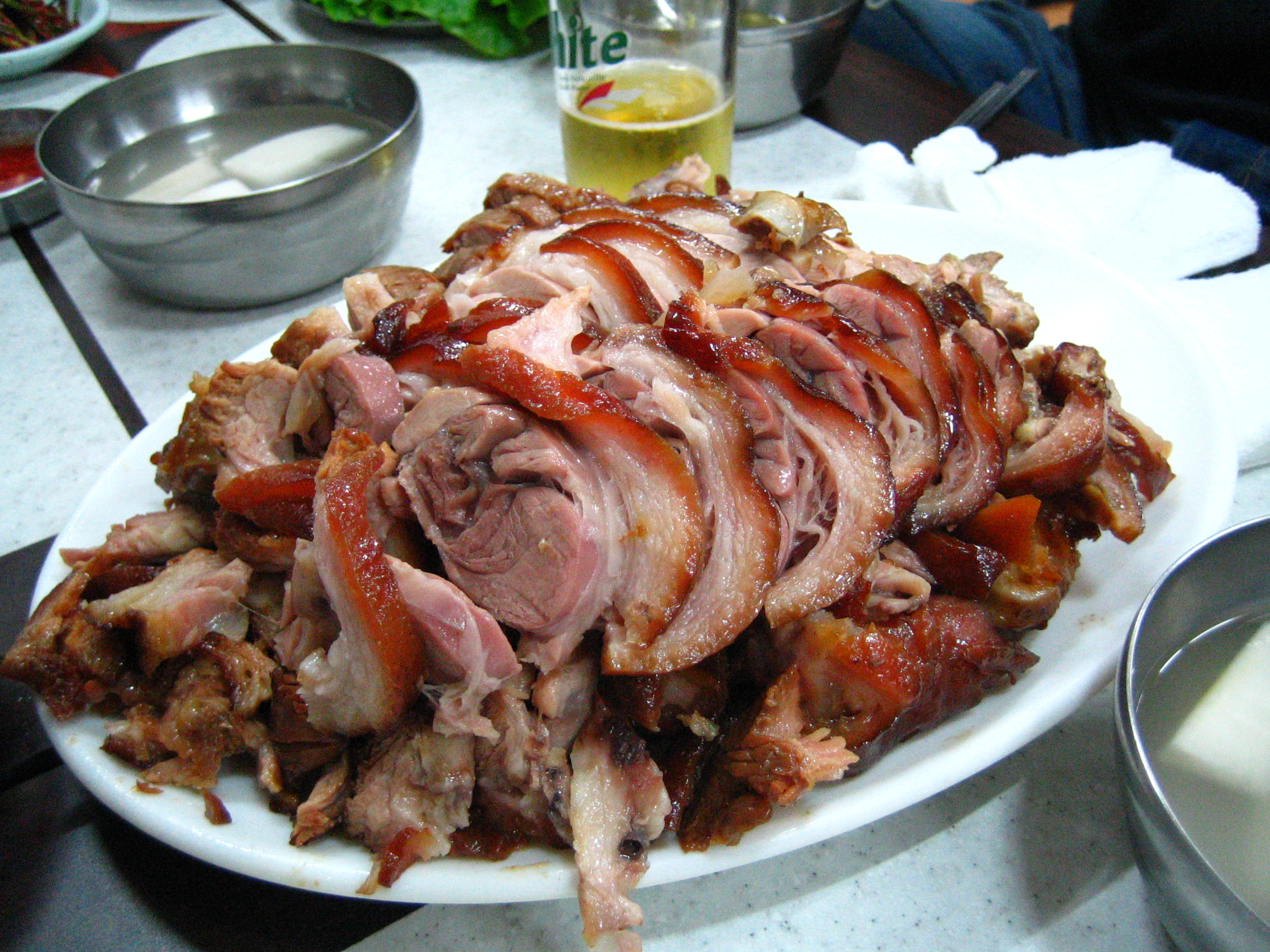
- Sliced jokbal, a popular dish served as anju in South Korea
- Place of origin: Korea
- Associated cuisine: Korean cuisine
- Main ingredients: Pig's trotters

Korean name
- Hangul: 족발
- RR: jokbal
- MR: chokpal

Jokbal (Korean: 족발) is a Korean dish consisting of pig's trotters cooked with soy sauce and spices. It is usually braised in a combination of soy sauce, ginger, garlic, and rice wine. Additional ingredients used can include onion, leeks, garlic, cinnamon, and black pepper.

== History ==
Jokbal is presumed to have originated from braised pork, a local food of Hwanghae Province, where pigs' legs are boiled. The current jokbal is a food that started in Jangchung-dong in the 1960s and is known to have been developed by grandmothers from Pyongan Province and Hwanghae Province for a living. In the 1960s and 1970s, it became widely known through visitors to Jangchung Gymnasium, where professional wrestling games were frequently held.

The etymology of the term jokbal is disputed. The first presumption is that the word jokbal is from word jjokbal (쪽발) meaning cloven hoof and the word jjokbal was pronounced softly to sell as menu and became jokbal. The second presumption is that the Sino-Korean word jok (족; 足) which means foot and the Korean word bal (발) which also means foot was written together on a menu for customers who cannot read Korean and it became a single word.

== Serving ==
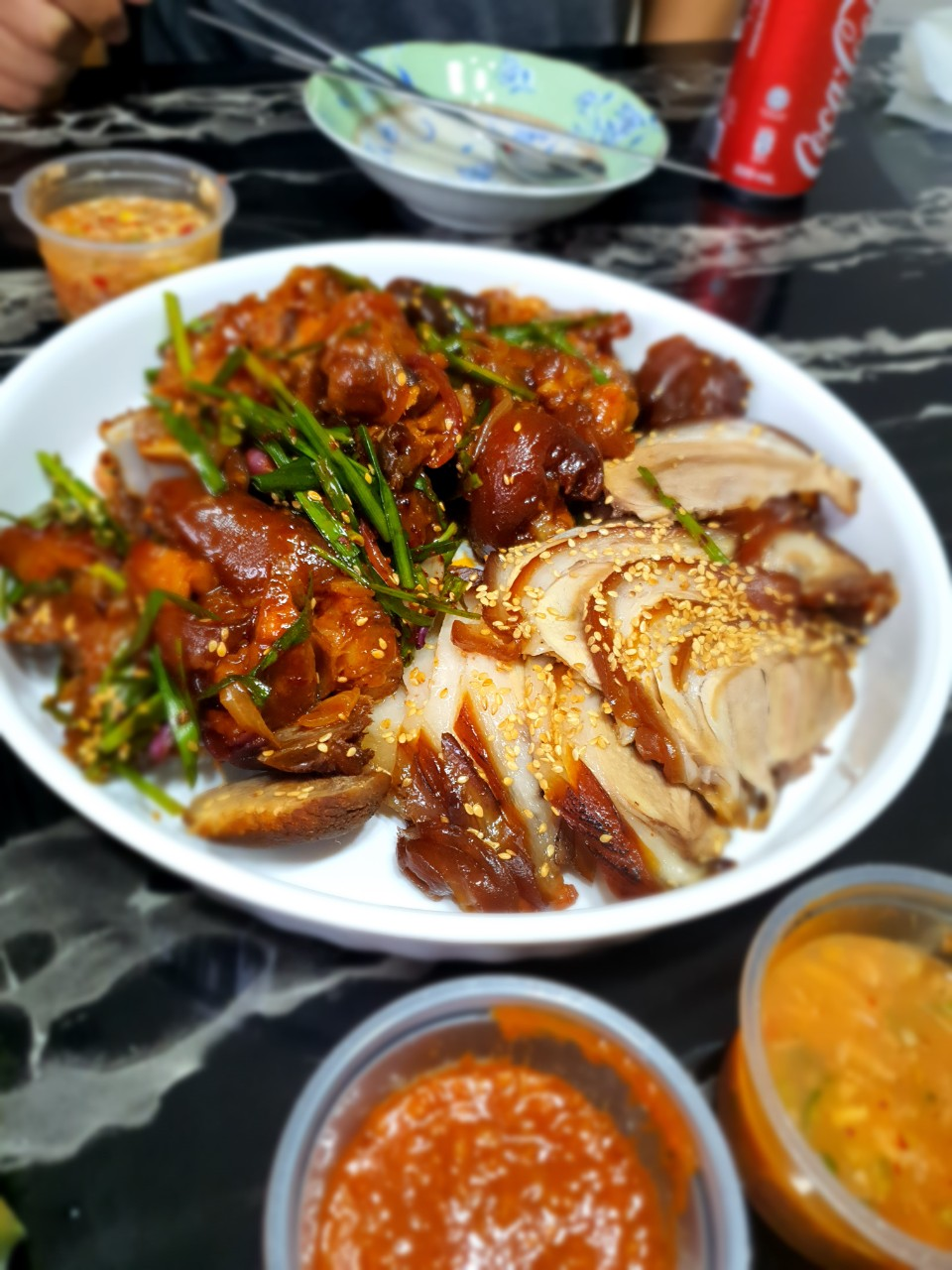
Spicy version of Jokbal

As jokbal is a dish usually shared by several people, it is generally served in large portions, and as it is greasy and has a strong flavour, Korean diners often eat it as ssam, wrapped in a piece of lettuce with sauces and other vegetables. Jokbal is considered an anju and thus is often accompanied with soju. Restaurants serving jokbal frequently offer both a regular and a spicy version of the dish, with especially spicy versions being dubbed buljokbal—literally "fire jokbal". Most also offer other variations, including Busan-style naengchae jokbal, which is served cold and garnished with chilled vegetables.

== Nutrition ==
Jokbal contains a lot of gelatin and is thus said to promote firm, wrinkle-free skin. The amino acid methionine, found in pork, is claimed to counteract the effects of alcohol and prevent hangover. Korean sources also attribute numerous other beneficial effects to pork products like jokbal.

== Jokbal Street ==
The area around Dongguk University Station in Jangchung-dong, Seoul, is known for its numerous jokbal restaurants. The restaurants have long histories, some having been open for as many as 50 years, and all claim to be the "original" jokbal restaurant. Most of the restaurants have opened franchises throughout the country and offer delivery services.

== Gallery ==
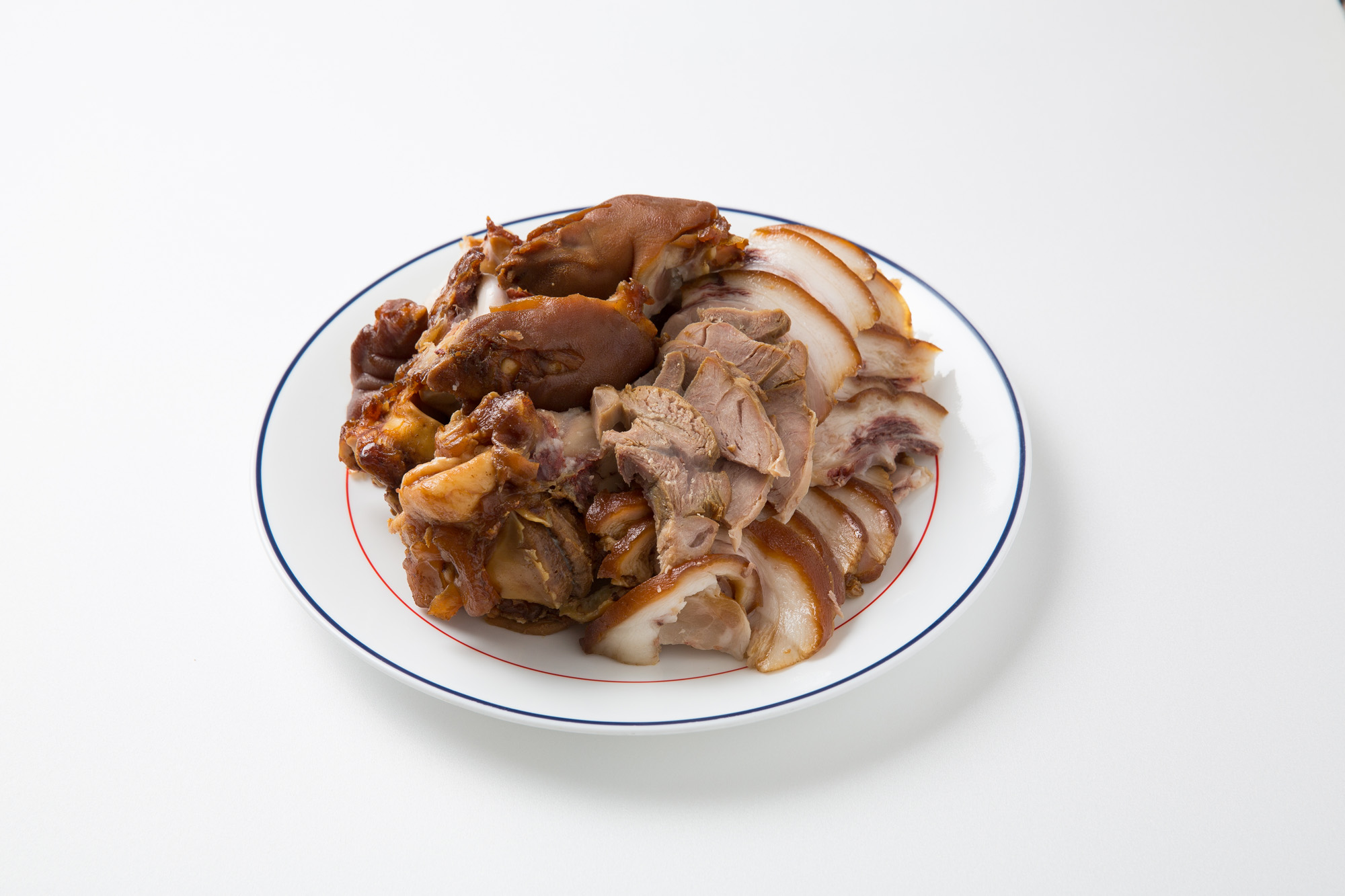
Standard jokbal

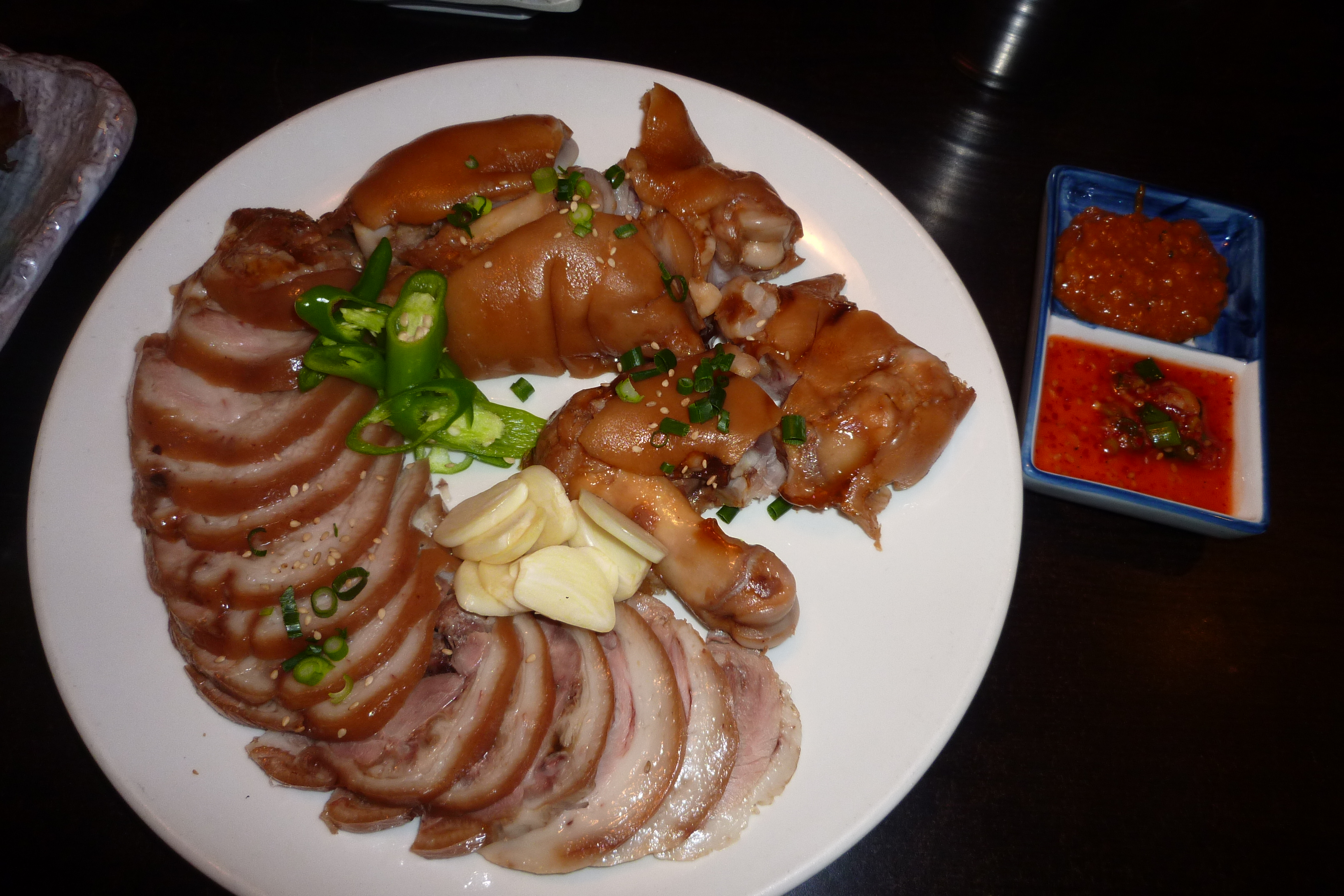
With sauces

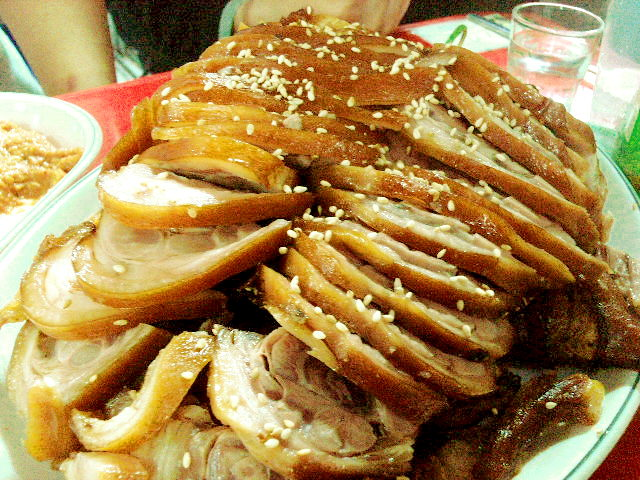

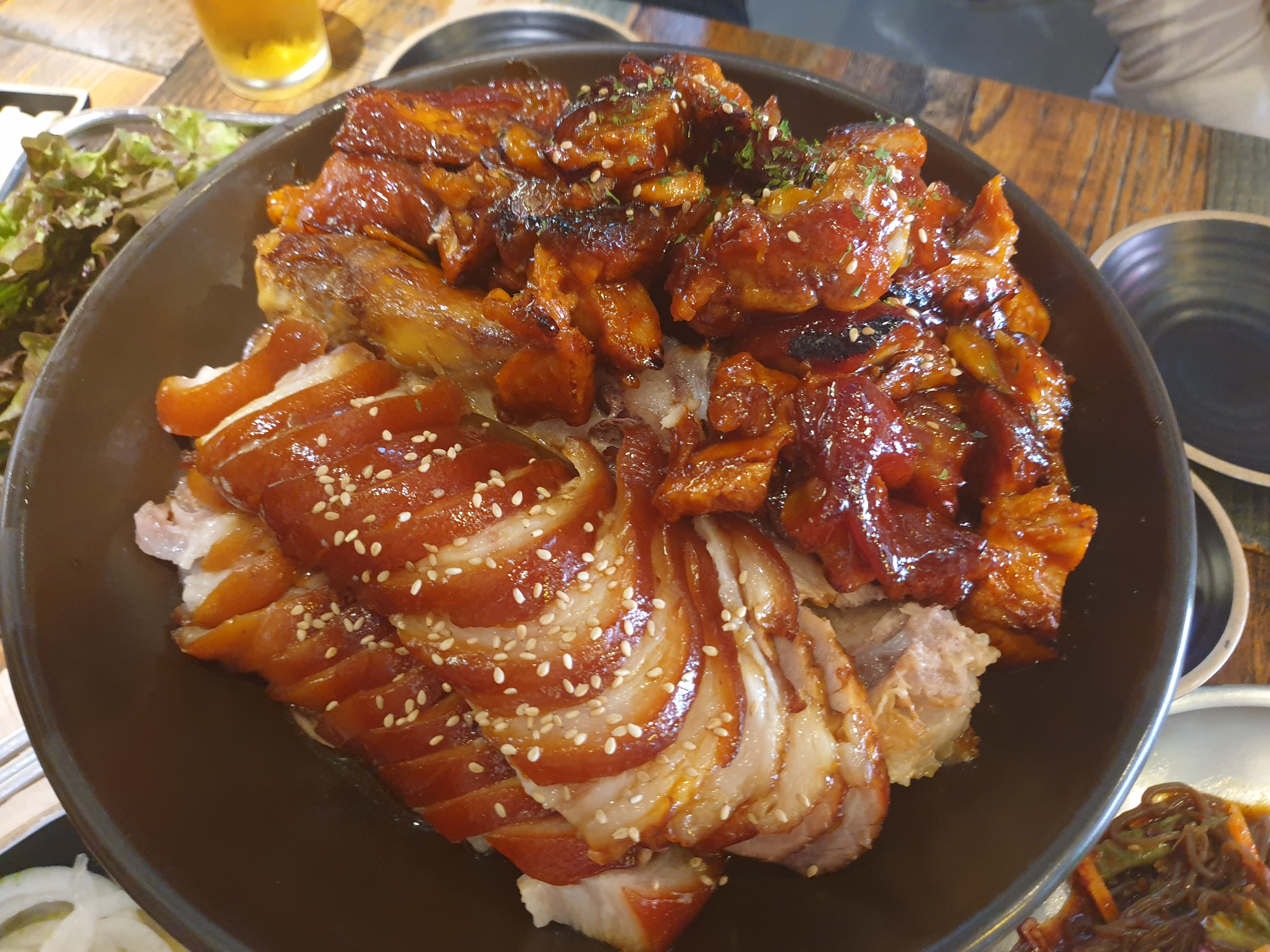

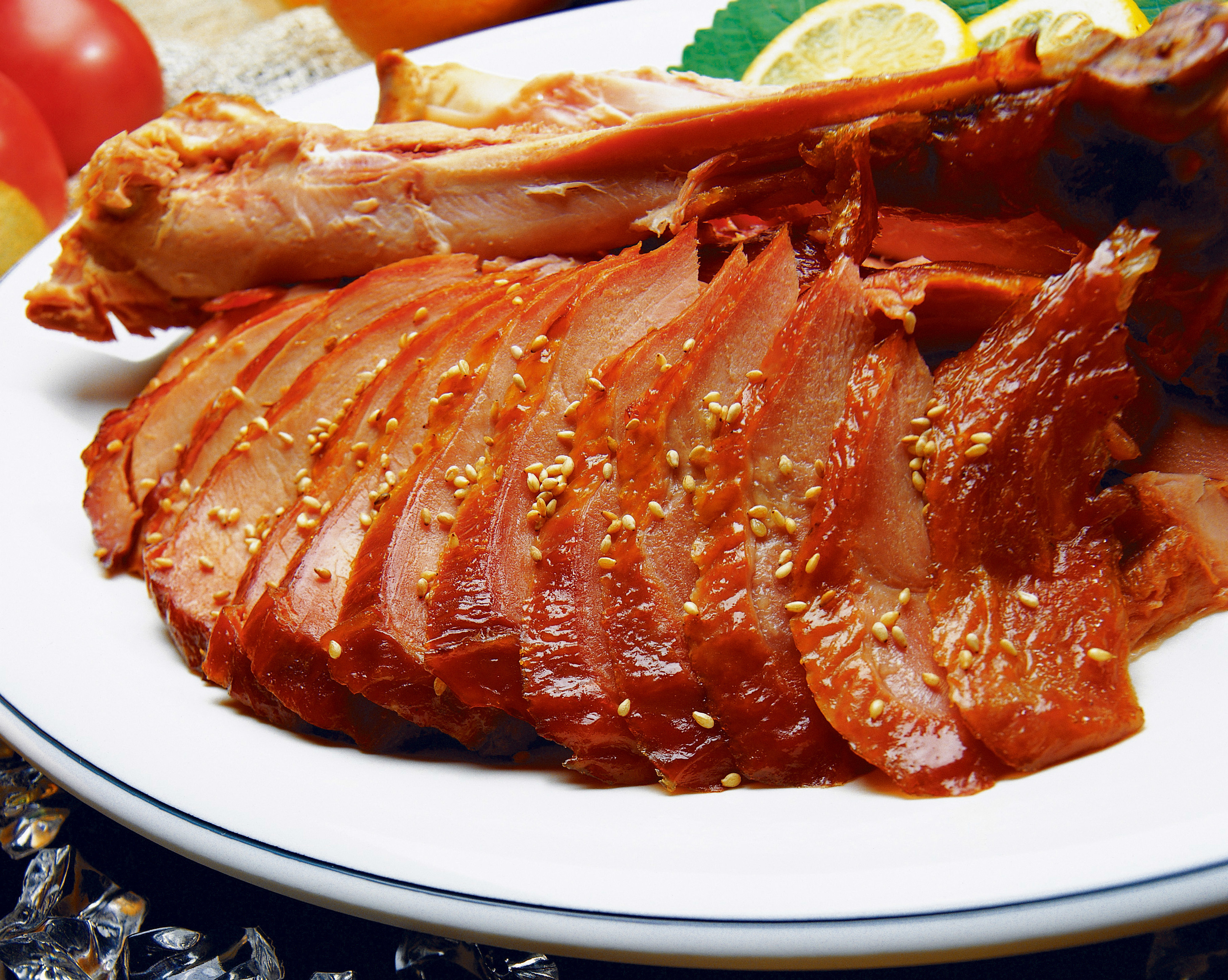

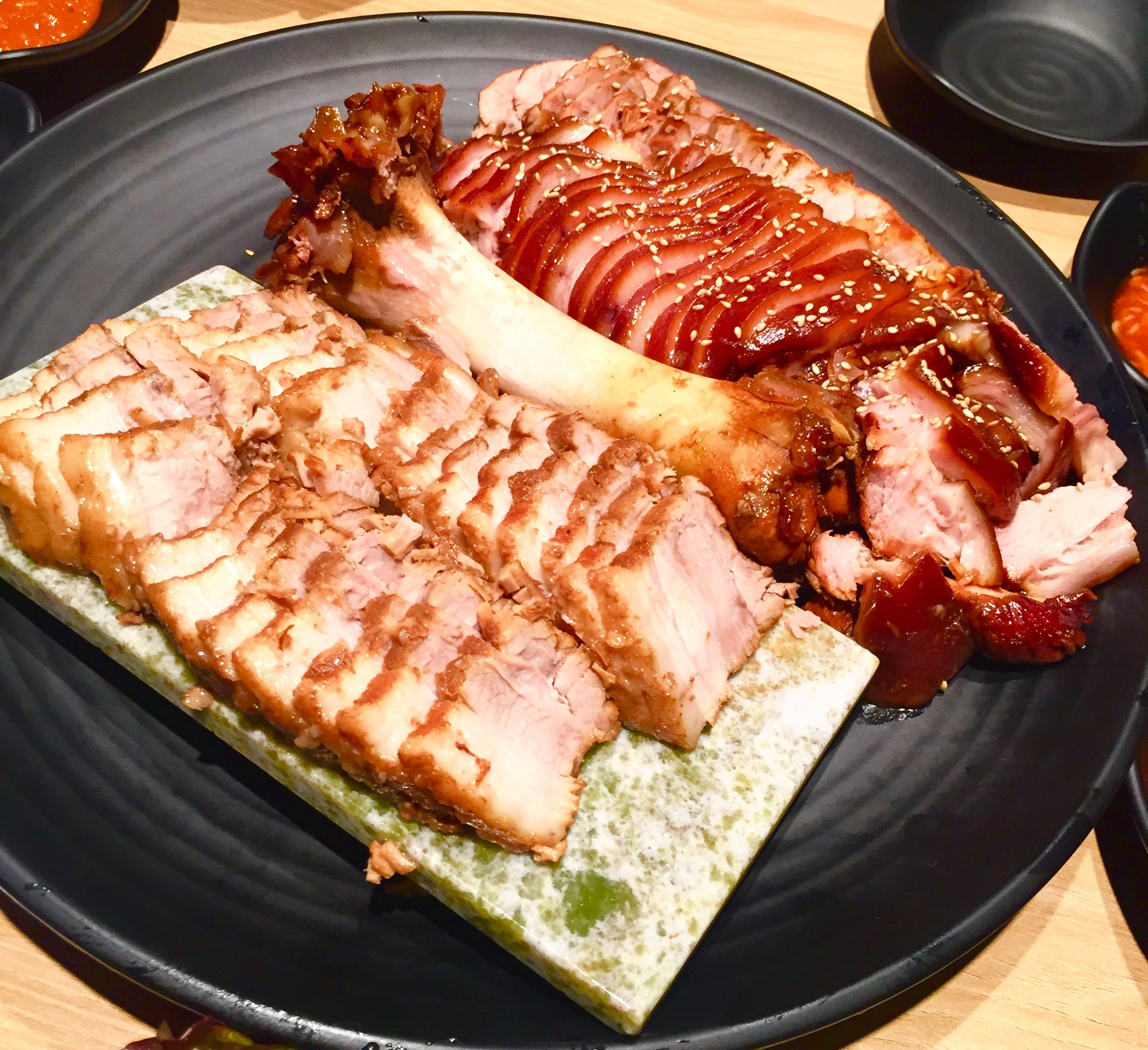
With bossam

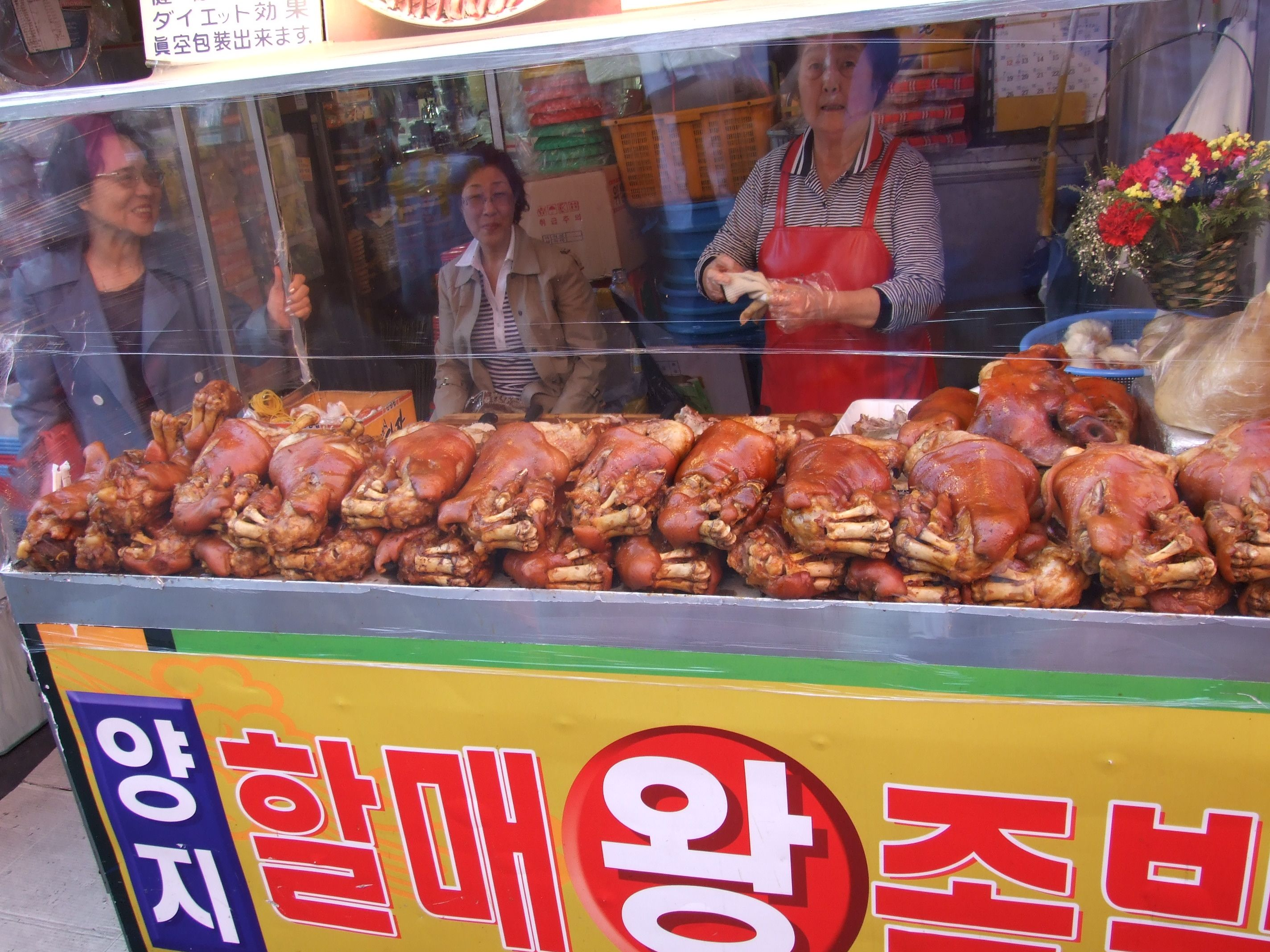
At a vendor in Namdaemun Market

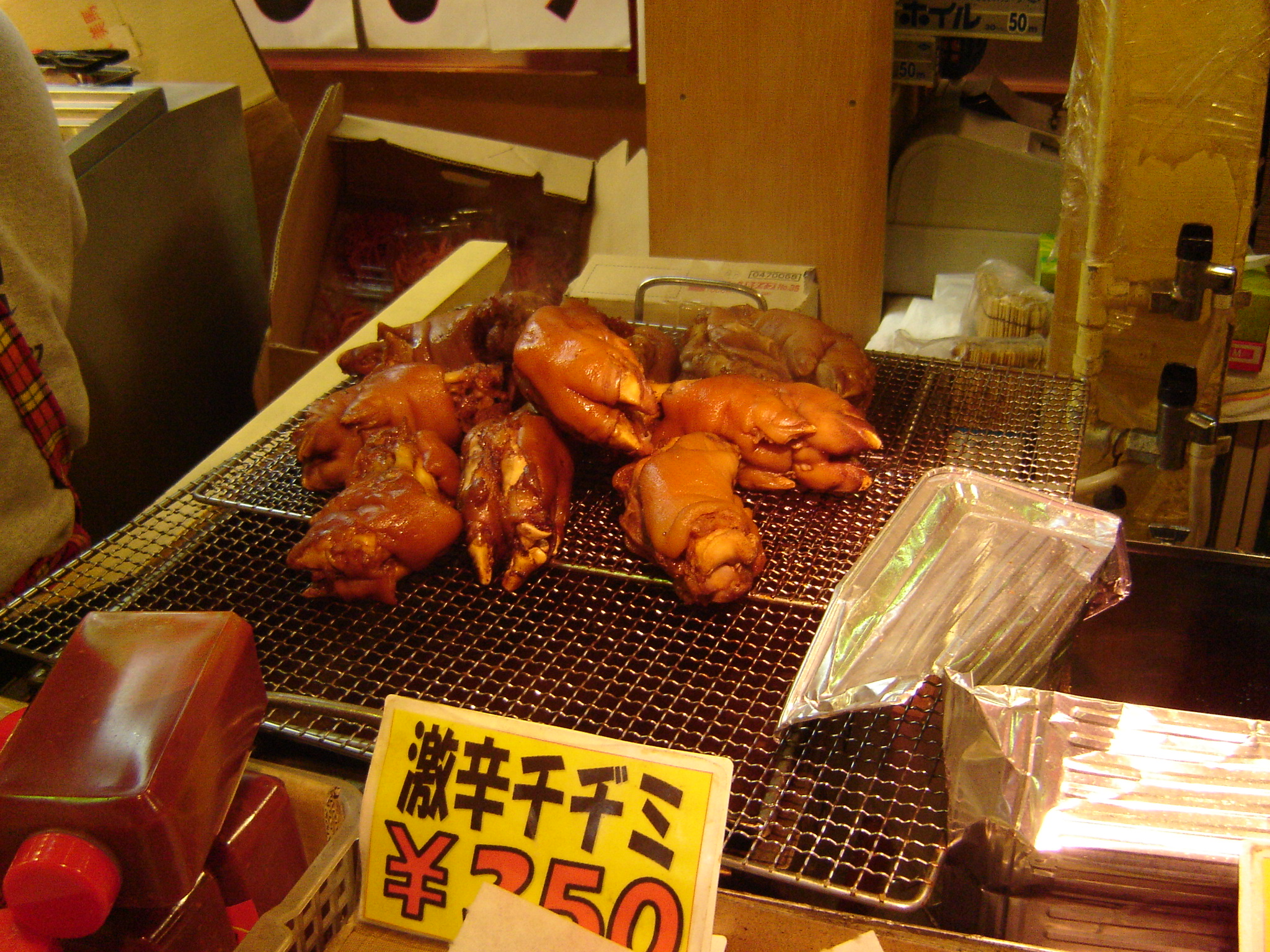
At Korean Town in Osaka, Japan

== See also ==
- Korean cuisine
- Pickled pigs' feet
- Schweinshaxe
