= Bossam =

Korean boiled pork wraps

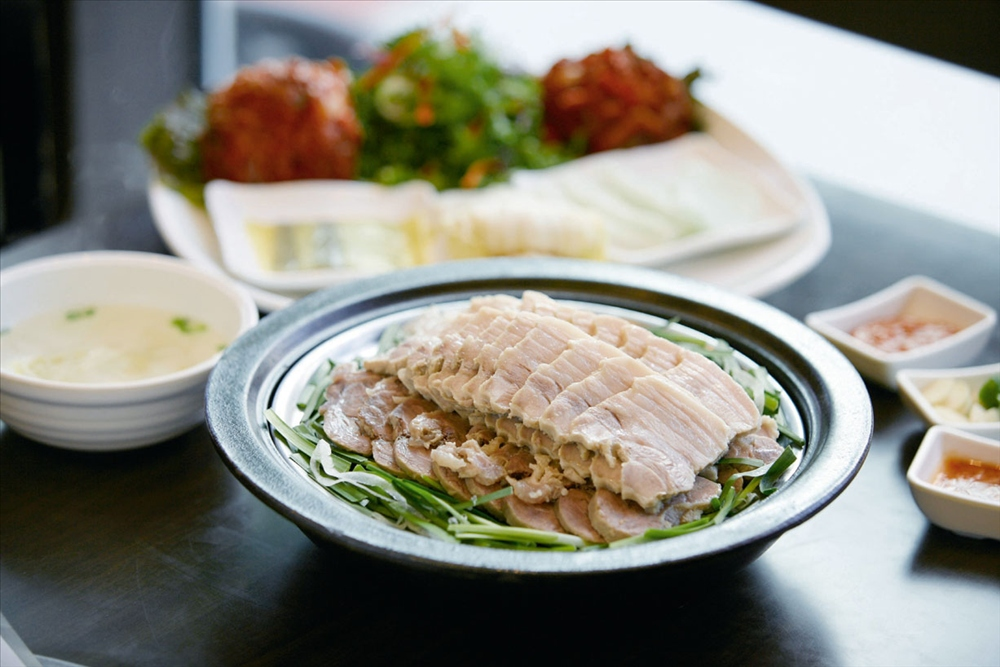
- Place of origin: Korea
- Associated cuisine: Korean cuisine
- Main ingredients: Pork shoulder, belly, or hand

Korean name
- Hangul: 보쌈
- Hanja: 褓쌈
- RR: bossam
- MR: possam
- IPA: po.s͈am

Bossam (Korean: 보쌈) is a pork dish in Korean cuisine. It usually consists of pork belly that is boiled in spices and thinly sliced. The meat is served with side dishes such as spicy radish salad, sliced raw garlic, ssamjang (wrap sauce), saeu-jeot (salted shrimp), kimchi, and ssam (wrap) vegetables such as lettuce, kkaennip (perilla leaves), and inner leaves of a napa cabbage.

Bossam is a popular dish in South Korea, often served as anju (i.e. food accompanying alcoholic drinks). To eat, the meat and side dishes are wrapped together in ssam vegetables, hence the literal meaning of bossam: "wrapped" or "packaged".

== History ==
Bossam is traditionally linked with the process of gimjang, during which large quantities of kimchi are prepared for winters. To ensure the commitment of the workers during this labor-intensive process, yangban (scholar-gentry of the Joseon era) would deliver a pig for a feast. The workers would enjoy boiled pork with some of their newly made kimchi, which, being early in the fermentation process, was a fresh and crispy complement to the soft pork of bossam.

== Preparation ==
Although beef can also be used, pork is preferred for bossam. In the case of pork, pork neck is less fat and lighter than pork belly, so it is better to make bossam. The meat is tied with kitchen twine to hold its shape, and boiled in a broth that contains star anise, ginger, white part and root of scallion, garlic, doenjang (soybean paste), coffee powder, tea leaves, and so on, to reduce the gaminess. When cooked, it is rinsed with cold water, untied, and pressed lightly in a cotton cloth to maintain its shape. When cooled, the meat is sliced into pieces of about 0.3 centimetres (0.12 in) and served with varieties of side dishes, typically including spicy radish salad similar to the kimchi filling, inner leaves of napa cabbages, and freshly made baechu-kimchi (napa cabbage kimchi).

If the meat is served with fresh raw oyster, the dish is called gul-bossam (굴보쌈; "oyster bossam").

== Gallery ==
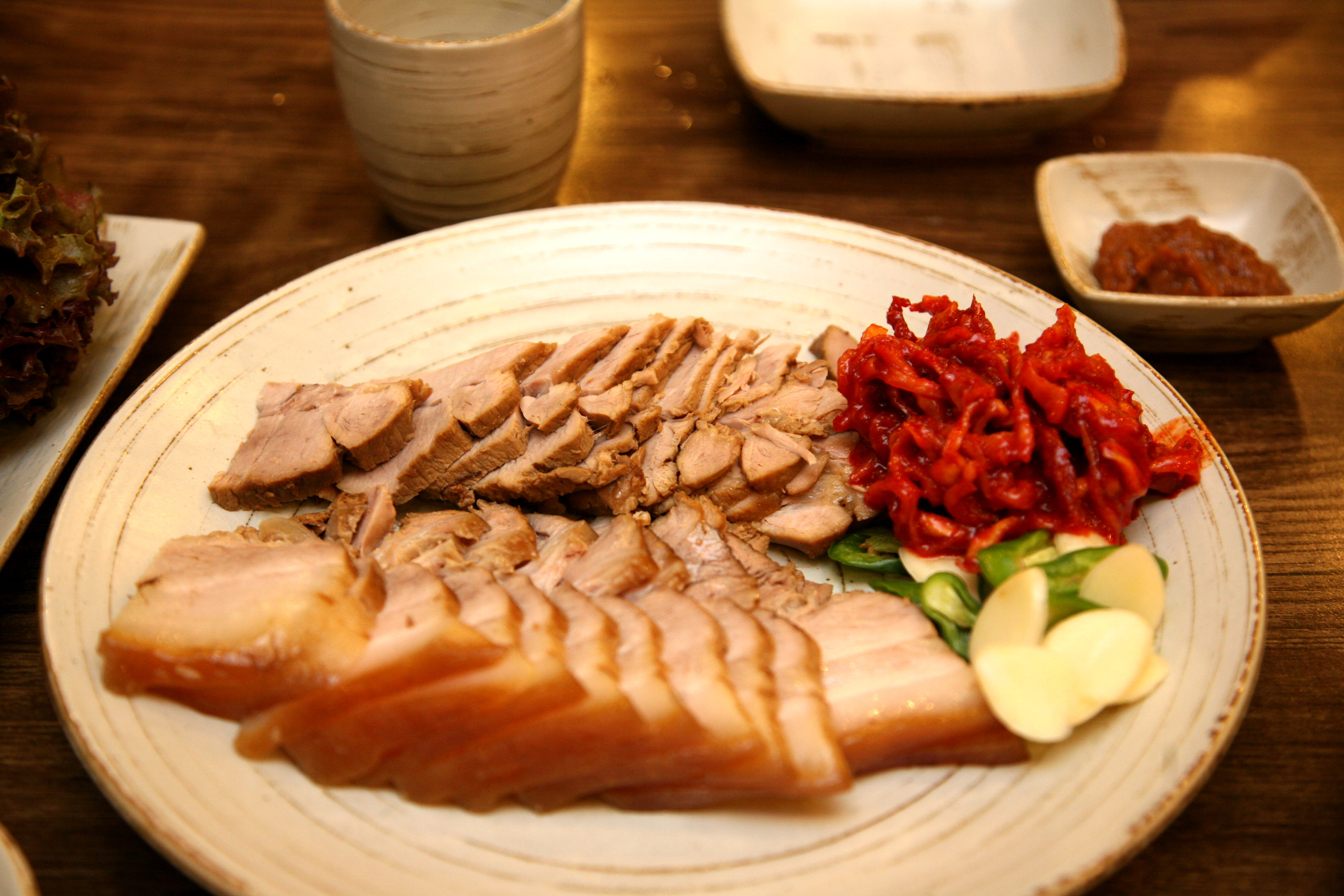

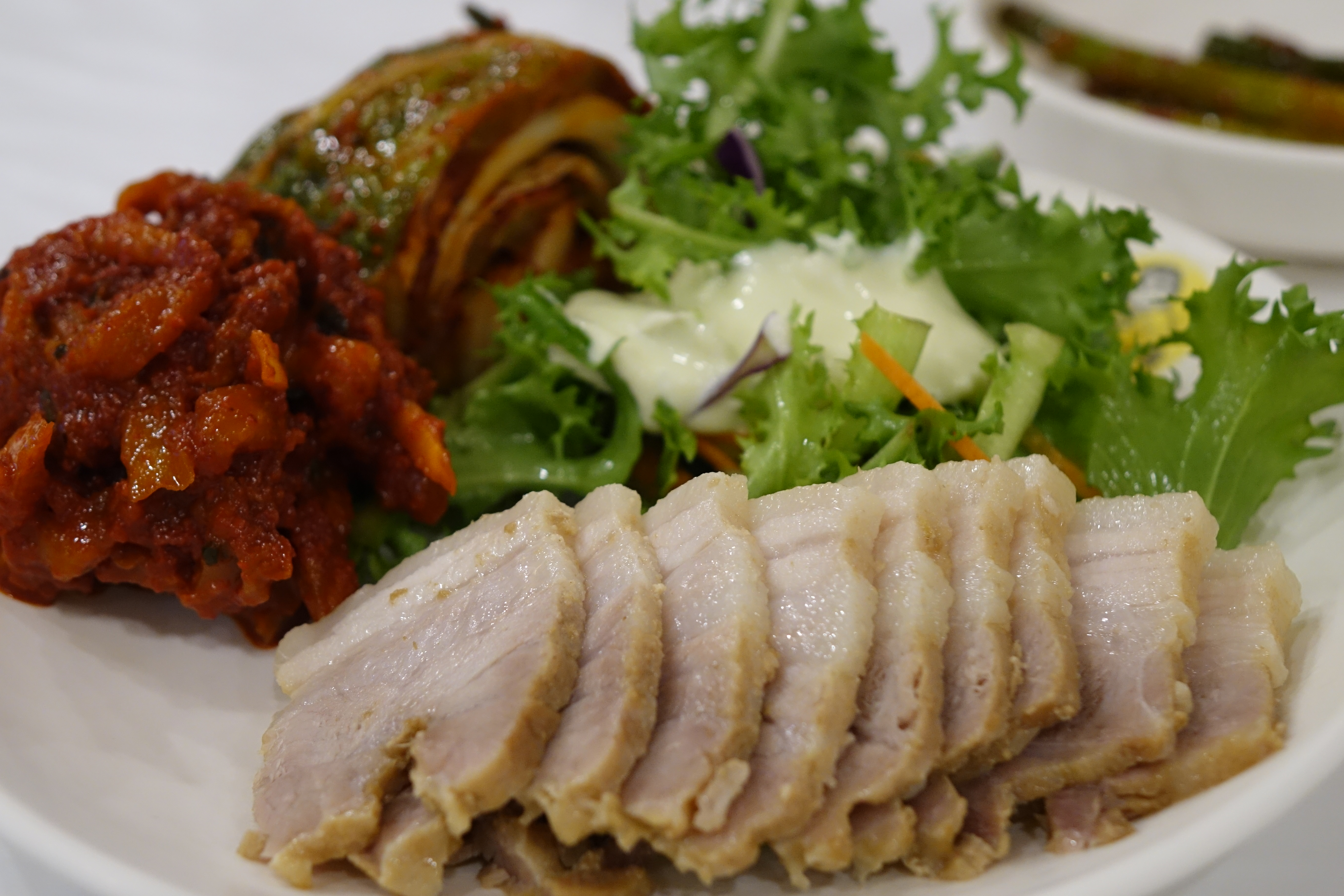

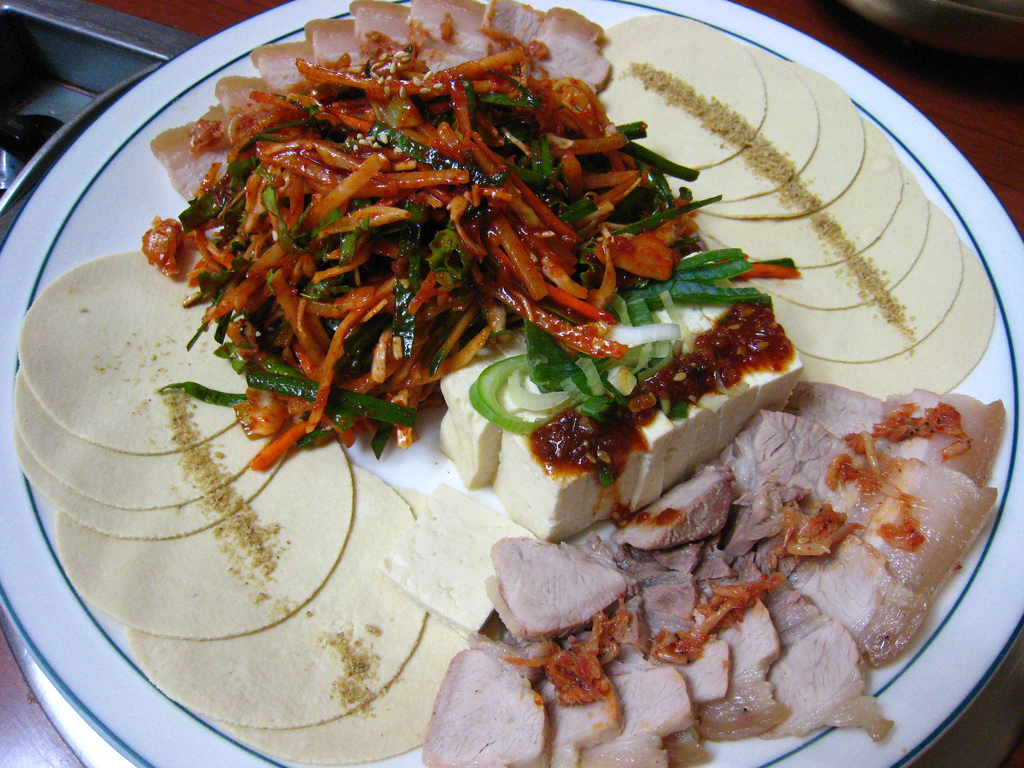

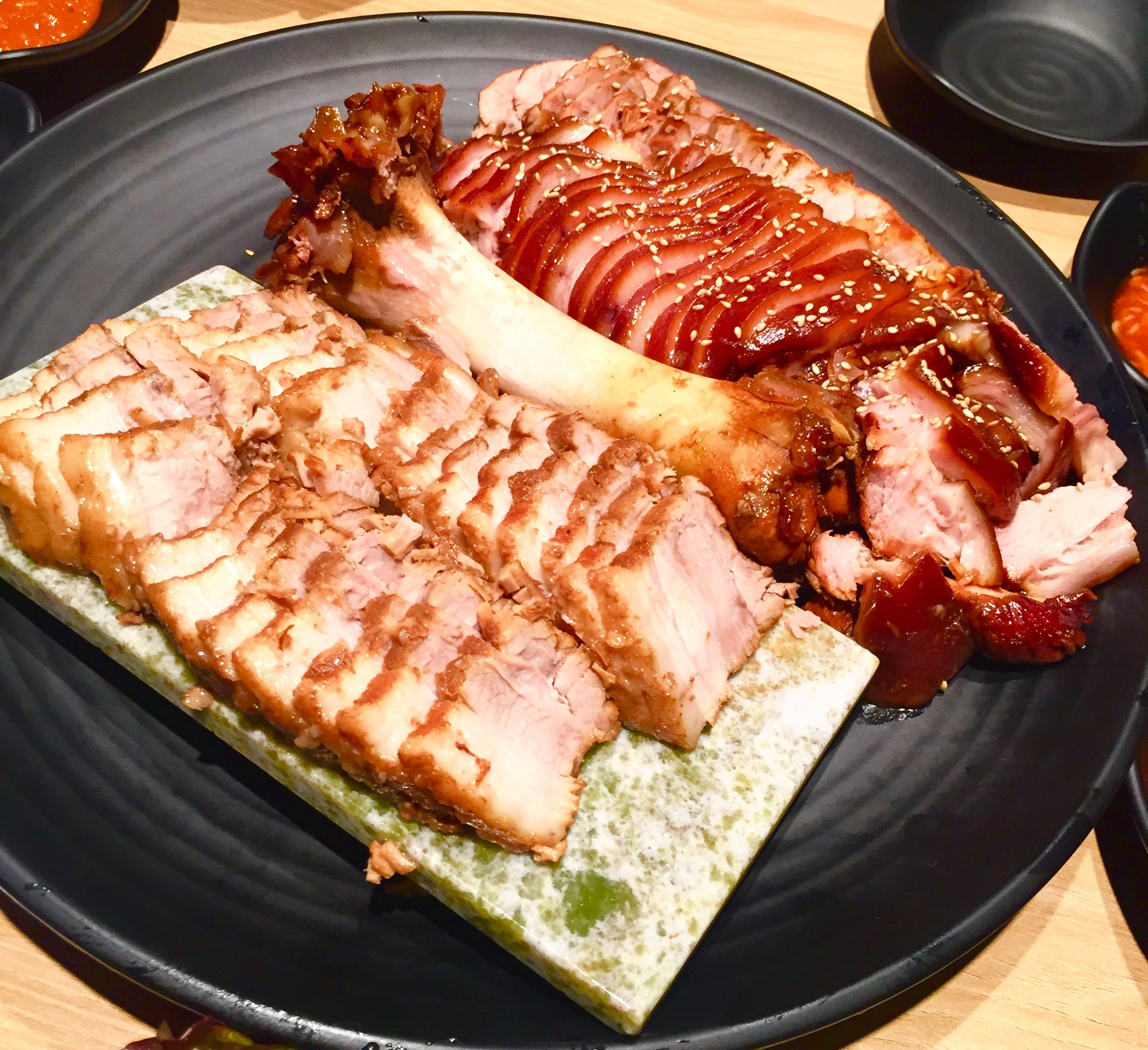
With jokbal

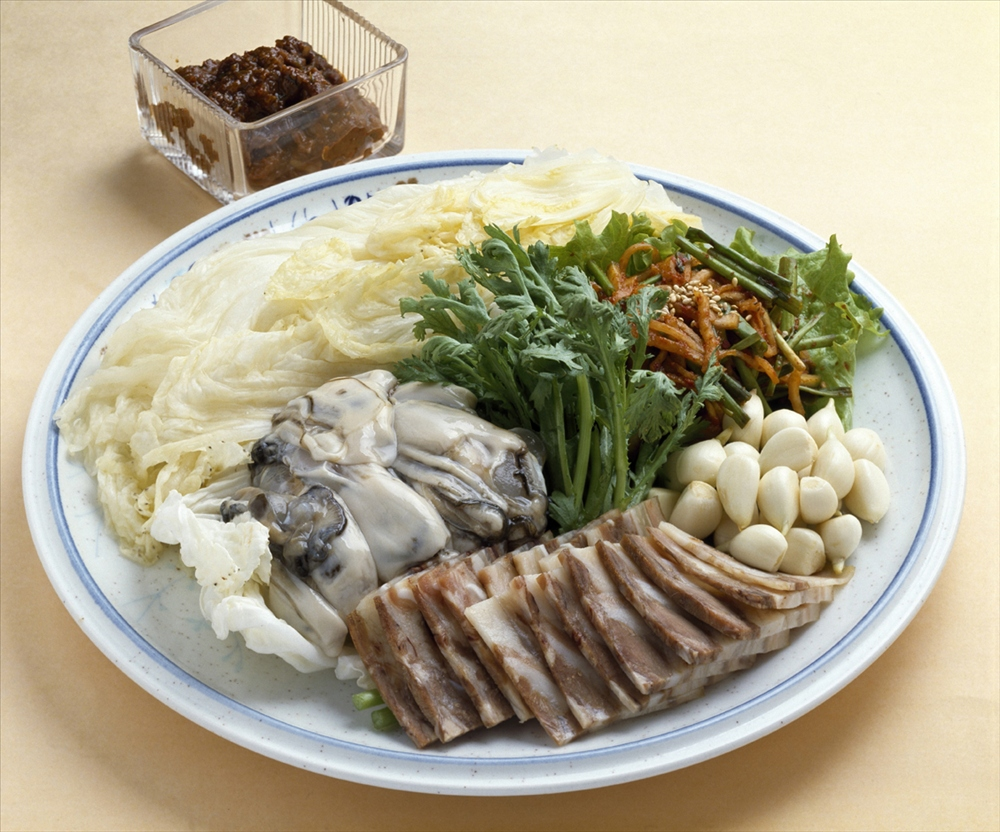
Gul-bossam (bossam with oysters)

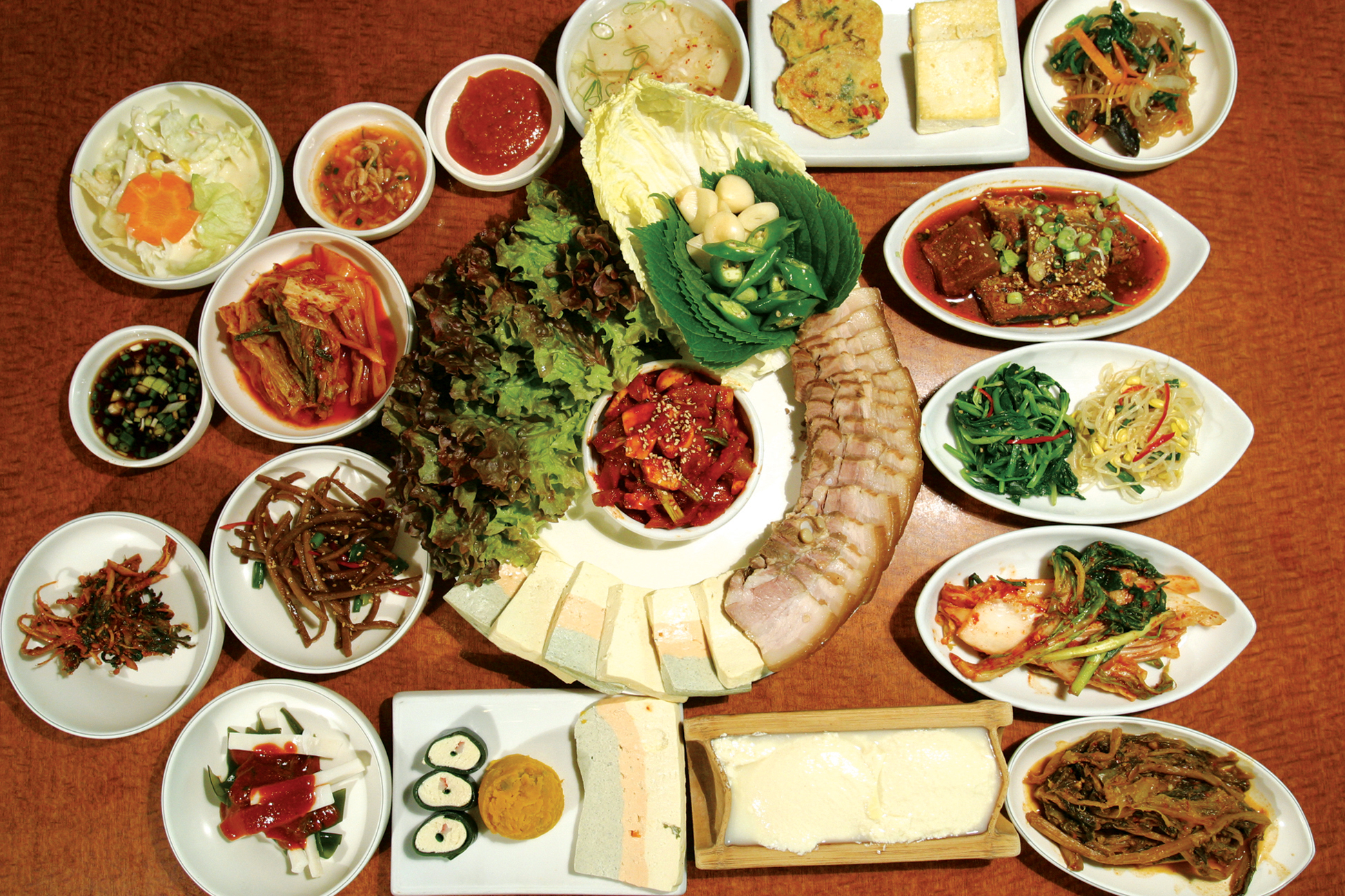
Bossam table with banchan (side dishes)

== See also ==
- Bún đậu mắm tôm
- Jokbal
- Ssam
