= Hoesik =

Type of gathering in Korea

Hoesik (Korean: 회식; Hanja: 會食; pronounced [hø̞ɕʰik̚]; lit. 'eating together') is a popular type of gathering in the society of South Korea, and refers to a group of people getting together to eat and drink. In Korean society, hoesik has been established as a subculture of an organization or enterprise. In Korean corporate culture, hoesik, which has been a longstanding tradition, typically takes place after work hours. However, such events have come under scrutiny as social issues due to the collectivist nature of Korean corporate culture, which has led to structural problems characterized by rigidity and coercion.

== History ==
The origin of hoesik was based on the word hoemin of the Joseon period. It is said that the word hoemin was used in order to make the kings and officials of Joseon become 'Let's be one'. It seems that the most likely theory has changed from the word hoemin to hoesik. In this way, hoesik is not a place for the individual, as it can be interpreted as an interpretation that the king and his subjects should live together and eat together.

Under the influence of Korean traditional military cultures, those lower than the superior must drink. Binge drinking was mainly encouraged by the 'bomb shot' or 'poktanju,' including beer+spirits and soju+spirits. In the 1990s, however, the campaign for sound drinking started, and the culture to avoid social gatherings spread due to the IMF economic crisis.

Companies and organizations are trying to improve their hoesik culture as a reaction to the prevailing social atmosphere surrounding the issues of 'bombshot', drinking glasses, and sexual harassment. Instead of focusing on just drinking and dancing, other forms of entertainment and cultural gatherings, such as watching movies and bowling are becoming increasingly common.

The Kim Young-ran Act (김영란법), also known as the anti-graft law, refers to the 2016 Improper Solicitation and Graft Act. After this law was enacted, various hoesik practices and after work entertainment culture have significantly decreased, while the percent of individual leisure activities has increased.

In 2017, the Me Too movement was widespread in Korea. And the Me Too movement is changing the hoesik inside Korean companies. The senior employees that were leading the hoesik had fewer hoesik as they left early. Some companies and public organizations are trying to reduce or eliminate events that their subordinates are uncomfortable with due to the Me Too movement. In other words, the hoesik that were forced on subordinates is decreasing.

== Function ==
Hoesik is a place where members of an organization can relax their tension and stress, increase their closeness to each other, resolve conflicts, enhance understanding among team members and help them become closer to each other. By reducing stress on members and eliminating inter-person and interdepartmental conflicts, it is possible to create harmony among members and increase efficiency of production.

One cannot get away from alcohol at a hoesik. Heavy drinking is a cause of embarrassment to people that are unable to drink well. This is because the boss or other office superiors are present and can witness one's drunken behavior. Because of the difficulty of refusing, people are forced to drink excessively. The next day's hangover can make them feel very tired and they can not go to work or spend the day in a bad mood.

Many company employees are forced to attend, although their attendance is often passive and uncomfortable. Attendance can also be implicitly forced, where employees who do not participate are often ostracized as being "inhumane" or "cold-blooded". Supervisors may lead the conversation while subordinates follow the conversation.

Most conversations at a hoesik may be with colleagues and supervisors and focus on company's shortcomings and company gossip. Negative talk and gossip can extend outside the hoesik, leading to a breakdown of relationships and the internal atmosphere.

== Foods ==
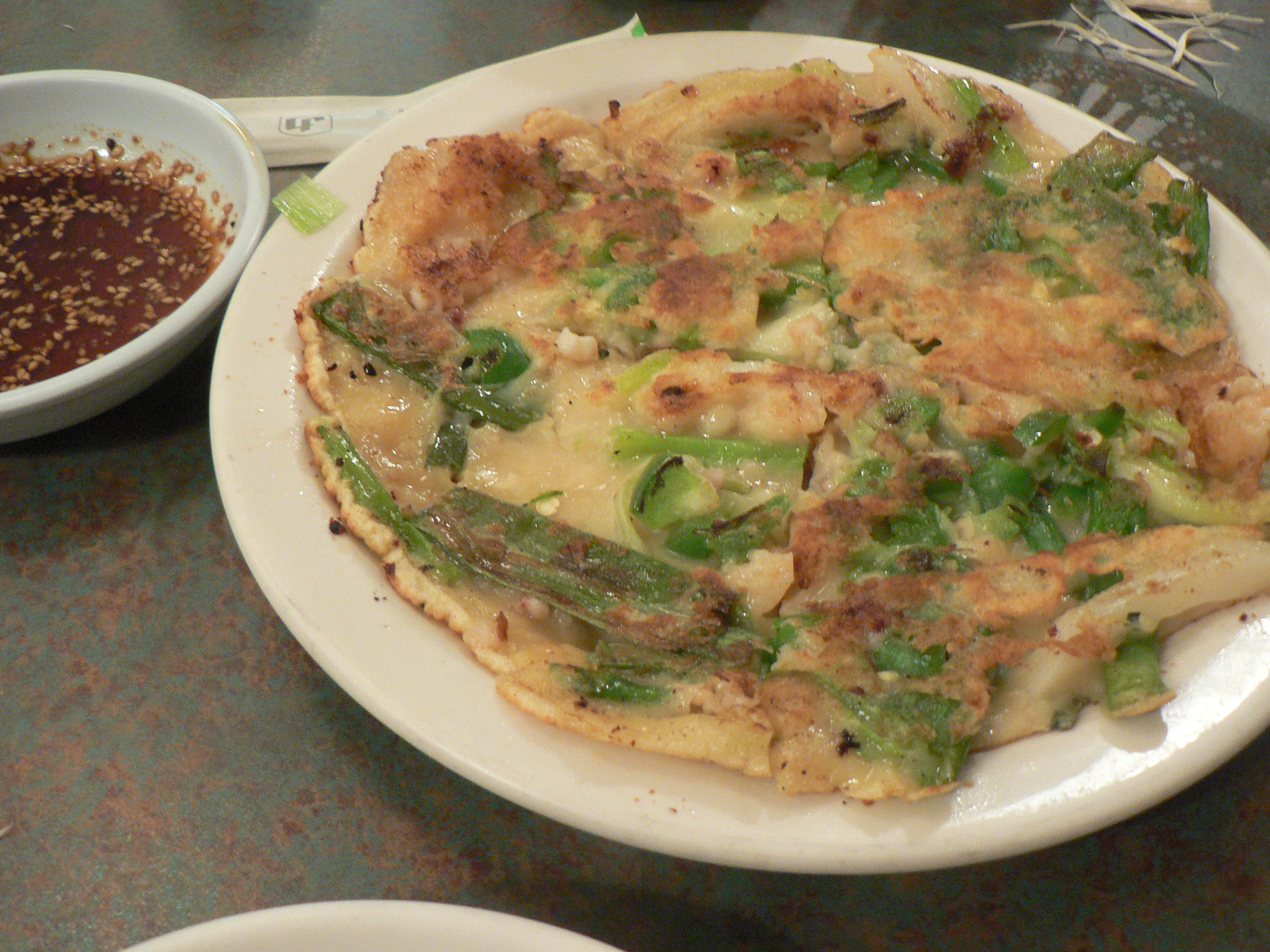
Korean food jeon

=== Rainy day ===
Koreans enjoy hoesik with Makgeolli (raw rice wine) and Jeon on a rainy day. There is a hypothesis that this is because the sound of the rain is similar to the sound of making the Jeon. And there is a hypothesis that on rainy days, your body's blood sugar level drops, helping to increase your blood sugar level. On rainy days, sales of flour and Makgeolli were also found to have risen sharply in large discount stores. A comparison of the rainy and sunny sales of Makgeolli and flour in Korean marts shows that sales of flour and MakgeollI rose 36.5 percent and 17.9 percent, respectively. This shows that Koreans eat a lot of Makgeolli and Jeon on rainy days.

=== Yellow dust day ===
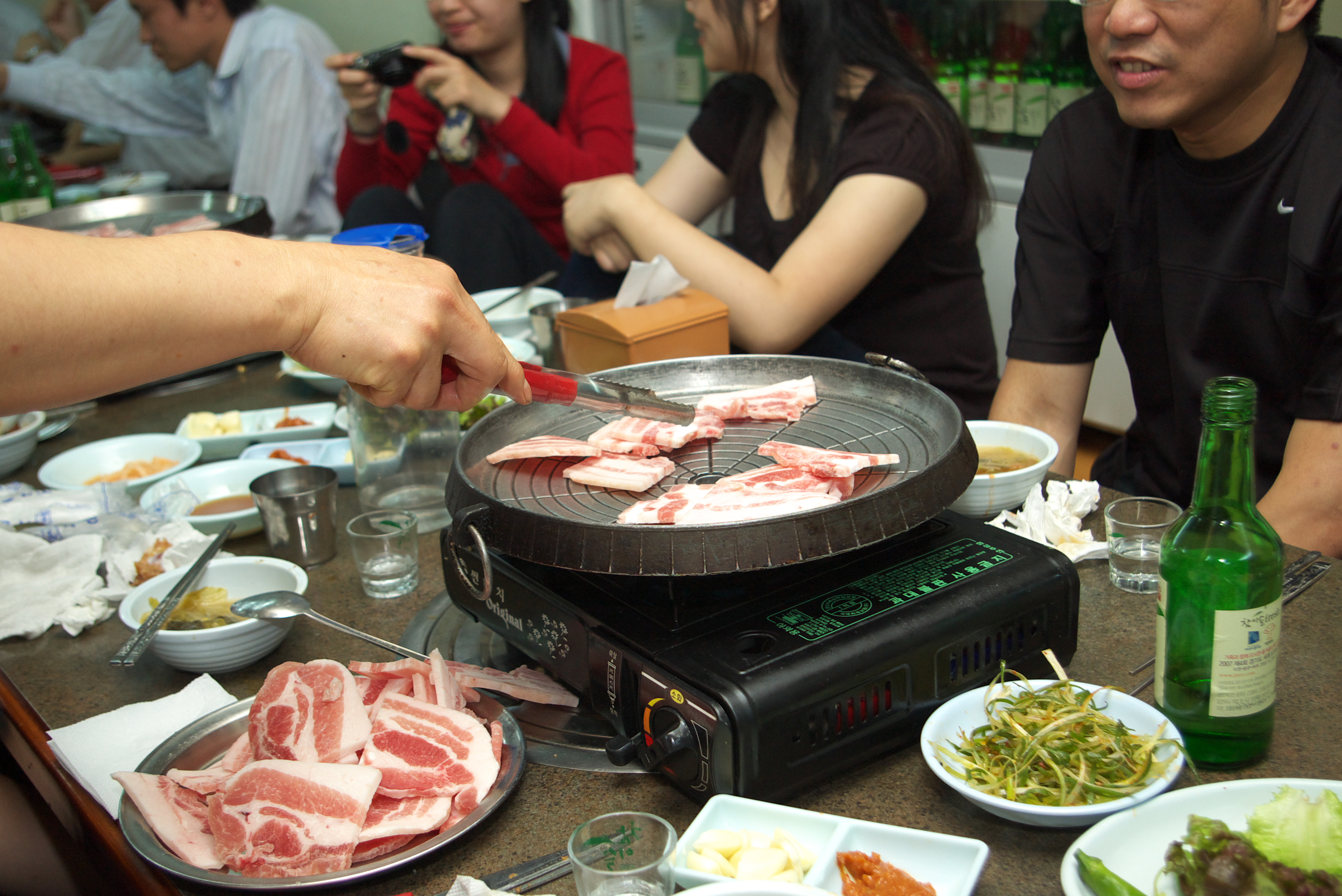
samgyeopsal and soju

Koreans eat a lot of samgyeopsal during "yellow dust" storms. It was a popular food among Korean miners, who ate it after work. This is because the miners have believed that after working in much dust, samgyeopsal washed the dust with their fat. And Koreans who enjoy hoesik usually drinks soju with samgyeopsal, because of its good taste and cheap price. For these reasons, eating with samgyeopsal and soju is popular on yellow dust days. However, there is no scientific evidence that samgyeopsal is good for yellow dust.

== Health ==
Drinking alcohol in hoesik can have health effects.

== See also ==
- Drinking culture of Korea
