= South Korean cuisine =

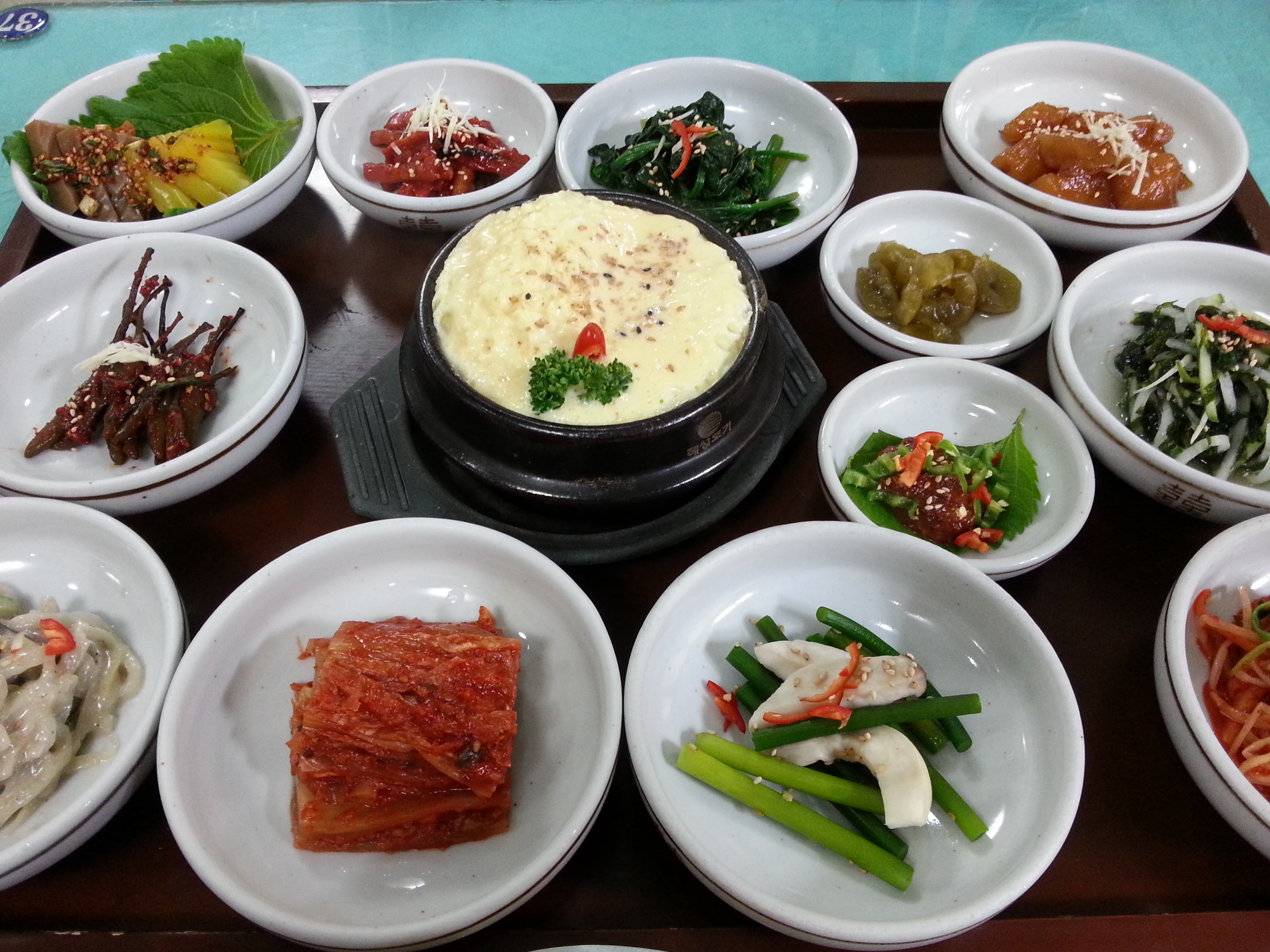
Various South Korean dishes and foods

South Korea is a country in East Asia constituting the southern part of the Korean Peninsula. It is bordered to the north by North Korea, and the two countries are separated by the Korean Demilitarized Zone. Some dishes are shared by the two Koreas.

Historically, Korean cuisine has evolved through centuries of social and political change. Originating from ancient agricultural and nomadic traditions in southern Manchuria and the Korean Peninsula, it has gone through a complex interaction of the natural environment and different cultural trends. Rice dishes and kimchi are staple Korean foods. In a traditional meal, they accompany both side dishes (banchan) and main courses like juk, bulgogi or noodles. Soju liquor is the best-known traditional Korean spirit.

== Beverages ==
=== Alcoholic beverages ===
Alcoholic beverages are consumed in South Korea, and drinking is a part of the culture of South Korea.

== Street food ==
Street food in South Korea has traditionally been seen as a part of popular culture in South Korea. Historically, street food mainly included foods such as eomuk, bungeo-ppang and tteok-bokki. Street food has been sold through many types of retail outlets, with new ones being developed over time. Recently, street food has seen a popular resurgence in South Korea, such as at the Night Market at Hangang Park, which is called "Bamdokkaebi Night Market".

== Delivery culture ==
Delivery culture in South Korea started in the Joseon era. It has since evolved into one of the most sophisticated and widely used services in the country, spanning from the 18th century to the present. Nowadays, because of a fast-paced lifestyle and the role of technology in everyday life, people use delivery services to deliver anything from food, documents, presents, etc. at a cheap price. Although delivery is quite common in other parts of the world, Korean delivery is unique in a way because of the use of scooters and motorcycles to quickly transport food and services.

== See also ==
- List of oldest restaurants in South Korea
