= Utto (disambiguation) =

Utto (died 829) was a German abbot.

Utto is a German given name. It may refer to:

- Utto of Freising (died 907), bishop of Freising
- Utto Rudolph, pseudonym of Yambo Ouologuem (born 1940), Malian writer and novelist

== See also ==
- Odo (disambiguation)
- Otto, given name
- Udo (disambiguation)
- Uto (disambiguation)
