= Udo =

Udo is a masculine given name.

Udo or UDO may also refer to:

== Places ==
- Udo (Jeju Province), an island in Jeju Province, South Korea
  - Udo-myeon, an administrative district corresponding to the island
- Udo (Incheon), an island in Incheon, South Korea
- Udo (Seosan), an island in South Chungcheong Province, South Korea

== Plants ==
- Udo, one of the common names for Aralia cordata, an Asian plant eaten as a vegetable

== Culture ==
- U.D.O., heavy metal band formed in 1987
- United Dance Organisation (UDO), world's largest street dance organisation
- Udo-jingū, a Shinto shrine in Nichinan, Miyazaki prefecture, Japan
- Udo the Red Panda, mascot of the University of Mannheim
- Tommy Udo, a character in the 1947 film Kiss of Death

== Sports ==
- União Desportiva Oliveirense (UDO), commonly known as UD Oliveirense or simply Oliveirense, a Portuguese sports club

== Other uses ==
- Udo (given name), a given name
- UDO (markup language), a lightweight markup language
- Ultra Density Optical (UDO), an optical disk format for data storage
- Unified Development Ordinance (UDO), a local policy instrument combining zoning and other regulations

== See also ==
- Udoh, a surname
- Odo, a name
- Uto (disambiguation)
