= Sanjeok =

Korean skewer dish

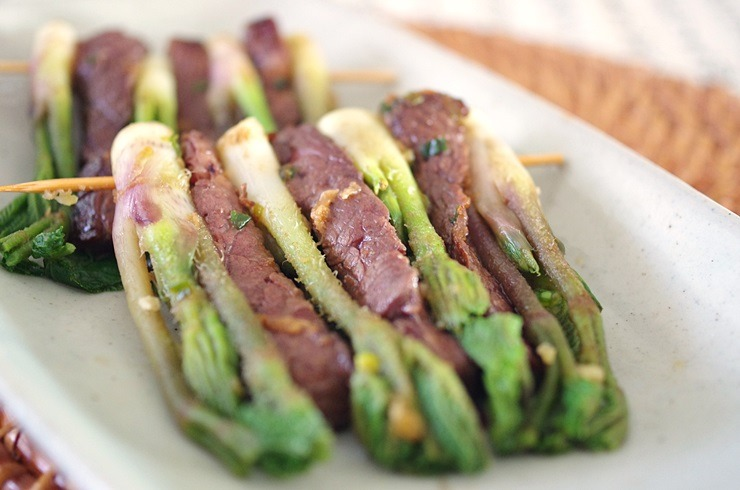
- Ttangdureup-sanjeok (spikenard and beef skewers)
- Type: Jeok
- Place of origin: Korea
- Associated cuisine: Korean cuisine

Korean name
- Hangul: 산적
- Hanja: 散炙
- RR: sanjeok
- MR: sanjŏk
- IPA: [san.dʑʌk̚]

Sanjeok (Korean: 산적; Hanja: 散炙) is a type of jeok (skewered food) in Korean cuisine. It is usually made by placing seasoned slices of beef with vegetables on a skewer and grilling them. All the ingredients are sliced into 5–6 cm (2.0–2.4 in) long pieces. Unlike other jeok dishes, sanjeok is not dredged with flour or egg-washed before being grilled. Sanjeok may be used in jesa (ancestral rites) or eaten as banchan (a side dish).

Teok-sanjeok is grilled with beef and white rice cake seasoned with seasoning.

== Varieties ==
Sanjeok ingredients may vary, with beef as a staple.

- Dureup-sanjeok (angelica-tree shoot skewers)
- Eo-sanjeok (fish skewers) – often made with brown croaker
- Gogi-sanjeok (beef skewers)
- Honghap-sanjeok (mussel skewers)
- Ojingeo-sanjeok (squid skewers)
- Pa-sanjeok (scallion skewers)
- Songi-sanjeok (pine mushroom skewers)
- Sora-sanjeok (conch skewers)
- Tteok-sanjeok (rice cake skewers)

Jang-sanjeok and seop-sanjeok are not skewered dishes.

- Jang-sanjeok – made by grilling beef patties and simmering them in soy sauce
- Seop-sanjeok – made by grilling patties made with beef and tofu

== Gallery ==
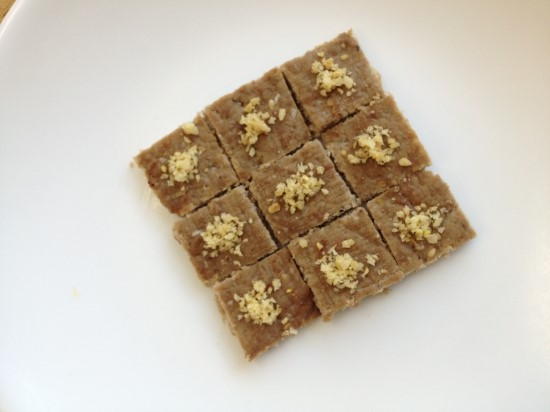
Seop-sanjeok (beef patty skewers)

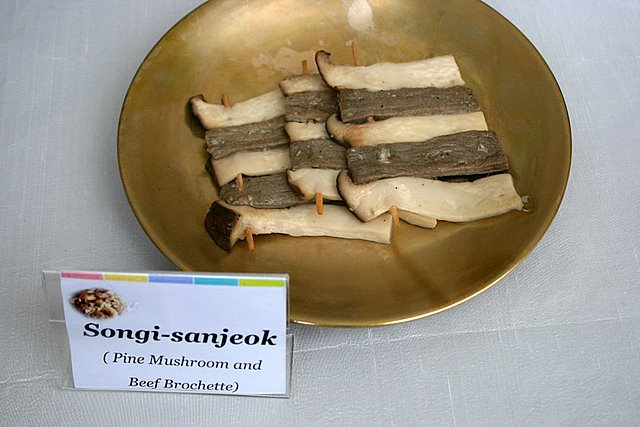
Songi-sanjeok (pine mushroom skewers)

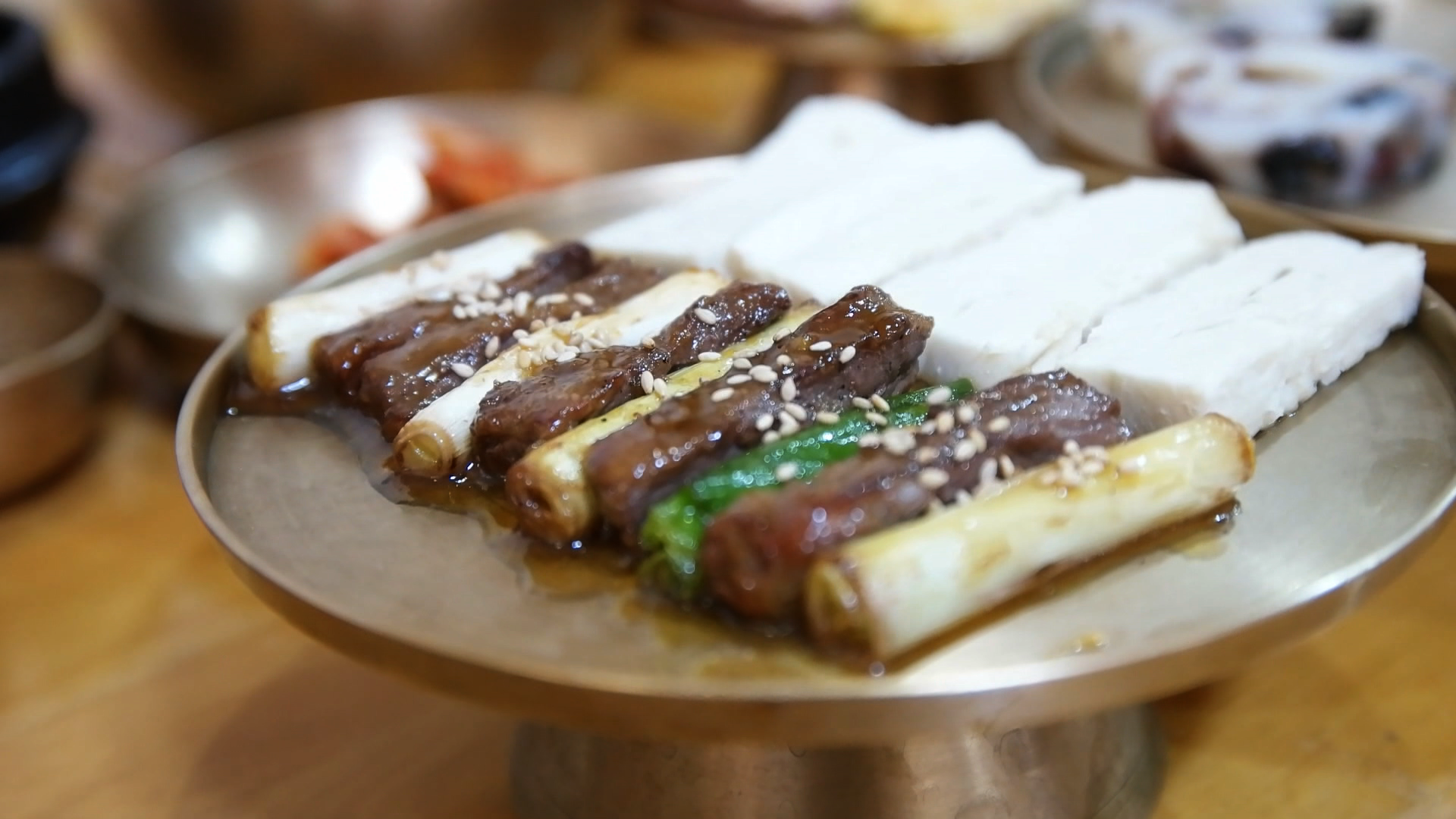
Pa-sanjeok (scallion and beef skewers)

== See also ==
- Gui
- Jeon
