= Kinpira =

Japanese cooking style

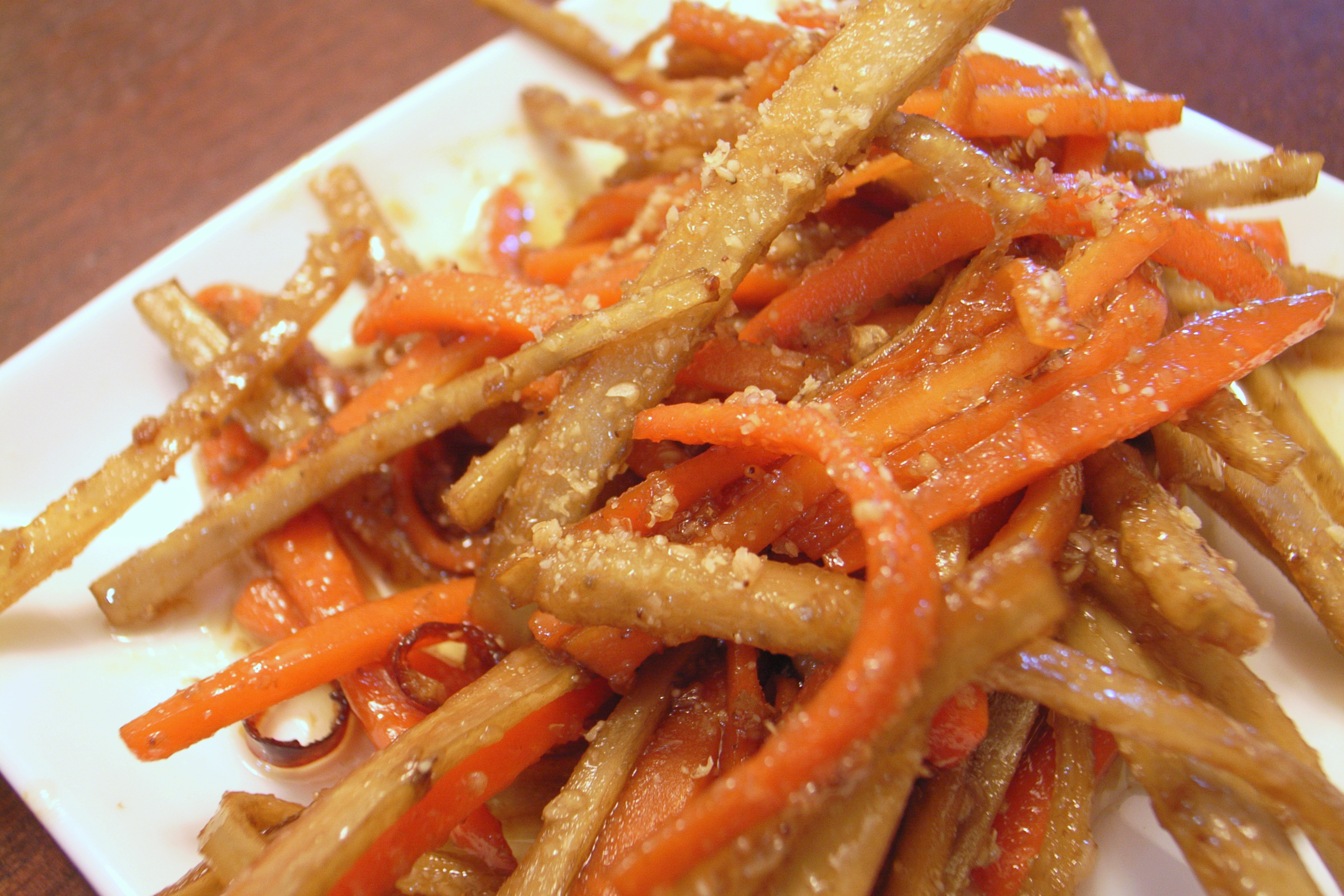
- Kinpira
- Course: Side dish
- Place of origin: Japan
- Main ingredients: Burdock, carrot, lotus root, celery, kabocha, udo, soy sauce, mirin

Kinpira (金平) is a Japanese side dish, usually made of root vegetables that have been sautéed and simmered. The most common variety is kinpira gobō, or braised burdock root. Other vegetables used include carrots, lotus root; skins of squash such as kabocha, mushrooms, broccoli, or wild itadori (Japanese knotweed) stems; and seaweeds such as arame and hijiki. Foods such as tofu, capsicums, wheat gluten (namafu), chicken thigh, pork, and beef may be added.

The simmering sauce is made up of soy sauce, mirin, sugar, and chili peppers.

== Name ==
Kinpira is named after the son of Kintarō, a Japanese folk hero.

== Gallery ==
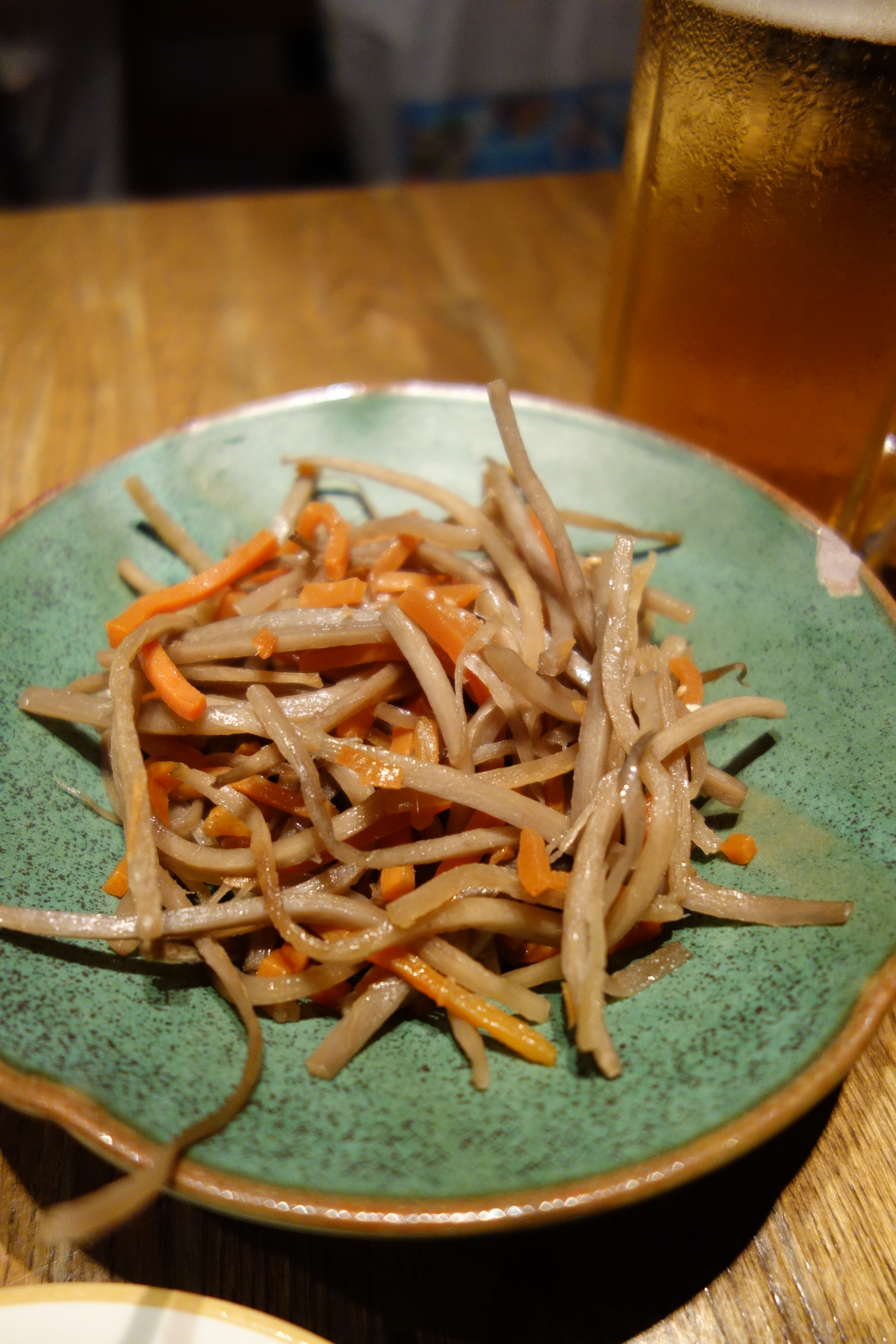
Kinpira gobō (burdock root)

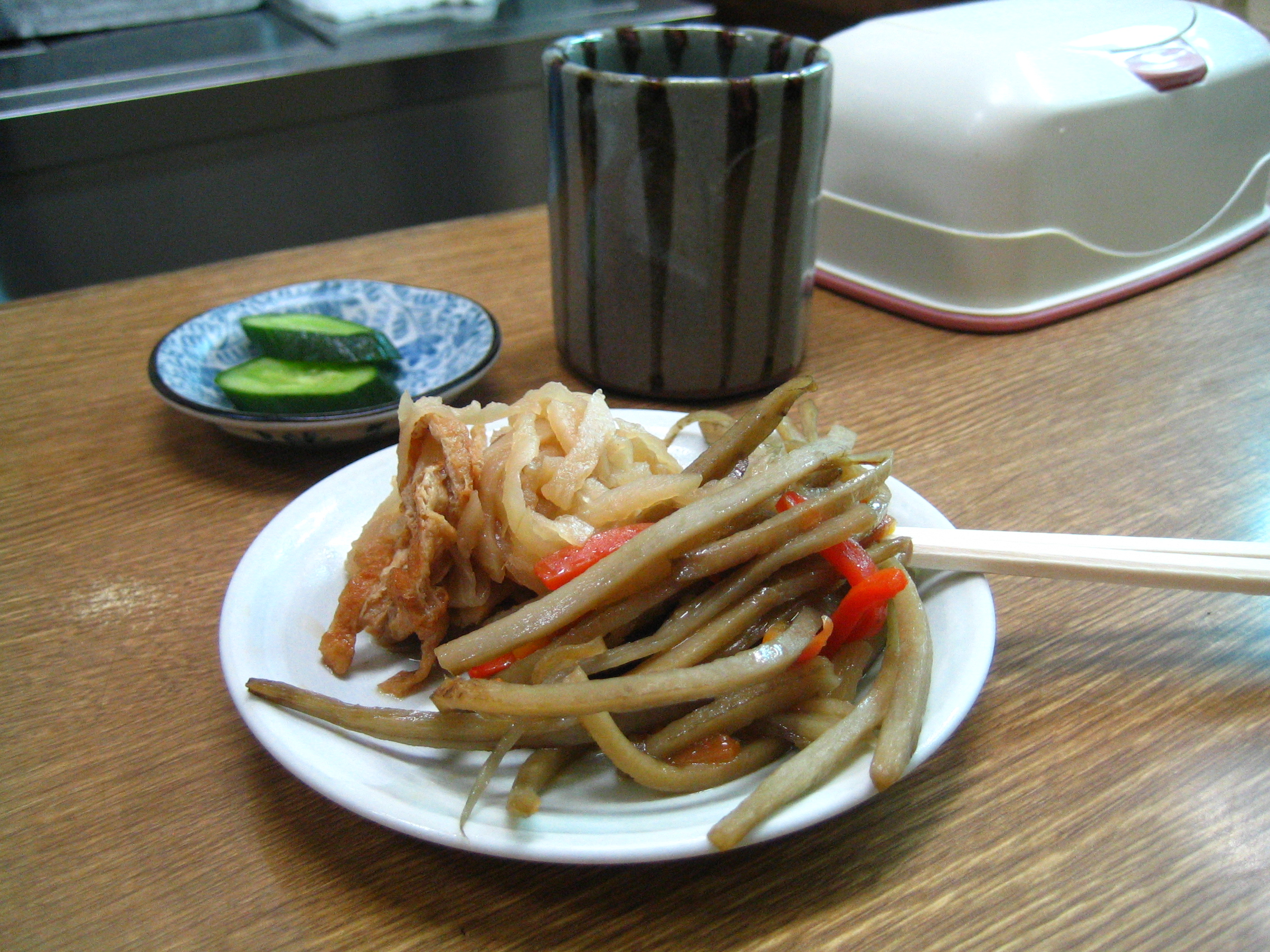
Burdock root

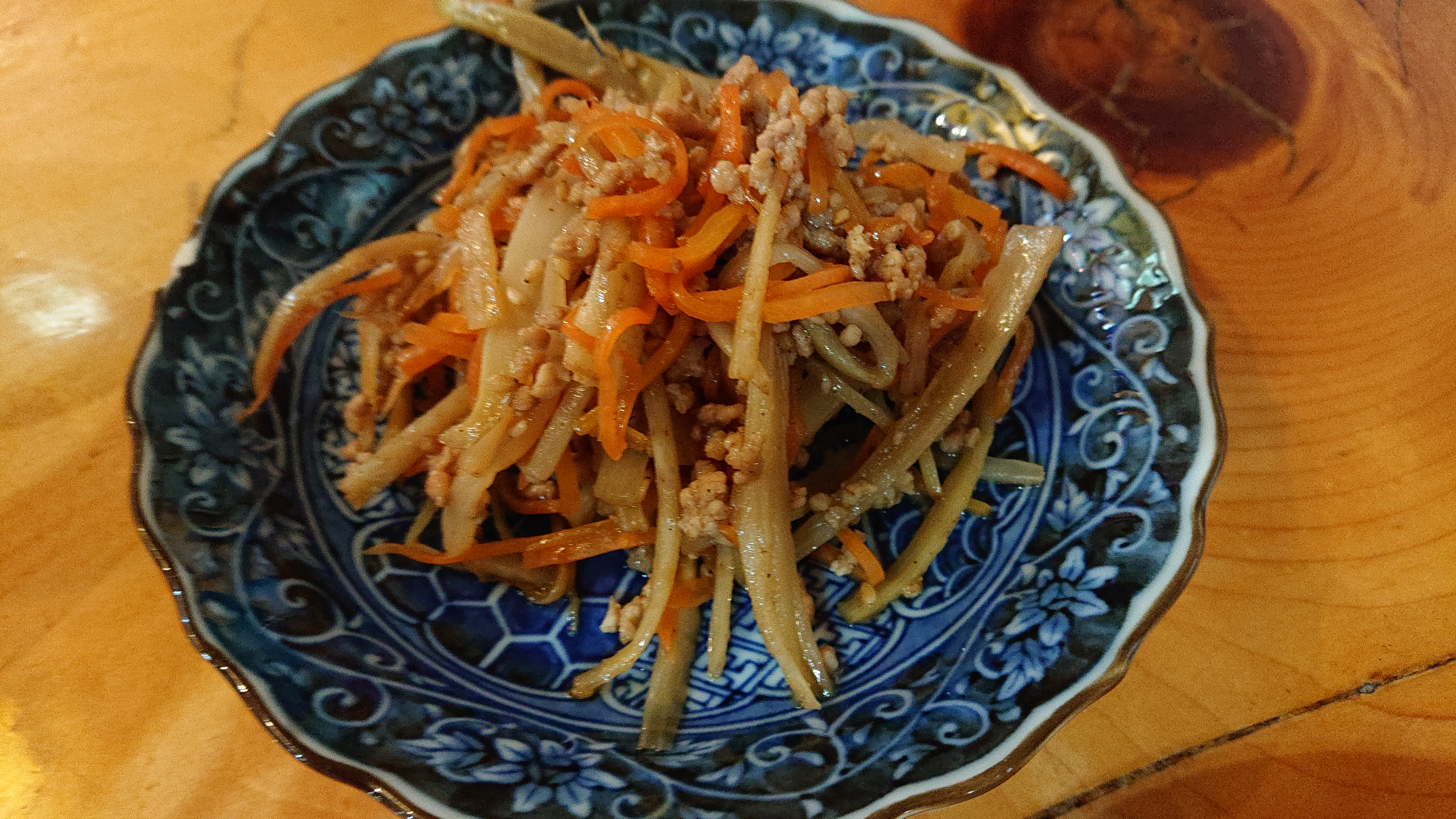
Udo and carrots

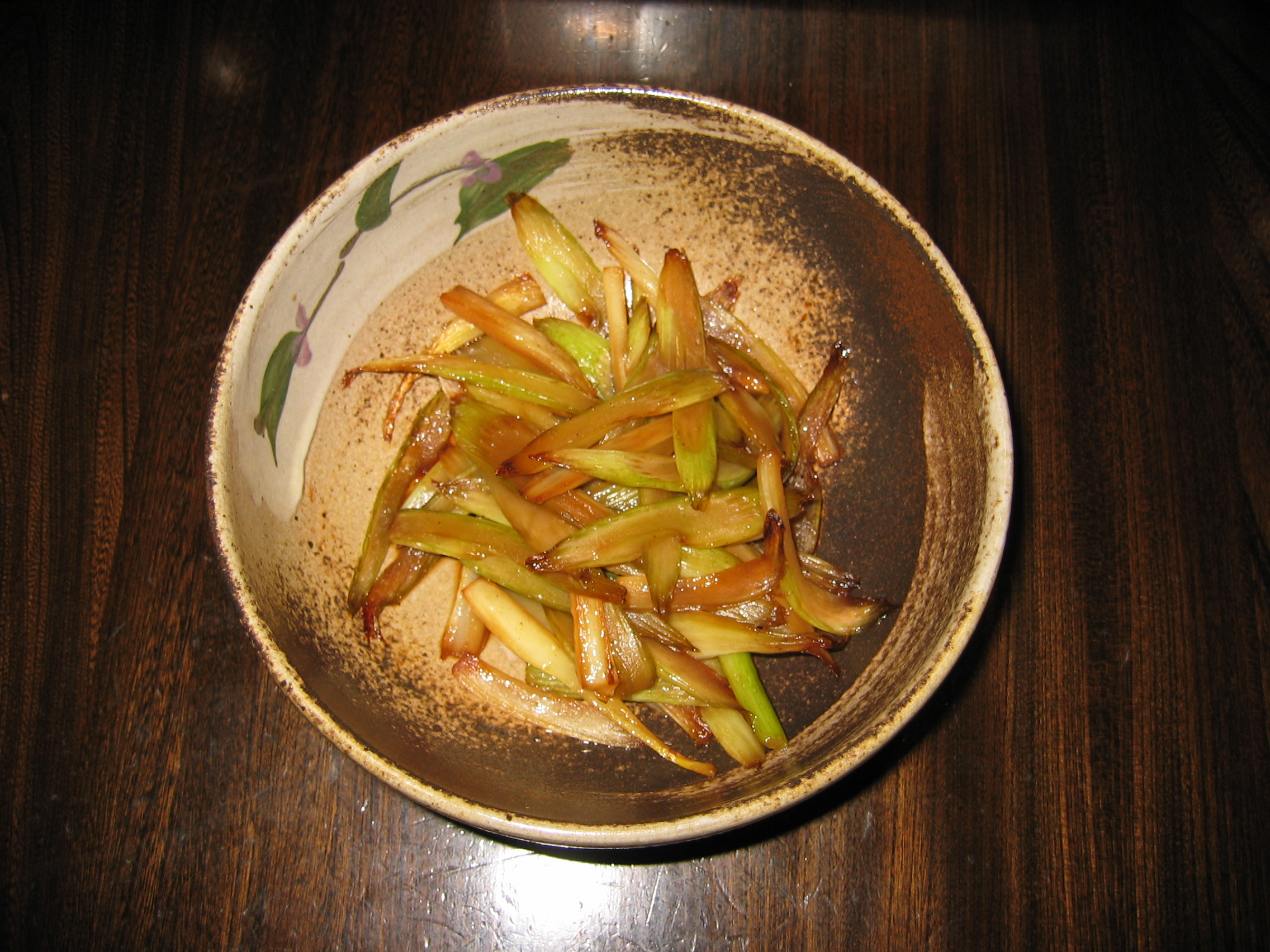
Celery
