= Gamelbert of Michaelsbuch =

8th century Bavarian Christian priest

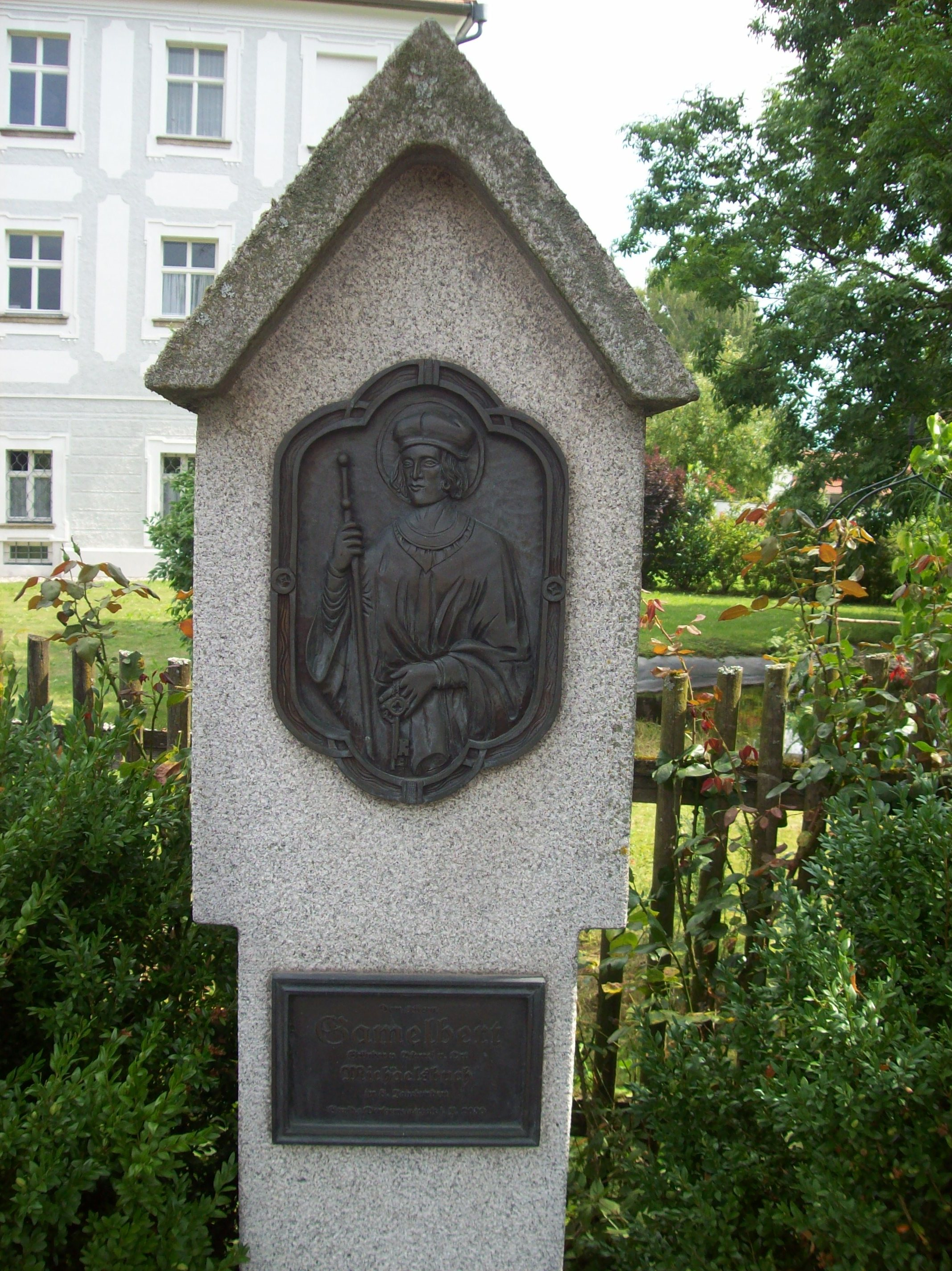

The Blessed Gamelbert was a Christian priest, who worked in the 8th century in what is now Stephansposching, Bavaria, Germany. He is commemorated on January 17.

== Life ==
Gamelbert of Michaelsbuch was born in 720 in Michaelsbuch in Bavaria. He was the son of wealthy aristocrats, who planned for him a career in the military. However, he preferred to herd his father's flocks, because in the peaceful stillness of the fields and forests he could turn his mind to prayer and meditation. A local priest began to teach him, and he was ordained a priest.

Once he made a pilgrimage to Rome. On the return journey he found hospitality in a house where a mother had just given birth. She asked Gamelbert to christen her newborn son. The child's name was Utto. After the death of his parents, he used his inheritance to establish a parish on property he owned in Michaelsbuch. He worked there for over 50 years as a parish priest in Michaelsbuch. Gentle by nature, he was unfailingly generous to the poor.

Gamelbert acquired from Duke Tassilo III a piece of woodland on the opposite bank of the Danube between Mariaposching and Deggendorf, for which he had to pay a tax known as the Medema. From this was derived the name of Metten both for the place itself and for the monastery he founded there.

In 766 he cleared the land and founded the Benedictine Metten Abbey in Lower Bavaria, not far from Michaelsbuch. Gamelbert had prepared his godson Utto for the priesthood. He brought, Utto, now a monk at Reichenau, to be its first abbot. (Other sources say that Utto himself founded the monastery in 766 on a piece of land he owned.)

== Veneration ==
Gamelbert died on 17 January around 802. Many pilgrims and needy people made pilgrimages to his tomb. His vita was written circa 1000 by a monk from Saint Emmeram's Abbey. Gamelbert was depicted in 1414 on the cover of a Bible in Metten Abbey.

He was beatified by the confirmation of his cult on 25 August 1909 by Pope Pius X. His memorial day is January 17. At the same time, the cult of blessed Utto of Metten was confirmed. In art he is depicted as a priest in an oratory surrounded by sheep.

In 2017 five graves of Christians from about the 8th to 12th century were discovered during an archaeological dig at a construction site in Michaelsbuch. Also found were post pits suggesting the site of an early church. The five skeletons have been referred for further study.
