= Udoh =

Udoh is a surname. Notable people with this name include:

- Daniel Udoh, Nigerian footballer
- Ekpe Udoh, American basketball player
- Kingsley Udoh, Nigerian footballer
- Mercy Akide Udoh, Nigerian footballer
- Nnamdi Udoh, Nigerian airspace manager
- Oli Udoh (born 1997), American football player
- Saviour Friday Udoh, Nigerian politician
- Victor Udoh (2004–2026), Nigerian footballer
