= Kabocha =

Type of winter squash

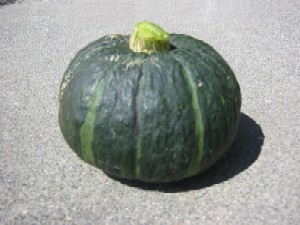
A whole kabocha squash

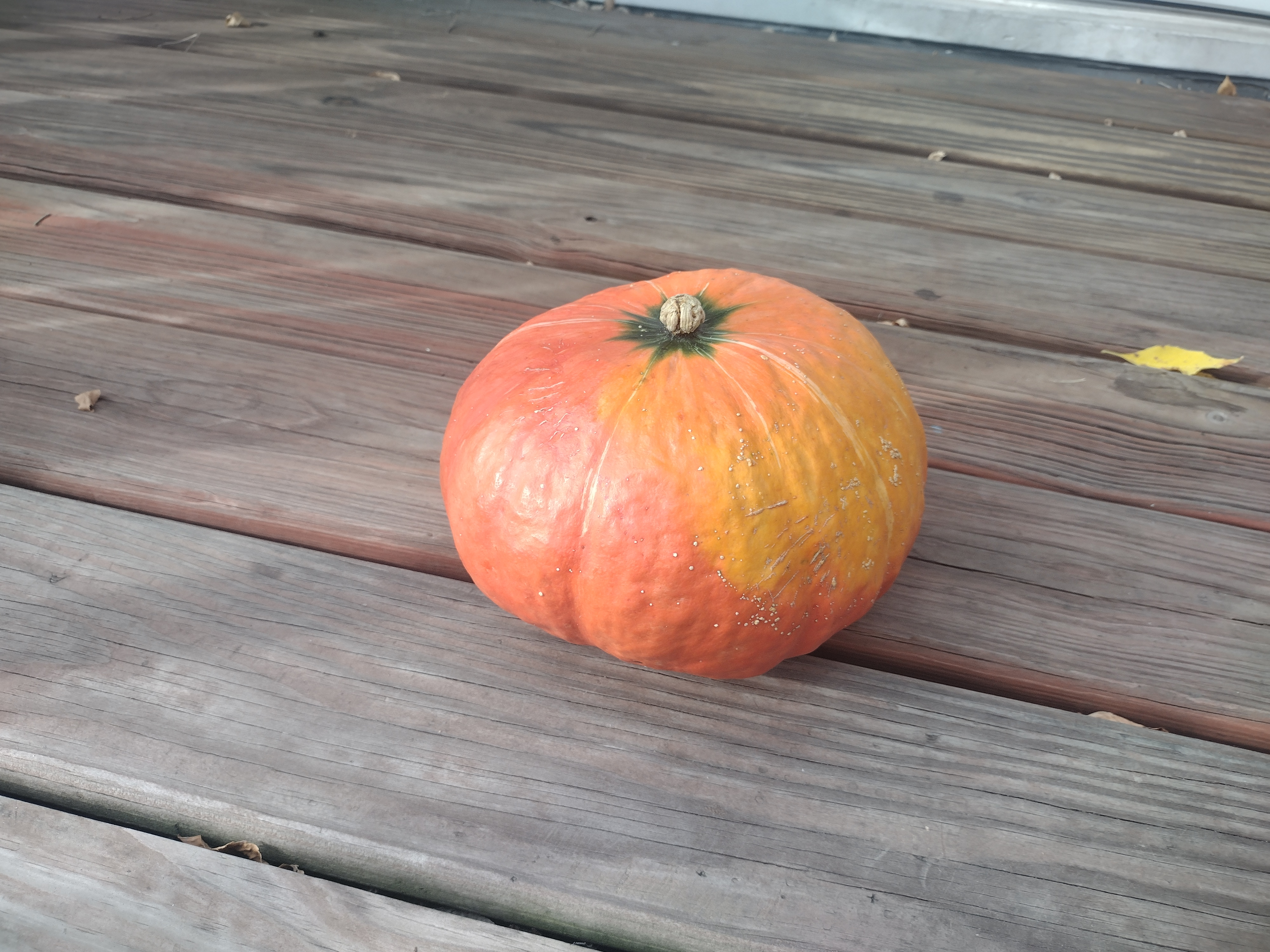
A hybrid "Sunshine" kabocha

Kabocha (/kəˈboʊtʃə/; from Japanese カボチャ, 南瓜) is a type of winter squash, a Japanese variety of the species Cucurbita maxima. It is also called kabocha squash or Japanese pumpkin in North America. In Japan, kabocha may refer to either this squash, to the Western pumpkin, or indeed to other squashes. In Australia, "Japanese pumpkin" is a synonym of Kent pumpkin, a variety of winter squash (C. moschata).

Many of the kabocha in the market are kuri kabocha, a type created from seiyo kabocha (buttercup squash). Varieties of kabocha include Ajihei, Ajihei No. 107, Ajihei No. 331, Ajihei No. 335, Ebisu, Emiguri, Marron d'Or and Miyako.

== Description ==
Kabocha is hard on the outside with knobbly-looking skin that is often dark green, red-orange, or gray. It is shaped like a squat pumpkin and has an intense yellow-orange color on the inside. In many respects it is similar to buttercup squash, but without the characteristic protruding "cup" on the bottom. An average kabocha weighs two to three pounds (1–1.5 kg), but a large squash can weigh as much as eight pounds (3.5 kg).

== Culinary use ==
Kabocha has an exceptionally sweet flavor, even sweeter than butternut squash. It is similar in texture and flavor to a pumpkin and sweet potato combined. Some kabocha can taste like russet potatoes or chestnuts. The rind is edible, although some cooks may peel it to speed up the cooking process or to suit their personal taste preferences. Kabocha is commonly used in side dishes and soups, or as a substitute for potato or other squash varieties. It can be roasted after cutting the squash in half, scooping out the seeds, and then cutting the squash into wedges. With a little cooking oil and seasoning, it can be baked in the oven. Likewise, cut kabocha halves can be added to a pressure cooker and steamed under high pressure for 15–20 minutes. One can slowly bake kabocha whole and uncut in a convection oven, after which the entire squash becomes soft and edible, including the rind.

Kabocha is available all year but is best in late summer and early fall. Kabocha is primarily grown in Japan, South Korea, Thailand, California, Florida, Hawaii, Southwestern Colorado, Mexico, Tasmania, Tonga, New Zealand, Chile, Jamaica, and South Africa, but is widely adapted for climates that provide a growing season of 100 days or more. Most of the kabocha grown in California, Colorado, Tonga and New Zealand is actually exported to Japan.

=== Japan ===
In Japan, kabocha is a common ingredient in vegetable tempura and is also made into soup and croquettes. Less traditional but popular uses include incorporation in desserts such as pies, pudding, and ice cream.

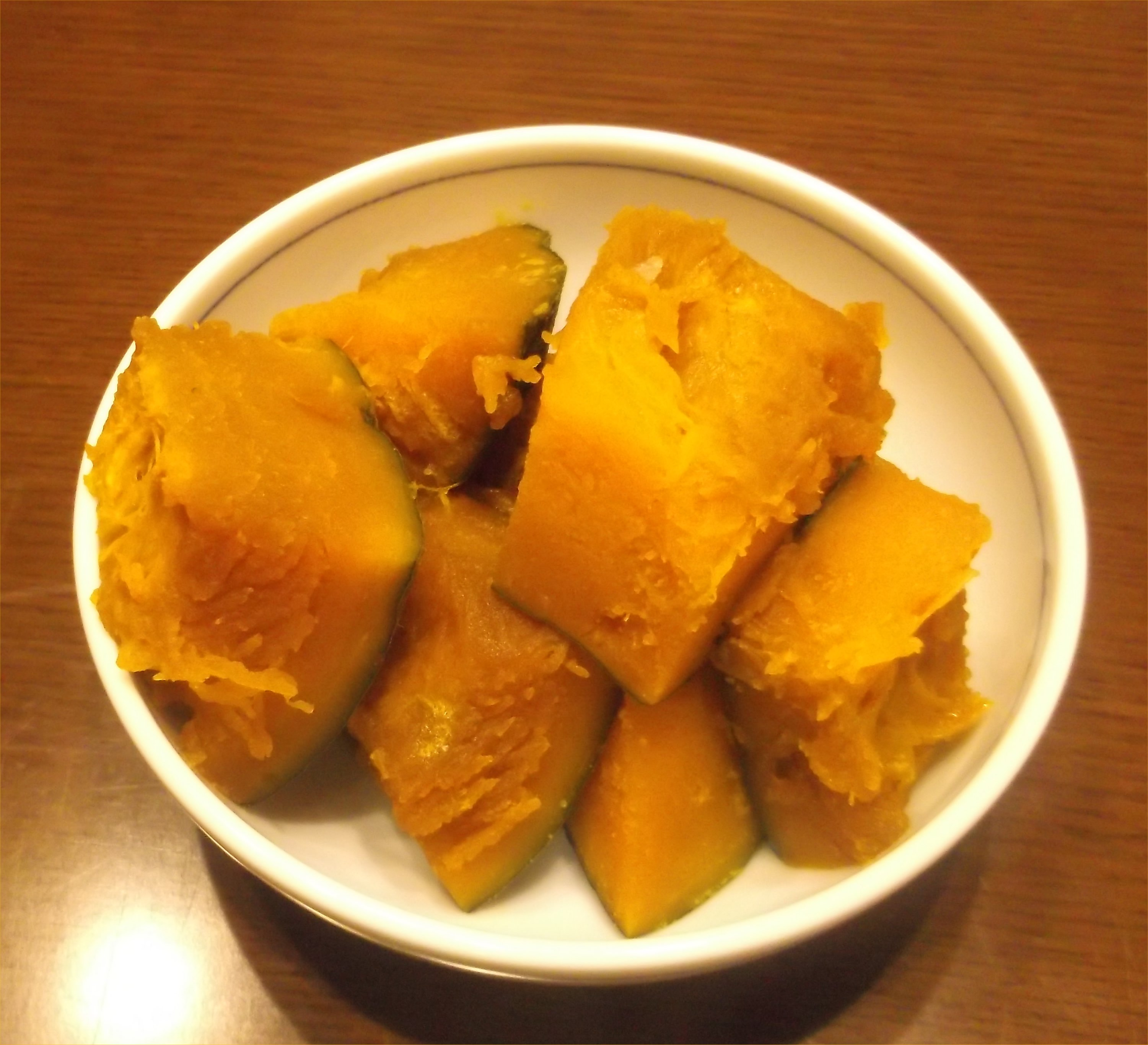
Nimono of kabocha, part of Japanese cuisine

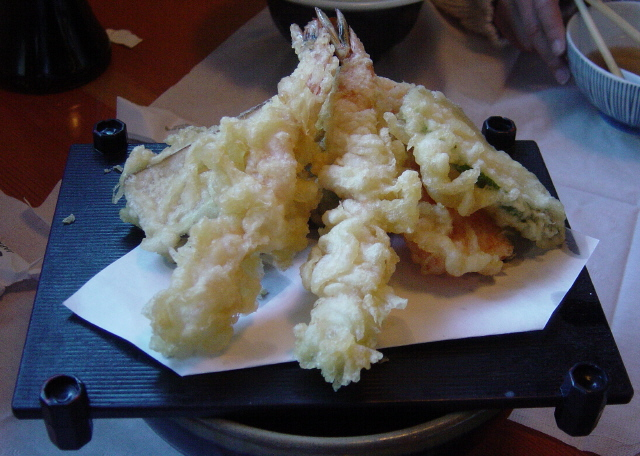
Shown on the right, kabocha is a common ingredient in tempura

=== Korea ===
In Korea, danhobak (단호박) is commonly used for making hobak-juk (pumpkin porridge). Danhobak literally means 'sweet pumpkin'.

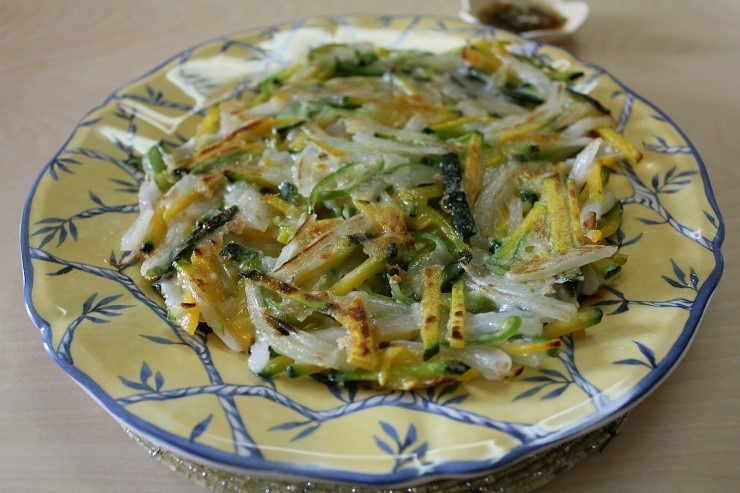
Danhobak-buchimgae (kabocha pancake)

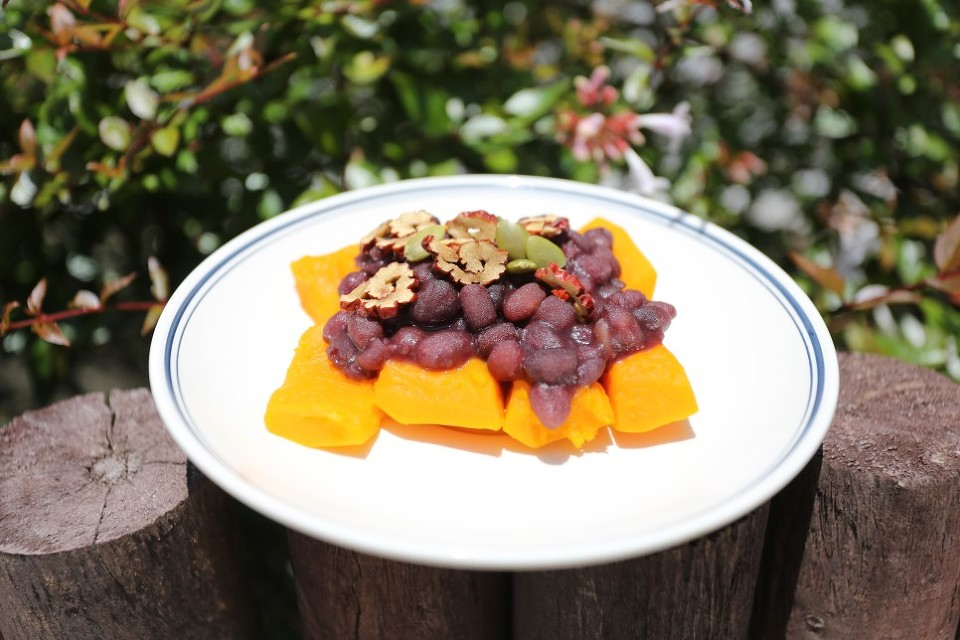
Danhobak-jjim (steamed kabocha) topped with red beans and jujube

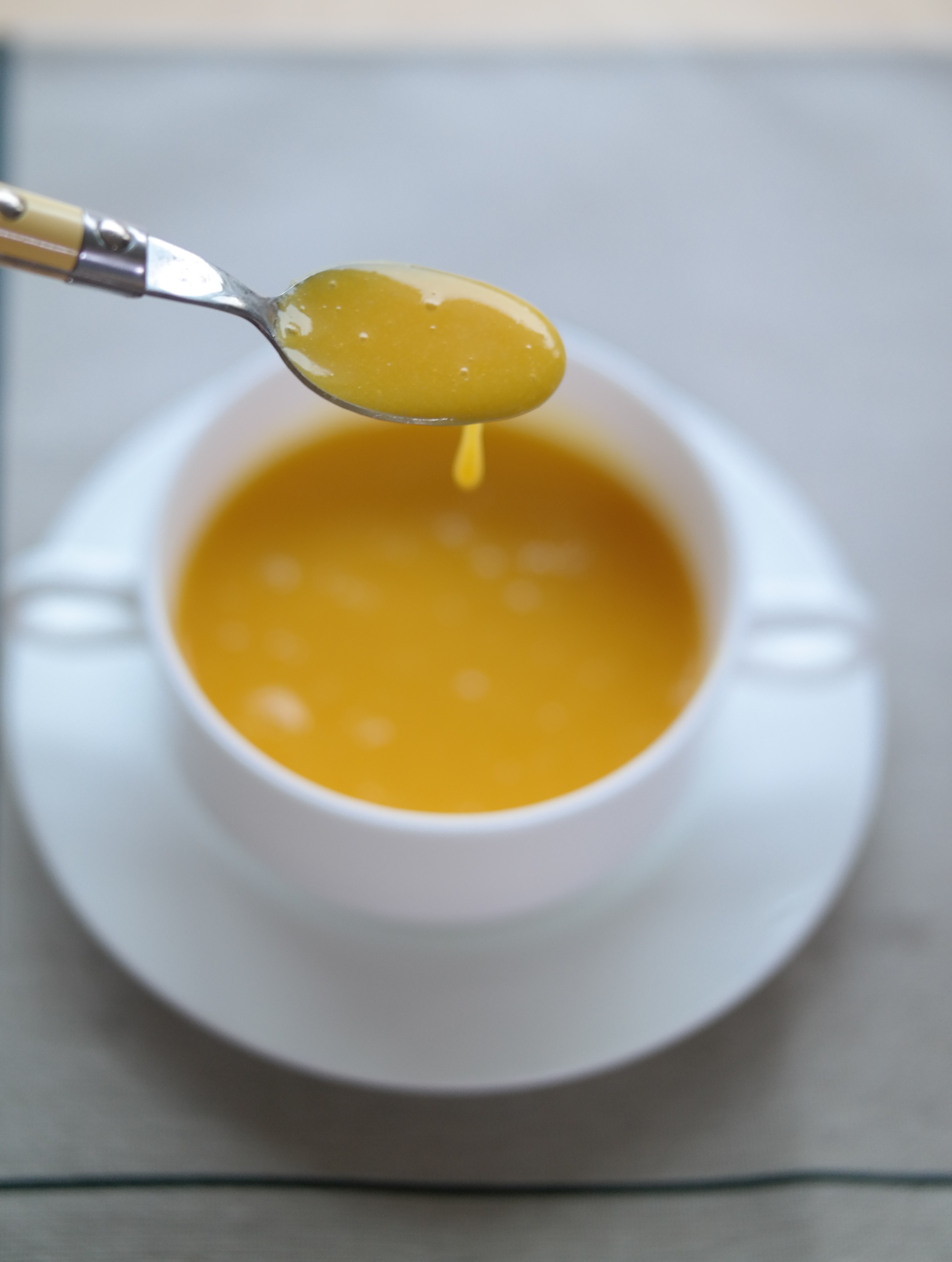
Danhobak-juk (kabocha porridge)

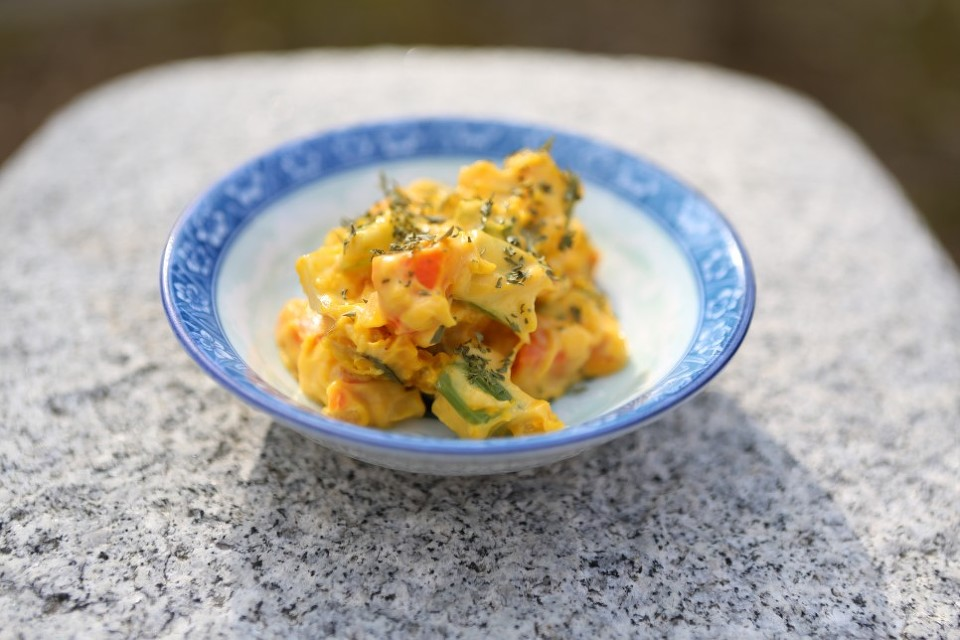
Danhobak-salad (kabocha salad)

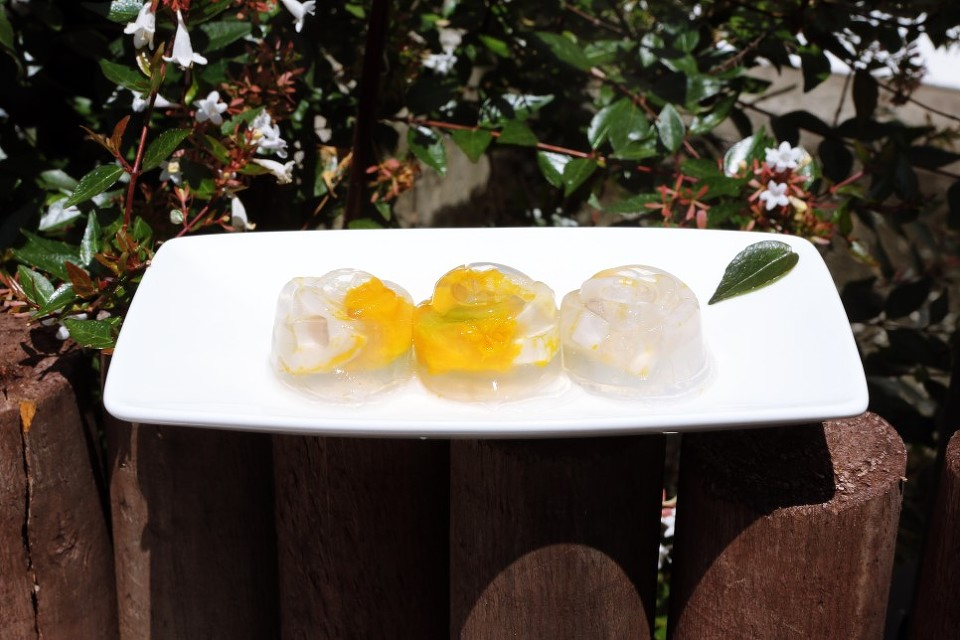
Danhobak-sanyak-yanggaeng (kabocha and yam jelly)

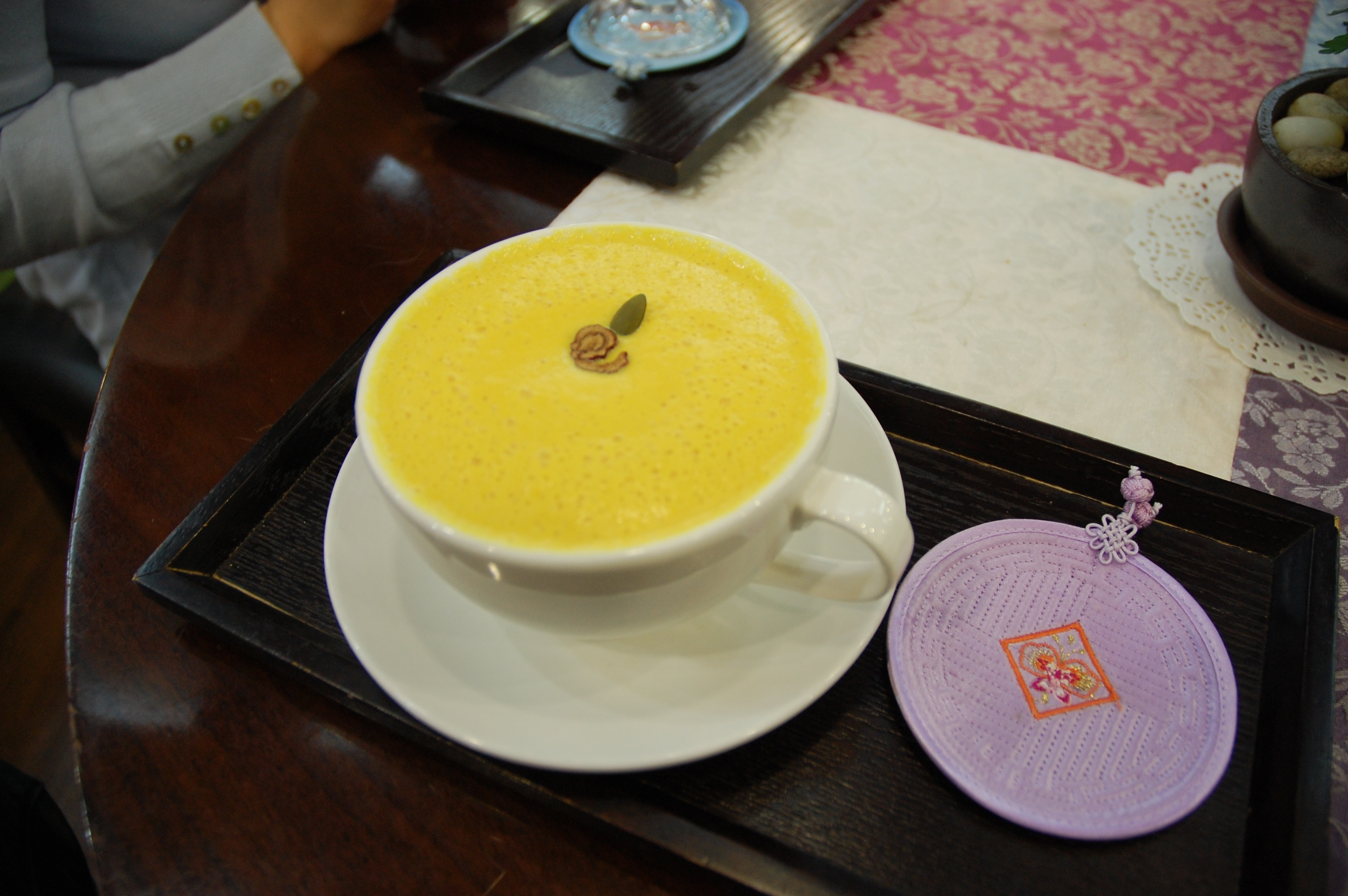
Danhobak-latte (kabocha latte)

=== Thailand ===
Fak thong (Thai: ฟักทอง) is used in traditional Thai desserts and main courses. Kabocha is used in Jamaican chicken foot soup.

== Nutrition ==
This squash is rich in beta carotene, with iron, vitamin C, potassium, and smaller traces of calcium, folic acid, and minute amounts of B vitamins.

== Ripeness ==
When kabocha is just harvested, it is still growing. Therefore, unlike other vegetables and fruits, freshness is not as important. It should be fully matured first, in order to become flavorful, by first ripening the kabocha in a warm place (77 °F/25 °C) for 13 days to convert some of the starch to sugar. Then the kabocha is transferred to a cool place (50 °F/10 °C) and stored for about a month in order to increase carbohydrate content. In this way the just-harvested, dry, bland-tasting kabocha is transformed into a smooth, sweet kabocha. Fully ripened, succulent kabocha will have reddish-yellow flesh, a hard skin, and a dry, corky stem. It reaches the peak of ripeness about 1.5–3 months after it is harvested.

== History ==
All squashes were domesticated in Mesoamerica. In 1997, new evidence suggested that domestication occurred 8,000 to 10,000 years ago, a few thousand years earlier than previous estimates. That would be 4,000 years earlier than the domestication of maize and beans, the other major food plant groups in Mesoamerica. Archeological and genetic plant research in the 21st century suggests that the peoples of eastern North America independently domesticated squash, sunflower, marsh elder, and chenopod.

Portuguese sailors introduced kabocha to Japan in 1541, bringing it with them from Cambodia. The Portuguese name for the squash, Camboja abóbora (カンボジャ・アボボラ), was shortened by the Japanese to kabocha. Alternatively, the Portuguese origin is the word cabaça for gourd. Kabocha is written in Kanji as 南瓜 (literally, "southern melon"), and it is also occasionally referred to as 南京瓜 (Nanking melon). In China, this term is applied to many types of squashes with harder skin and beefier flesh (including pumpkins), not just kabochas.

== Gallery ==
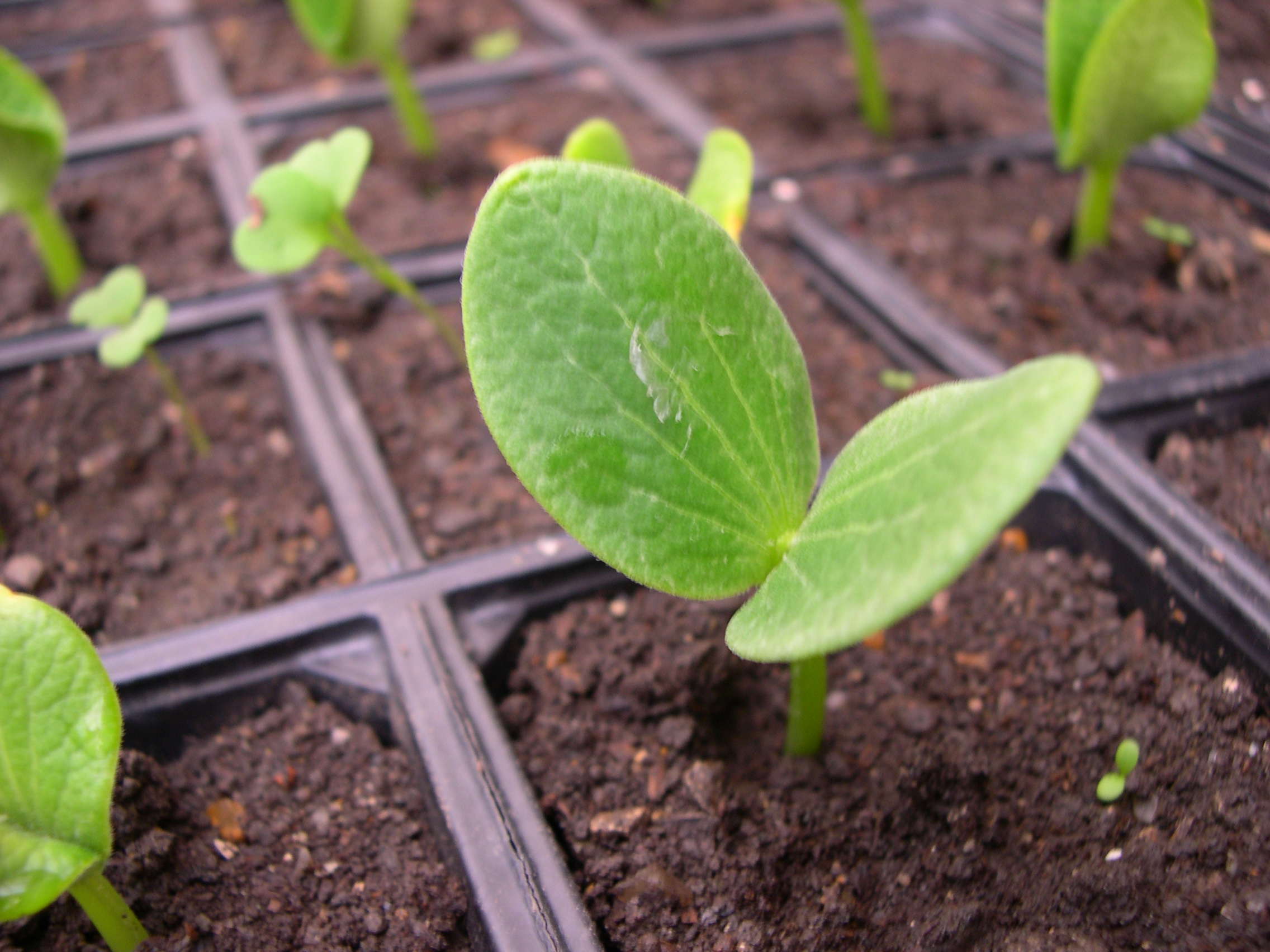
Seedling

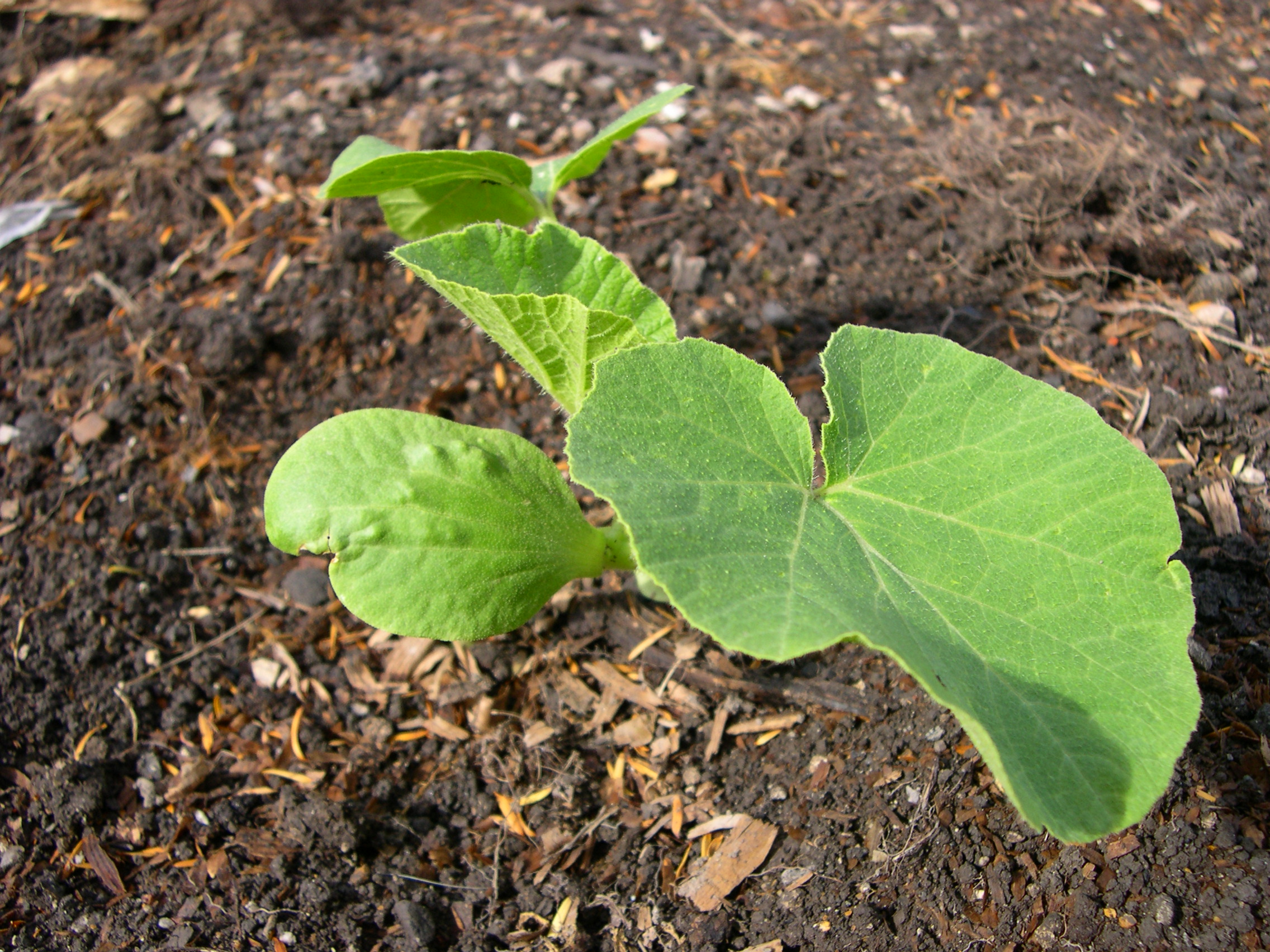
First leaf

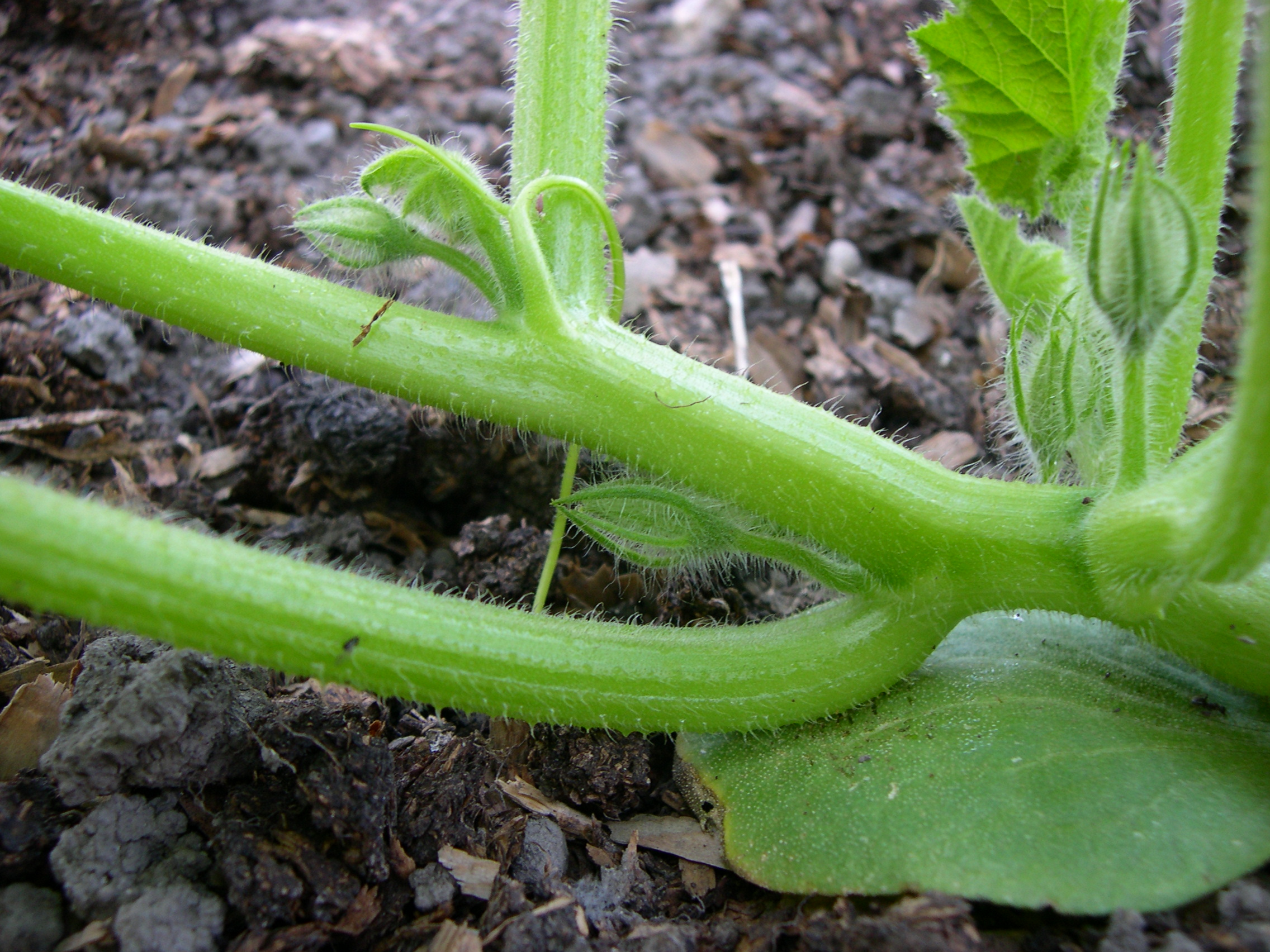
Branching habit

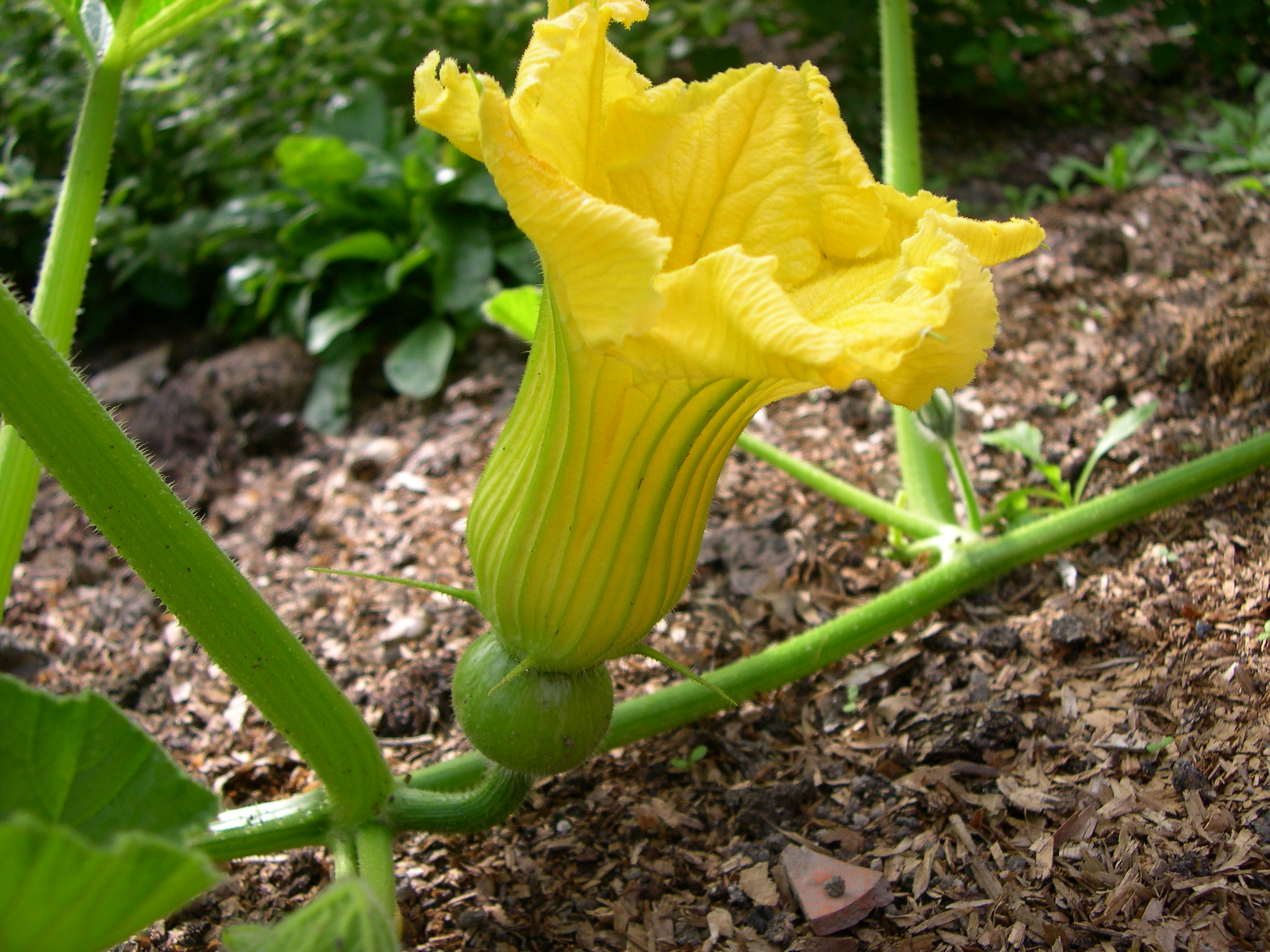
Flower

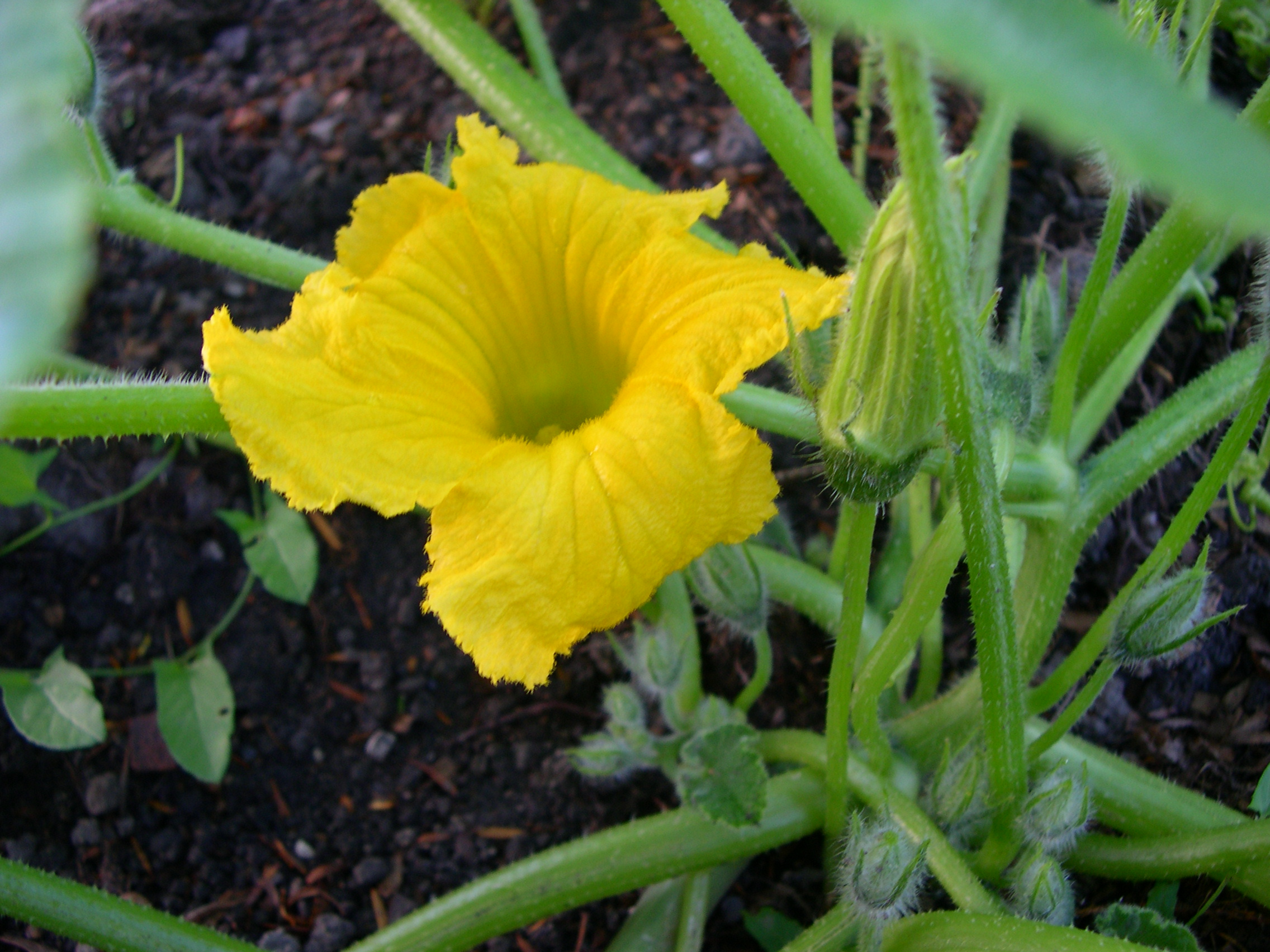
Flower and flower bud

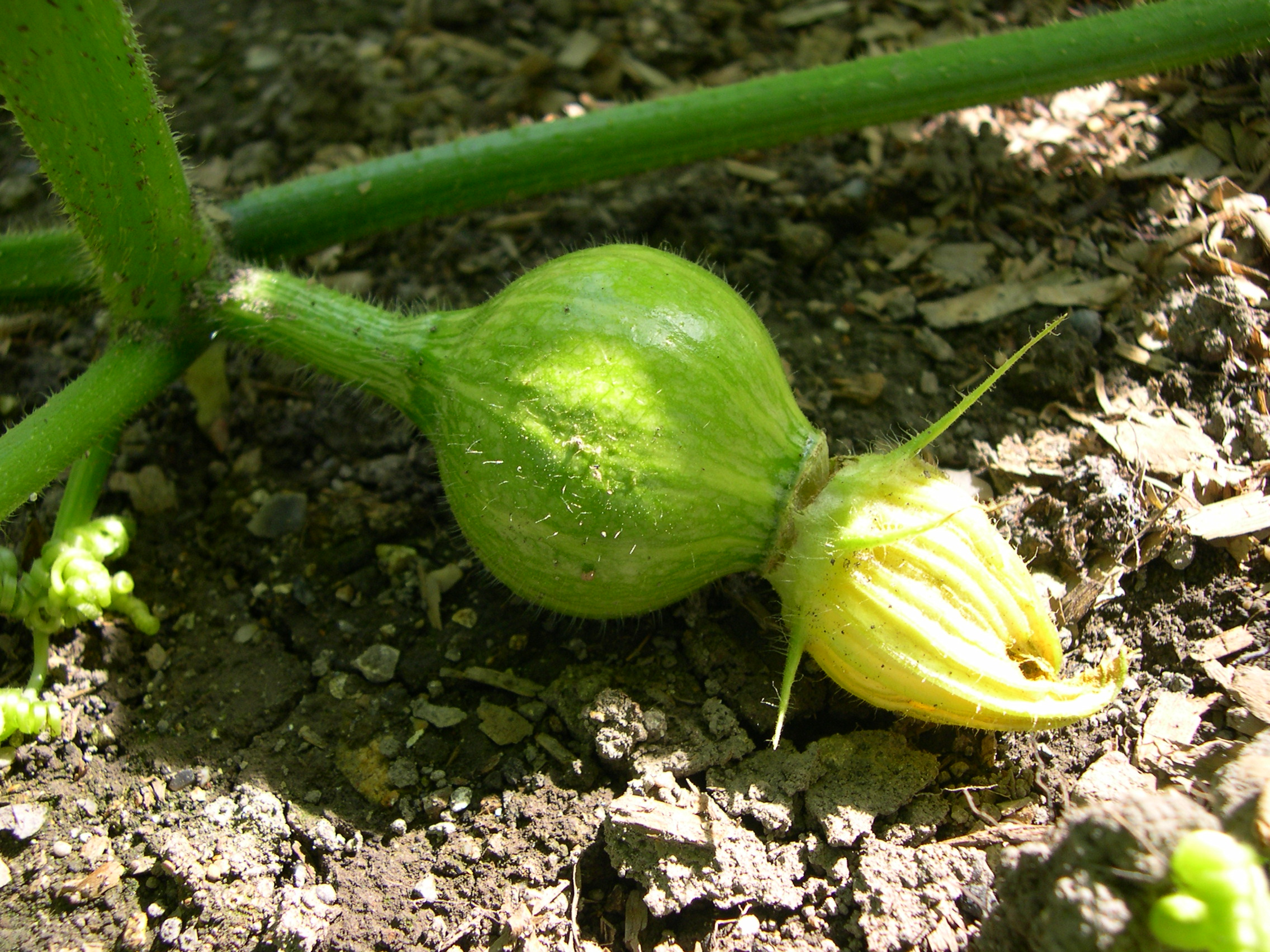
Young fruit

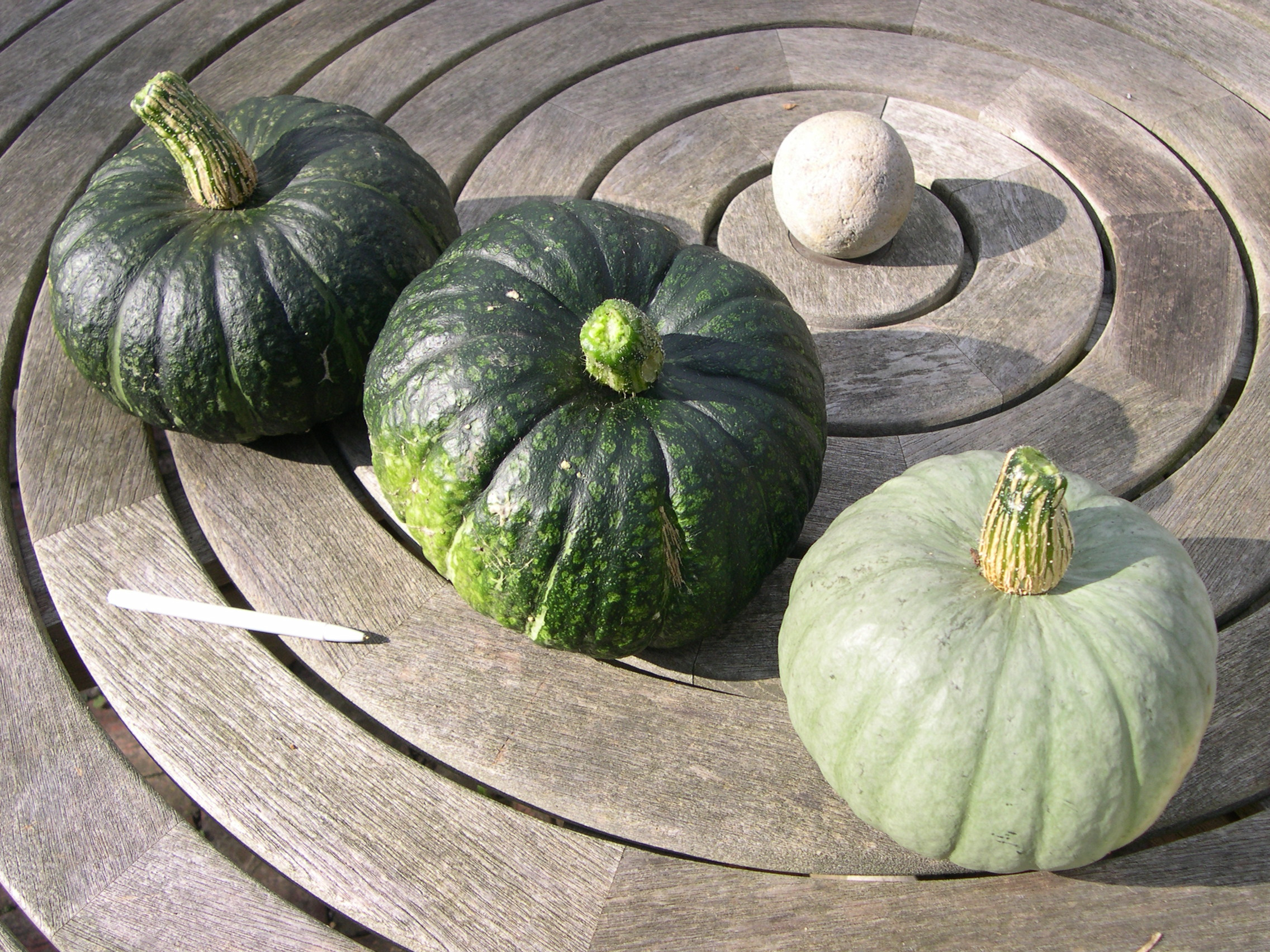
Whole squashes

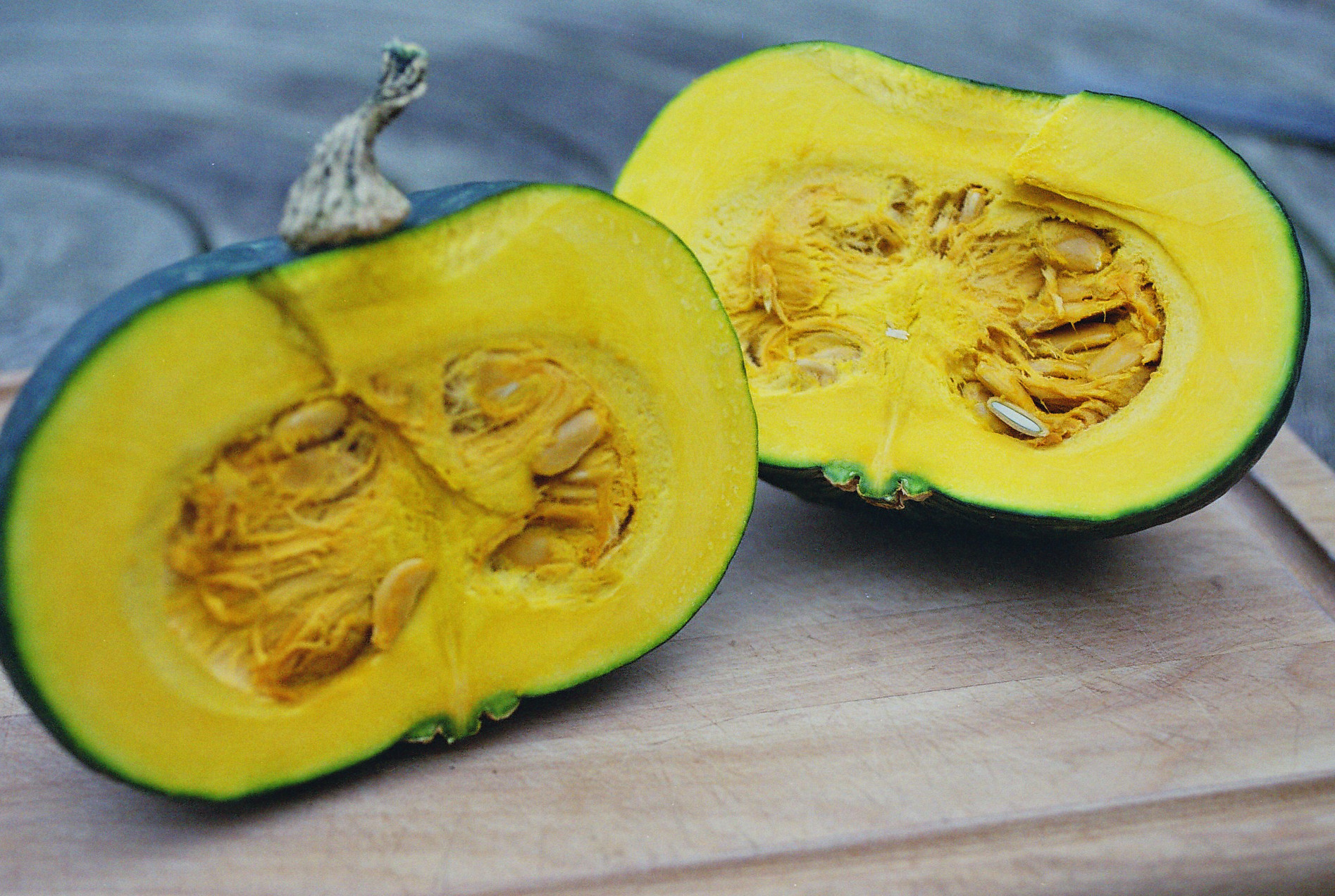
Section, showing seeds

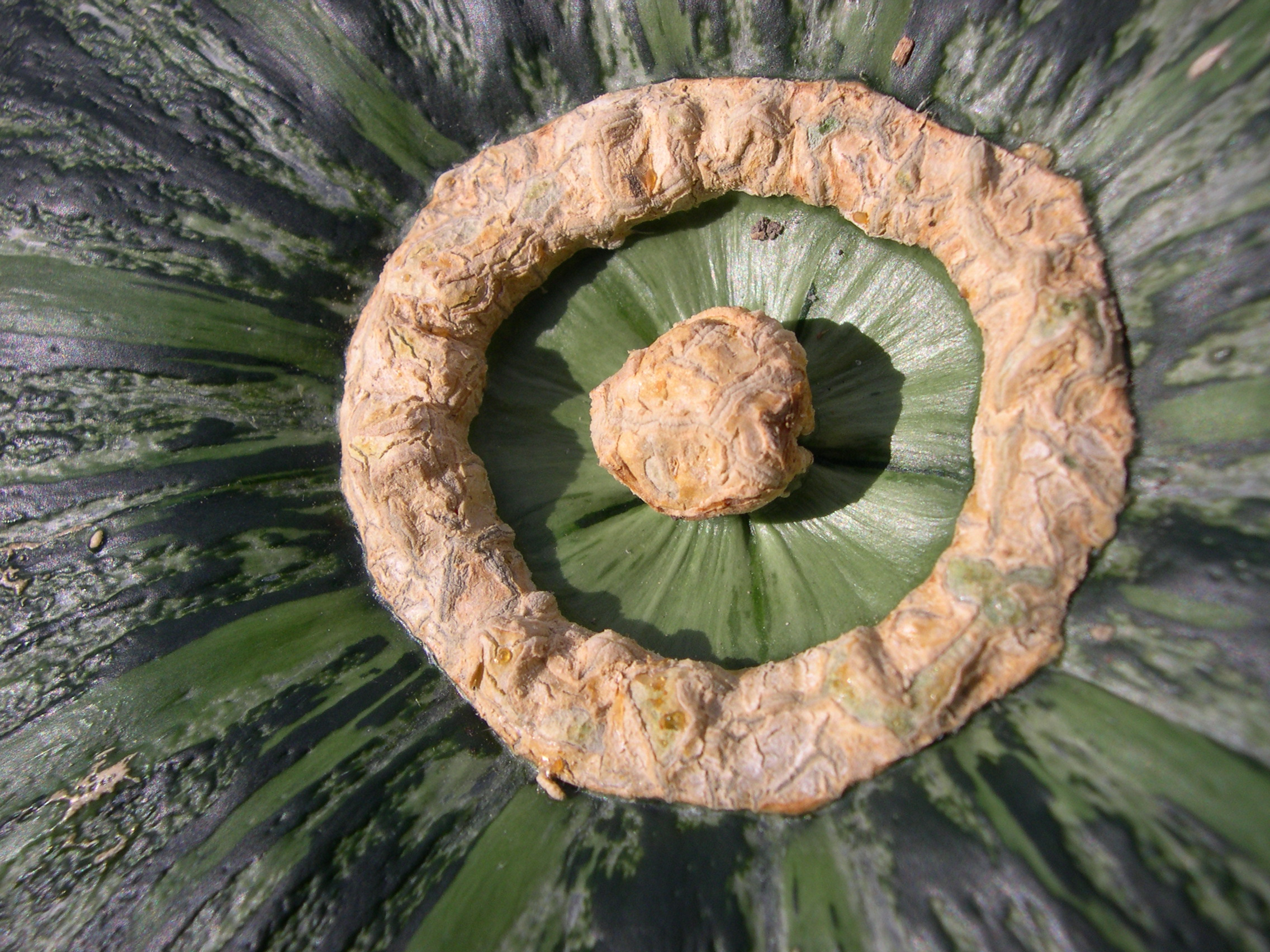
Flower scar

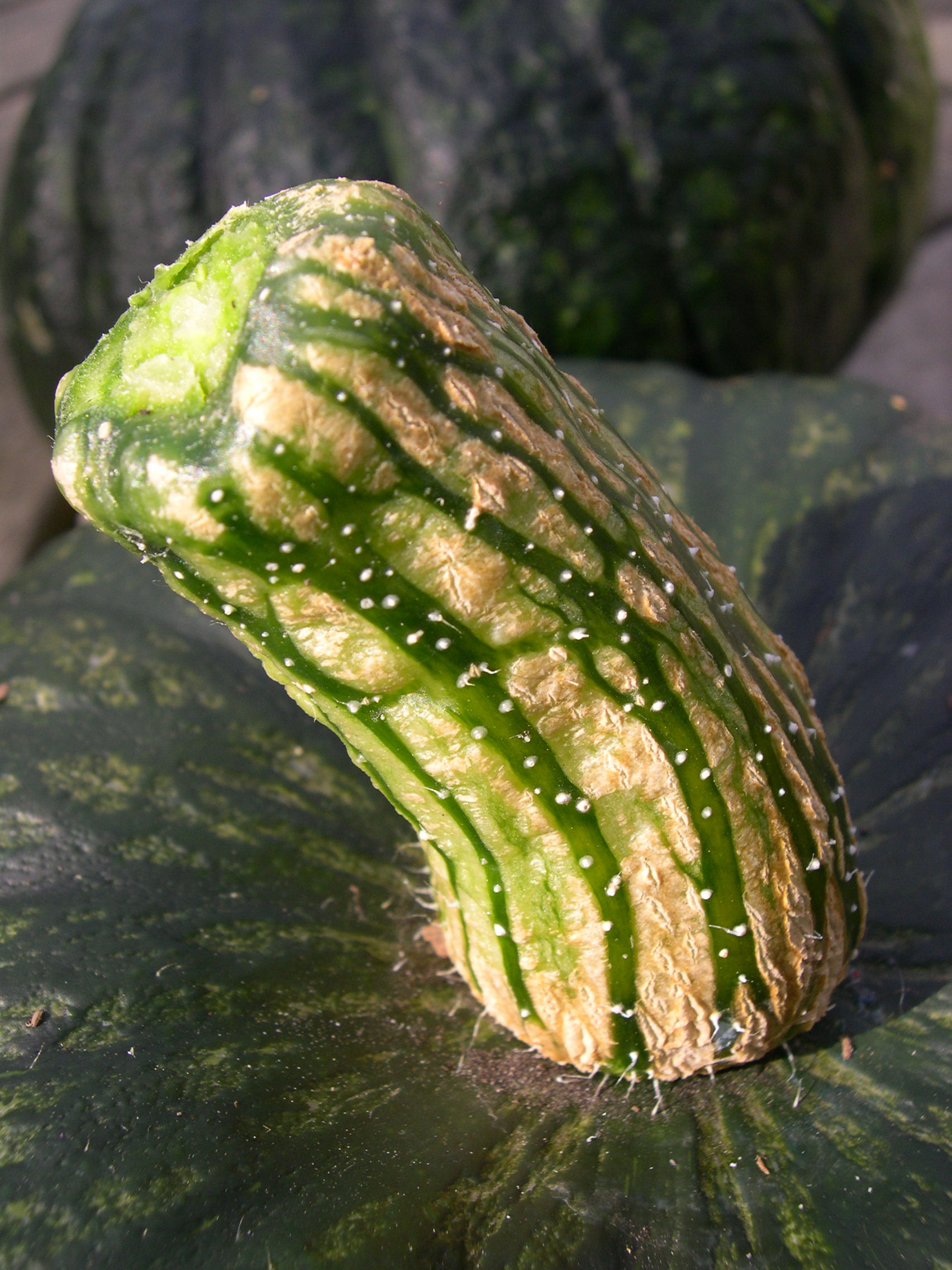
Peduncle

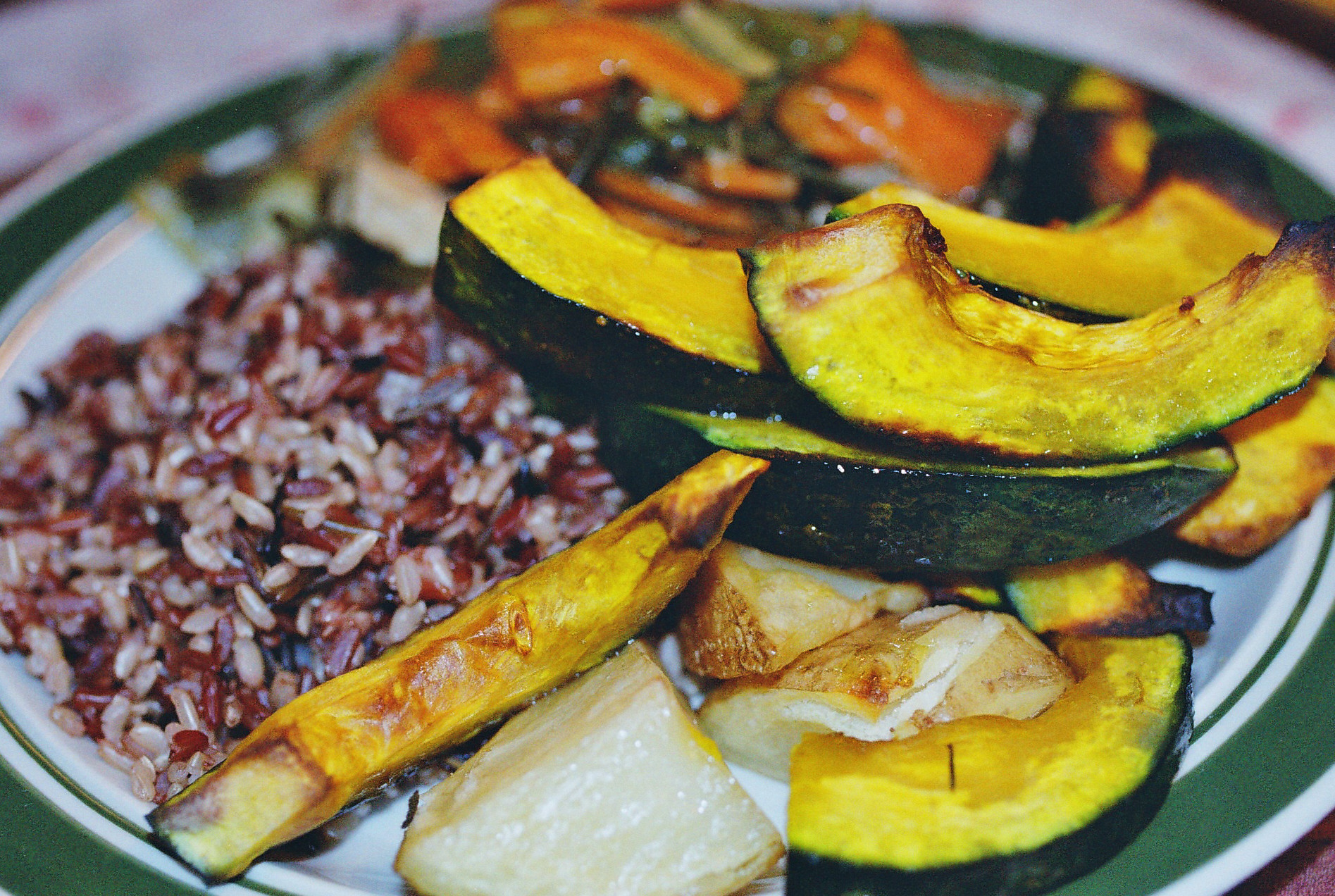
Dish of roasted kabocha

== See also ==
- Calabaza
- Kinpira
