= Uto =

Uto, UTO, Utö, or Utō may refer to:

== People ==
=== Given name ===
- Uto Ughi (born 1944), Italian violinist and conductor
- Uto Wunderlich (born 1946), German sports shooter

=== Surname ===
- Datu Uto (died c. 1900), 18th Sultan of Buayan, Mindanao
- Fumiaki Uto, Japanese astronomer
- Naoki Uto, (born 1991) Japanese basketball player
- Shunpei Uto (1918–?), Japanese swimmer
- Takashi Uto (born 1974), Japanese politician

== Places ==
- Utö (Finland), an island in the Archipelago Sea, in southwest Finland
- Utö, Sweden, an island in the Stockholm archipelago
- Uto, Kumamoto, a city in Japan
  - Uto District, Kumamoto, a former district in Japan
- Uto Kulm, the summit of the Uetliberg mountain near Zürich in Switzerland
- Uto Peak, a mountain in the Selkirk Mountains of British Columbia, Canada

== Other uses ==
- Uto (goddess), Greek for the ancient Egyptian goddess Wadjet
- Uto Castle, a former castle in Japan
- Uto Station, a railway station in Uto, Kumamoto Prefecture, Japan
- Utō Station, a railway station in Okazaki, Aichi, Japan
- Unattended train operation
- United Tajik Opposition (UTO), a defunct political alliance during the Tajikistani Civil War
- Universidad Técnica de Oruro (UTO), a public university in Oruro, Bolivia
- Untrioctium (chemical symbol Uto), an unsynthesized chemical element with atomic number 138
- Uto Nakaji, a character from the manga and anime series The 100 Girlfriends Who Really, Really, Really, Really, Really Love You

== See also ==
- Uto-Aztecan languages, a Native American language family
- Utto (died 829), first abbot of the Bavarian Metten Abbey
- Udo (disambiguation)
