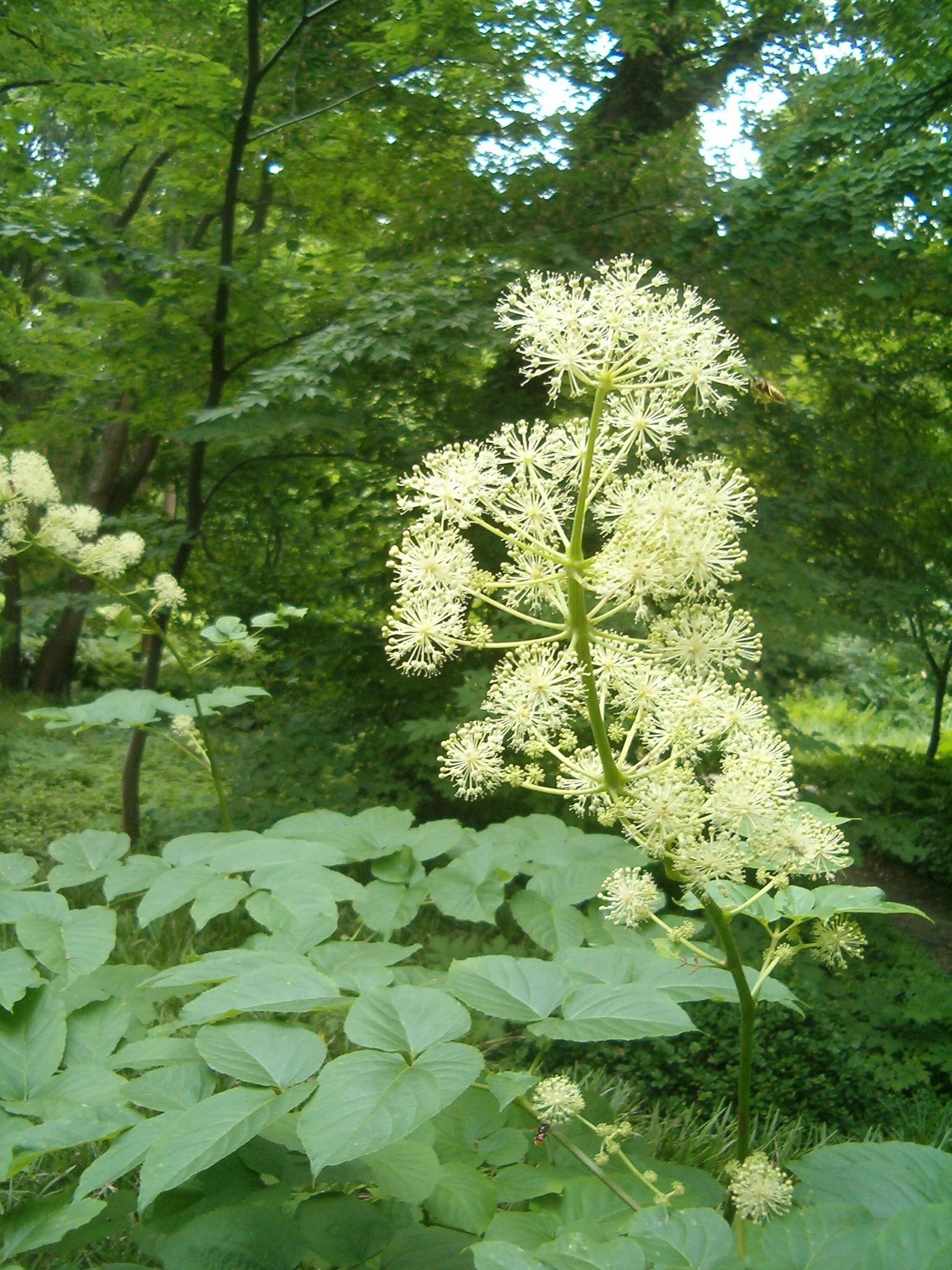

Scientific classification
- Kingdom: Plantae
- Clade: Embryophytes
- Clade: Tracheophytes
- Clade: Spermatophytes
- Clade: Angiosperms
- Clade: Eudicots
- Clade: Asterids
- Order: Apiales
- Family: Araliaceae
- Genus: Aralia
- Species: A. cordata

Binomial name
- Aralia cordata Thunb.

= Aralia cordata =

Species of plant

Aralia cordata is an upright herbaceous perennial plant growing up to 2 to 3 metres (6.6 to 9.8 ft) in height, native to Japan, Korea, Russian Far East, and eastern China. Its common names include spikenard, herbal aralia, udo (from Japanese: ウド), Japanese spikenard, and mountain asparagus. It is commonly found on the slopes of wooded embankments. Aralia cordata is a species of Aralia in the family Araliaceae.

The plant yields new shoots every spring, which are blanched and then eaten as a vegetable. In Korea, the dried root of the plant has been traditionally used as medicine. The young shoots have a strong yet pleasant distinct aromatic flavor. In addition to food and medicinal use, the plant is cultivated as an ornamental.

== Description ==
Aralia cordata is classified as a dicot and a eudicot. The leaves are alternate, large, and double to triple pinnate with leaflets 7 to 15 centimetres (2.8 to 5.9 in) long, and 5 to 10 centimetres (2.0 to 3.9 in) broad. The flowers are produced in large umbels of 30 to 45 centimetres (12 to 18 in) diameter in late summer, each flower small and white. The fruit is a small black drupe 3 millimetres (0.12 in) diameter, and may be toxic to humans.

In the wild, the plant achieves a height of 1.2 to 1.8 metres (3.9 to 5.9 ft). It has golden leaves in the spring and an abundance of large bright green ones in the summer. It has a hefty and plump root stock with shoots 60 to 90 centimetres (2.0 to 3.0 ft) in length. It can reach optimal growth when planted in rich soil. During the summer it produces loose flower bunches 90 centimetres (3.0 ft) in length, which are attractive to bees and flies, making it ideal for beekeepers. It can be grown using seed or propagated from cuttings.

== History ==
Aralia cordata is widely grown for food in Japan. In the early 1900s it was imported into the United States; however, it did not become popularly commercialized. In Korea, the dried root has been traditionally used as medicine to treat inflammation, fever and pain.

== Cultivation ==
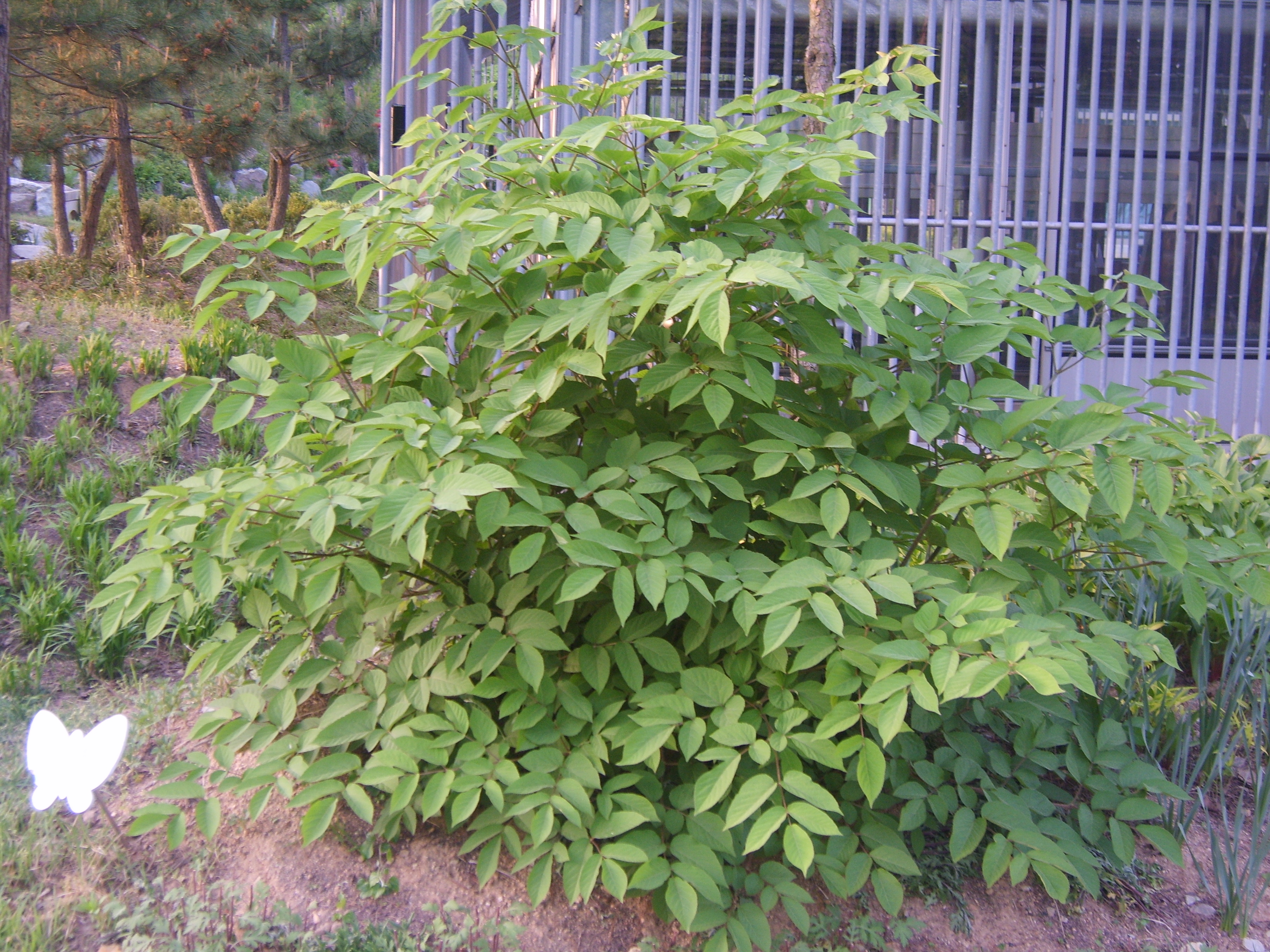

=== Growing conditions ===
Aralia cordata can be grown in normal, sandy, or clay soil with a neutral or acidic content of pH 5.0 to 7.5. Organic material should be added to clays and sands. It is an easy plant to grow, and does not require fertilizer. The plant grows rapidly, attaining a size up to 1.8 to 2.7 metres (5.9 to 8.9 ft) in height and width in a single growing season. It can tolerate freezing temperatures during winter, as it dies back and then re-grows in the spring, yielding for six years or more. It requires little labor; however the shoots require blanching if intended for food use. It must be grown in a climate of minimal to no drought, and can grow well in moist and rainy areas, and mountainous areas. It is generally grown in the wild, but can be grown in fields, cellars, or nurseries. The plant prefers light shade, but can grow in full shade, or in full sun, provided that it has a reliable water source.

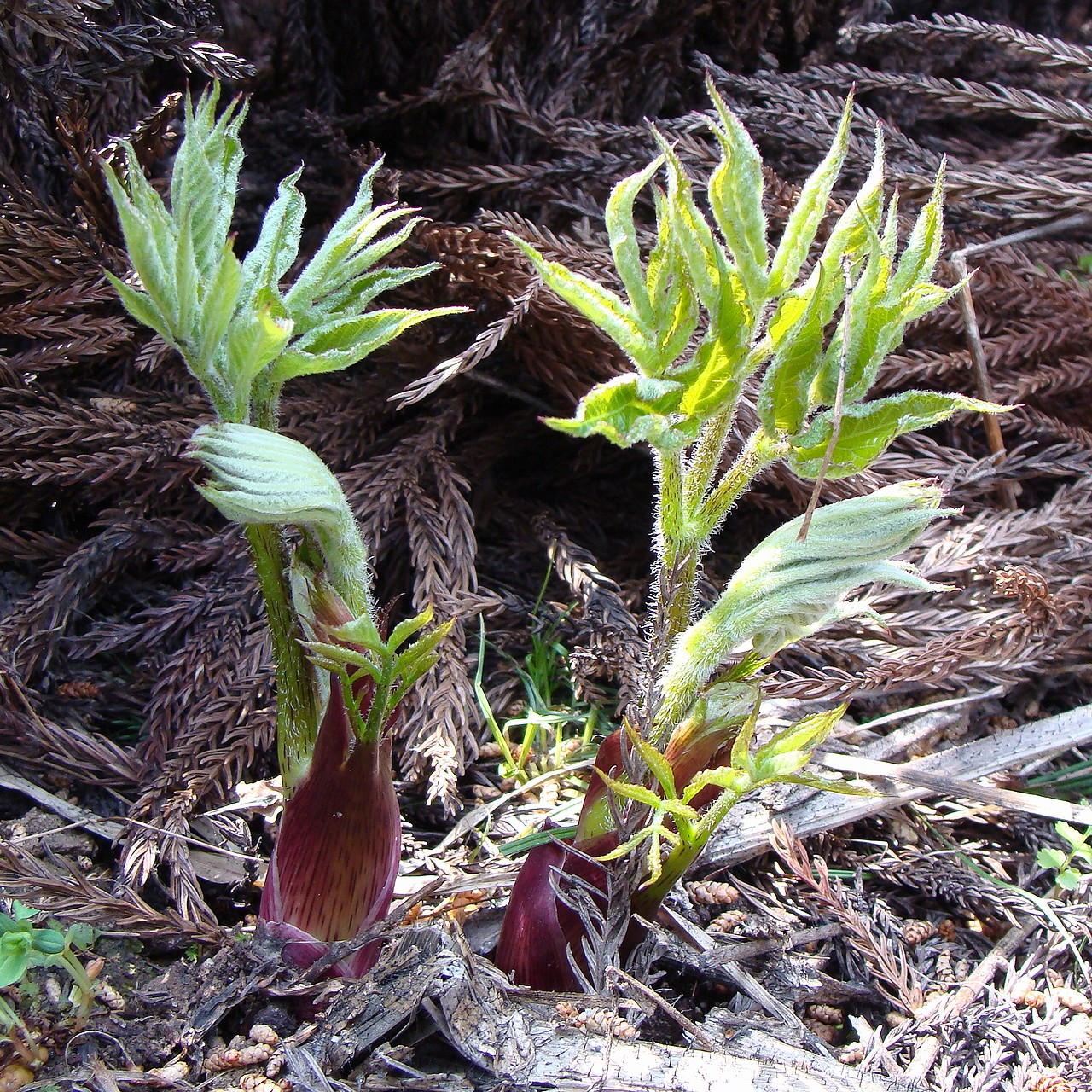
Sprouts

The seed propagation requires numerous months of stratification for effective germination. Seeds generally do not germinate well directly after harvesting or in dry storage, but germinate well in cold moist sand. Low temperature treatments facilitate the germination process. Chilling treatments are useful to overcome the dormancy of seeds in dry storage. Domestic seeds germinate more effectively than wild ones. The plant propagates readily by root suckering, allowing it to produce indefinitely.

=== Diseases ===
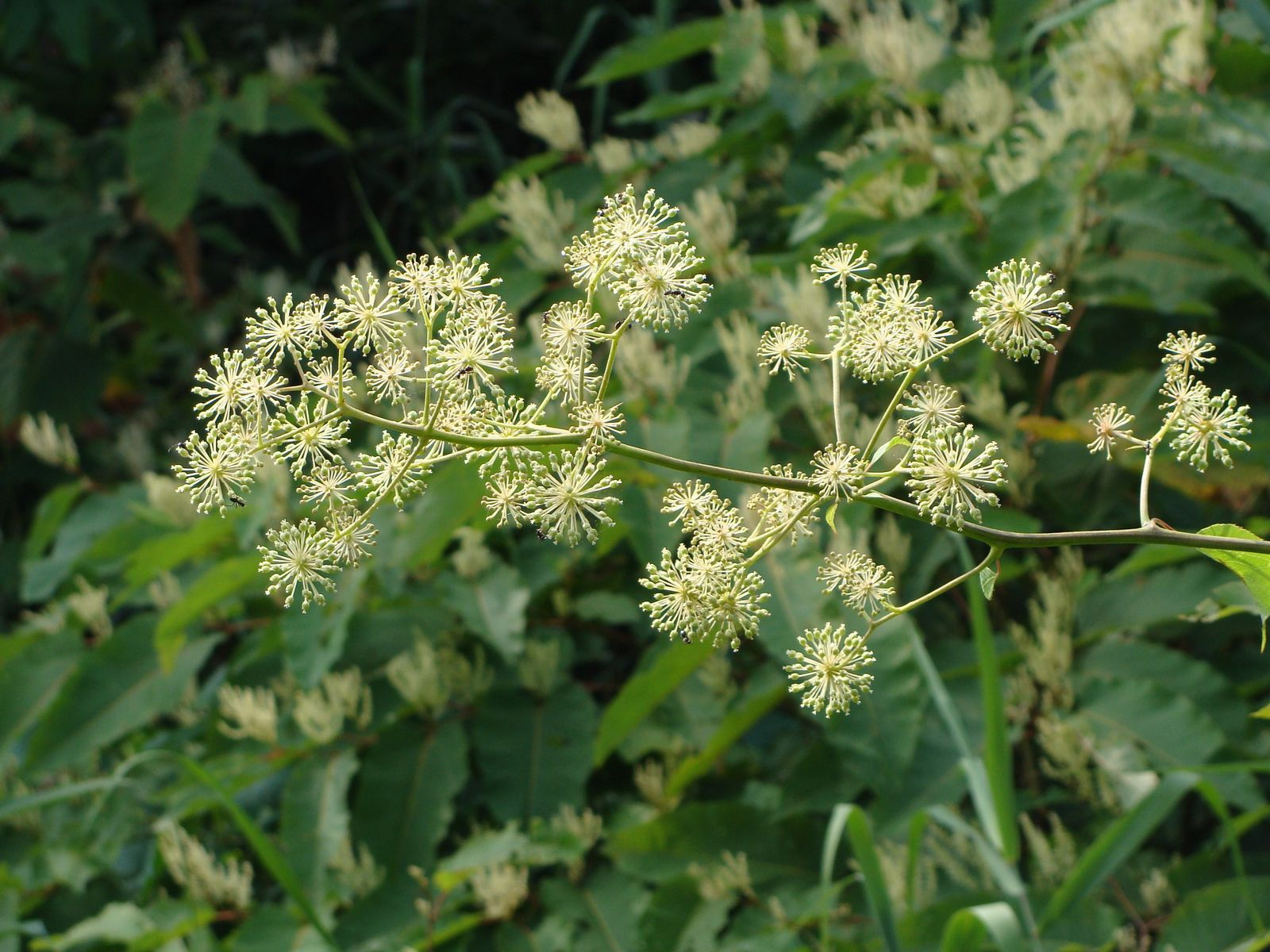
Flowers

The disease “Rootrot” targets the stems and roots only observable when three-fourths of its growth has been reached. In large plants, which can have 10 to 15 stems, the leaves wither very gradually from the base to the top, and the plant can take an entire growing season to completely die. The leaves and the stems turn brown and the roots deteriorate, with numerous large black fungi. In small plants, the leaves wilt, the petioles deteriorate, and the stems decay until the entire plant breaks down. In humidity, an abundance of white fungus grows over the exterior. Insects and rodents may be responsible for distributing fungus, or infected soil may enter the roots through root hairs, deceased roots, or lesions from cultivation or cutting. Land should be chosen with no susceptible vegetation. Plants should be grown from seed, minimizing the risk of contamination from root cuttings. Tools should be washed, and gardeners should be cautious about the particles they and their animals introduce. Cutting the plants during cultivation should be avoided. When the field has become infected, cultivation should be suspended for several years. The disease may be controlled, but there were no susceptible or resistant varieties known as of 1923.

The disease "wilt" causes the leaves to turn yellow, then brown, and eventually dry up. The petioles die, continuing to cling to the stalks for a frequent amount of time. In the case of an infected field, an alternative field with thick soil should be used, as Wilt is less damaging on this type. To prevent and control the disease, it may be sanitary to remove deceased, worn, and diseased vegetation, soil, and compost. At the end of the season, the soil and plants should be sorted to minimize the risk of accumulated disease.

=== Genetic stock ===
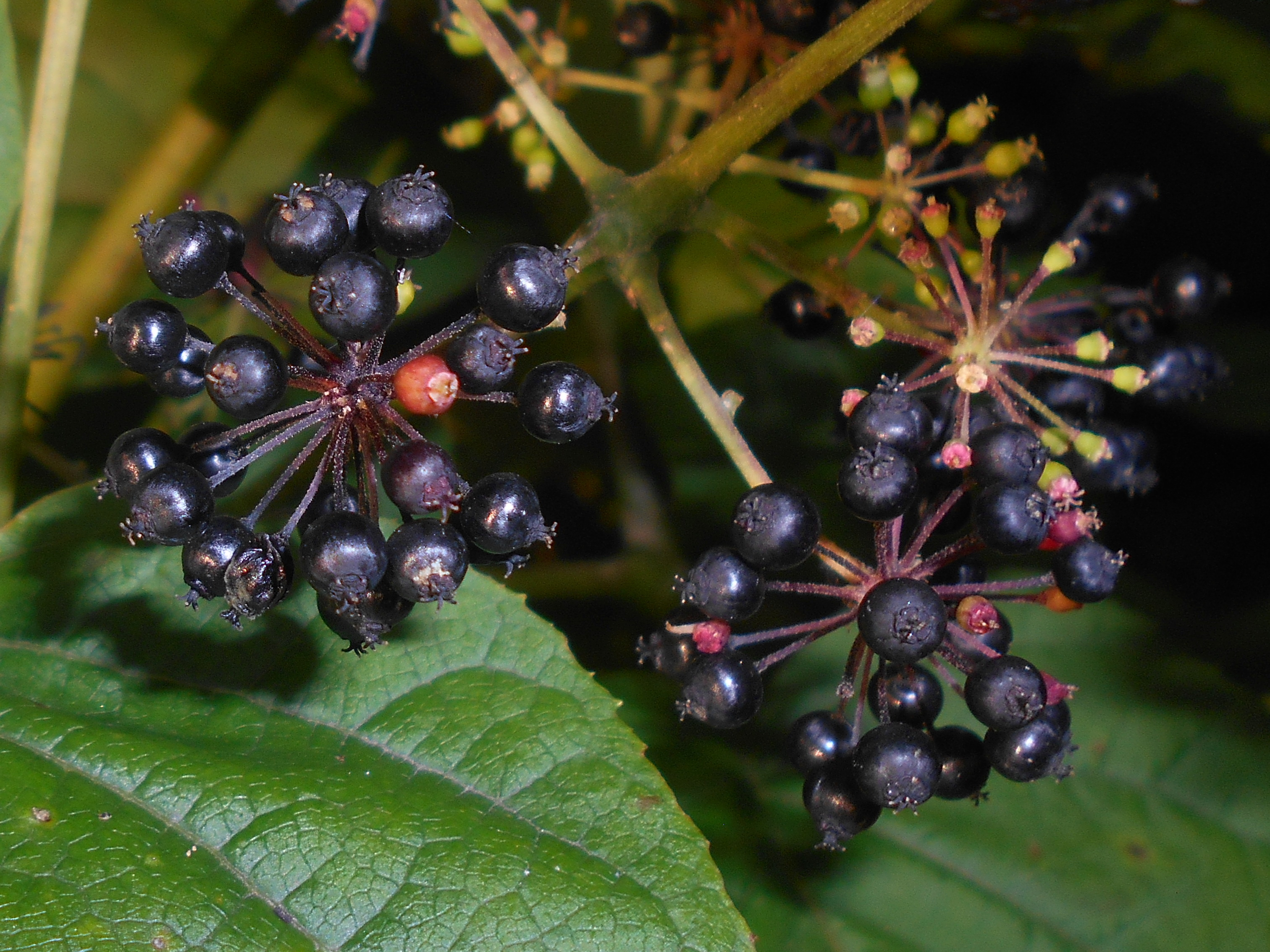
Fruits

There is genetic diversity of this crop in the provinces of China; however further research is required. There is genetic similarity between Aralia cordata and Aralia hispida, as in prehistoric times there was a close connection between Eastern Asia and North America, facilitating the migration of plant species. The northern variation is less matured, with smaller stem hairs, fewer nodes, side shoots, and leaves than the southern variation, potentially caused by earlier flourishing. In domestic stocks there is not as much variation, although they are similar to the wild stocks of the south, which have shorter dormancy periods.

== Culinary use ==
=== Japan ===
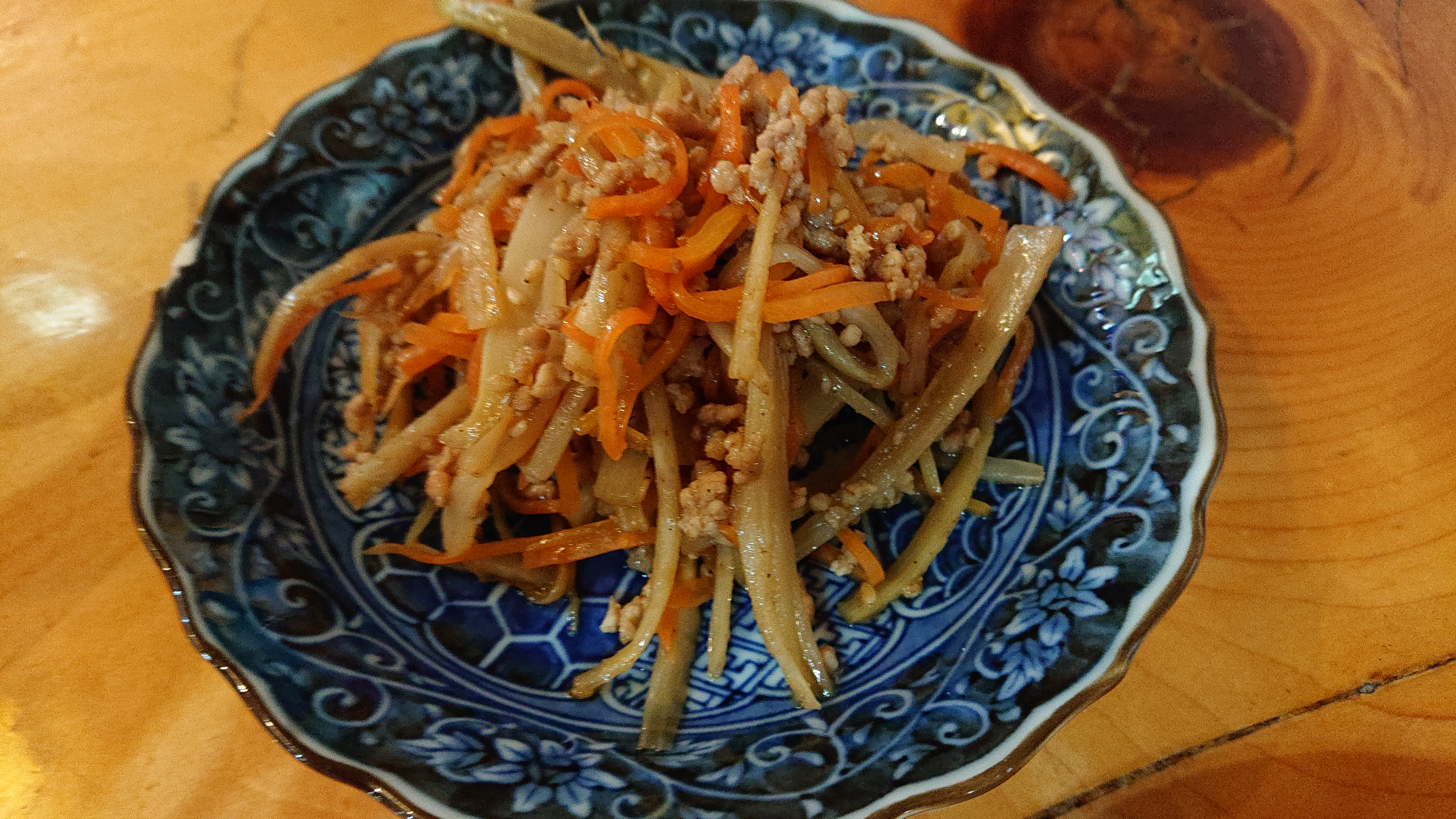
Japanese kinpira made of udo stems

The edible stem is sometimes boiled and served in miso soup. Despite its size, Aralia cordata is not a woody plant, as udo has a very soft stem, making it unsuitable for use as lumber. In addition, the stems become inedible if they grow too large. This fact is referenced in the popular saying udo no taiboku (Japanese: 独活の大木), literally "great tree of udo", which is used metaphorically to refer to a person or object that is useless despite its large size.

Young stems are consumed from the roots and added to soups and salads. It must be properly cooked, as the raw stems are coated in a resin tasting similar to pine. Prior to eating, they should be thinly sliced and boiled in water a few times or placed in chilled water for an hour to eliminate the resin. The stems may be cooked like asparagus.

=== Korea ===
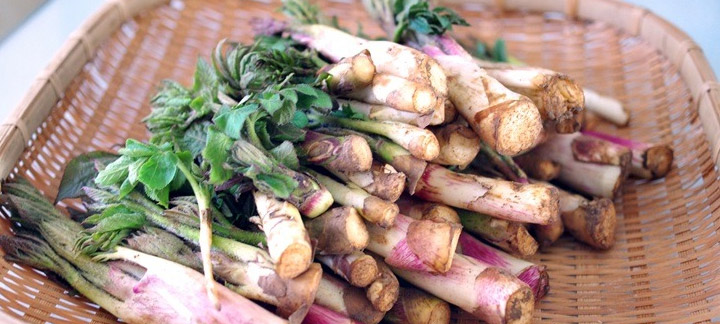
Ttangdureup (spikenards)

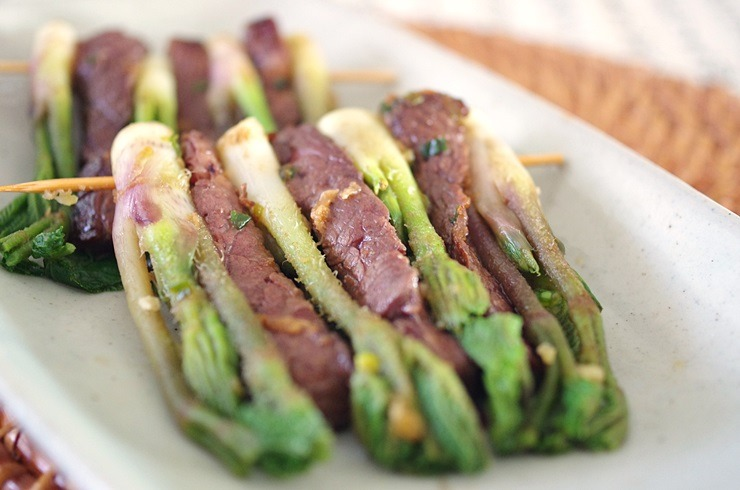
Ttangdureup-sanjeok (beef and spikenard skewers)

The plant is called ttangdureup (땅두릅, "land angelica") in Korean. Young shoots of spikenards are harvested during a month, from early April to early May, when they are soft and fragrant. In Korean cuisine, the shoots are commonly eaten blanched as namul, pickled as jangajji, pan-fried as jeon, or grilled as sanjeok. In Imsil County, they are also used for maeuntang (spicy fish stew).

Dishes

- Ttangdureup-jangajji – a type of jangajji (pickle), made by blanching spikenards and pickling it. The pickling sauce is made by boiling the mixture of soy sauce, water, maesil-cheong (plum syrup), sugar, and vinegar with kelp, then cooling it.
- Ttangdureup-jeon – a type of jeon, made by blanching spikenards, coating them with starch and eggwashing them, then pan-frying them in oil
- Ttangdureup-maeun-tang – a type of maeun-tang (spicy soup), made of freshwater fish such as Amur catfish. In Imsil County, spikenards replace siraegi (dried radish greens) in maeuntang recipes. The stew can be made by boiling fish with big chunks of radish, then adding spikenards, onion, aehobak, Java waterdropwort, oyster mushrooms, red chilli, and spicy sauce. The spicy sauce, usually prepared the day before and left in the fridge overnight, can be made by mixing gochujang (chilli paste), doenjang (bean paste), gochugaru (chilli powder), toasted perilla seeds, minced garlic, and ground ginger.
- Ttangdureup-muchim – a type of namul, made by blanching the shoots in salted water, seasoning them with soup soy sauce, chopped scallions, minced garlic, sesame oil, and toasted sesame seeds.

== Nutritional information ==
Per 100 grams of raw stem, Aralia cordata contains 220 mg of potassium, 7 mg of calcium, 9 mg of magnesium, 25 mg of phosphorus, 0.2 mg of iron, 0.1 mg of zinc and 4 mg of vitamin C.

== Economics ==
Aralia cordata is popularly grown in Korea and Japan, and is grown in North America for use in exotic cuisine, and as an ornamental plant. It has a great potential for medicine to reduce fever and symptoms of disease. The root is often used in China as a substitute for ginseng, which is another member of the Araliaceae, or ivy family.

Aralia cordata must be cooked, soaked, or peeled to eliminate the resinous taste, which may impede its wider adoption.
