= Saviour Friday Udoh =

Nigerian legislator (born 1957)

The Honourable Saviour Friday Udoh (born June 5, 1957 in Akwa Ibom State, Colony and Protectorate of Nigeria) is a Nigerian legislator. Udoh was elected to the National Assembly in 2007. He is a member of the Peoples Democratic Party

== Personal ==
Udoh is married. He is a legal practitioner.
