= Utto =

Blessed Utto
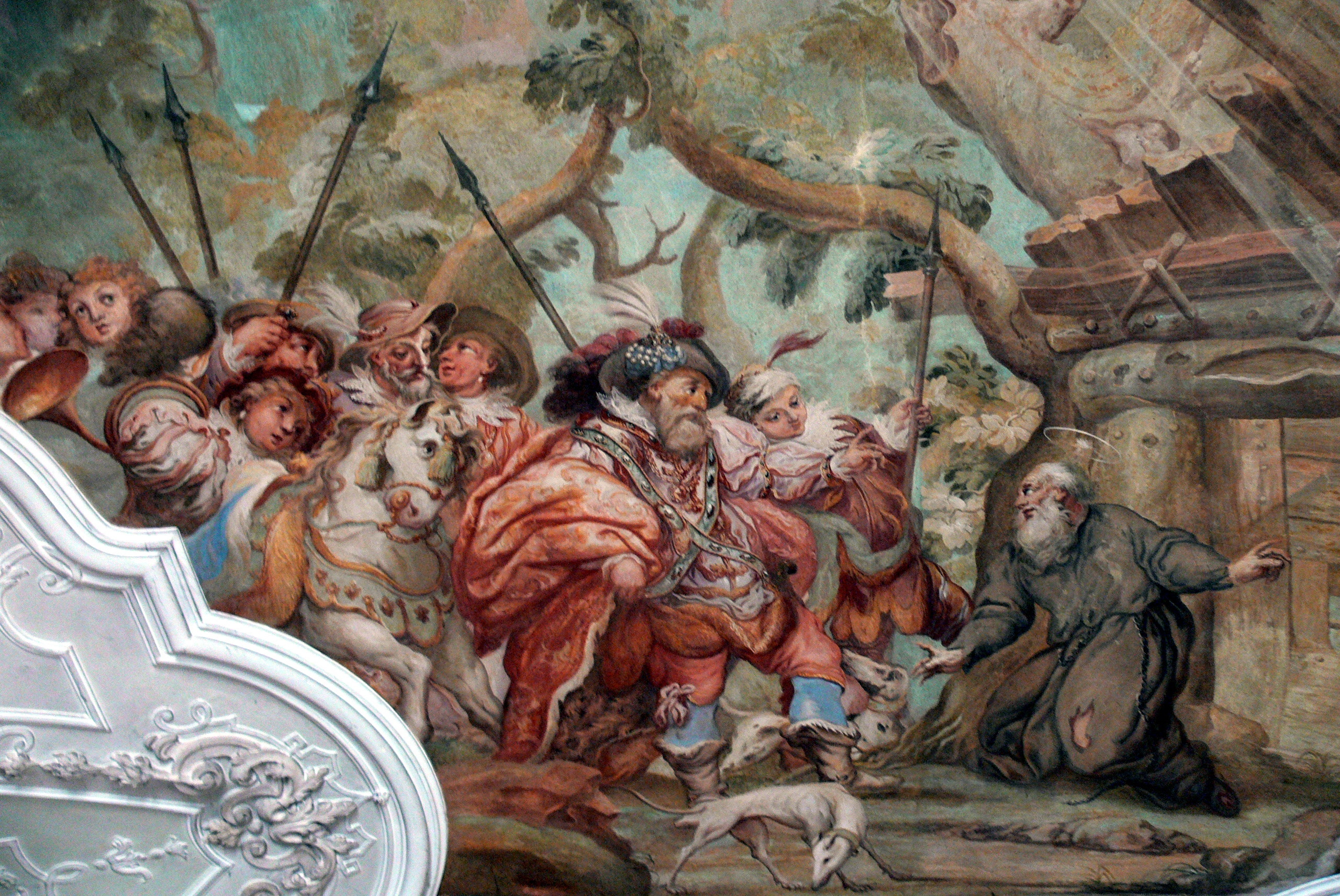
- Born: unknown
- Died: October 3, 829; Metten
- Venerated in: Roman Catholic Church
- Feast: October 6

The Blessed Utto was the first abbot of the Bavarian Metten Abbey of the Benedictine Order. His feast is celebrated on October 3.

== Biography ==
Utto was presumably a monk at the abbey of Reichenau; his place of birth is unknown. According to tradition he was a relative and the godson of the priest and landlord Gamelbert in the Bavarian community Michaelsbuch, a few kilometers up from the confluence of the river Isar on the right-hand side of the Danube near the modern-day town of Plattling. As Gamelbert founded Metten Abbey on his ground around 766, he is said to have entrusted Utto with the settlement. Utto, who came from Reichenau to Metten together with twelve other monks was appointed the first abbot of the abbey. The name Abbot Utto of Metten appears in 772 in the Verbrüderungsbuch (a German register of medieval abbeys) of the synod of Dingolfing and in 784 in the Verbrüderungsbuch of St. Peter's Archabbey in Salzburg. He died on October 3, 829 in Metten Abbey.

== Legend ==
According to late medieval legend, Charlemagne was the founder of Metten Abbey and Utto was a hermit in the woods around Metten. Charlemagne was said to have met him while hunting and to have promised the foundation of an abbey in the honour of Saint Michael on the request of this pious man (after 788). A small church called Uttobrunn was erected in the 17th century at a spring to commemorate the site of this alleged meeting.

== Relics ==
Metten Abbey keeps a medieval crosier, that is revered as the staff of Blessed Utto. The crook is carved from walrus tooth to form a dragon encircling a lamb with a banner of victory. From comparison with similar objects it cannot be dated earlier than the beginning of the 13th century, however. The staff itself may be older, as a bronze band below the crook is inscribed with Romanesque majuscules: QVOD DŇS [= Dominus] PETRO, PETRVS TIBI CONTVLIT, VTTO (What the Lord has assigned to Peter, Peter has assigned to you, Utto).
