= Grilling =

Form of cooking that involves dry heat

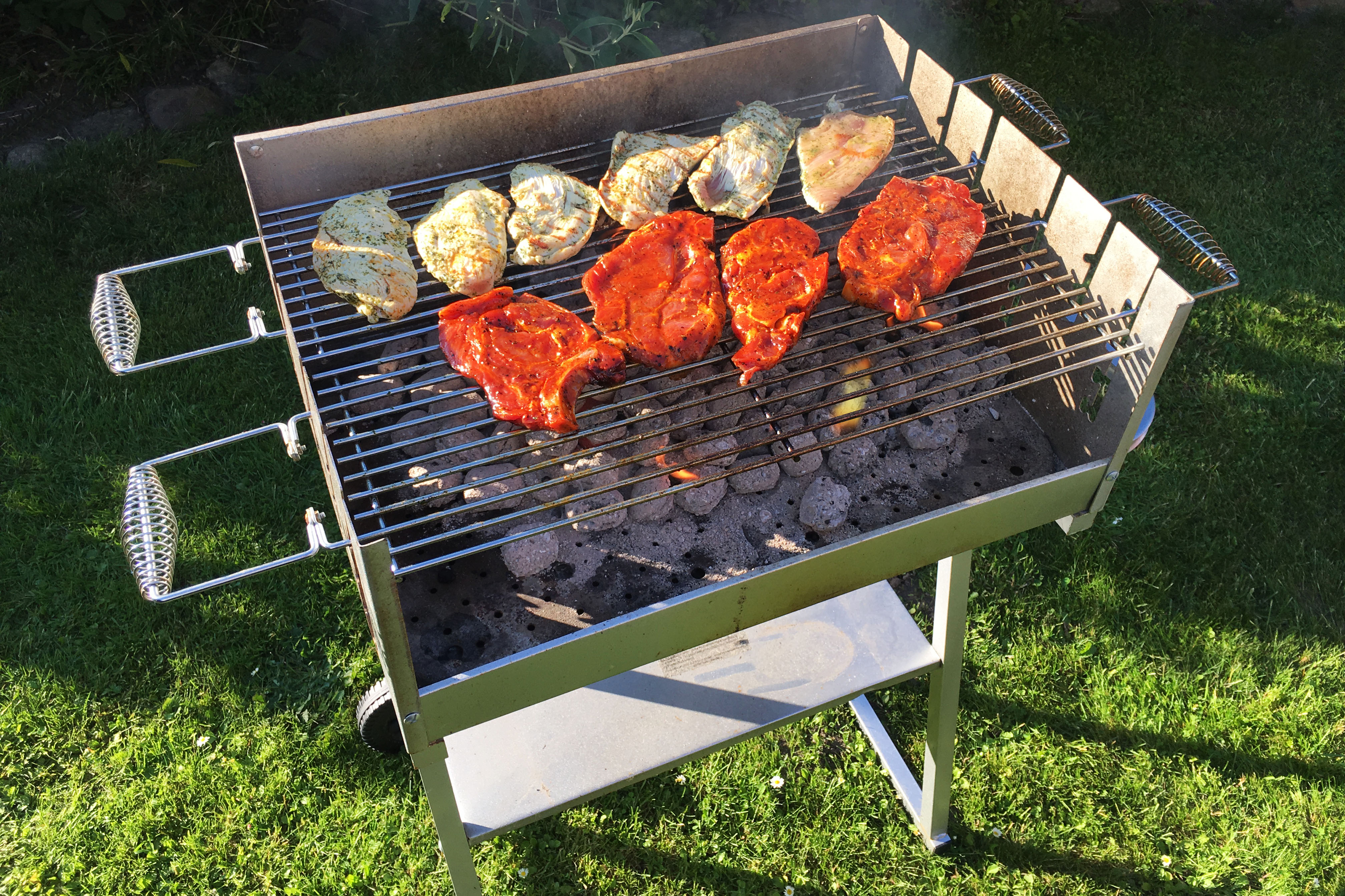
Steaks and chicken breasts being grilled over charcoal

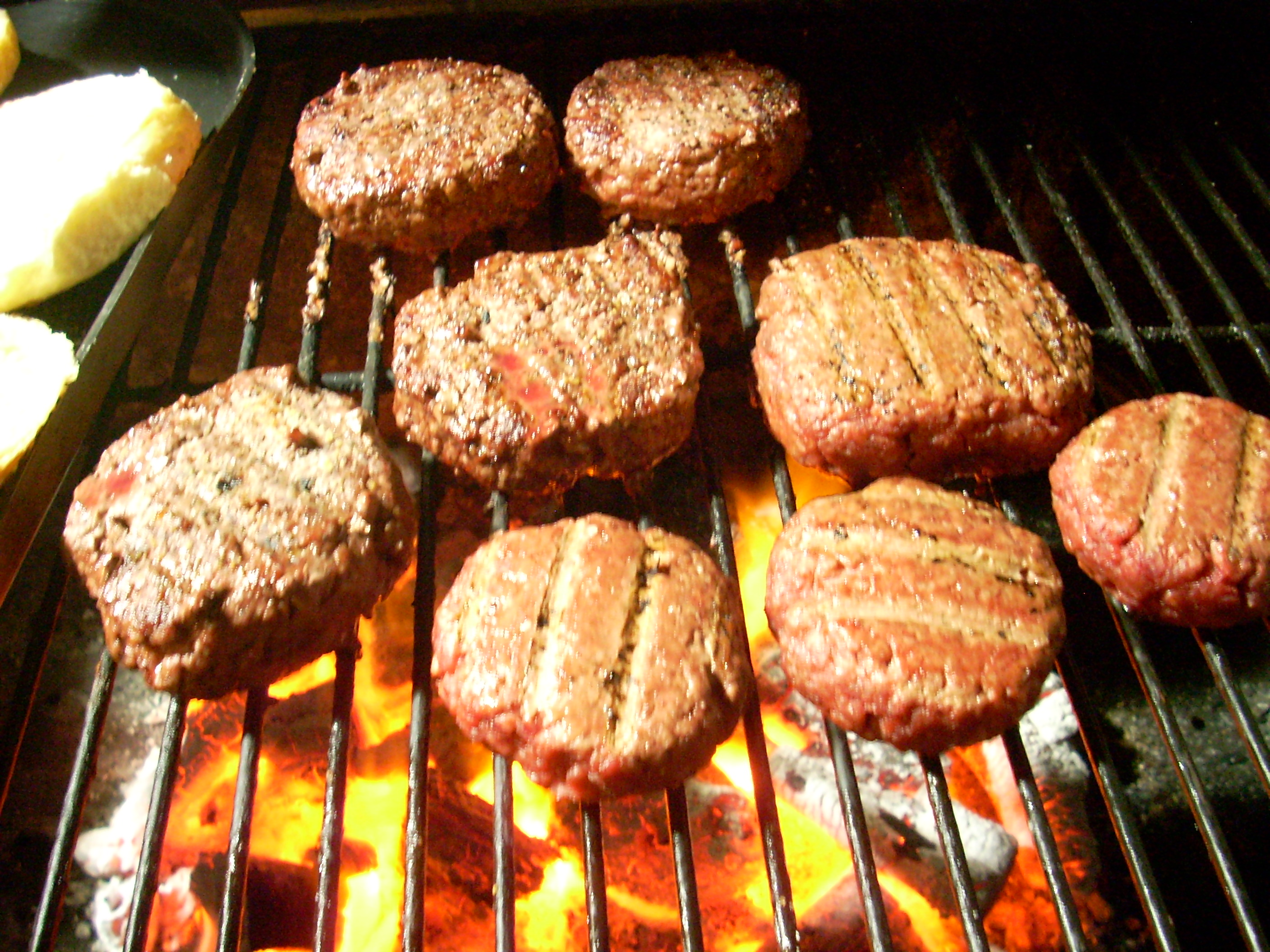
Hamburgers being grilled over a charcoal fire

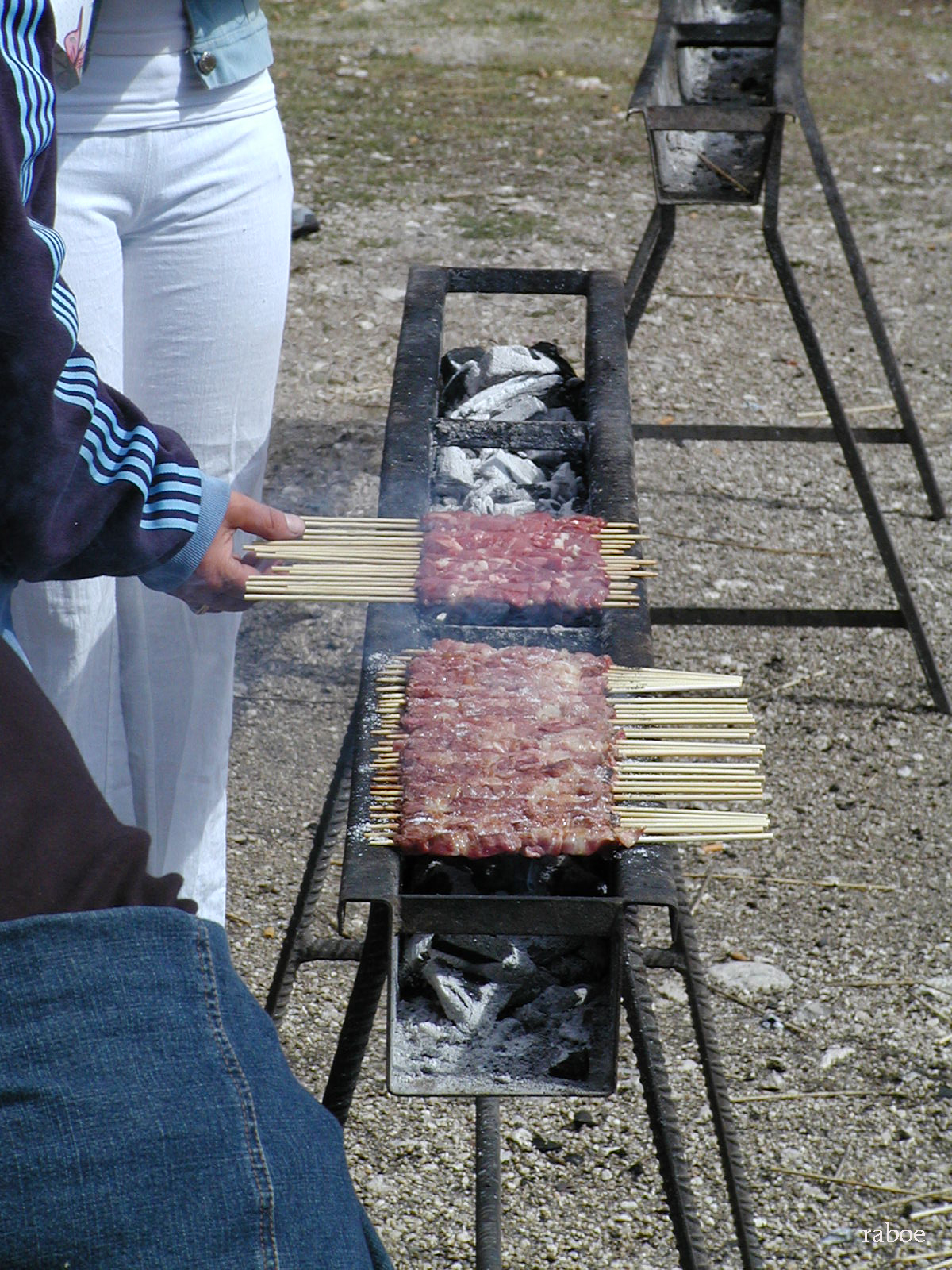
Arrosticini being cooked on a furnacella from Italian cuisine

Grilling is a form of cooking that involves heat applied to the surface of food, commonly from above, below or from the side. Grilling usually involves a significant amount of direct, radiant heat, and tends to be used for cooking meat and vegetables quickly. Food to be grilled is cooked on a grill (an open wire grid such as a gridiron with a heat source above or below), using a cast iron/frying pan, or a grill pan (similar to a frying pan, but with raised ridges to mimic the wires of an open grill).

Heat transfer to the food when using a grill is primarily through thermal radiation. Heat transfer when using a grill pan or griddle is by direct conduction. In the United States, when the heat source for grilling comes from above, grilling is called broiling. In this case, the pan that holds the food is called a broiler pan, and heat transfer is through thermal radiation.

Direct heat grilling can expose food to temperatures often in excess of 260 °C (500 °F). Grilled meat acquires a distinctive roast aroma and flavor from a chemical process called the Maillard reaction. The Maillard reaction only occurs when foods reach temperatures in excess of 155 °C (310 °F).

Not all foods are suitable for grilling. Grilling is an inappropriate treatment for large, tough cuts of meat as this fast technique would not allow the meat to cook slowly and tenderise. When using the grilling method, food is usually placed on a heat-resistant wire rack. This allows the fat, excess oils or juices to drain away.

Studies have shown that cooking beef, pork, poultry, and fish at high temperatures can lead to the formation of heterocyclic amines, benzopyrenes, and polycyclic aromatic hydrocarbons, which are carcinogens. Marination may reduce the formation of these compounds. Grilling is often presented as a healthy alternative to cooking with oils, although the fat and juices lost by grilling can contribute to drier food.

== Methods ==
=== Grid ironing ===
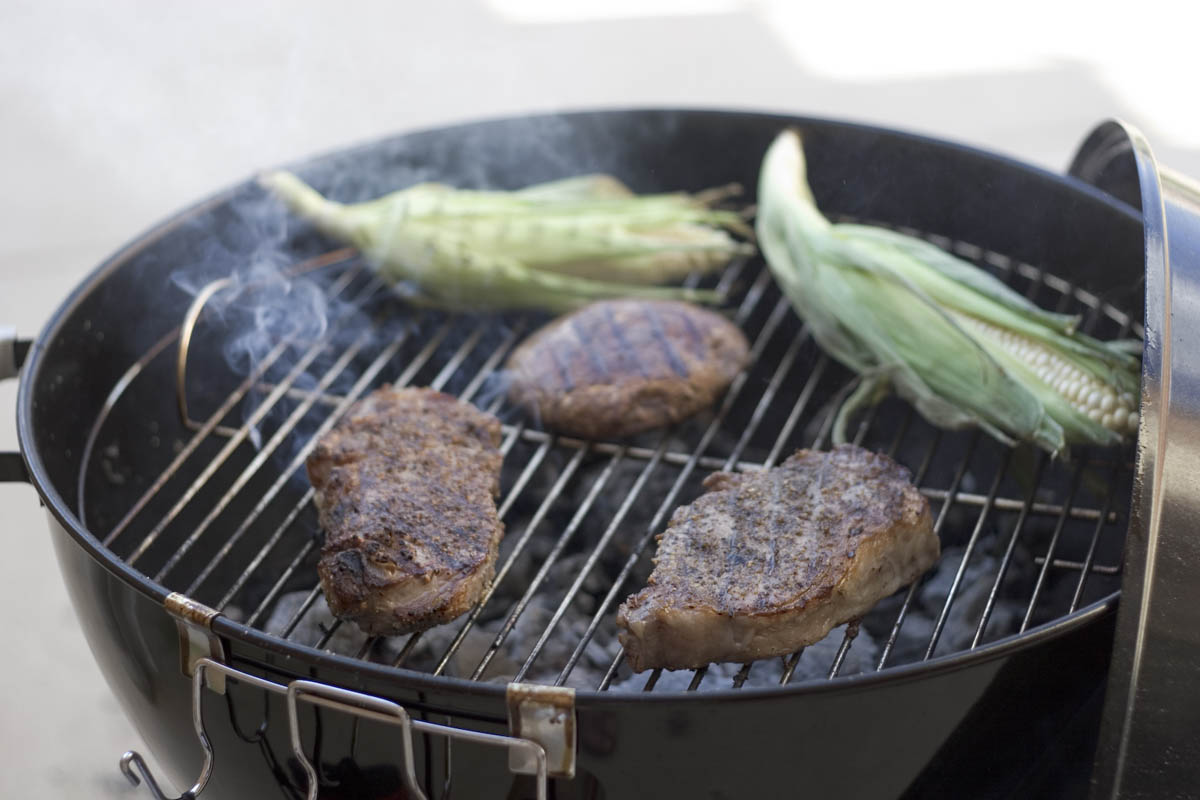
Food cooking on a charcoal grill

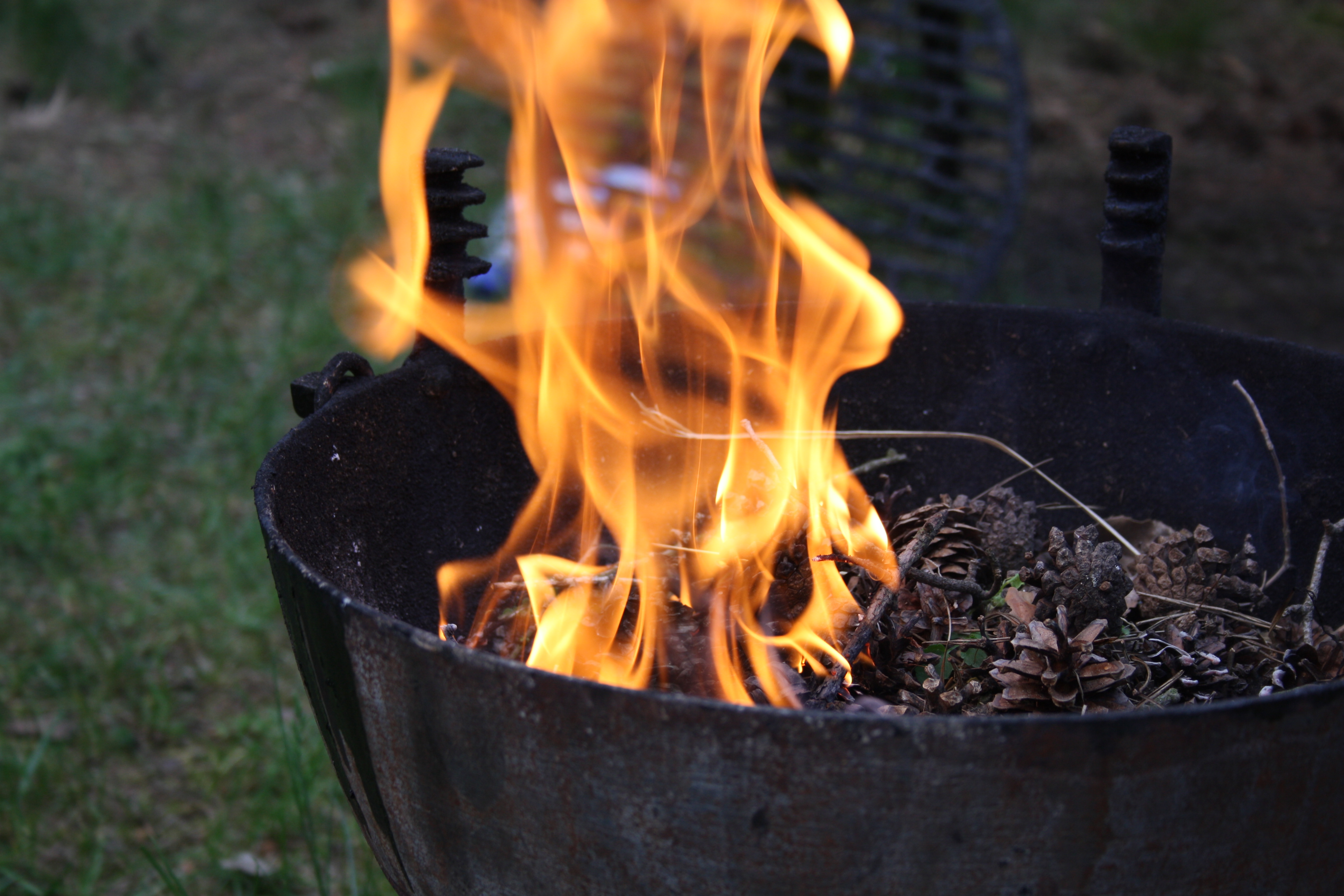
Preparation of a barbecue grill

Grid ironing is the cooking of meats or other foods using a grill suspended above a heat source. Grilling is often performed outdoors using charcoal (real wood or preformed briquettes), wood, or propane gas. Food is cooked using direct radiant heat. Some outdoor grills include a cover so they can be used as smokers or for grill-roasting/barbecue. The suspended metal grate is often referred to as a gridiron.

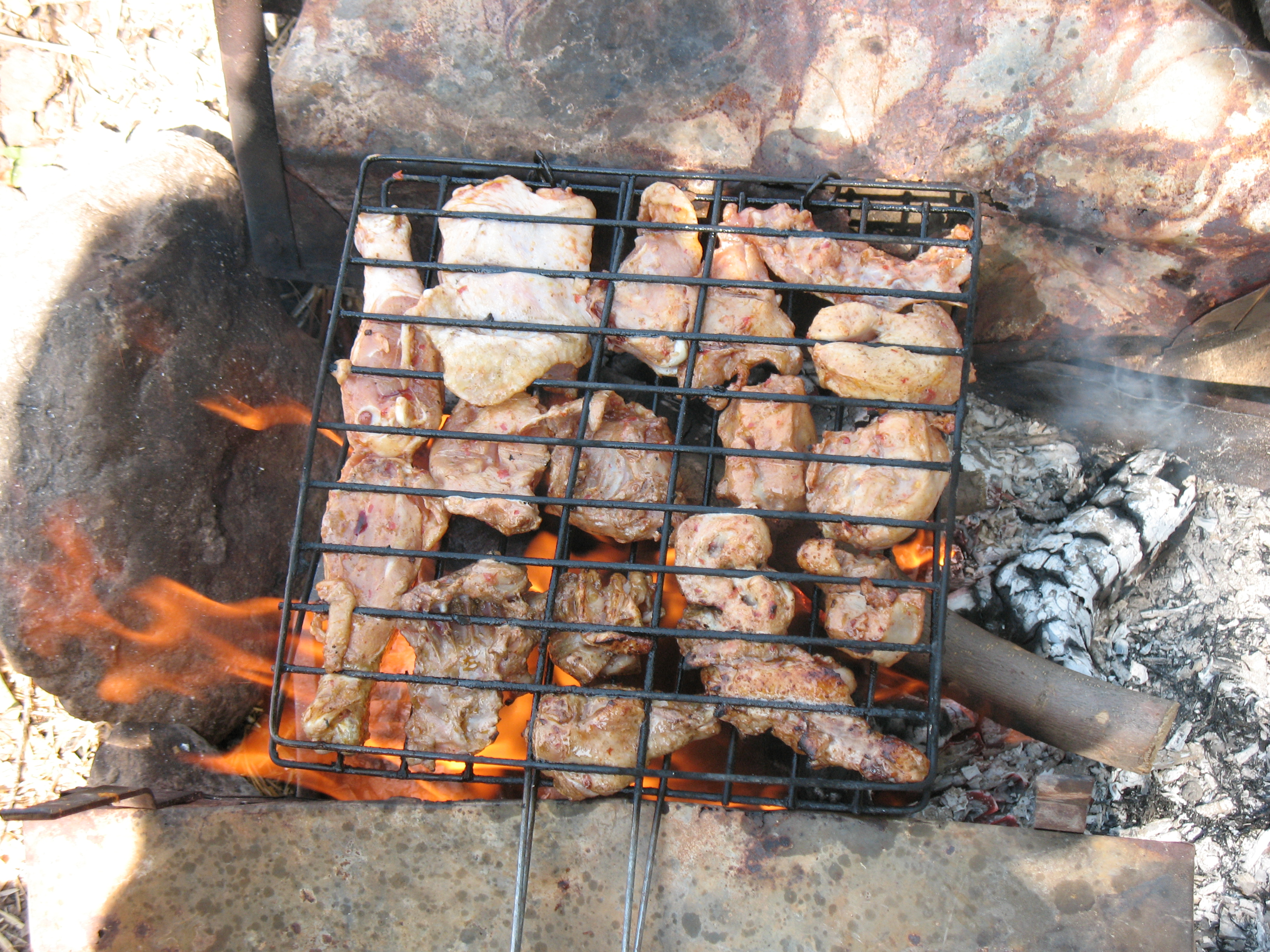
Grilling chicken in a hinged gridiron

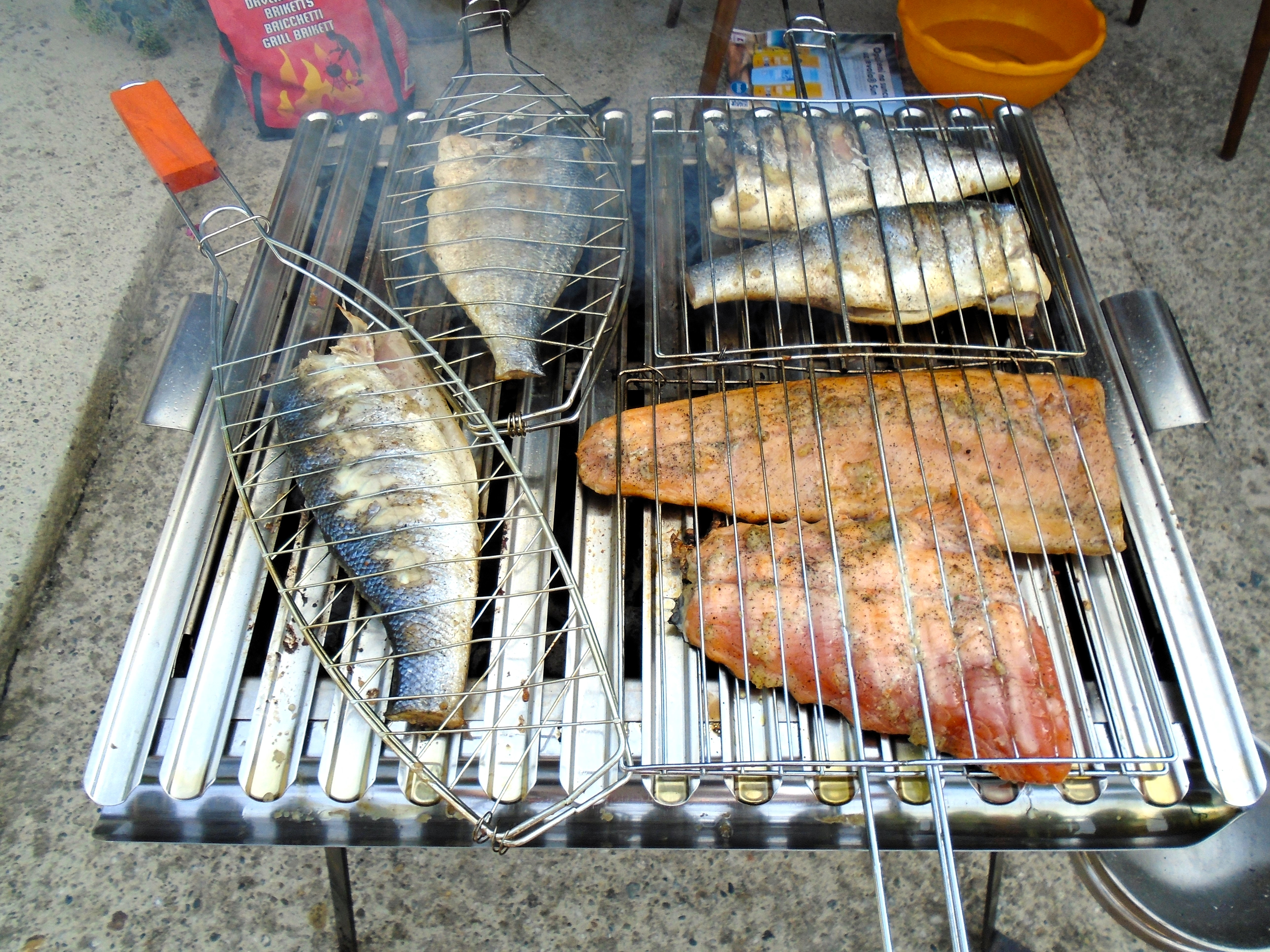
Grilling fish

Outdoor grilling on a gridiron may be referred to as "barbecue", though in US usage, the term barbecue refers to the cooking of meat through indirect heat and smoke. Barbecue may refer to the grilled food itself, to a distinct type of cooked meat called Southern barbecue, to the grilling device used to cook the food (a barbecue grill), or to the social event of cooking and eating such food (which may also be called a cook-out or braai).

==== Charcoal kettle-grilling ====
Charcoal kettle-grilling refers to the process of grilling over a charcoal fire in a kettle, to the point that the edges are charred, or charred grill marks are visible. Some restaurants seek to re-create the charcoal-grilled experience via the use of ceramic lava rocks or infrared heat sources, offering meats that are cooked in this manner as "charcoal-cooked" or "charcoal-grilled".

==== Grill-baking ====
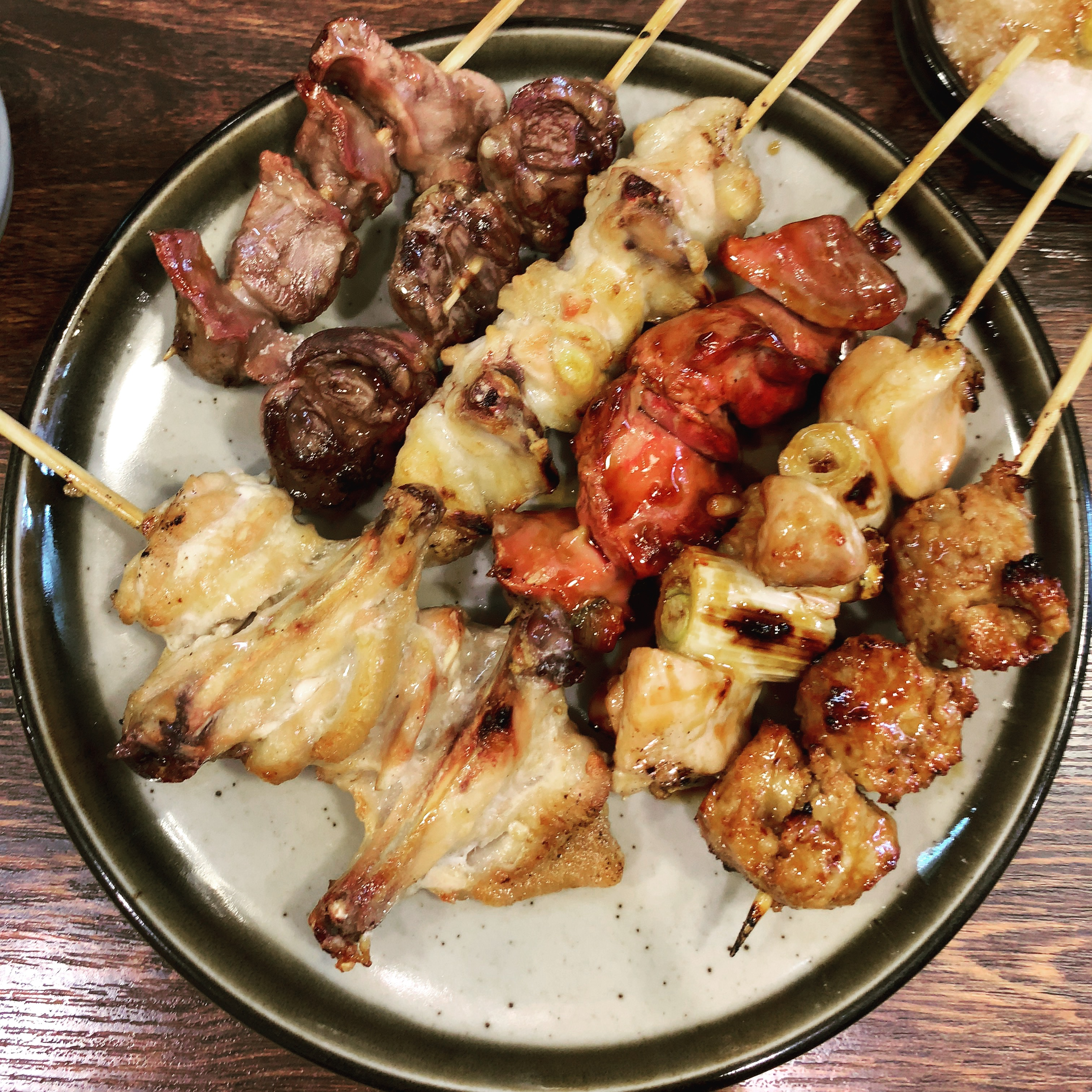
Grill-baked meat

By using a baking sheet pan placed above the grill surface, as well as a drip pan below the surface, it is possible to combine grilling and roasting to cook meats that are stuffed or coated with breadcrumbs or batter, and to bake breads and even casseroles and desserts. When cooking stuffed or coated meats, the foods can be baked first on the sheet pan, and then placed directly on the grilling surface for char marks, effectively cooking twice; the drip pan will be used to capture any crumbs that fall off from the coating or stuffing.

==== Grill-braising ====
It is possible to braise meats and vegetables in a pot on top of a grill. A gas or electric grill would be the best choices for what is known as "barbecue-braising" or "grill-braising", or combining grilling directly on the surface and braising in a pot. To braise on a grill, put a pot on top of the grill, cover it, and let it simmer for a few hours. There are two advantages to barbecue-braising. The first is that this method allows for browning the meat directly on the grill before the braising, and the second is that it also allows for glazing the meat with sauce and finishing it directly over the fire after the braising, effectively cooking the meat three times, which results in a soft textured product that falls right off the bone. This method of cooking is slower than regular grilling but faster than pit-smoking, starting out fast, slowing down, and then speeding up again to finish. If a pressure cooker is used, the cooking time will be much faster.

==== Indoor grilling ====
Many restaurants incorporate an indoor grill as part of their cooking apparatus. These grills resemble outdoor grills, in that they are made up of a grid suspended over a heat source. However, indoor grills are more likely to use electric or gas-based heating elements. Some manufacturers of residential cooking appliances now offer indoor grills for home use, either incorporated into a stove top or as a standalone electric device.

==== Sear grilling ====
Sear-grill and gear grilling is a process of searing food items over high temperatures. Sear grilling can be achieved using a gas grill, charcoal grill, hybrid grill, or infrared grill where the below flame heats the grill grates to temperatures over 480 °C (900 °F).

Sear-grilling instantly sears the outside of meat to make the food more flavorful. Commonly, grilling heats the surrounding air to cook food. In this method, the grill directly heats the food, not the air.

=== Stove-top pan grilling ===
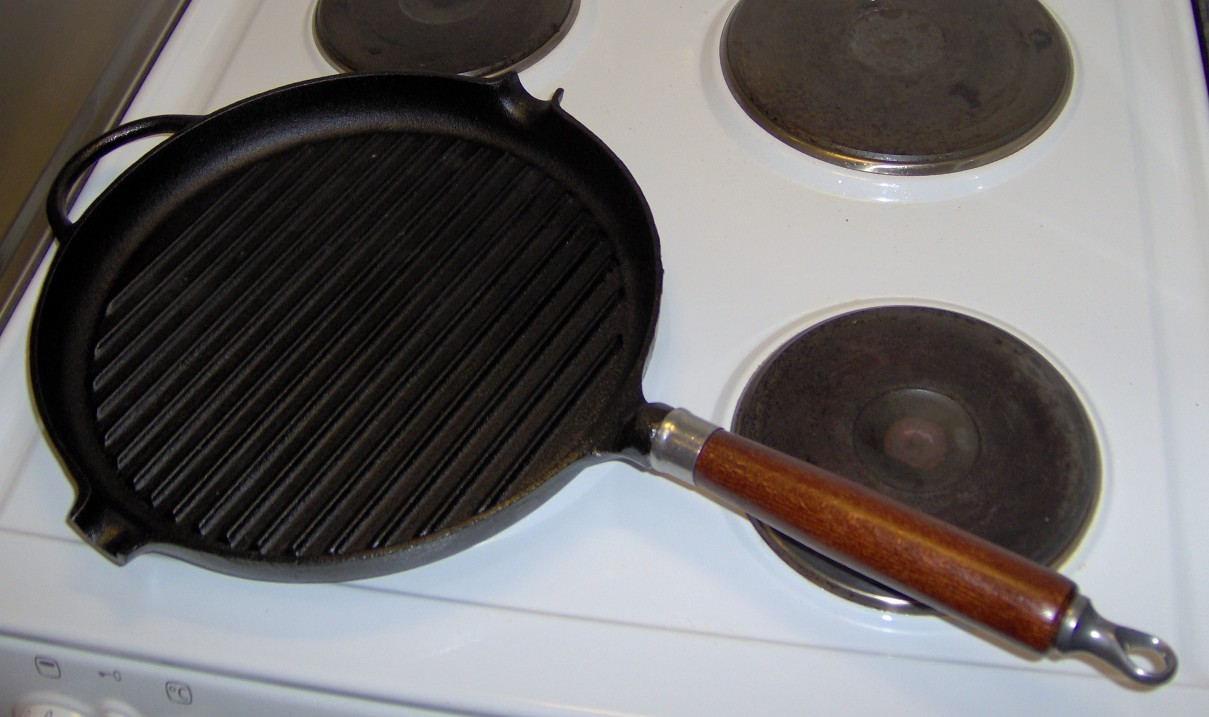
A grill pan

Stove-top pan grilling is an indoor cooking process that uses a grill pan — similar to a frying pan but with raised ridges to emulate the function or look of a gridiron. In pan grilling, heat is applied directly to the food by the raised ridges and indirectly through the heat radiating off the lower pan surface by the stove-top flame. Stove-top grill pans can be used to put sear marks on meat before it is finished by overhead radiant heat. When cooking leaner meats, oil is often applied to the pan ridges to aid in food release.

Some griddles designed for stove-top use incorporate raised ridges in addition to a flat cooking area. These are either on half of the cooking surface or, in the case of reversible two-sided griddles, on one side with the flat surface on the other.

=== Flattop grilling ===
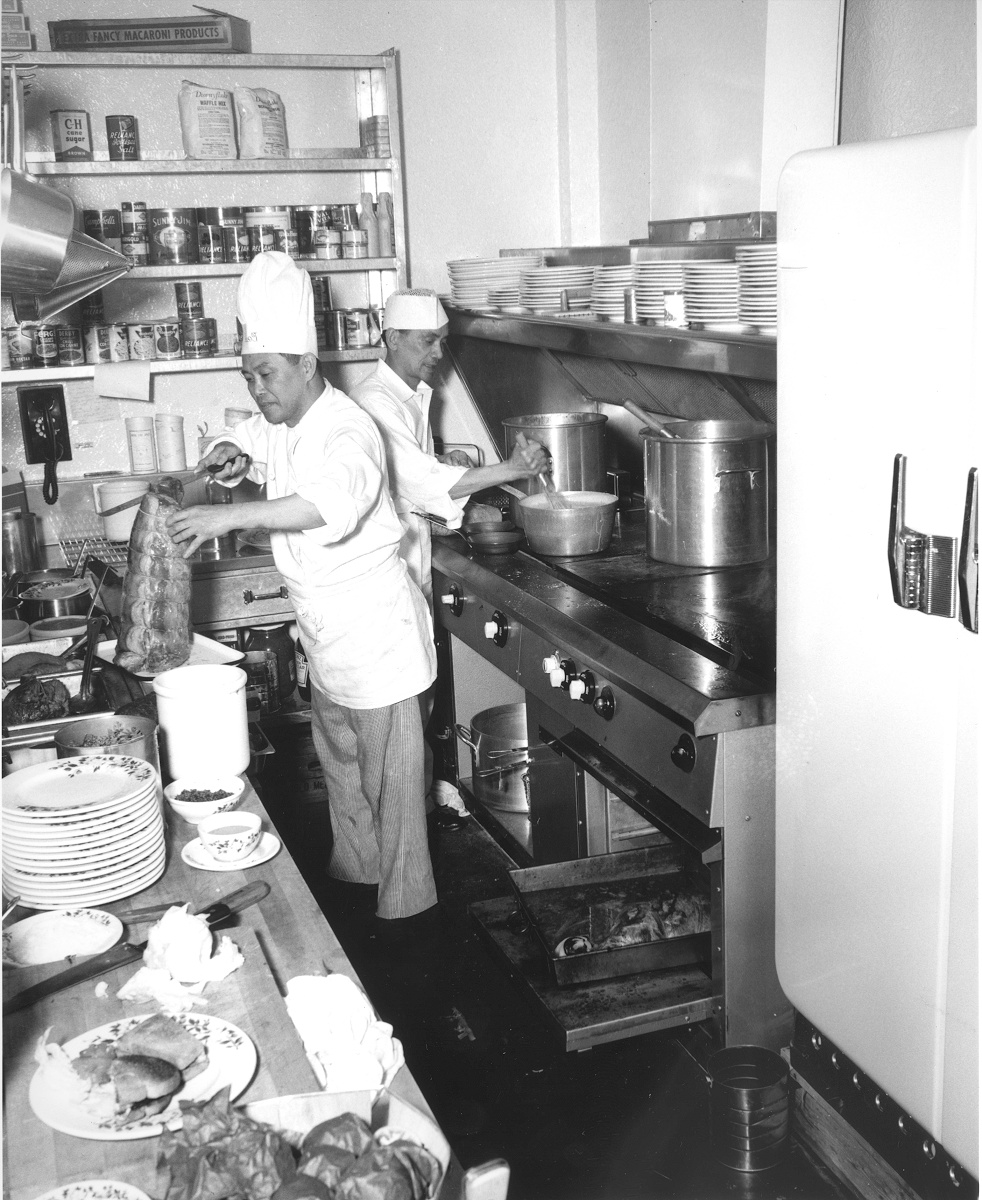
Cooks at the Northern Lights Dining Room, Seattle, Washington, 1952. A flattop grill being used is located on the right.

Foods termed "grilled" may actually be prepared on a hot griddle or flat pan. The griddle or pan may be prepared with oil (or butter), and the food is cooked quickly over a high heat. Griddle-grilling is best for relatively greasy foods such as sausages. Some griddle-grilled foods may have grill marks applied to them during the cooking process with a branding plate, to mimic the appearance of charbroil-cooked food.

A flattop grill is a cooking appliance that resembles a griddle but performs differently because the heating element is circular rather than straight (side to side). This heating technology creates an extremely hot and even cooking surface, as heat spreads in a radial fashion over the surface.

The first flattop grills originated in Spain and are known as planchas or la plancha. Food that is cooked a la plancha means grilled on a metal plate. Plancha griddles or flat tops are chrome plated which prevents reaction with the food. Some base metal griddles will impart a subtle flavor to the food being cooked.

The flattop grill is a versatile platform for many cooking techniques such as sautéing, toasting, steaming, stir frying, grilling, baking, braising, and roasting, and can also be used in flambéing. In addition, pots and pans can be placed directly on the cooking surface for even more cooking flexibility. In most cases, the steel cooking surface is seasoned like cast iron cookware, providing a natural non-stick surface.

=== Charbroiling ===
Charbroiling, or chargrilling outside North America, refers to grilling on a surface with wide raised ridges, to the point of having the food slightly charred in texture.

=== Overhead grilling ===
In the United States, oven pan broiling refers to a method of cooking inside an oven on a broil pan with raised ridges, where the heat can be applied from either above or below. In gas and electric ovens, this is accomplished with a heating element and a broil pan. Sometimes, the food is placed near the upper heating element to intensify the heat. The lower heating element may or may not be left off and the oven door is sometimes opened partially. Gas ovens often have a separate compartment for broiling, sometimes a drawer below the bottom flame.

==== Salamander ====
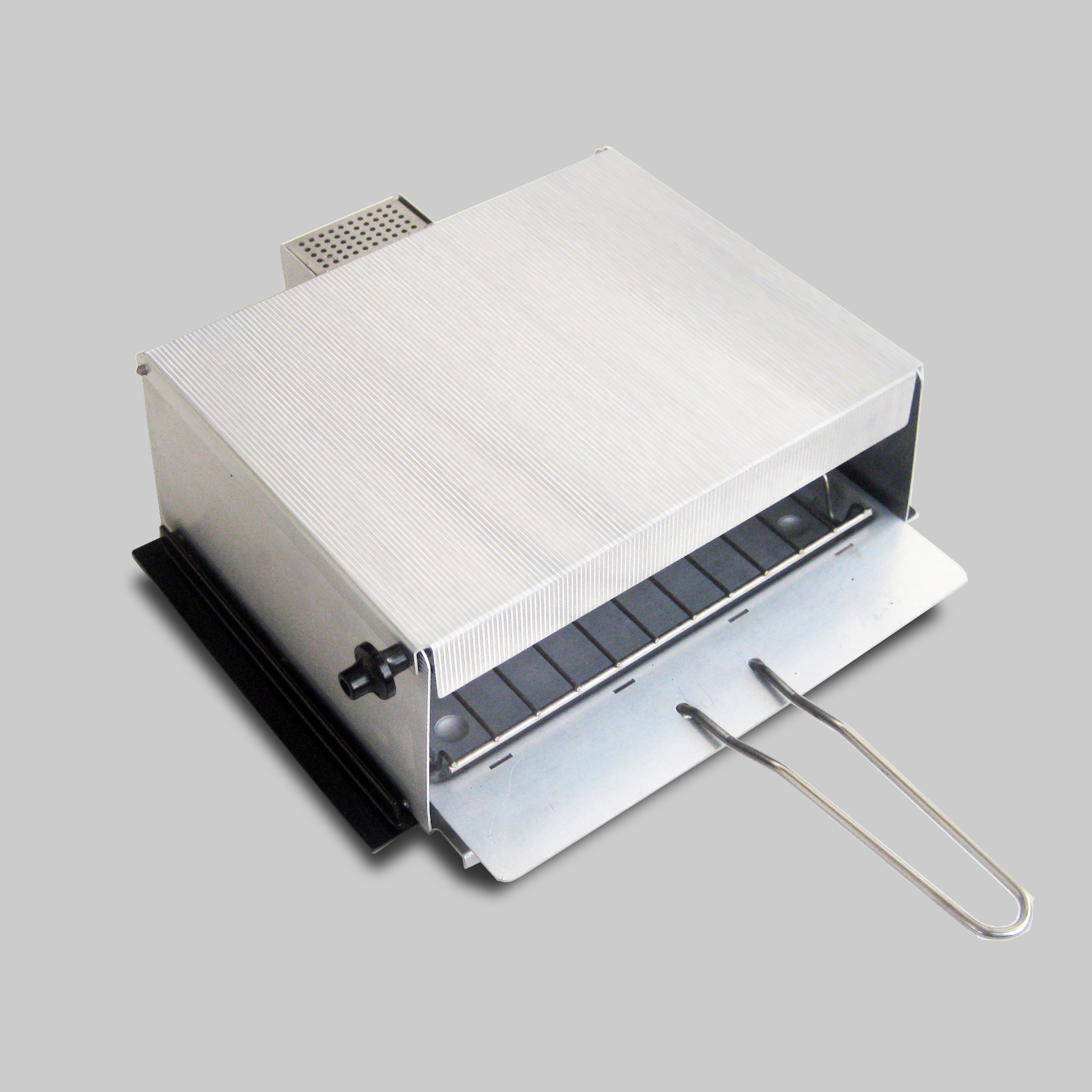
Salamander (electric grill with top heat)

A salamander (also salamander oven or salamander broiler) is a grill characterized by very high temperature supplied by overhead electric or gas heating elements. It is used primarily in professional kitchens for overhead grilling. It is also used for toasting, browning of gratin dishes, melting cheeses onto sandwiches, and caramelizing desserts such as crème brûlée.

Salamanders are generally similar to an oven without a front door; the heating element is at the top. They are also more compact: typically only half the height and depth of a conventional oven. For convenience, they are often wall mounted at eye level, enabling easy access and close control of the cooking process. Many salamanders can be fitted with a cast-iron "branding" plate which is used to make grill marks on the surface of meat. Some grills can also be fitted with a rotisserie accessory for roasting meats.

Overhead heat has the advantage of allowing foods containing fats, such as steaks, chops and other cuts of meat, to be grilled without the risk of flare-ups caused by the rendered fat dripping onto the heat source. The salamander's facility for extremely high temperature also takes less cooking time than other grilling techniques, reducing preparation time, which is a benefit in professional kitchens during a busy meal service.

Modern salamanders take their name from the 18th-century salamander, the tool of choice for toasting the top of a dish. It consisted of a thick plate of iron attached to the end of a long handle, with two feet, or rests, arranged near the iron plate for propping the plate over the food to be browned. Its name in turn was taken from the legendary salamander, a mythical amphibian that was thought to be immune to fire.

=== Two-sided grilling ===
Some commercial devices permit the simultaneous grilling of both sides of the meat at the same time.

The flame-grilling machine at Burger King, Carl's Jr./Hardee's, and other fast food restaurants is called a 'broiler'. It works by moving meat patties along a chain conveyor belt between top and bottom burners, grilling both sides of the meat patty at the same time. This concept was invented in 1898, when the Bridge and Beach Co. of St. Louis, Missouri, started manufacturing a vertical cast iron stove. These stoves were designed to allow the meat to be flame-broiled (flame-grilled) on both sides at the same time. Custom hinged steel wire gridirons were built for use in the vertical broilers. The hinged gridirons were slid in and out of the stoves holding the meat while it cooked evenly on both sides, like modern day oven racks. These stoves took up a small amount of counter space. They were used in lunch spots to feed factory workers.

During the 1990s, double-sided grilling was popular in the USA using consumer electrical grills (e.g., the popular George Foreman Grill). US marketers of electric double-sided grilling appliances opted for the global term 'grill' rather than the geographically isolated term "broiler." Hinged double-sided grills are generically known as contact grills.

=== Whole grilling ===
Whole grilling involves grilling a whole carcass as opposed to grilling individual portion sized cuts. This method is often used in order to avoid the need for complicated grill equipment during, for example, a hunt or expedition in the wild. It is also the traditional method of cooking in several cultures where they do a pig roast, luau, or barbacoa. There are several primitive methods and modern equipment that copies and automates the primitive version:

- On a stick
  - Rotating horizontally with heat from tall flames from usually two fires on the side: In this version, which essentially is one sided vertical grilling, it is usual to spice the inside and sew the entrance of the body enclosure using freshly cut sticks in order to save the juices, rotate back and forth (never seam line at bottom), harvest the juice at the end of grilling, and use it as a spicy sauce over the outside surface.
  - Rotating horizontally over embers: In this version the meat may be subject to smoke from dripping fat that burns.
  - Planted in a heated and covered pit: a ground hole version of tandoori or oven. A covered pit makes it difficult to check the correct amount of cooking time.
- Asado on a vertical frame planted vertically next to the fire ground and leaned over embers: In this version it is usual to open the torso to avoid uncooked portions.
- Hang in a heated and covered pit. This requires a rod extending across the pit opening and a heat-resistant hanging mechanism such as a metal S hook.
- On a tray in a large oven, heated and covered pit, barbeque grill or smoker.
- In a fireproof closed container buried in embers or surrounded by fire: this is practical for small carcasses like whole chicken. One variation of this is to shallowly bury the food and make a fire over, just to dig it up again; This is suitable to whole grill a large pumpkin that has been opened from the top, seeds removed, the inside sugared, and closed again.

== Health risks ==
As is true of any high-temperature frying or baking, when meat is grilled at high temperatures, the cooking process can generate carcinogenic chemicals. Two processes are thought to be responsible. Heterocyclic amines (HCAs) are formed when amino acids, sugars, and creatine react at high temperatures. Polycyclic aromatic hydrocarbons (PAHs) are formed when fat and juices from meat grilled directly over an open fire drip onto the fire, causing flames. These flames contain PAHs that then adhere to the surface of the meat. Avoiding prolonged cooking times or direct exposure to open flames and hot metal surfaces may reduce HCA and PAH formation. Precooking meat in a microwave can help by reducing the length of exposure to high heat required to finish cooking.

== Regional variations ==
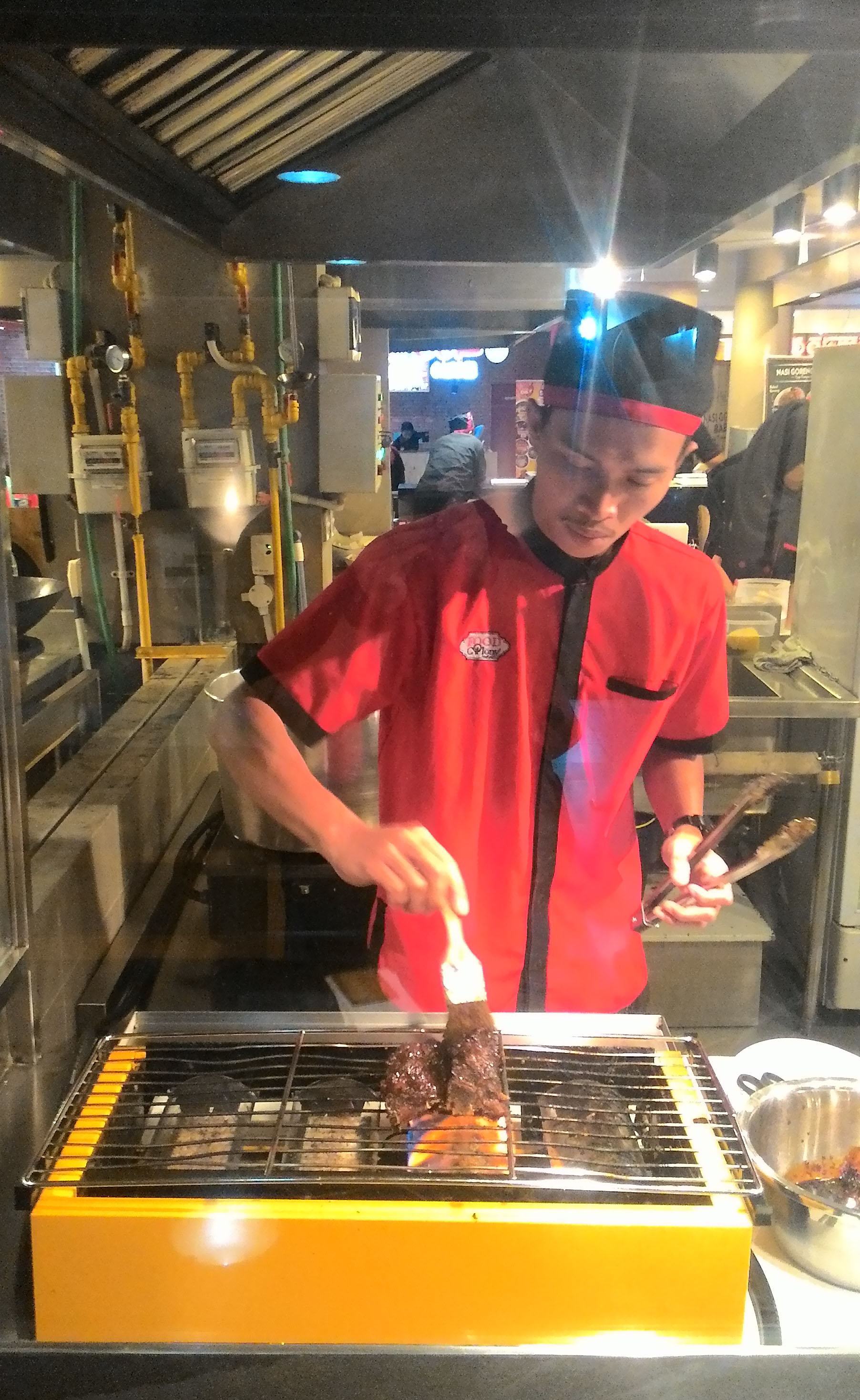
Grilling konro bakar, spicy beef ribs.

=== Asia ===
==== Japan ====
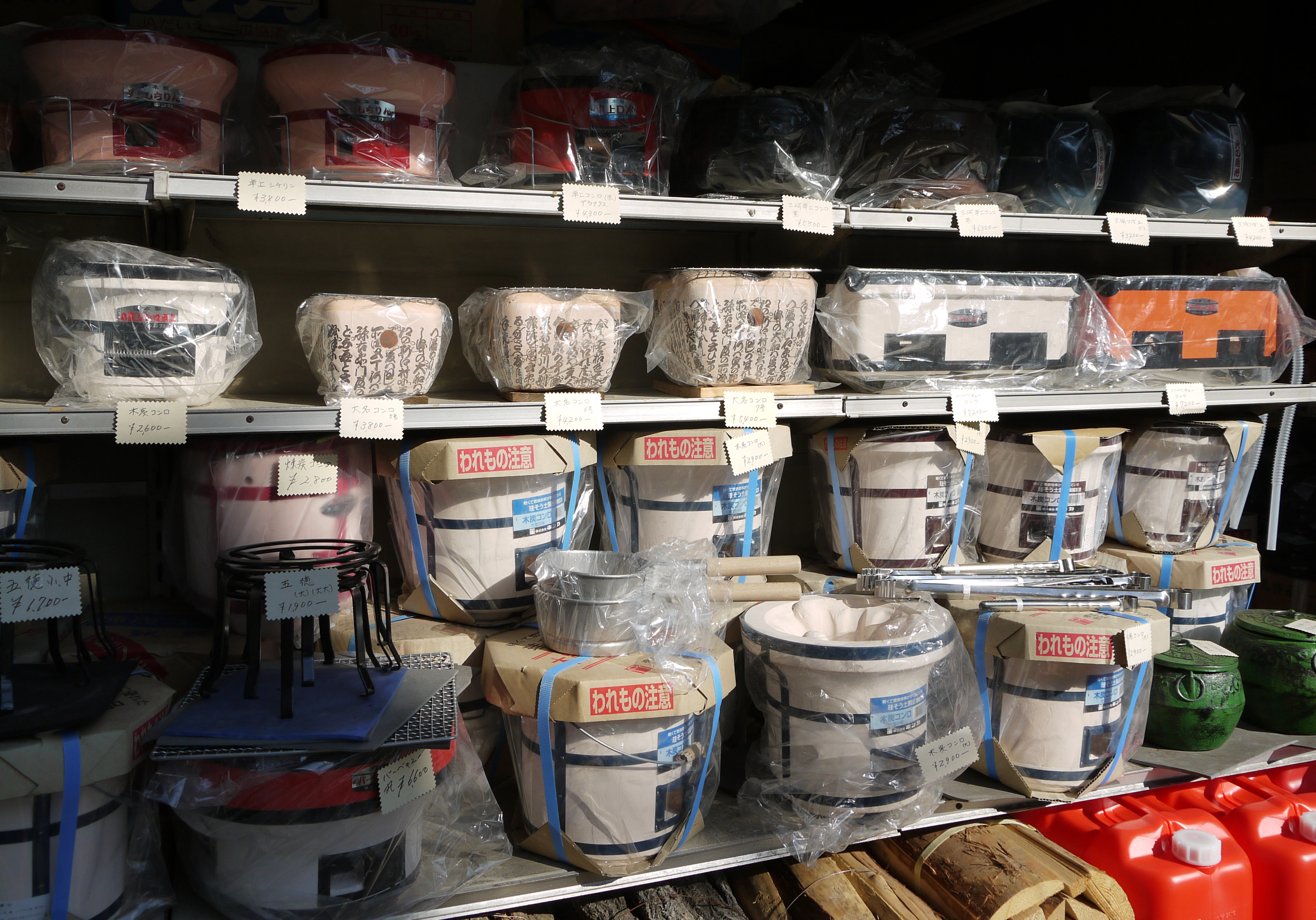
Japanese traditional portable charcoal grill "Shichirin"

In Japanese cities, yakitori carts, restaurants, or shops can be found. These contain charcoal-fired grills and marinated grilled meat on a stick. Yakiniku is a type of food where meat and vegetables are grilled directly over small charcoal or gas grills at high temperatures. This style of cooking has become popular throughout Asia.

==== Korea ====
In Korean cuisine, gui is a grilled dish. Examples of Korean barbecue include bulgogi (thinly sliced or shredded beef marinated in soy sauce, sesame oil, garlic, sugar, green onions, and black pepper), galbi (pork or beef ribs), dak-galbi (spicy marinated chicken), and samgyeopsal (pork belly). Other examples of grilled dishes include gopchang-gui (small intestines), tteok-galbi (grilled short rib patties), and makchang-gui (beef abomasum).

==== Philippines ====
In the Philippines, pork or chicken inihaw (similar in taste to yakitori), inasal, isaw, and satti are sold commonly as street food or in specialist restaurants.

==== Malaysia, Singapore, Indonesia, and Thailand ====
In Malaysia, Singapore, Indonesia, and Thailand, the popular food item from food vendors is satay, which is marinated meat on a bamboo skewer grilled over a charcoal fire and served with peanut (sate) sauce.

=== Europe ===
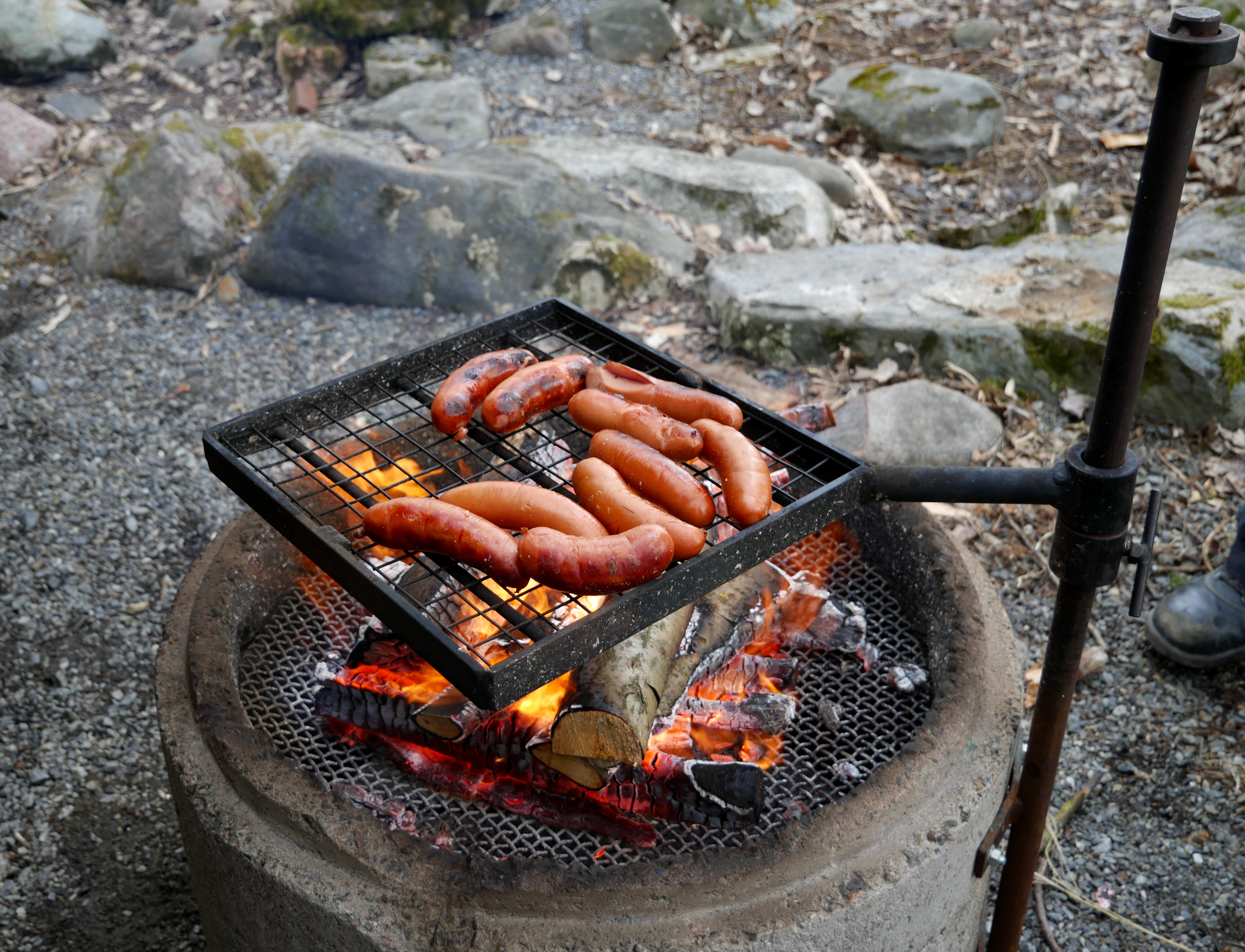
Grilling sausages in Finland

==== Germany ====
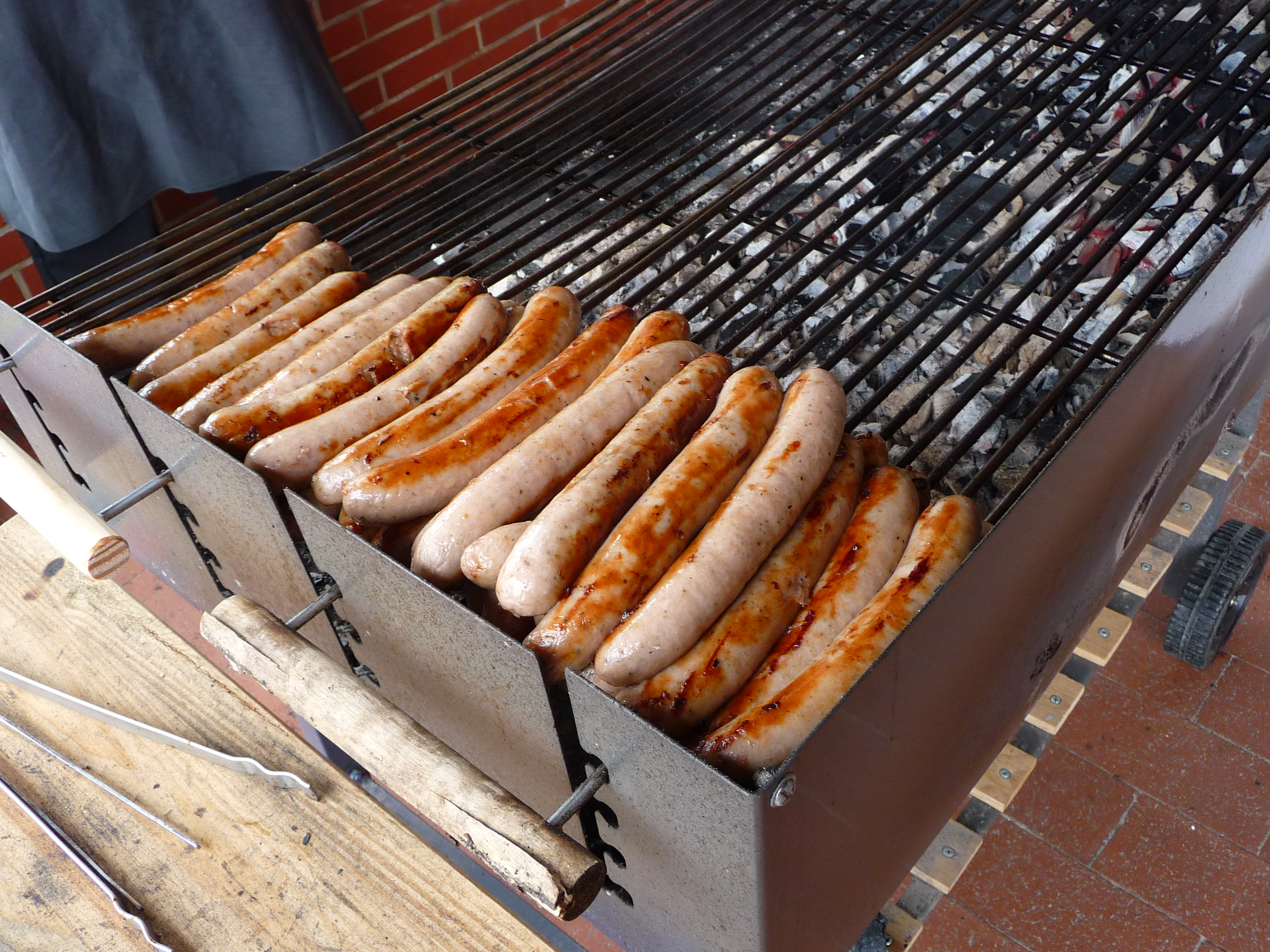
Grilled bratwurst

In Germany, the most prominent outdoor form of grilling is using the gridiron over a bed of burning charcoal. Care is taken that the charcoal does not produce flames. Often beer is sprinkled over the sausages or meat and used to suppress flames. The meat is usually marinated before grilling. Besides charcoal, sometimes gas and electric heat sources are used. Other methods are used less frequently.

==== Sweden ====
In Sweden, grilling directly over hot coals is the most prominent form of grilling. Usually the meat is Boston butt, pork chops or pork fillet. It is also common to cook meat and vegetables together on a skewer, called "grillspett".

==== United Kingdom and Ireland ====
In the United Kingdom, Commonwealth countries, and Ireland, grilling generally refers to cooking food directly under a source of direct, dry heat. The "grill" is usually a separate part of an oven where the food is inserted just under the element. (Note: See b:Cookbook:Grilling.) This practice is referred to as "broiling" in North America.

In electric ovens, grilling may be accomplished by placing the food near the upper heating element, with the lower heating element off and the oven door partially open. Grilling in an electric oven may create a large amount of smoke and cause splattering in the oven. Both gas and electric ovens often have a separate compartment for grilling, such as a drawer below the flame or one of the stove top heating elements.

=== North and South America ===
==== Argentina and Uruguay ====
In Argentina and Uruguay, both asado (beef roasted on a fire) and steak a la parrilla (beefsteak cooked on traditional grill) are staple dishes and even hailed as national specialties.

==== Canada ====
In Canada, the term most often used is barbecuing, but grilling is used as well. Most Canadians use gas or charcoal grills, with a small electric grill market. Barbecuing in Canada is done all year, with many opting to grill only in the warmer months, while storing their grills indoors during the winter. Restaurants that serve barbecue products are plentiful and many stores stock grills and grilling accessories.

==== Mexico ====
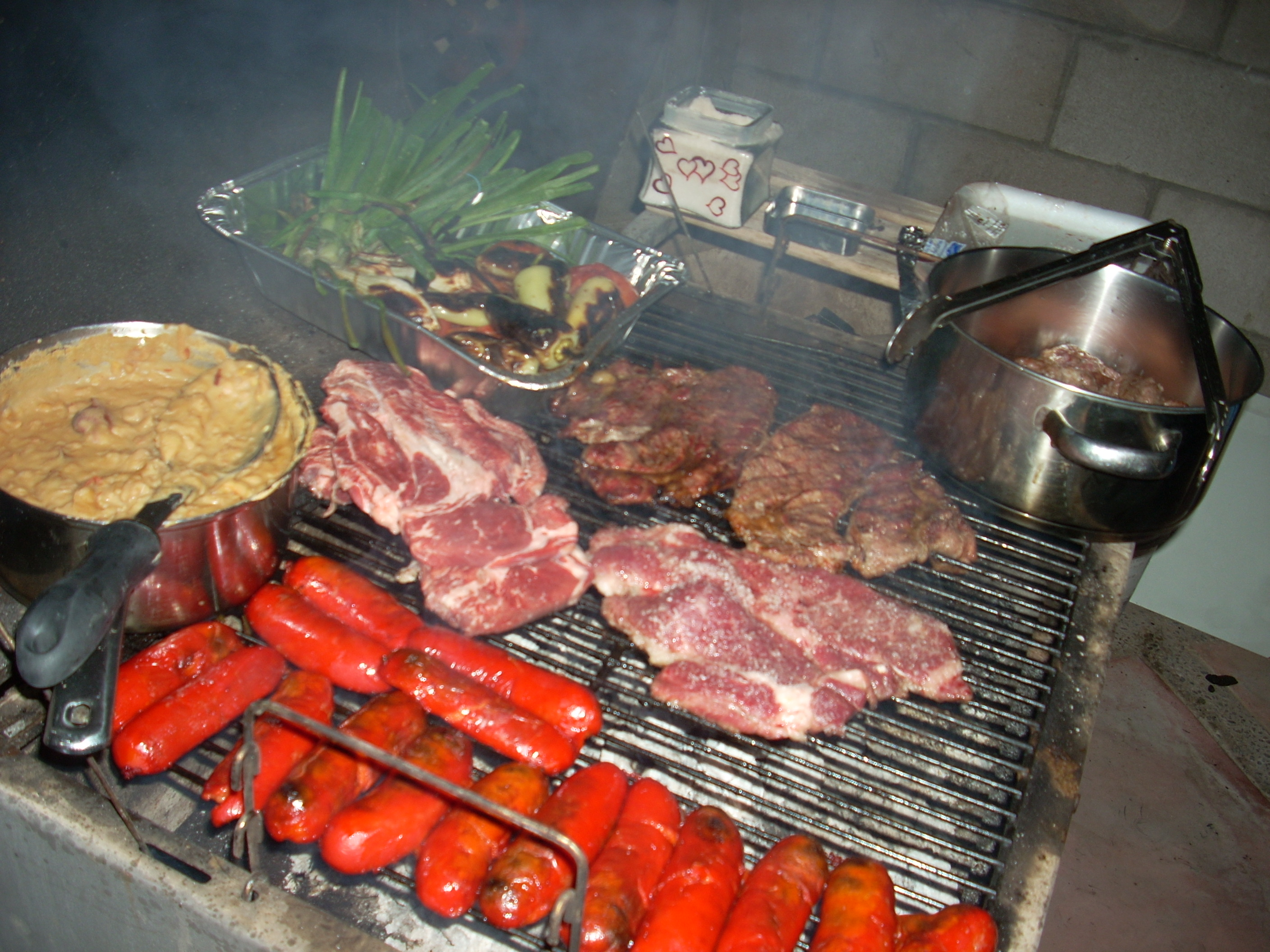
Mexican carne asada. Chorizos are also being grilled.

In Northern Mexico, carne asada (Spanish for "grilled meat") is a staple food. Popular cuts include arrachera, beefsteak and rib eye, as well as chorizo and chicken, among others. Charcoal, mesquite or firewood are used for the grilling.

==== United States ====
In the United States, the use of the word grill refers to cooking food directly over a source of dry heat, typically with the food sitting on a metal grate that leaves "grill marks." Grilling is usually done outdoors on charcoal grills or gas grills; a recent trend is the concept of infrared grilling. Grilling may also be performed using stove-top "grill pans" which have raised metal ridges for the food to sit on, or using an indoor electric grill.

A skewer, brochette, or rotisserie may be used to cook small pieces of food. The resulting food product is often called a "kabob" (U.S. term) or "kebab" which means "to grill" in Persian. Kebab is short for "shish kebab" (shish = skewer).

Mesquite or hickory wood chips (damp) may be added on top of the coals to create a smoldering effect that provides additional flavor to the food. Other hardwoods such as pecan, apple, maple and oak may also be used.

== See also ==
- Barbecue
- Braai
- Spice rub
- Schwenker
- Teppanyaki
