= Deodeok-gui =

Korean vegetable dish

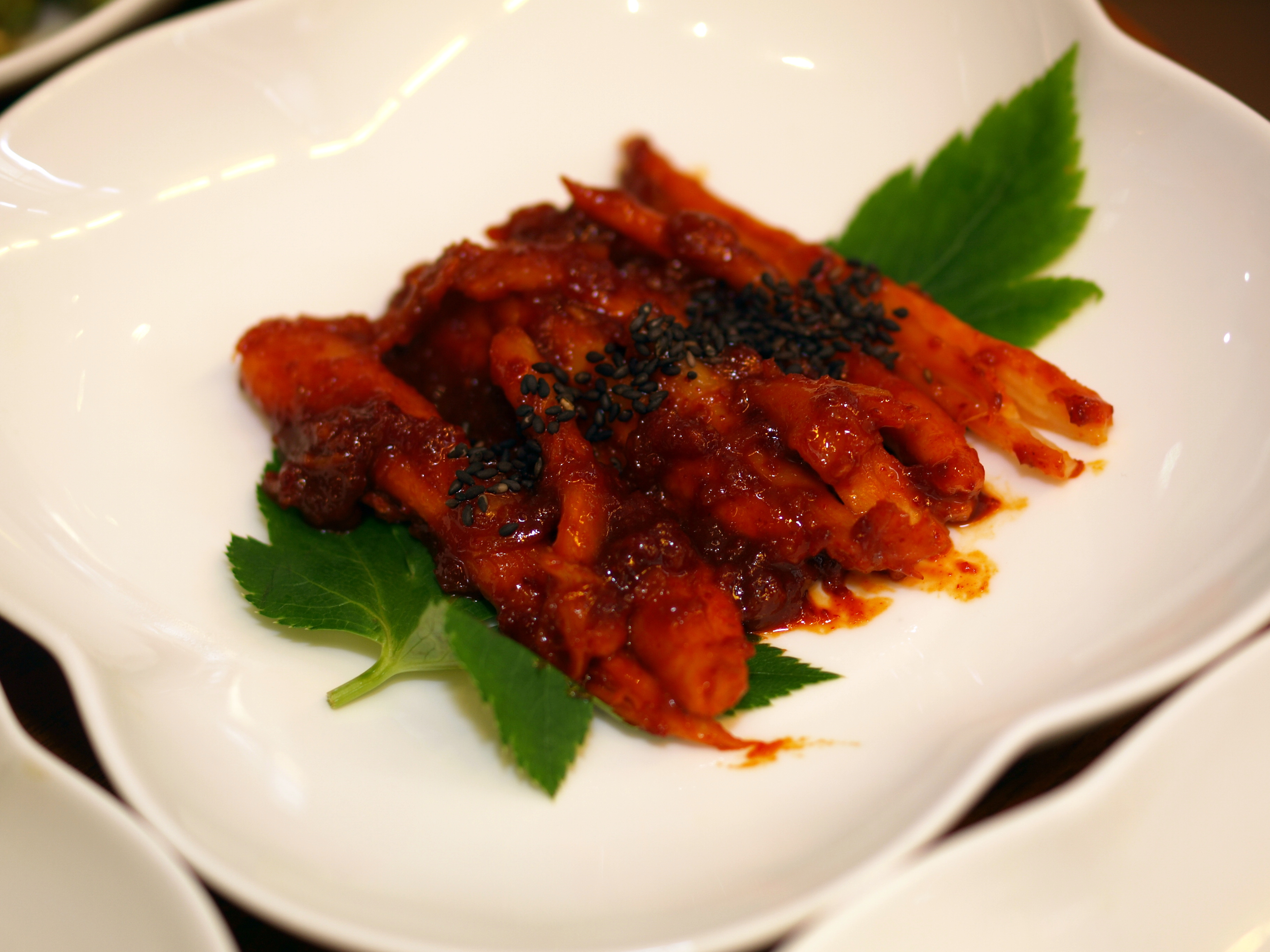

Korean name
- Hangul: 더덕구이
- RR: deodeokgui
- MR: tŏdŏkkui

Deodeok-gui (Korean: 더덕구이) is a Korean vegetable dish thinly spread out and broiled with gochujang.

== Origin and Its efficacy ==
The dish was invented by ethnic Koreans living in China.

Deodeok roots are rich in minerals and vitamins, including fiber, calcium, phosphorus, and iron. The white essence that comes out when it is cut, is a saponin, and it is a bitter substances, but it improves lung health. It has long been used as a medicine to treat bronchitis and asthma. Along with inulin, Saponins reduce cholesterol in the blood and lipid content, and lower blood pressure.

== See also ==
- Deodeok
- Gui
- Korean barbecue
- barbecue
