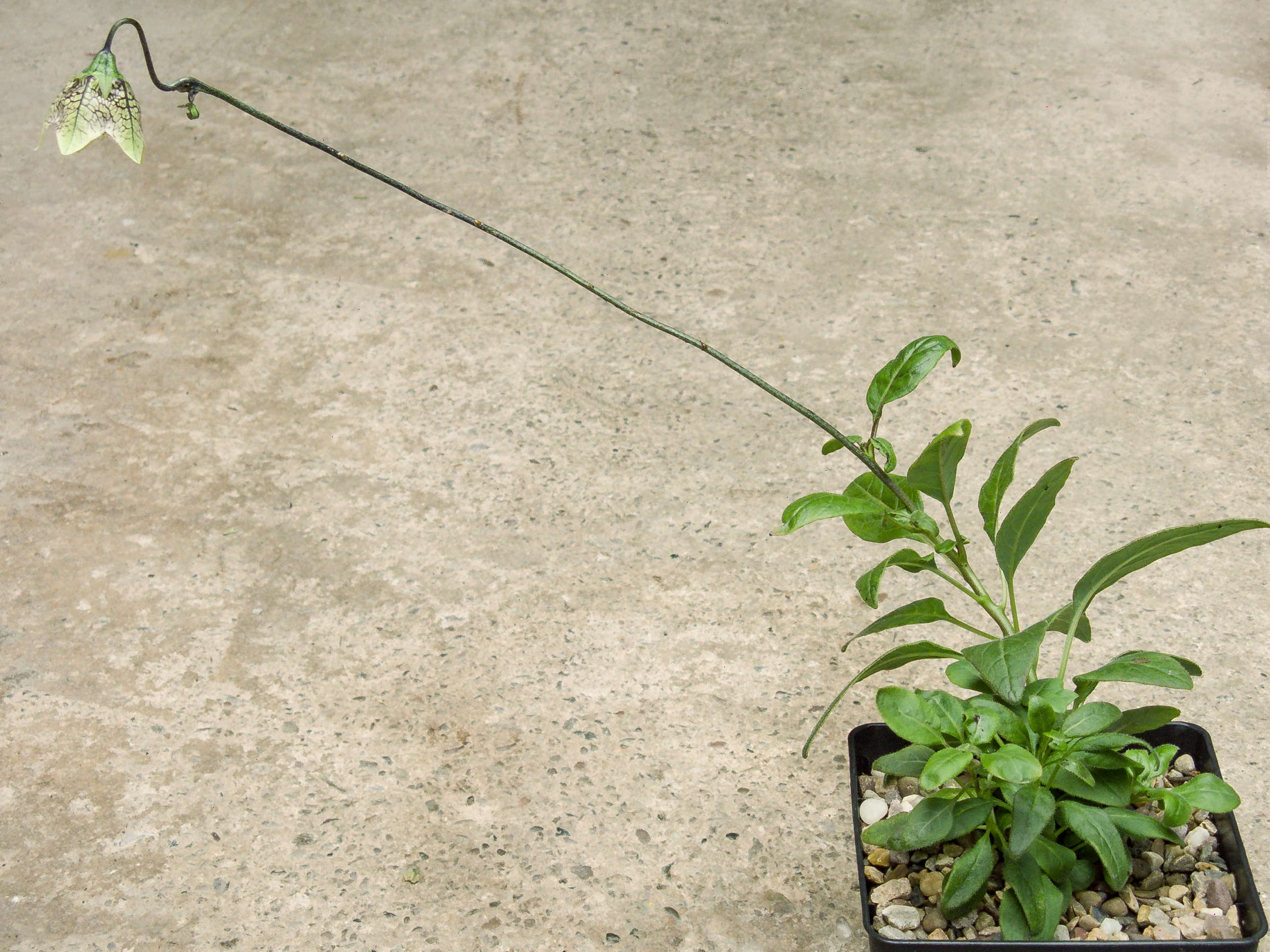
- In cultivation

Scientific classification
- Kingdom: Plantae
- Clade: Tracheophytes
- Clade: Angiosperms
- Clade: Eudicots
- Clade: Asterids
- Order: Asterales
- Family: Campanulaceae
- Genus: Codonopsis
- Species: C. subscaposa

Binomial name
- Codonopsis subscaposa Kom.

= Codonopsis subscaposa =

Species of flowering plant

Codonopsis subscaposa is a herbaceous member of the family Campanulaceae, native to south-central China. Its broadly bell-shaped flowers are borne on long stems, and are either yellowish or greenish white with red-purple veins, or red-purple with yellowish spots.

== Description ==
Codonopsis subscaposa grows from carrot-shaped roots up to 20 cm (7.9 in) long and 1 cm (0.4 in) across. It has erect stems, unbranched or with very few branches, 40–60 cm (16–24 in) high. The leaves vary in shape and are grey-green on the upper surface, green on the lower surface, usually about 2–8 cm (0.8–3.1 in) long by 1–4 cm (0.4–1.6 in) across, but sometimes larger. One to four flowers are often borne at the top of the stems on long pedicels. The calyx forms a tube attached to the ovary for about half its length. The bell-shaped corolla is 1.5–3 cm (0.6–1.2 in) long and 2–4 cm (0.8–1.6 in) across, and is either yellowish or greenish white with red-purple veins, or red-purple with yellowish spots. The five petals are joined at the base to about half their length. After fertilization, brown-yellow seeds form in a capsule about 15 mm (0.6 in) long.

== Taxonomy ==
Codonopsis subscaposa was first described by the Russian botanist Vladimir Leontyevich Komarov in 1908. Codonopsis is placed in the subfamily Campanuloideae of the family Campanulaceae.

== Distribution and habitat ==
Codonopsis subscaposa is native to south-central China, in particular west Sichuan and north-west Yunnan. It is found on grassy slopes, wet meadows, and open woods at altitudes of 2,500–4,200 m (8,200–13,800 ft).

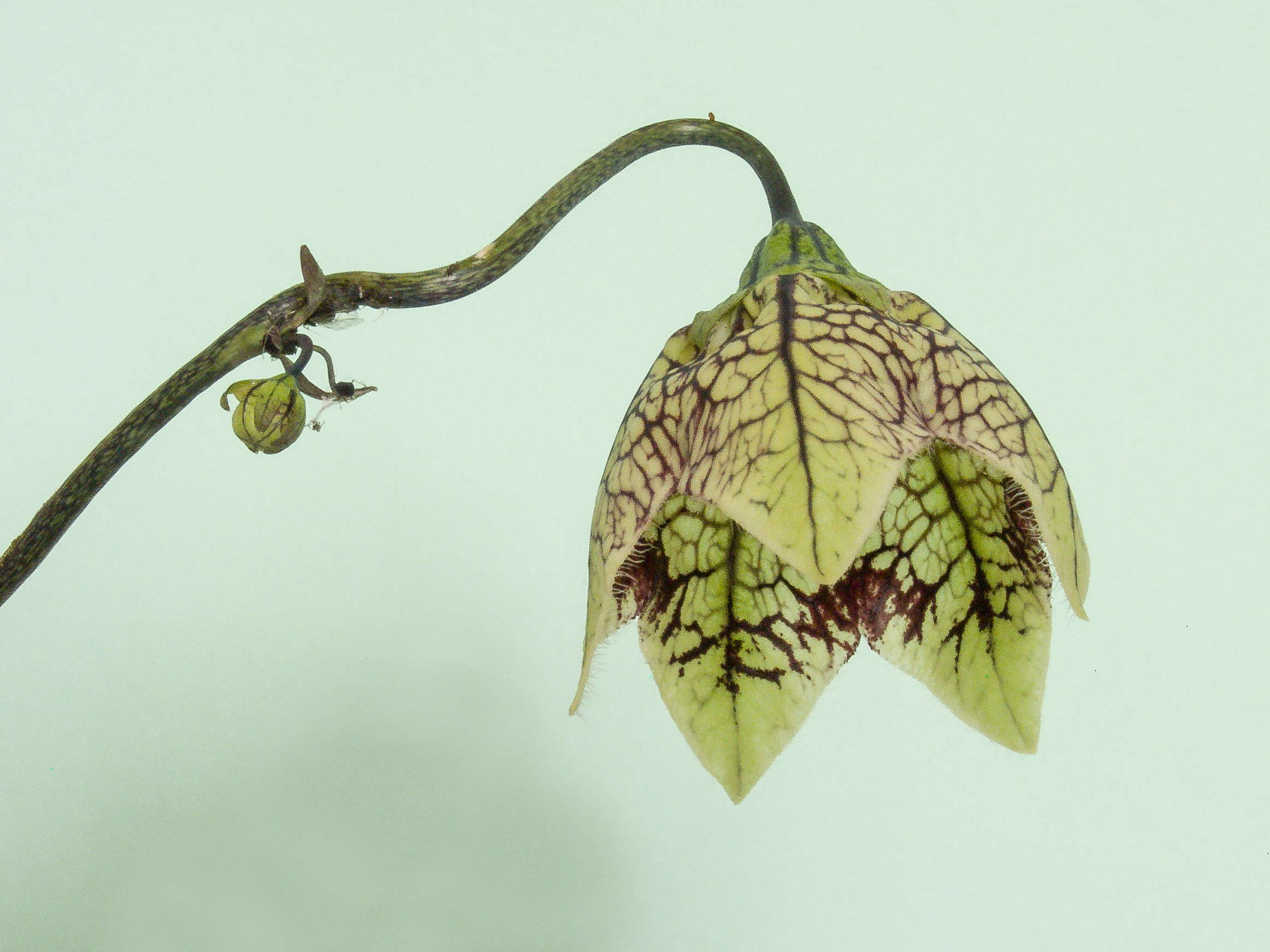
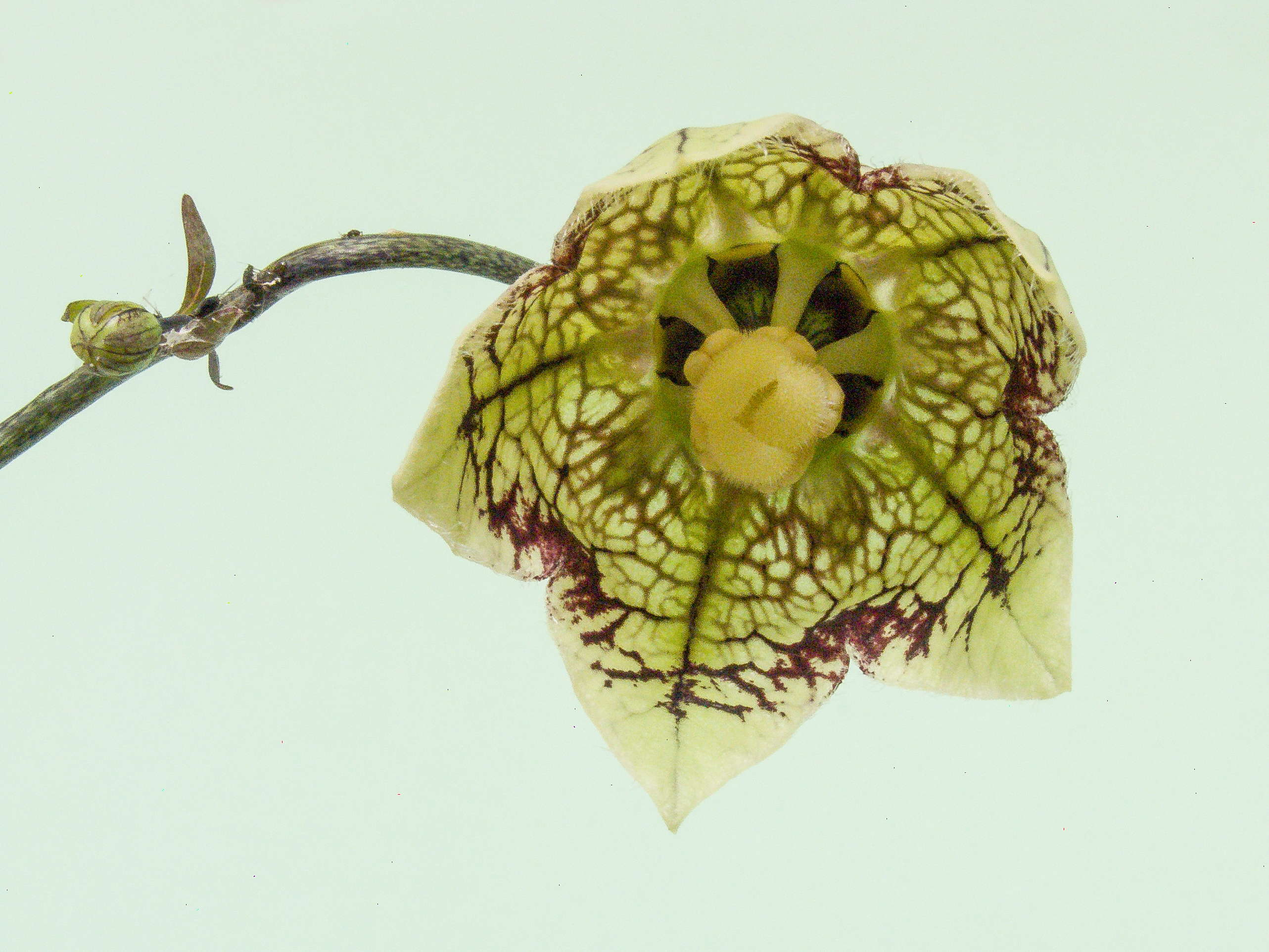
Newly opened flower
