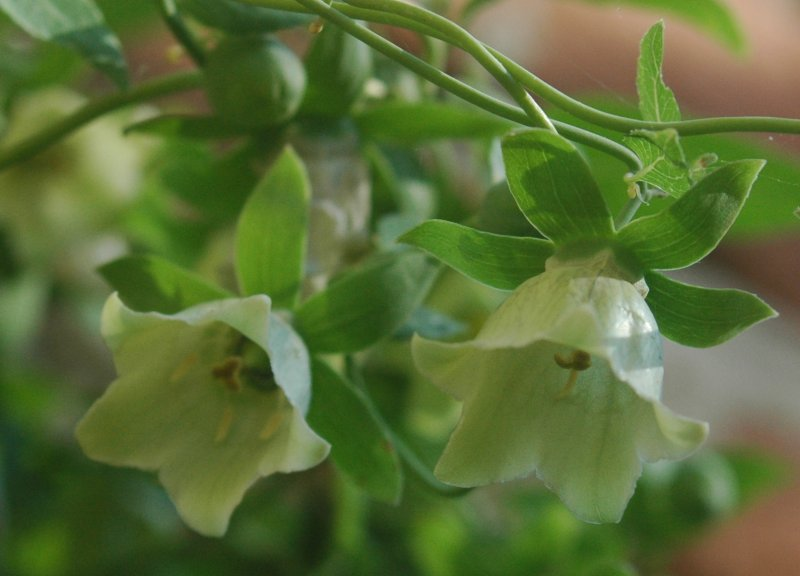
- Codonopsis pilosula

Scientific classification
- Kingdom: Plantae
- Clade: Tracheophytes
- Clade: Angiosperms
- Clade: Eudicots
- Clade: Asterids
- Order: Asterales
- Family: Campanulaceae
- Subfamily: Campanuloideae
- Genus: Codonopsis; Wall.

Synonyms
- Campanumoea Blume (1825); Glosocomia D.Don (1825); Glossocomia Rchb. (1828), orth. var.; Leptocodon (Hook.f.) Lem. (1856)

= Codonopsis =

Genus of flowering plants

Codonopsis is a genus of flowering plant in the family Campanulaceae. As currently recognized, Codonopsis includes two other groups sometimes separated as distinct genera, i.e. Campanumoea and Leptocodon. The enlarged genus Codonopsis is widespread across eastern, southern, central, and southeastern Asia, including China, Japan, the Russian Far East, Kazakhstan, the Indian subcontinent, Iran, Indochina, Indonesia, etc.

== Species ==
49 species are accepted.

- Codonopsis affinis Hook.f. & Thomson – China, Himalayas, Myanmar (Chinese: 大叶党参)
- Codonopsis alpina Nannf. – (高山党参) – west-central China, northern Myanmar, and Tibet
- Codonopsis argentea P.C.Tsoong – (银背叶党参) – west-central China
- Codonopsis atriplicifolia Yan Yu & Qiang Wang
- Codonopsis bactriana F.O.Khass., U.Kodyrov & A.Myrz.
- Codonopsis benthamii Hook.f. & Thomson – China, Himalayas, Myanmar
- Codonopsis bhutanica Ludlow – Bhutan, Nepal, Tibet
- Codonopsis bomiensis D.Y.Hong
- Codonopsis bragaensis Grey-Wilson – Nepal
- Codonopsis bulleyana Forrest ex Diels – (管钟党参)
- Codonopsis campanulata D.Y.Hong
- Codonopsis canescens Nannf. – (灰毛党参)
- Codonopsis cardiophylla Diels ex Kom. – (光叶党参)
- Codonopsis chimiliensis J.Anthony – Yunnan, Myanmar (滇湎党参)
- Codonopsis chlorocodon C.Y.Yu – (绿钟党参)
- Codonopsis clematidea (Schrenk) C.B.Clarke – Central Asia, Tibet, Xinjiang, Iran, Afghanistan, Pakistan, western Himalayas (新疆党参)
- Codonopsis cordifolioidea P.C.Tsoong – (心叶党参)
- Codonopsis deltoidea Chipp – (三角叶党参)
- Codonopsis elliptica D.Y.Hong
- Codonopsis farreri J.Anthony (synonym Codonopsis gombalana C.Y.Wu) – Yunnan, Myanmar – (秃叶党参, 贡山党参)
- Codonopsis foetens Hook.f. & Thomson – China, eastern Himalayas (臭党参)
- Codonopsis gongshanica Qiang Wang & D.Y.Hong
- Codonopsis gracilis Hook.f. & Thomson – Yunnan, Myanmar, Nepal, Bhutan, Assam
- Codonopsis hemisphaerica P.C.Tsoong ex D.Y.Hong
- Codonopsis henryi Oliv. (synonym Codonopsis levicalyx L.D.Shen) – (川鄂党参, 光萼党参)
- Codonopsis hongii Lammers
- Codonopsis inflata Hook.f. & Thomson – Tibet, Nepal, Bhutan, Assam
- Codonopsis javanica (Blume) Hook.f. & Thomson – widespread across China, Japan, Himalayas, Indochina, Java, Sumatra
- Codonopsis kawakamii Hayata – Taiwan (台湾党参)
- Codonopsis lanceolata (Siebold & Zucc.) Benth. & Hook.f. ex Trautv. – China, Korea, Japan, Russian Far East (羊乳)
- Codonopsis lixianica D.Y.Hong
- Codonopsis macrophylla Lammers & L.l.Klein – Tibet
- Codonopsis meleagris Diels – (珠鸡斑党参)
- Codonopsis micrantha Chipp – (小花党参)
- Codonopsis microtubulosa Z.T.Wang & G.J.Xu
- Codonopsis obtusa (Chipp) Nannf.
- Codonopsis ovata Benth. – Pakistan, Kashmir
- Codonopsis pilosula (Franch.) Nannf. – China, Mongolia, Korea, Primorye (党参)
- Codonopsis rotundifolia Benth. – Tibet, Yunnan, Himalayas (India, Pakistan, Nepal, Bhutan)
- Codonopsis subglobosa W.W.Sm. – (球花党参)
- Codonopsis subscaposa Kom. – (抽葶党参)
- Codonopsis subsimplex Hook.f. & Thomson – Tibet, Himalayas (India, Nepal, Bhutan) (藏南党参)
- Codonopsis thalictrifolia Wall. – Tibet, Himalayas (India, Nepal, Bhutan) – (唐松草党参)
- Codonopsis tsinglingensis Pax & K.Hoffm. – (秦岭党参)
- Codonopsis tubulosa Kom. – (管花党参)
- Codonopsis ussuriensis (Rupr. & Maxim.) Hemsl. – China, Japan, Korea, Primorye (雀斑党参)
- Codonopsis viridiflora Maxim. – (绿花党参)
- Codonopsis viridis Wall. – Tibet, Himalayas (India, Pakistan, Nepal, Bhutan)

=== Formerly placed here ===
- Himalacodon dicentrifolius (C.B.Clarke) D.Y.Hong & Qiang Wang (as Codonopsis dicentrifolia (C.B.Clarke) W.W.Sm.) – (珠峰党参)
- Pankycodon purpureus (Wall.) D.Y.Hong & X.T.Ma (as Codonopsis purpurea Wall.) – Tibet, Yunnan, Himalayas (India, Nepal, Bhutan) (紫花党参)
- Pseudocodon convolvulaceus (Kurz) D.Y.Hong & H.Sun (as Codonopsis convolvulacea Kurz) – Tibet, Yunnan, Nepal, Bhutan, Assam, Myanmar (鸡蛋参)
  - Pseudocodon convolvulaceus subsp. forrestii (Diels) D.Y.Hong (as Codonopsis forrestii Diels) – China, Myanmar
- Pseudocodon rosulatus (W.W.Sm.) D.Y.Hong (as Codonopsis rosulata W.W.Sm.) – (莲座状党参)

== Uses ==
=== Medicinal uses ===
Codonopsis pilosula (Chinese: 党参; pinyin: dǎngshēn) is an important medicinal herb in traditional Chinese medicine.

=== Food uses ===
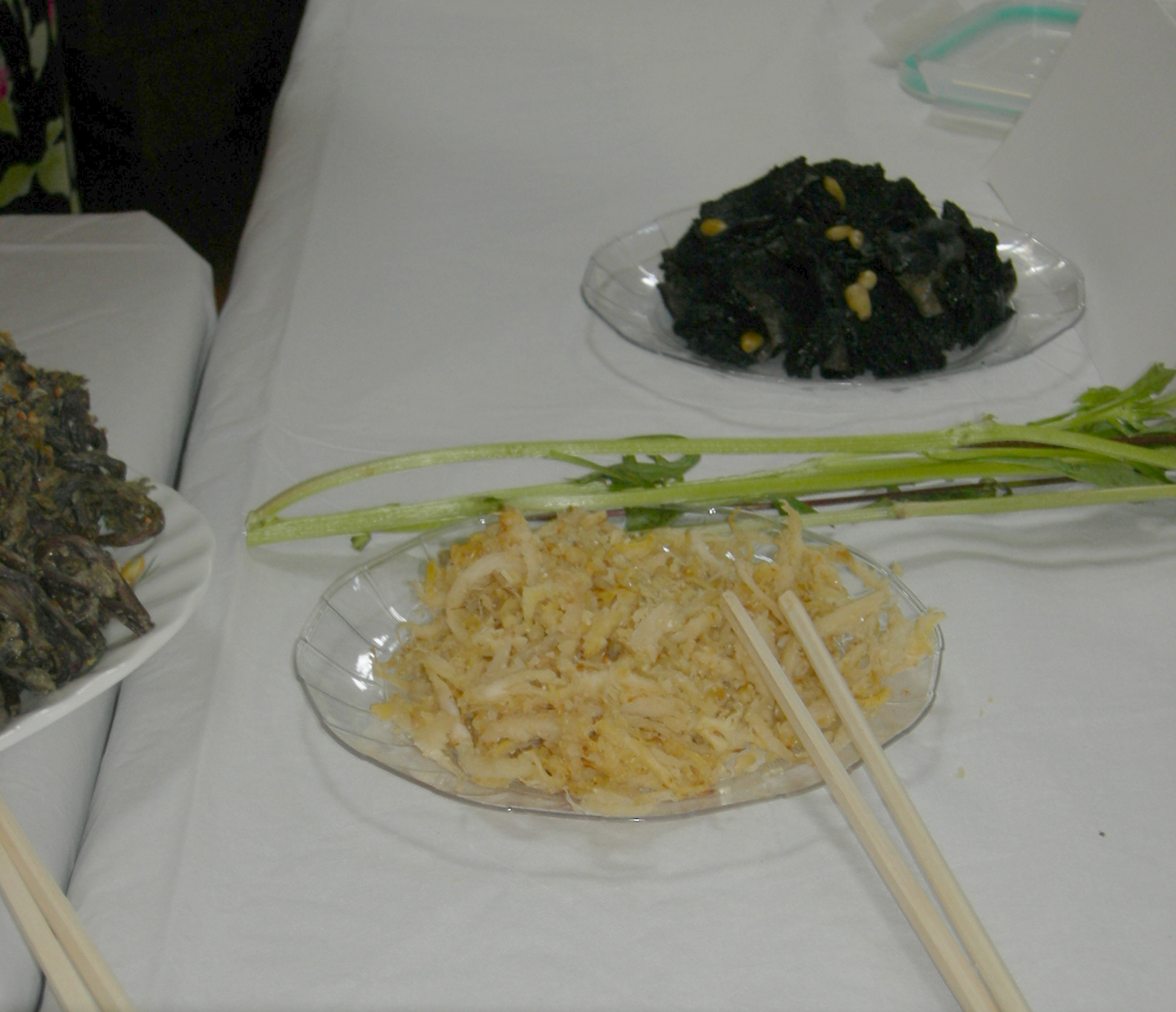
Deodeok muchim, a Korean salad made from C. lanceolata

Codonopsis lanceolata (Korean: deodeok) is used as a food in Korean cuisine.
