= Gui (food) =

Korean grilled dish

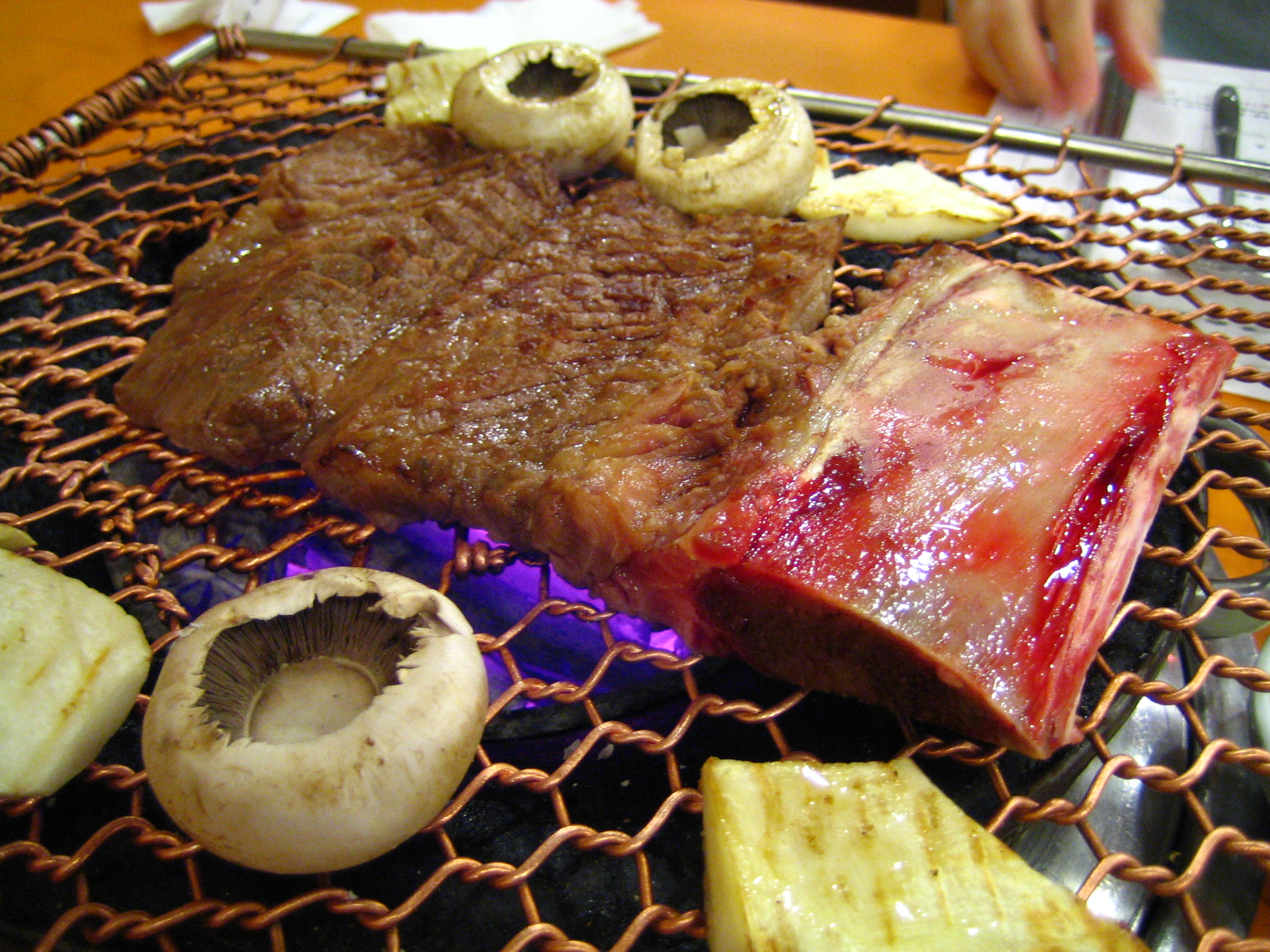
- Galbi, a variety of gui

Korean name
- Hangul: 구이
- RR: gui
- MR: kui

Gui (Korean: 구이; pronounced [kuː.i]) refers to grilled dishes in Korean cuisine. Gui most commonly has meat or fish as the primary ingredient, but may, in some cases, also have grilled vegetables or other vegetarian ingredients. The term derives from the verb gupda (굽다), which literally means "grill". At traditional restaurants, meats are cooked at the center of the table over a charcoal grill, surrounded by various banchan and individual rice bowls. The cooked meat is then cut into small pieces and wrapped with fresh lettuce leaves, rice, thinly sliced garlic, ssamjang (a mixture of gochujang and dwenjang), and other seasonings. The suffix gui is often omitted in the names of meat-based gui such as galbi, originally named galbi gui.

== Types ==
Koreans enjoying grilled meat and alcohol in the 18th century

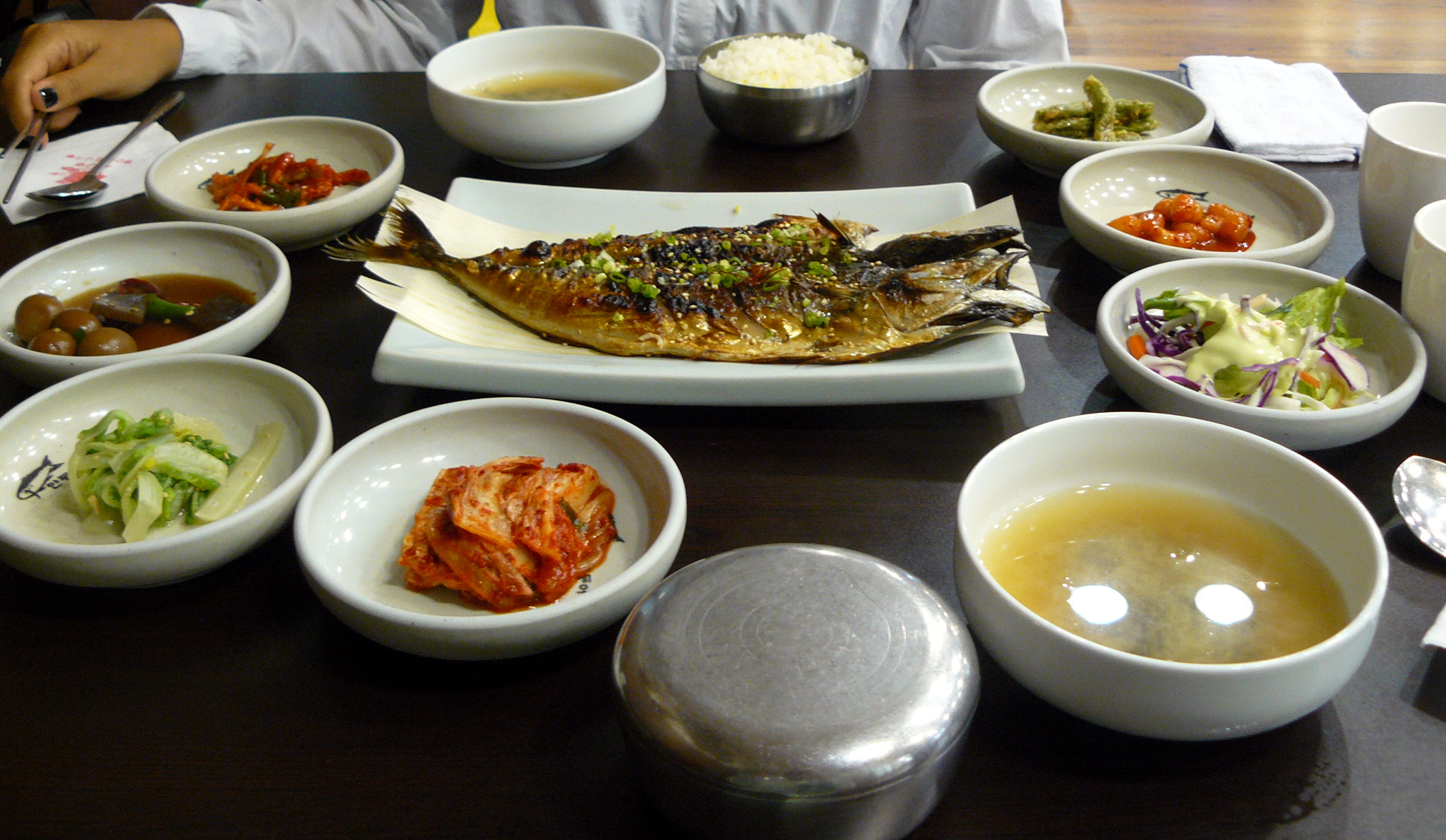
Godeungeo gui

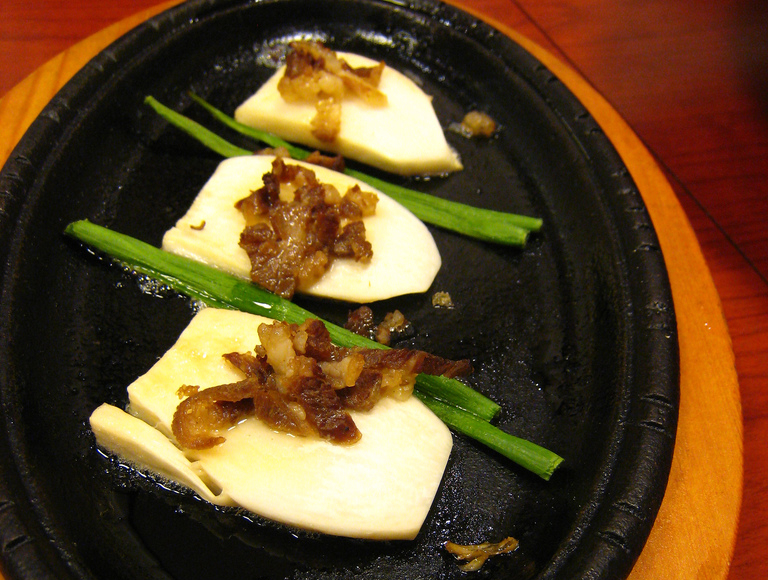
Songi gui (송이구이), grilled matsutake in Korean cuisine

=== Meat ===
Meat-based grilled dishes are collectively called gogi gui (고기구이).

- Bulgogi (불고기): thinly sliced or shredded beef marinated in soy sauce, sesame oil, garlic, sugar, green onions, and black pepper, cooked on a grill (sometimes at the table). Bulgogi literally means "fire meat." Variations include pork (dweji bulgogi), chicken (dak bulgogi), or squid (ojingeo bulgogi).
- Galbi (갈비): pork or beef ribs, cooked on a metal plate over charcoal in the centre of the table. The meat is sliced thicker than bulgogi. It is often called "Korean barbecue" along with bulgogi, and can be seasoned or unseasoned. A variation using seasoned chicken is called dak galbi.
- Samgyeopsal (삼겹살): Unseasoned pork bacon cut from the belly, served in the same fashion as galbi. Sometimes cooked on a grill with kimchi together at either side. Commonly grilled with garlic and onions, dipped in ssamjjang and wrapped in lettuce leaves.
- Dakgui (닭구이): grilled chicken
- Saengchi gui (생치구이): grilled pheasant

=== Offal ===
Gui made with pig or cow's intestines is collectively called naejang gui (내장구이) or yang gui (양구이).

- Makchang gui (막창구이): grilled pork large intestines prepared like samgyeopsal and galbi, and often served with a light doenjang sauce and chopped scallions. It is very popular in Daegu and the surrounding Gyeongsang region.
- Gopchang gui (곱창구이): similar to makchang except prepared from the small intestines of pork (or ox)

=== Seafood ===
Gui made with fish is called saengseon gui (생선구이) that literally means "grilled fish", while grilled shellfishes are called seokhwa gui (석화구이) or jogae gui (조개구이)

- Jangeo gui (장어구이), sliced and roasted eel in gochujang or ganjang
- Gomjangeo gui (곰장어구이), similar to jangeo gui but pike eel is cooked whole immediately after being killed so it is still moving on the grill
- Godeungeo gui (고등어구이): grilled mackerel
- Jogi gui (조기구이): grilled croaker
- Garibi gui (가리비구이): grilled scallops
- Samchi gui (삼치구이): grilled Japanese Spanish mackerel
- Daeha gui (대하구이): grilled Chinese white shrimp
- Jeonbok gui (전복구이): grilled abalone

=== Vegetable and mushroom ===
- Dubu gui (두부구이): grilled tofu rectangles
- Deodeok gui (더덕구이): grilled deodeok (Codonopsis lanceolata; 더덕)
- Beoseot gui (버섯구이): grilled mushroom
  - Songi gui (송이구이): grilled matsutake
- Gim gui or guun gim (김구이 or 구운 김): grilled gim (nori)

== See also ==
- Asado
- Korean barbecue
- Barbecue
- Regional variations of barbecue
- Jeok
