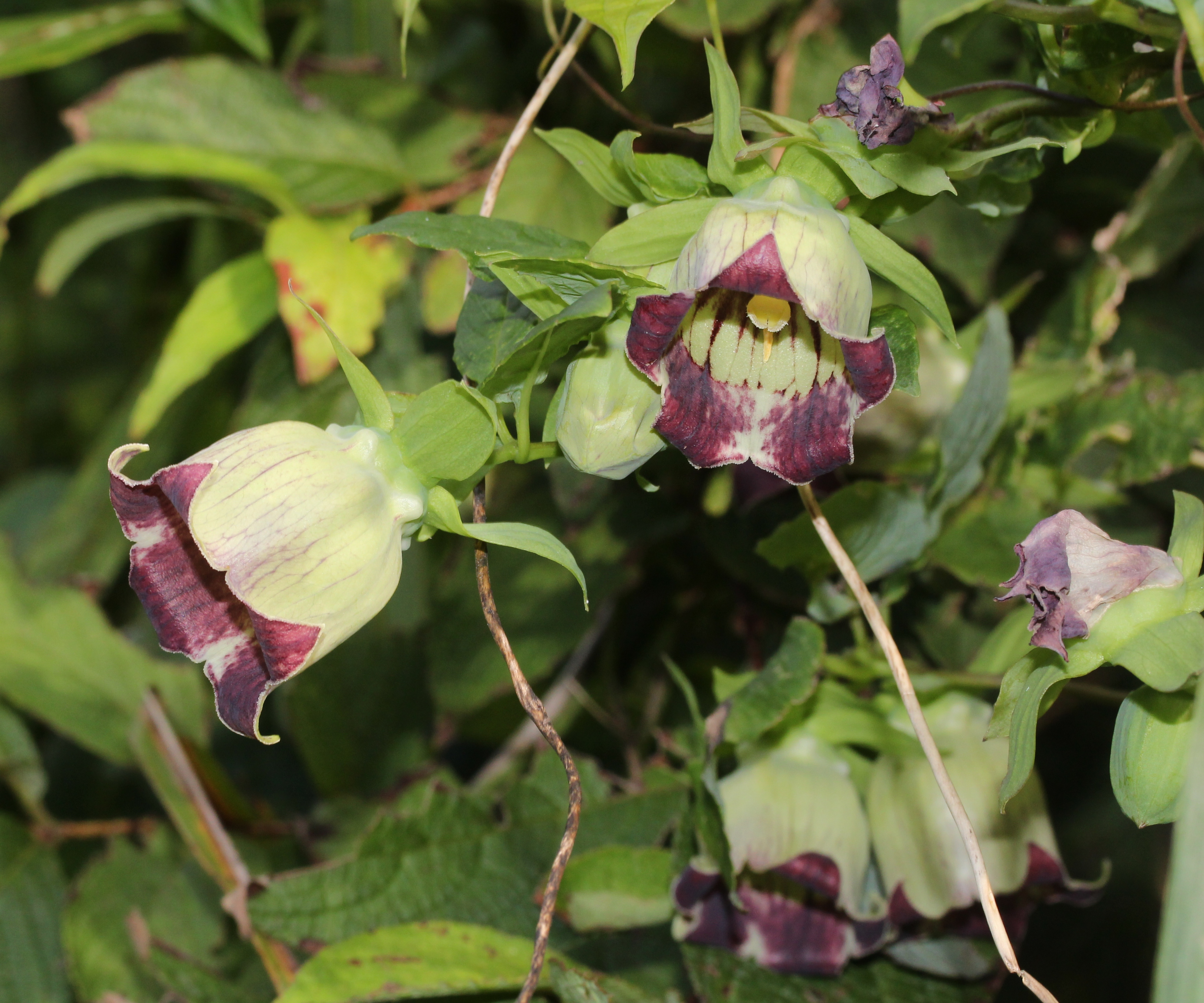

Scientific classification
- Kingdom: Plantae
- Clade: Tracheophytes
- Clade: Angiosperms
- Clade: Eudicots
- Clade: Asterids
- Order: Asterales
- Family: Campanulaceae
- Genus: Codonopsis
- Species: C. lanceolata

Binomial name
- Codonopsis lanceolata (Siebold & Zucc.) Trautv.

= Codonopsis lanceolata =

Species of flowering plant

Codonopsis lanceolata, also called deodeok (더덕), todok, or lance asiabell, is a flowering plant native to East Asia (China, Japan, Korea, and the Russian Far East). It is a variety of bonnet bellflower.

== Description ==
Codonopsis lanceolata is a hardy perennial climber that grows up to 4.5 m tall. It has bell-shaped flowers that are purple inside.

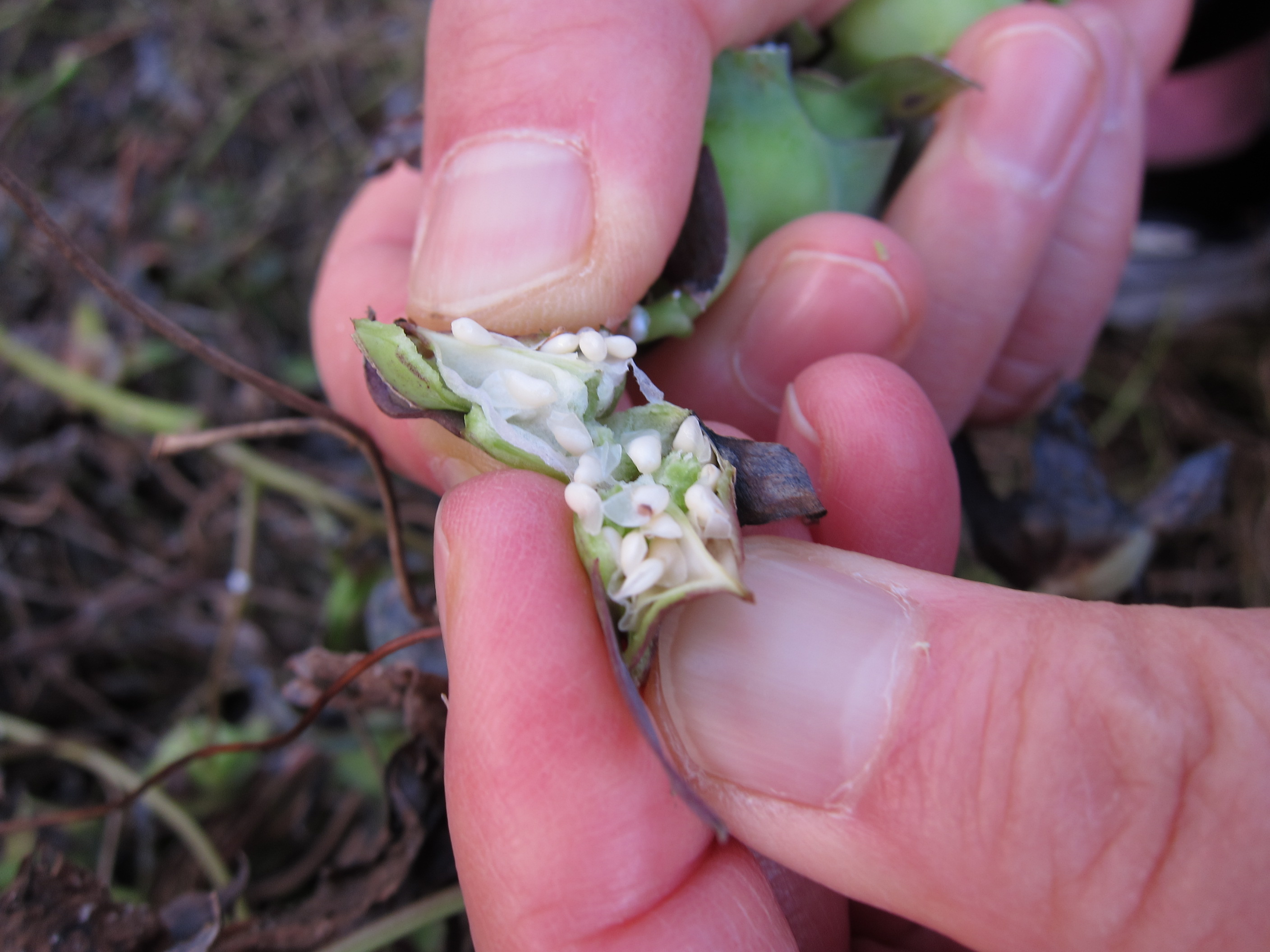
Seeds

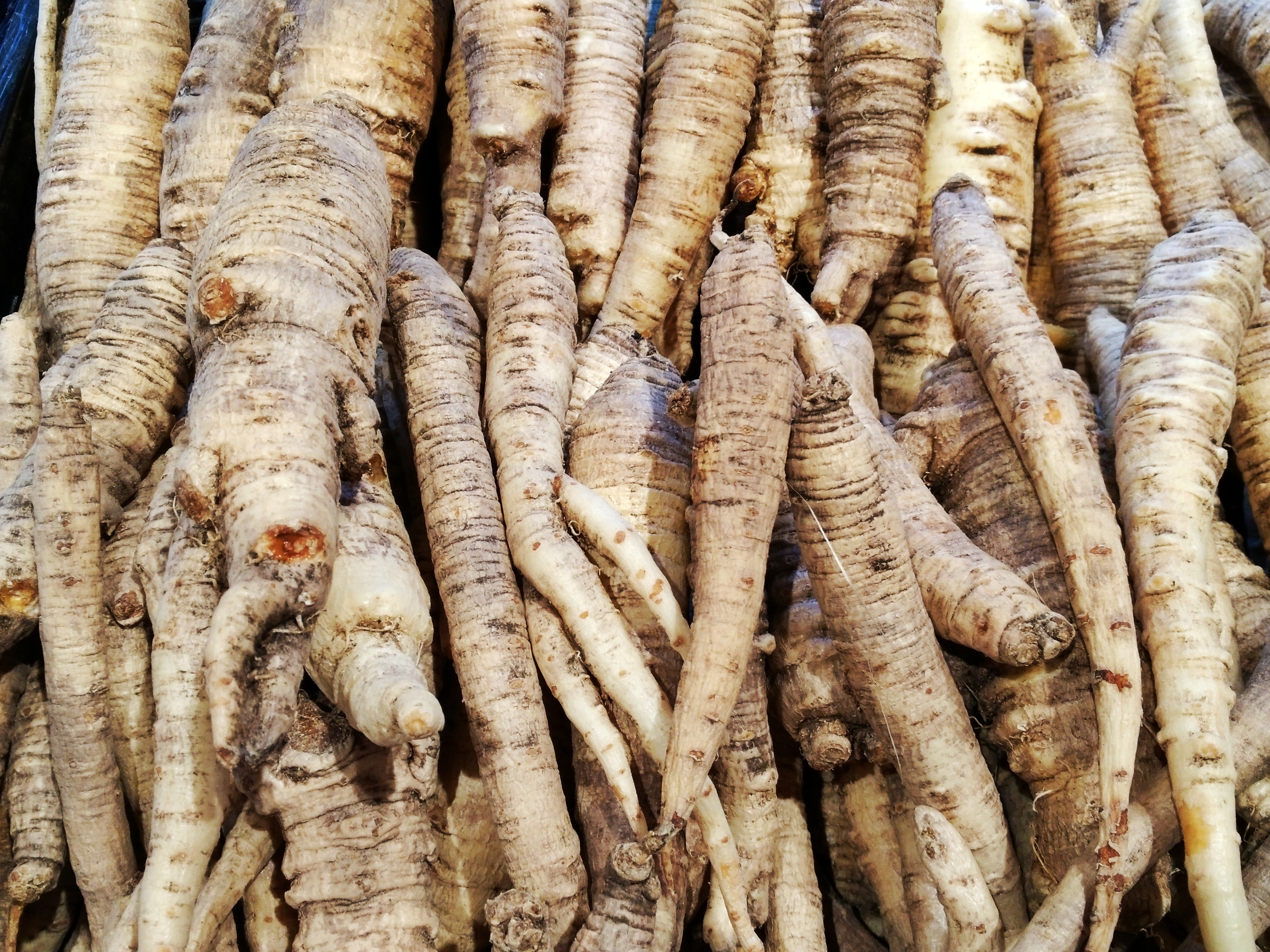
Roots

== Cultivation ==
Codonopsis lanceolata grows in moist areas in woodland on low hills or mountains at an elevation of 200–1600 m. The plant grows best in light and medium-well drained soils with plenty of moisture with a neutral to semi-acidic pH and in full sun to semi-shade. It will grow to a height of 15 feet (4.6 m) high, blooming in late summer, but it dies back each winter. The flower blooms from August to September, and the seeds ripen from September to October.

The plant may be propagated by seeds that are surface-sown onto acidic soil. Division is also possible, although the plant is intolerant of root disturbance and is especially vulnerable at young stages to slugs. It is hermaphroditic and may be pollinated by bees and wasps.

The plant is grown commercially in Hoengseong County, Gangwon Province, South Korea, where it is an important part of the local agriculture. Many South Koreans also grow a small amount in personal gardens.

== Uses ==
=== Culinary ===
==== Korea ====
The roots of Codonopsis lanceolata, deodeok (더덕) in Korean, are used in Korean cuisine. They are eaten both fresh and cooked. The plant's roots have been described as having similar texture to celery root, though the flavor is different. Grilled deodeok marinated in gochujang, called deodeok-gui (더덕구이), is served as a vegetarian main dish. Deodeok can be pan-fried as jeon, pickled as kimchi, or used in fusion dishes such as salads. They can also be made into alcohol, called deodeokju (더덕주), traditionally home-brewed and used for medicinal purposes. Deodeok is also known as sasam (사삼; 沙蔘) which means 'sand ginseng', a herb also used in traditional Korean medicine.

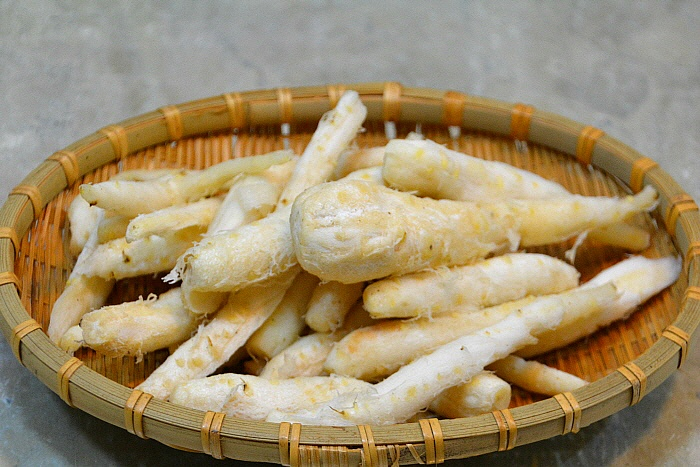
Washed and peeled deodeok

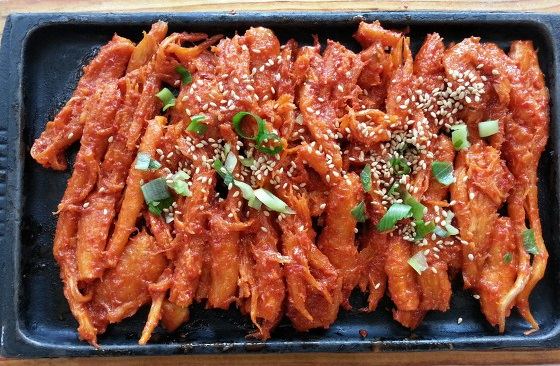
Deodeok-gui (grilled deodeok)

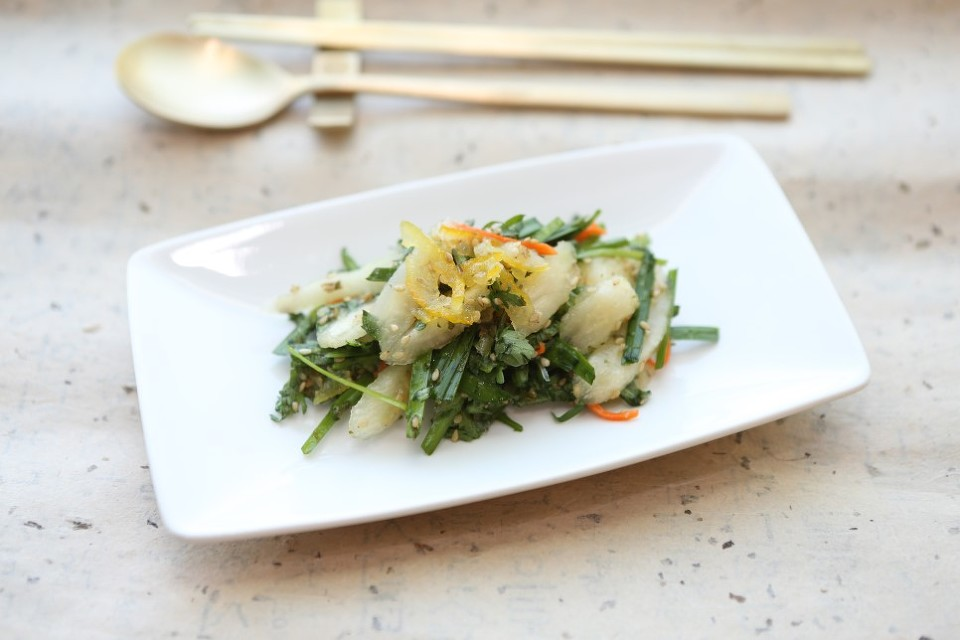
Deodeok salad with yuja dressing

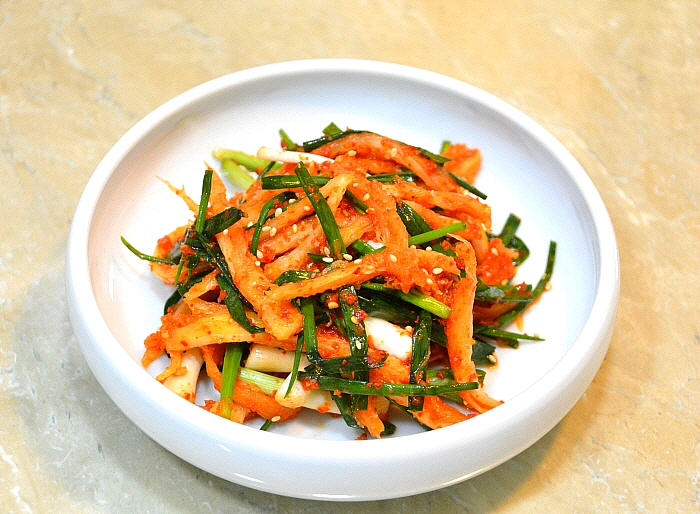
Deodeok-kimchi

=== Medicinal ===
Codonopsis lanceolata is used in Korean and Chinese traditional medicine, as have several other plants in the same genus, likely due to varying concentrations of polyacetylenes, phenylpropanoids, alkaloids, triterpenoids and polysaccharides in the plants' roots. Codonopsis lanceolata in particular has been used to treat bronchitis, asthma, cough, tuberculosis, dyspepsia and psychoneurosis. It has also been thought to have anti-cancer properties.

== Etymology ==
The specific epithet of lanceolata refers to the plant's lance-shaped leaves. The genus name, Codonopsis, is derived from the Greek κώδων (kodon) "bell" and ὄψις (opsis) "eye, to see", referring to the shape of the petals of the flower.
