= Makchang =

Korean cow stomach dish

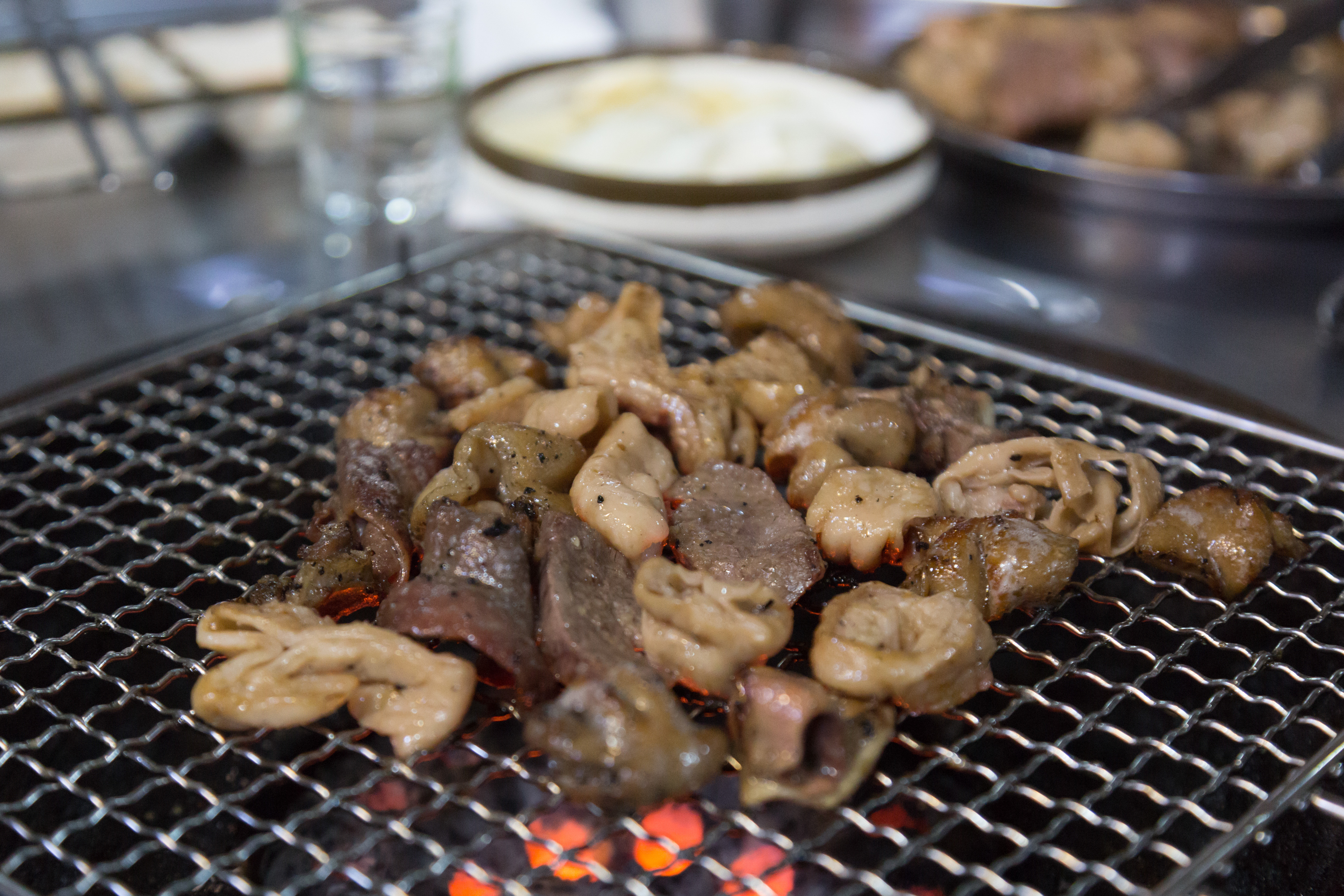
- Makchang-gui
- Type: Gui
- Place of origin: Korea
- Associated cuisine: Korean cuisine
- Main ingredients: Beef abomasum or pork rectum
- Food energy (per 100 g serving): 61 kcal (260 kJ)

Korean name
- Hangul: 막창
- Lit.: last viscus
- RR: makchang
- MR: makch'ang
- IPA: [mak̚.tɕʰaŋ]

Makchang (Korean: 막창; lit. last viscus) or so-makchang (소막창; "beef last viscus") is a Korean dish of either the abomasum (the fourth and final stomach compartment in ruminants) of cattle or the gui (grilled dish) made of beef abomasum. The latter is also called makchang-gui (막창구이; lit. grilled last viscus) or so-makchang-gui (소막창구이; lit. grilled beef last viscus). Dwaeji-makchang (돼지막창; lit. pork last viscus) means either the rectum of pig or the gui made of pork rectum, and the grilled dish is also referred to as dwaeji-makchang-gui (돼지막창구이; lit. grilled pork last viscus).

They are often served with a light doenjang sauce and chopped scallions. High calcium content and high catabolism for alcohol makes it a favorite anju (side dish for drinking).

Makchang gui is said to have originated in Daegu and the surrounding Gyeongsang Province region. King Seonjo of Joseon is said to have enjoyed the dish at his coronation.

== Preparation and serving ==
Makchang is usually grilled over a barbecue, but preparation has to be done beforehand to rid the meat of odd odors and excessive fat. The meat may either be pre-boiled in water seasoned with doenjang, onions, medicinal herbs and such, or pre-marinated in a sauce made of various fruit (apple, Korean pear, pineapple, kiwi, etc.) before grilling.

The dipping sauce is made from a mixture of doenjang, ground beans, ground red pepper, and chopped scallions. Fresh green and red peppers, cucumbers, minari and garlic are sometimes added according to personal taste.

== See also ==
- Korean cuisine
- Chitterlings
