= Pakistani meat dishes =

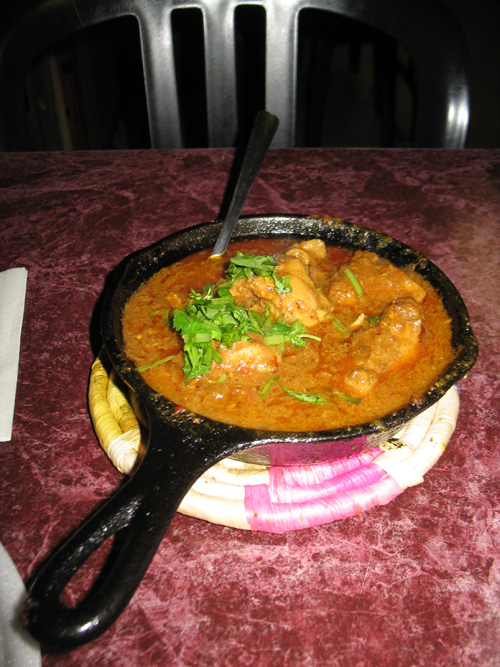
Chicken karahi in a Pakistani restaurant

Meat plays a much more dominant role in Pakistani cuisine as compared to other South Asian cuisines. The most popular are chicken, lamb, beef, goat, and fish. Beef is particularly sought after for kebab dishes or the classic beef shank dish nihari. Seafood is generally not consumed in large amounts, though it is very popular in the coastal areas of Sindh and the Makran coast of Balochistan.

== Halal ==
Muslims follow the Islamic law that lists foods and drinks that are Halal and permissible to consume. The criteria specify both what foods are allowed, and how the food must be prepared. The foods addressed are mostly types of meat/animal tissue.

== Meat dishes ==
Pakistani dishes can best be categorised by whether they contain gravy or not. Dishes with gravy which have lentils or legumes as the main ingredient are known as dals in Urdu. The remaining gravied dishes are called salaans. Salaans containing meat will either have meat on its own or in combination with a second major ingredient, such as a vegetable, or a grain or a legume. Salaans which contain meat as their main ingredient can be further subdivided by the type of meat involved. Meats normally used in Pakistani cuisine are beef, lamb, goat, chicken and occasionally game. Offal is also used in several Pakistani dishes. Salaans with meat as their main ingredient include the well-known Pakistani dishes nihari, kunna, qorma and qeema. The first two are stews which are most frequently made using beef and mutton respectively. Qormas are stews which can be made with a variety of meats, and are flavoured with beaten yoghurt or nut pastes. Qeemas are made with minced meat, usually beef or lamb or more rarely poultry. Salaans frequently combine meat and seasonal vegetables. Favourite combinations are beef/goat/lamb with spinach/turnips/radishes/gourds/potatoes/tomatoes/peppers/aubergines. Meat can also be combined with legumes, to produce dal gosht (meat and lentils), haleem (meat with lentils and grains), and harees or hareesa (meat with lentils and grains). Meat combined with grains are the basis for biryani and pilaf, in which rice is combined with beef/lamb/chicken/goat. Offal is widely available and is a favourite for both home cooking as well as in restaurants. Liver, kidneys, heart and trotters are the main offal items cooked at home. All of these together with testicles, tripe, brains and lungs are cooked in restaurants. Speciality offal restaurants, known as takatak or kata-kat, combine customer-specified offal items with butter, tomatoes, peppers etc.

Generally, the preparation method involves cooking pieces of meat over medium heat with various spices, or simmered with potatoes.

== Barbecue and kebabs ==
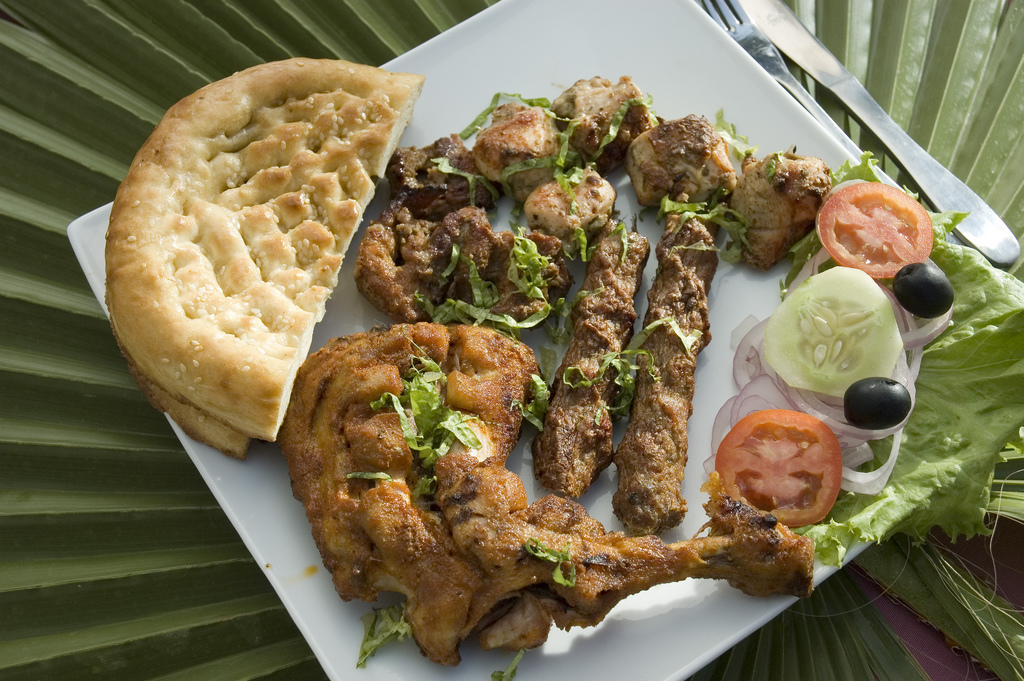
A variety of dishes cooked under the barbecue method

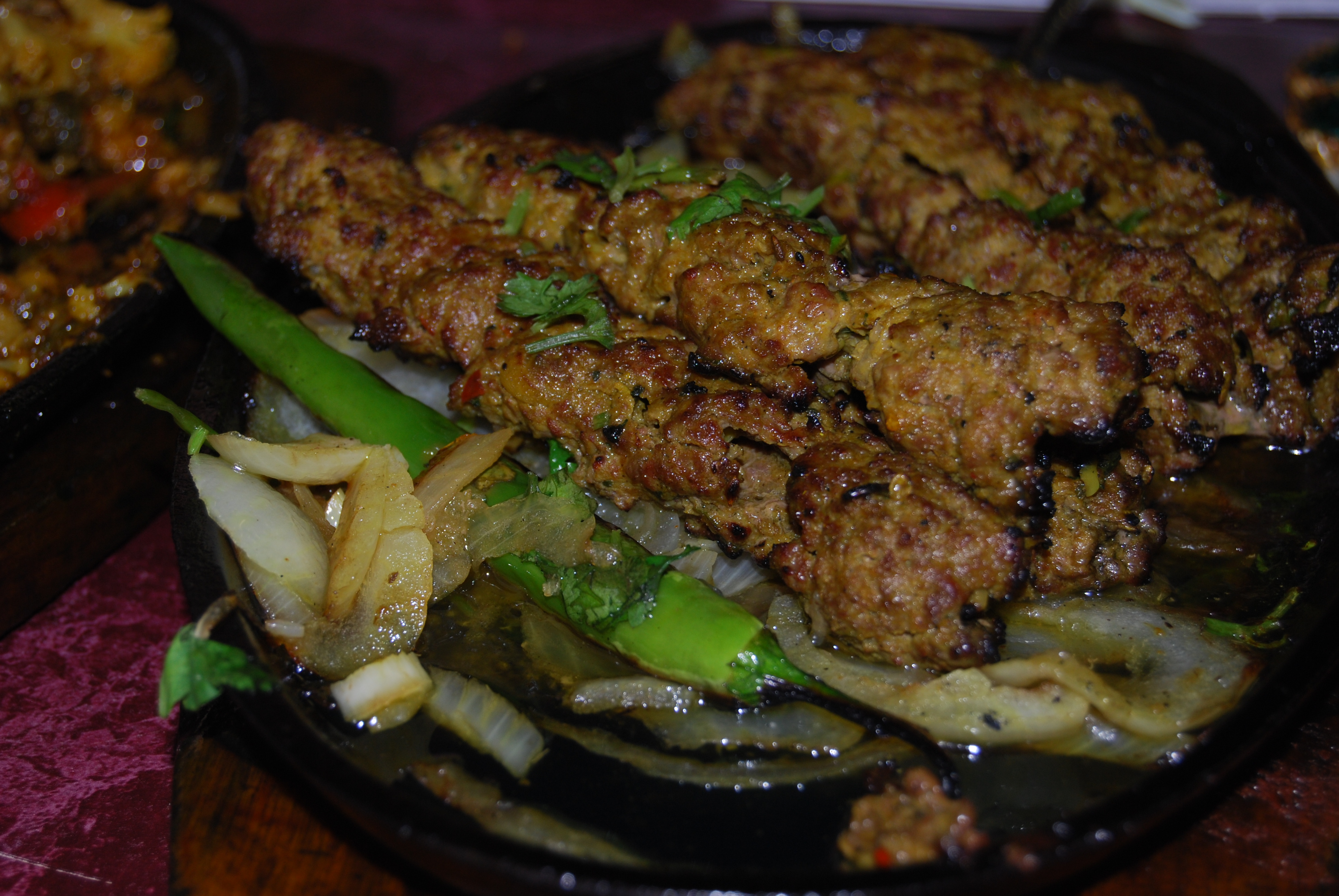
Seekh kebab – one of the famous Pakistani food specialities

Meat has played an important part in the region of Pakistan for centuries. Sajji is a Baluchi dish from Western Pakistan, made up of lamb with spices, that has also become popular all over the country. Another Balochi meat dish involves building a large outdoor fire and slowly cooking chickens. The chickens are placed on skewers which are staked into the ground close to the fire, so that the radiant heat slowly cooks the prepared chickens.

Kebabs are a staple item in Pakistani cuisine today, and one can find countless varieties all over the country. Each region has its own varieties but some, like Seekh kebab, Chicken Tikka, and Shami kebab, are especially popular varieties throughout the country. Generally, kebabs from Balochistan and the Khyber Pakhtunkhwa are identical to the Afghan style of barbecue, with salt and coriander being the only seasoning used. Karachi and the wider Sindh region arefamous for their spicy kebabs, often marinated in a mixture of spices, lemon juice and dahi (yogurt). Grilled chicken and mutton are also very popular in some cities of Punjab such as Lahore, Gujranwala and Sialkot. Kebab shops are said to be the most profitable food businesses in Pakistan.

=== Kebabs ===
Types of kebabs (mainly made of beef or lamb) are:

- Seekh kebab (Urdu: سيخ کباب) - A long skewer of beef mixed with herbs and seasonings. Takes its name from the skewer.
- Shami kebab (Urdu: شامی کباب) - A Shami kebab is a small patty of minced beef or chicken and ground chickpeas and spices.
- Chapli kebab (Urdu: چپلی کباب) - A spiced, tangy round kebab made of ground beef and cooked in animal fat. A speciality of Peshawar in Khyber-Pakhtunkhwa.
- Chicken kebab (Urdu: مرغ کباب) (Moorgh-Kuh-bob) - A popular kebab that is found both with bone and without.
- Lamb kebab (Urdu: کبابِ برہ گوشت) - The all lamb meat kebab is usually served as cubes.
- Bihari kebab (Urdu: بہاری کباب) - Skewer of beef mixed with herbs and seasoning.
- Shashlik (Urdu: شیشلیک) - Grilled baby lamb chops (usually from the leg), typically marinated
- Bun kebab (Urdu: بن کباب) - A unique kebab sandwich with beef, lamb, fish or chicken.
- Shawarma (Urdu: شاورما) - Comprises slices cut from a stack of meat strips (usually lamb), grilled in a vertical rotisserie. These are placed in a naan with chutney and salad.
- Tikka kebab (Urdu: تکہ کباب) - A kebab made of beef, lamb or chicken, cut into cubes, marinated with a yogurt blend and grilled on coals.
- Boti Kebab (Urdu: بوٹی کباب) - A kebab made from beef, lamb or chicken cubes and is popular in Multan. Sometimes marinated with green papaya to help tenderize the meat.
- Kaleji Kebab (Urdu: کلیجی کباب) - A kebab made of grilled and marinated pieces of beef, lamb or chicken liver, though usually lamb.

== See also ==
- List of Pakistani soups and stews
