= Burdur şiş =

Type of Turkish kebab

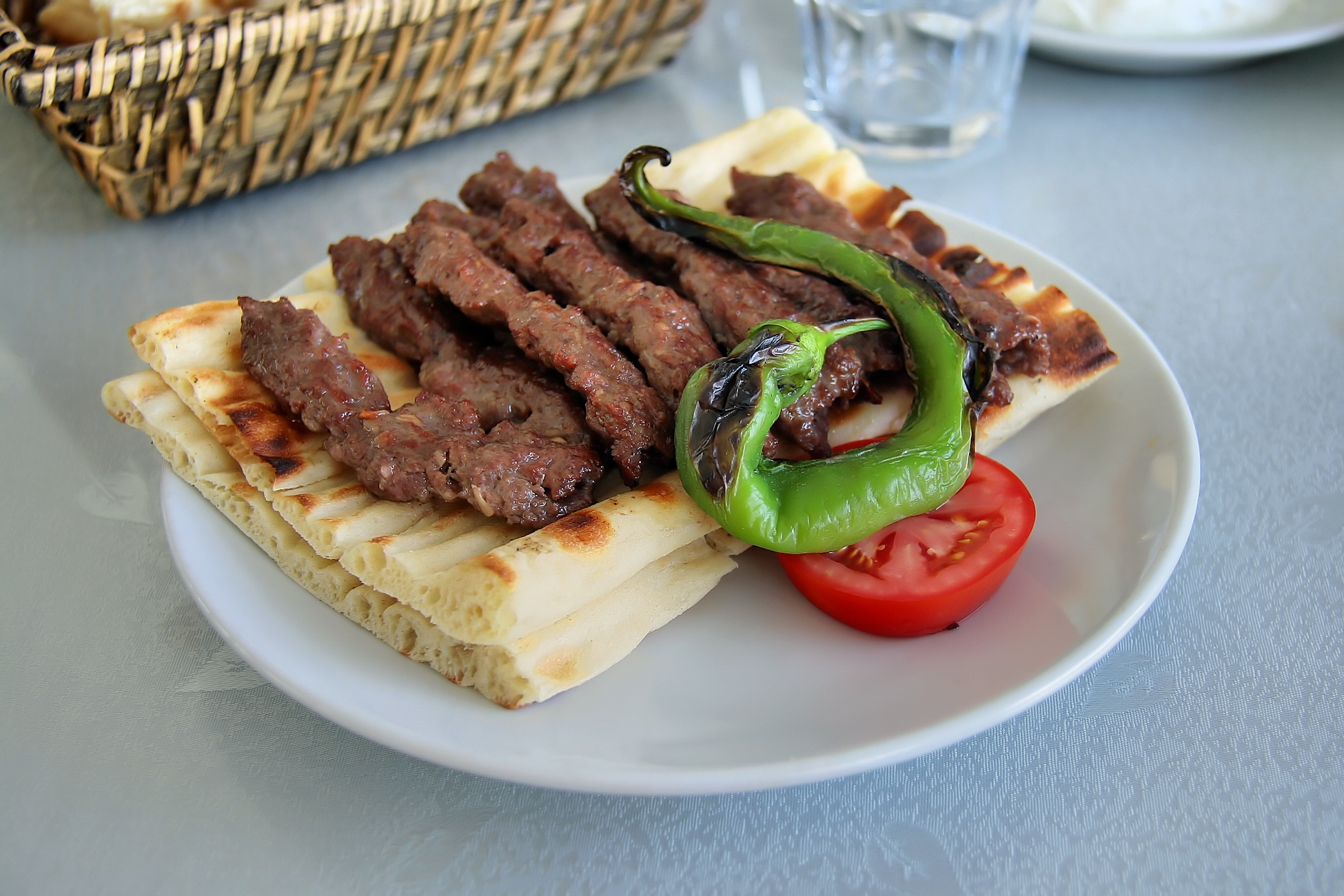
Burdur şiş

Burdur şiş, which is popular in and around Burdur, Turkey, is a type of kebab or köfte dish in Turkish cuisine. It is made differently than şiş köfte, as it does not contain any spice or herbs except salt and it is always eaten with a special type of pide. Burdur şiş obtained geographical indication from the Turkish Patent and Trademark Office in 2010.

== History ==
Although it was made with minced goat meat in the early 19th century, it is now made with minced fat beef due to decreased goat raising and changing natural sociocultural system in years.

== See also ==
- Şiş Köfte
- Kebab
- Şiş Kebap
- List of Kebabs
- Turkish Cuisine
