= Pideli köfte =

Turkish dish

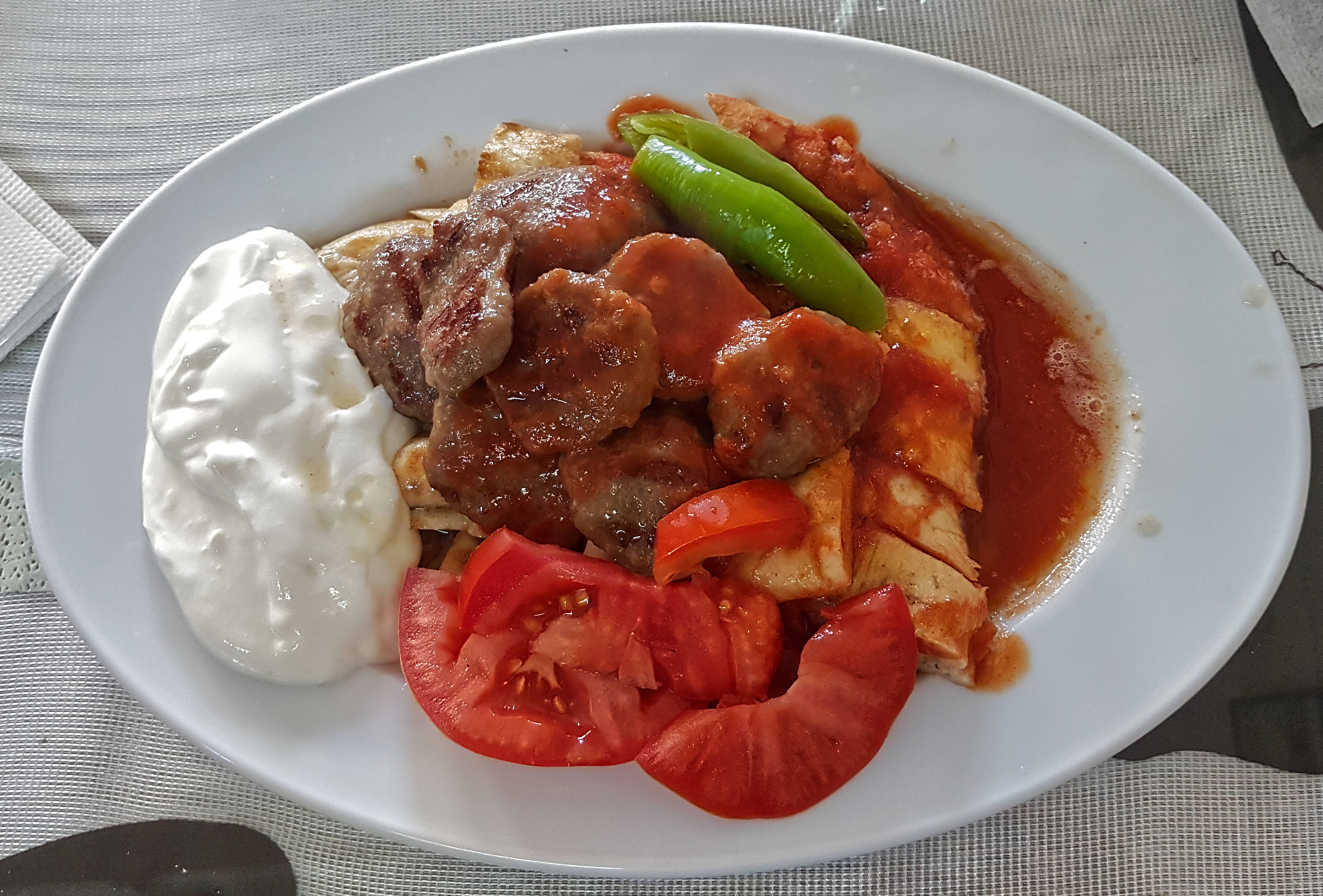
- Place of origin: Ottoman Empire
- Region or state: Bursa
- Serving temperature: Hot
- Main ingredients: köfte, tomato sauce, pita bread, melted sheep butter and yogurt
- Food energy (per serving): 800—1000

Pideli köfte is one of the best-known dishes of Turkey.

The dish consists of köfte topped with hot tomato sauce over pieces of pita bread and generously slathered with melted sheep's milk butter and yogurt. Tomato sauce and melted butter are generally poured over the dish, at the table.

== Regional Pideli köfte styles ==
- Manisa kebabı
- Balaban kebabı
- Köftender

== See also ==
- List of kebabs
