= Kabab torsh =

Traditional kebab from northern cities of Iran

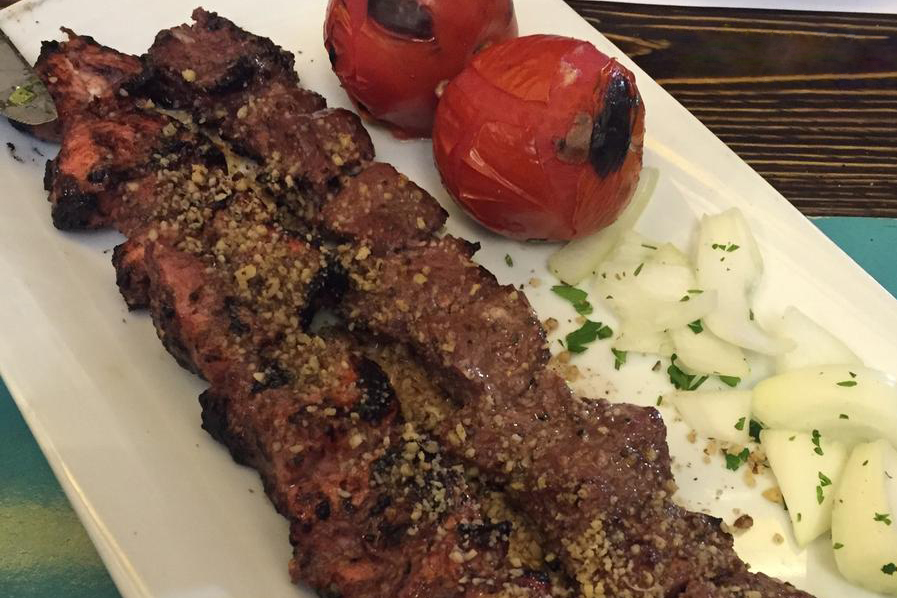
Kabab torsh

Kabab torsh or Kabab-e torsh (Persian: کباب ترش, lit. 'sour kebab') is a traditional kebab from Gilan and Mazandaran provinces in Iran. It is made with beef, usually sirloin or tenderloin, in recent years it has been made with chicken too. Red or white meat is marinated in a paste made of crushed walnuts, pomegranate juice, chopped parsley, olive oil, and crushed garlic.

It is then cooked on skewers over charcoal. Traditionally, it is eaten with kateh (boiled rice) and a vast variety of Gilani side dishes. The most important point for preparing this kebab is to use a type of local vegetable called "chochāgh/chochaagh" (Persian: چوچاغ, a plant like Eryngium planum; but this kind of plant grows only in northern Iran and gives a special taste to Kabab torsh.

== See also ==
- Iranian cuisine
- List of kebabs
