= Reshmi kabab =

Chicken kebab of India and Pakistan

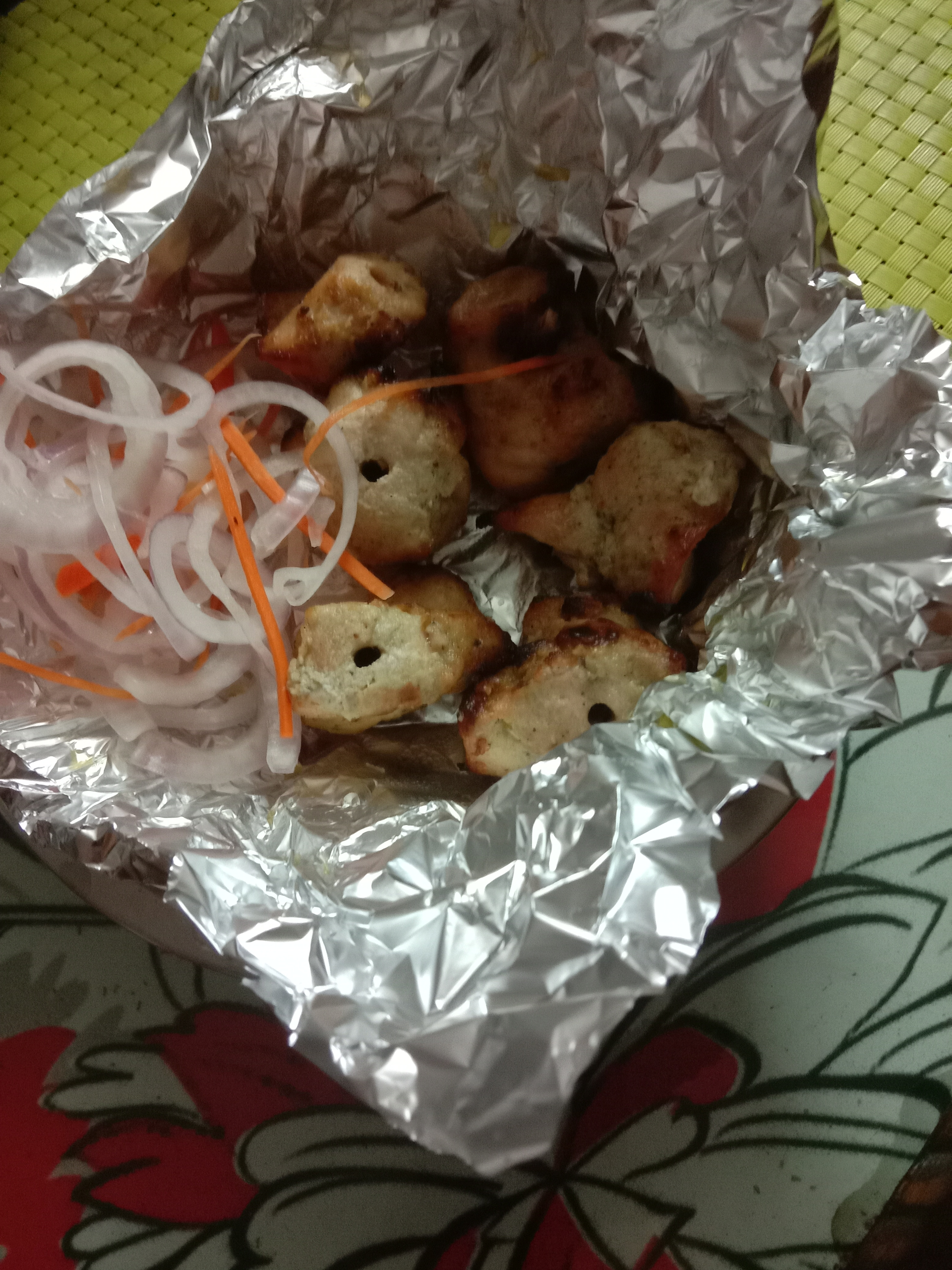
- Reshmi kabab served on foil sheet and accompanied by salads.
- Type: Kebab
- Course: Starters
- Place of origin: Indian subcontinent
- Region or state: Indian Subcontinent
- Associated cuisine: Pakistan, India
- Serving temperature: Hot
- Main ingredients: Chicken
- Ingredients generally used: Cashews, Almonds and Malai
- Variations: Reshmi Malai Kabab

Reshmi kabab is a chicken kebab commonly eaten in India and Pakistan. Made with boneless chicken, it is cooked by marinating chunks of meat in curd, cream, cashew nut paste, spices and then grilled in tandoor.

== Etymology ==
The Hindi-Urdu word 'Reshmi' means 'silk', known for the kabab's smooth texture. Its nickname 'Reshmi Malai Kabab' has an extra word added 'Malai', which means 'creamy' in Hindi-Urdu. The word 'Malai' is also seen in Malai Kofta, another South Asian dish.

== Description ==
Reshmi kababs have a crusty upper layer and a soft interior. Mughal culinary influence can be seen in the use of a lot of cream and cashews.

Reshmi kababs are often served with chutney, particularly mint chutney, and with salads of grated carrots, cucumber, and onions.

The use of curd, cream, cashew nuts, and spices as marinade gives Reshmi kababs their unique taste. The time-span in which it is cooked is considered to be a crucial factor that determines its taste.

== See also ==
- List of kebabs
