= Shish kofta =

Turkish dish of mincemeat kofta grilled on skewers

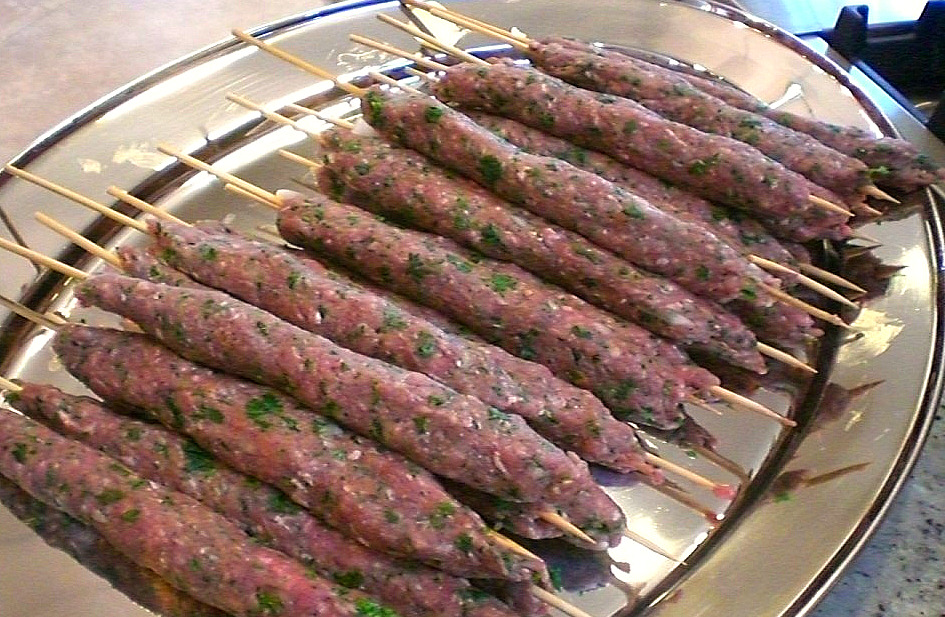
Shish kofta before being grilled

Shish kofta (şiş köfte) (Turkish) is a type of kebab-style kofta dish in Turkish cuisine.

The dish consists of minced lamb, mutton, veal or beef, or a mixture of these meats mixed with herbs, often including parsley and mint, placed on a şiş (skewer) and grilled. It is typically served with pilav (Turkish-style rice or bulgur wheat) and salad.

There are several regional variations on shish kofta. Tire köfte is made mainly with veal.

The city of Burdur is known for its distinct variant of shish kofta known as Burdur şiş, which is traditionally made with minced goat meat (or more commonly with beef today), with salt but no spices or herbs, and eaten with a special type of pita bread. Burdur şiş was officially recognised as a distinct variant of shish kofta by the Turkish Patent and Trademark Office in 2010.

Shish kofta is also the basis of yoğurtlu kebap (kebab with yogurt).

== See also ==
- Ćevapi
- Burdur Şiş
- Kebab
- List of kebabs
- Shish kebab
- Seekh kebab
- Lula kebab
- Kabab koobideh
