= Çöp şiş =

Type of lamb shish kebab

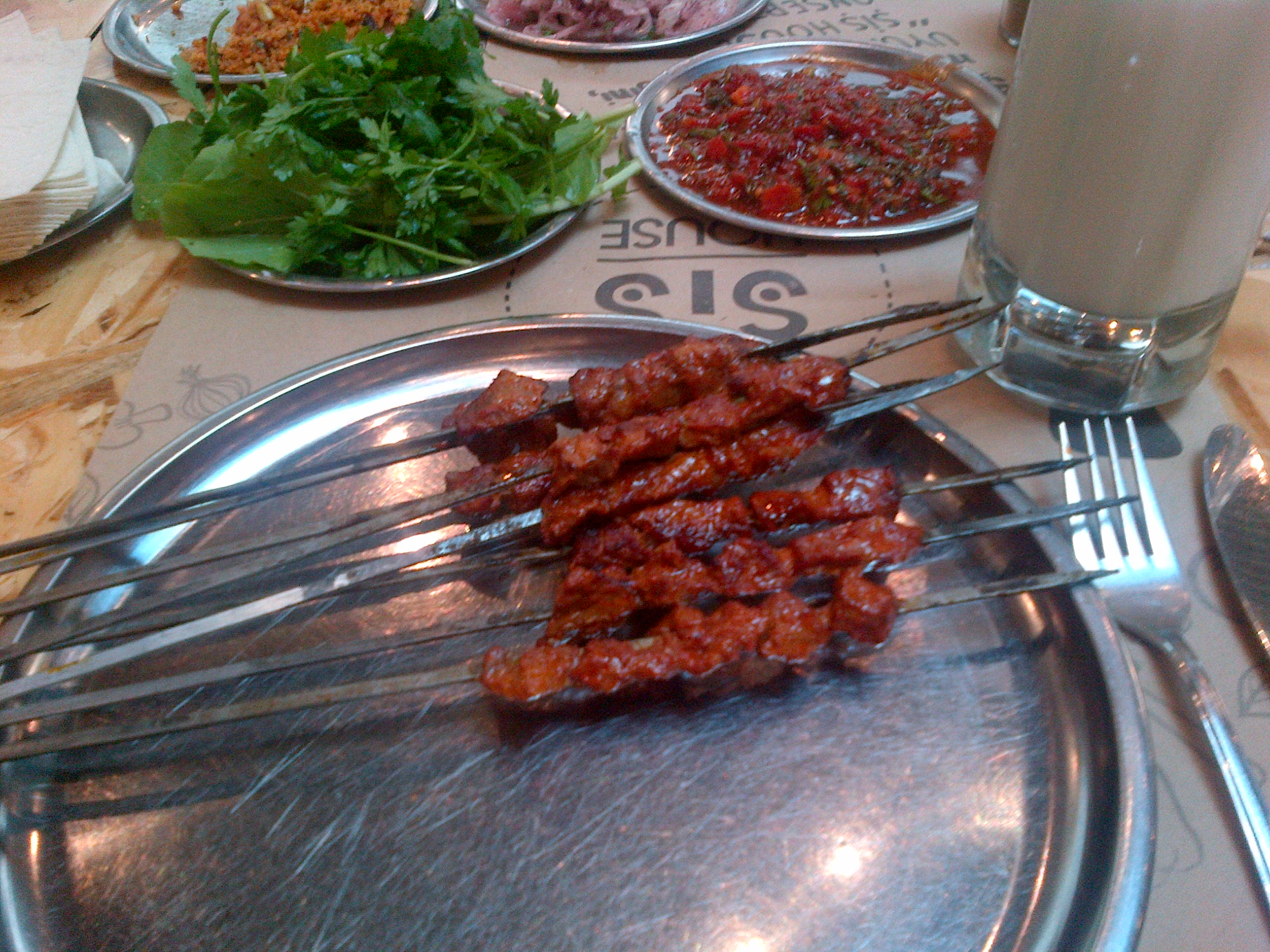
- Çöp şiş on a plate with vegetables.
- Course: Kebab
- Place of origin: Turkey
- Main ingredients: Marinated slices of lamb, fat, onion, green pepper, black pepper and salt.

Çöp şiş (pronounced 'chop shish') is a type of lamb shish kebab eaten throughout Anatolia in Turkey.

The etymology of the name can be explained by çöp, which, among many other things, can refer to a little branch (çöpçatan – matchmaker). Çöp şiş originally referred to a wooden skewer made of a very thin branch.

Çöp şiş is generally cooked on wooden skewers rather than iron ones. During preparation, the lamb meat and pieces of fat are mixed with garlic and tomato and left to marinate with black pepper, oregano and olive oil, before cooking over an ocak, or grill.

It is usually served with grilled peppers and onion, with bread as an option to wrap the lamb and vegetables inside.

== See also ==
- List of kebabs
