= Shami kebab =

Variety of kebab from the Indian subcontinent

Shami kabab
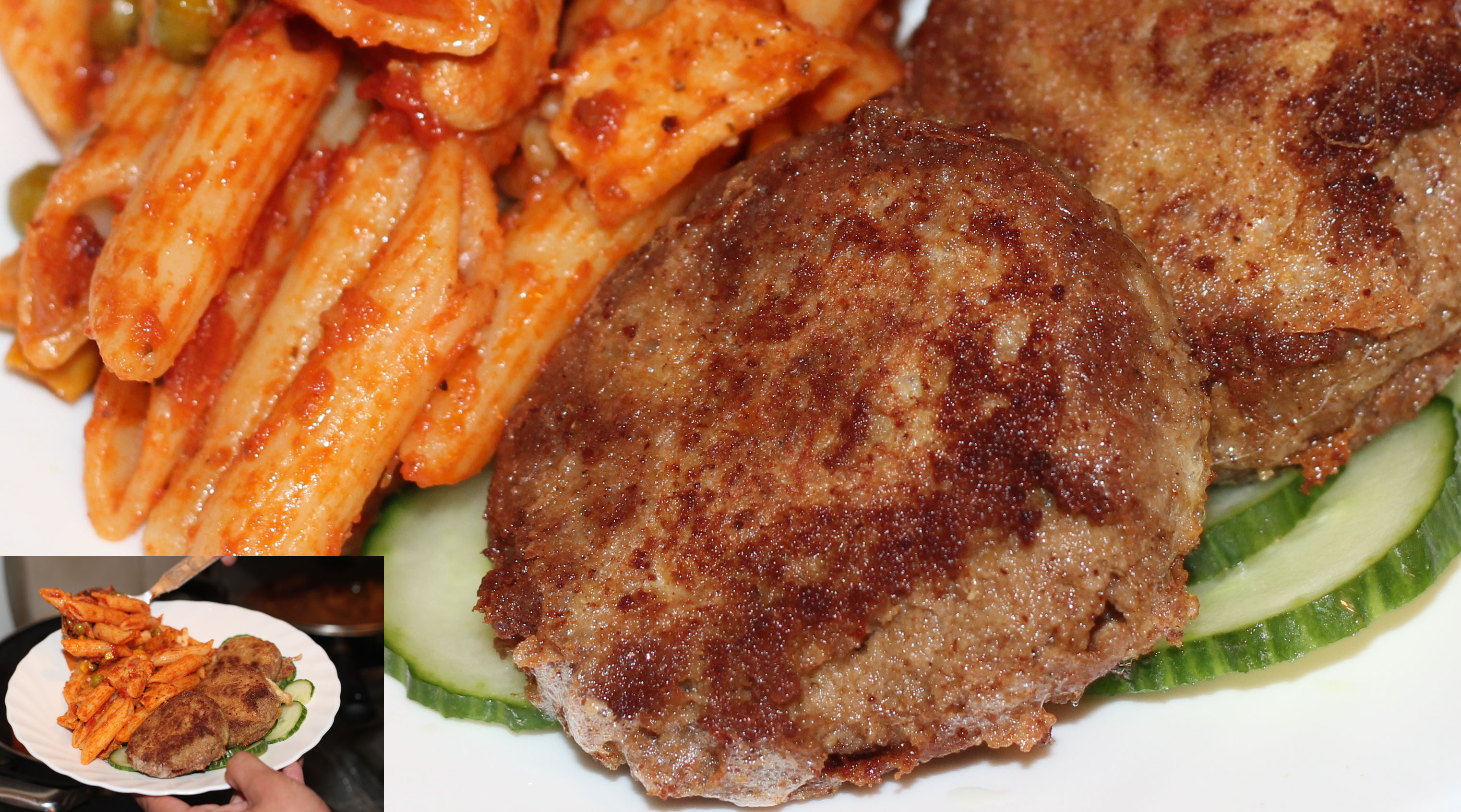
- Shami kebab on a bed of cucumbers, served with pasta
- Region or state: Indian subcontinent
- Main ingredients: Meat or fish and spices
- Variations: Many variations exist
- Food energy (per serving): Vary

Shami kabab or shaami kabab is a South Asian variety of kebab, composed of a shallow fried small patty of minced meat, generally beef, but occasionally lamb or mutton (a chicken version exists as well), with ground chickpeas, egg as binder, and spices. It originates from the Lucknow region of the Indian subcontinent developed during the Mughal rule. It is a popular dish in modern-day Indian, Pakistani and Bangladeshi cuisines. Shami kebab is eaten as a snack or an appetizer, and is served to guests especially in the regions of Bengal, Deccan, Punjab, Kashmir, Uttar Pradesh and Sindh.

They are often garnished with lemon juice and served with sliced raw onions as a side salad, and may be eaten with chutney made from mint or coriander. They are also served along with sheer khurma during the celebrations of the Islamic festival of Eid.

== Preparation ==
Shami kebabs are boiled or sauteed meat (beef or lamb) and chickpeas (chana daal) with whole hot spices (garam masala, black pepper, cinnamon, cloves, bay leaves), whole ginger, whole garlic and some salt to taste until completely tender. Onions, turmeric, chili powder, egg, chopped green coriander, chopped green chillies and chopped mint leaves may be added in preparing kebab. Garam masala powder (ground spices) may be used in place of whole hot spices.

The cooked meat is then ground in such a way that it is fibrous and does not become a paste. It is then shaped into diamond or round patties and is shallow fried. The Kashmiri variation uses a proportion of 3 parts mutton to 1 part lentils (chana) and is cooked and then ground to a paste consistency before frying the patties to a brown outer crust while keeping the inner soft.

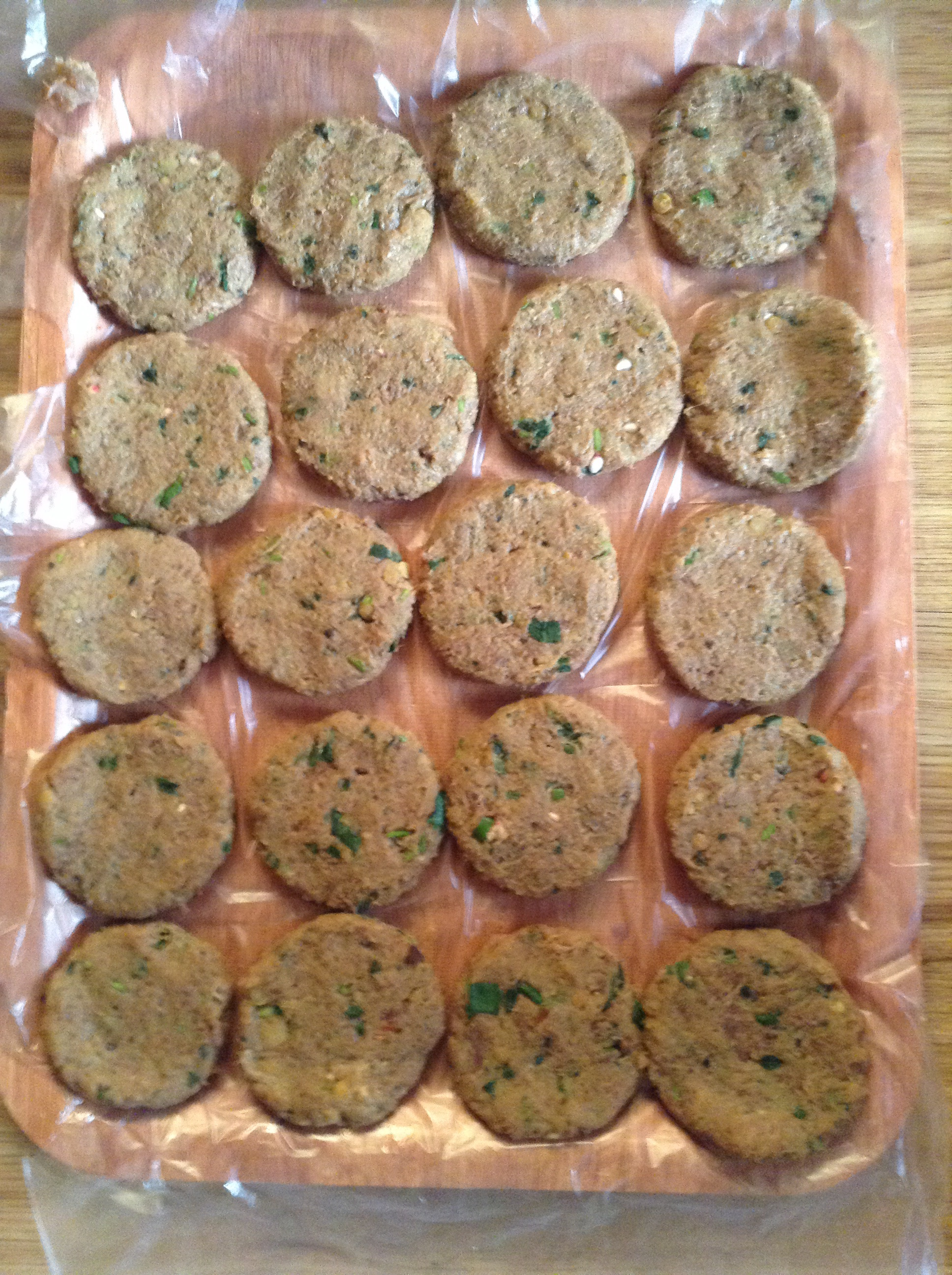
Shami kebab ready for frying

== Serving ==
Shami kebabs may be served with roti along with ketchup, hot sauce, Schezwan sauce, chilli garlic sauce, raita or chutney. Before serving the kebabs, it is also common to dip them in a beaten egg mixture and double-fry them. They are also commonly eaten in Hyderabad with cooked rice.

== Etymology ==
There are several etymological explanations behind the shami kebab. One explanation is that the name of the dish derives from the word shaam, which means "dinner" and "night" in Persian. It also means evening in Urdu. The name may also derive from the scent of an itr called shamama. The name shami kebab may also refer to Bilad al-Sham, the modern Syria, as many cooks from that region migrated to the wealthy Mughal Empire of South Asia during the Middle Ages.

== Iranian shami ==
- Anda shami
- Frikadeller
- List of kebabs
- Pakistani meat dishes
