= Kuzu şiş =

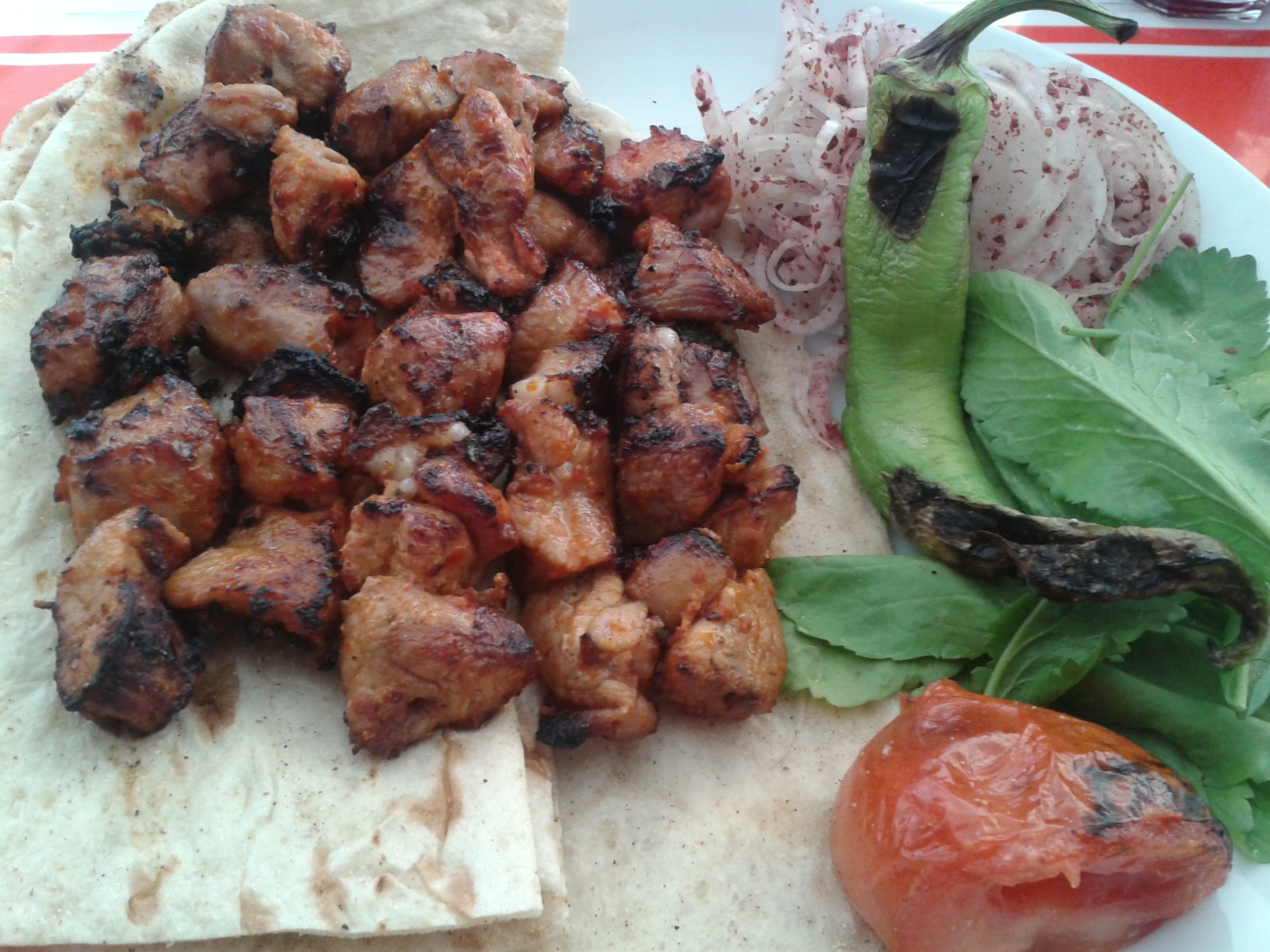
Kuzu şiş on lavaş bread

Kuzu şiş (pronounced 'kuzu shish') is a Turkish lamb kebab made with the thigh of the lamb, and served with onion and tomato garnishes.

A combination of black pepper, ground red pepper, cumin, garlic powder and rosemary is often used to spice the meat. The lamb can also be marinated in milk and oil for up to 48 hours prior to cooking and left in a refrigerator. The cubed lamb is then placed on a skewer and cooked over a charcoal grill to get a smokey flavour. Peppers and tomato can also be cooked on a grill and served as an accompaniment to the meat. Thin lavaş bread is often served with the meat to pick it up and eat it with.

== See also ==
- List of kebabs
