= Cağ kebabı =

Turkish dish

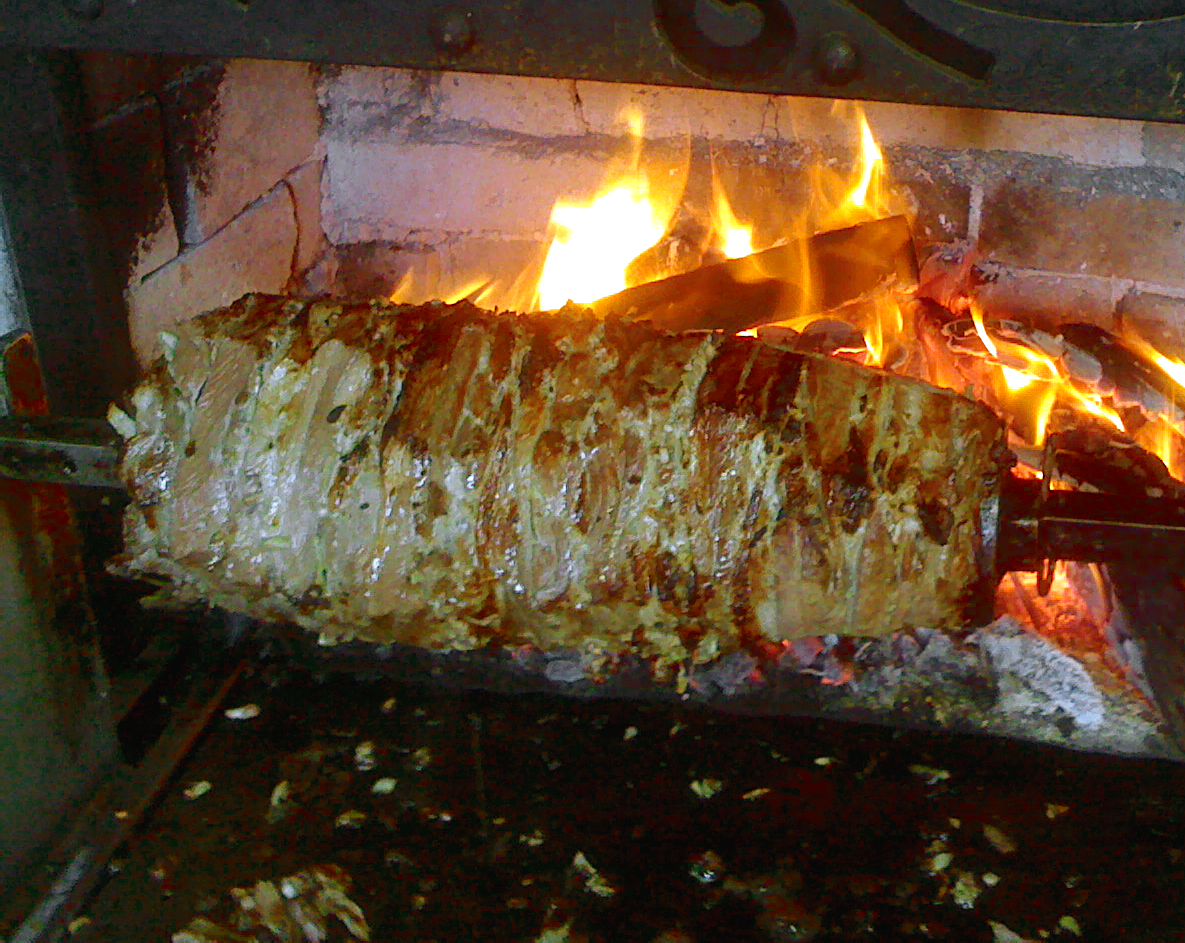
- Cağ kebabı, from Erzurum.
- Course: Kebab
- Place of origin: Ottoman Empire
- Region or state: Erzurum
- Created by: Disputed, with various lawsuits. Goes back to 18th century.
- Main ingredients: Marinated slices of lamb, tail fat, onion, sweet basil, black pepper and salt.

Cağ kebabı (Turkish: [ˈdʒaː ceˈbabɯ]) is a horizontally stacked marinated rotating lamb kebab variety, originating in Erzurum Province, Turkey.

This uniquely prepared kebab has become, as years passed, a trademark of Erzurum. Cağ kebabı was registered and granted a geographical indication as 'Erzurum Oltu Cağ Kebabı' by the Turkish Patent and Trademark Office in 2010.

Note that while it is increasingly available in most Turkish cities, the Cağ kebabı is especially popular in Erzurum, whereas enjoying an ever-growing success in Istanbul and Ankara.

== History and Etymology ==
Ottoman travel books of the eighteenth century cite a kebab cooked on wood fire consisting of a horizontal stack of meat, known as "Cağ Kebabı" in the Eastern Turkish province of Erzurum. Now, the kebab is very famous in Erzurum, Istanbul and many states in the EU.

The Turkish word cağ (IPA: [ˈdʒaː]) is borrowed from Armenian ճաղ čaġ, further from Georgian ჭალი č̣ali. It means "spit" or "skewer". Hence the name of the kebab that consists of meat impaled on a huge spit.

== Preparation ==
Slices of lamb and large quantities of tail fat are left to marinate in a mixture of basil, black pepper, salt and sliced onions for the length of a day. They are then impaled on the spit (Cağ), and stacked thickly. The spit is then locked and transferred to the fire, where there is a fairly complicated device that controls the cooking of the spit. This typically includes a mechanism for turning the meat, another one for raising and lowering it, and also dents on the side to move the stack towards the fire as it gets thinner after servings are repeatedly cut away.

The meat used for Cağ kebabı is exclusively lamb.

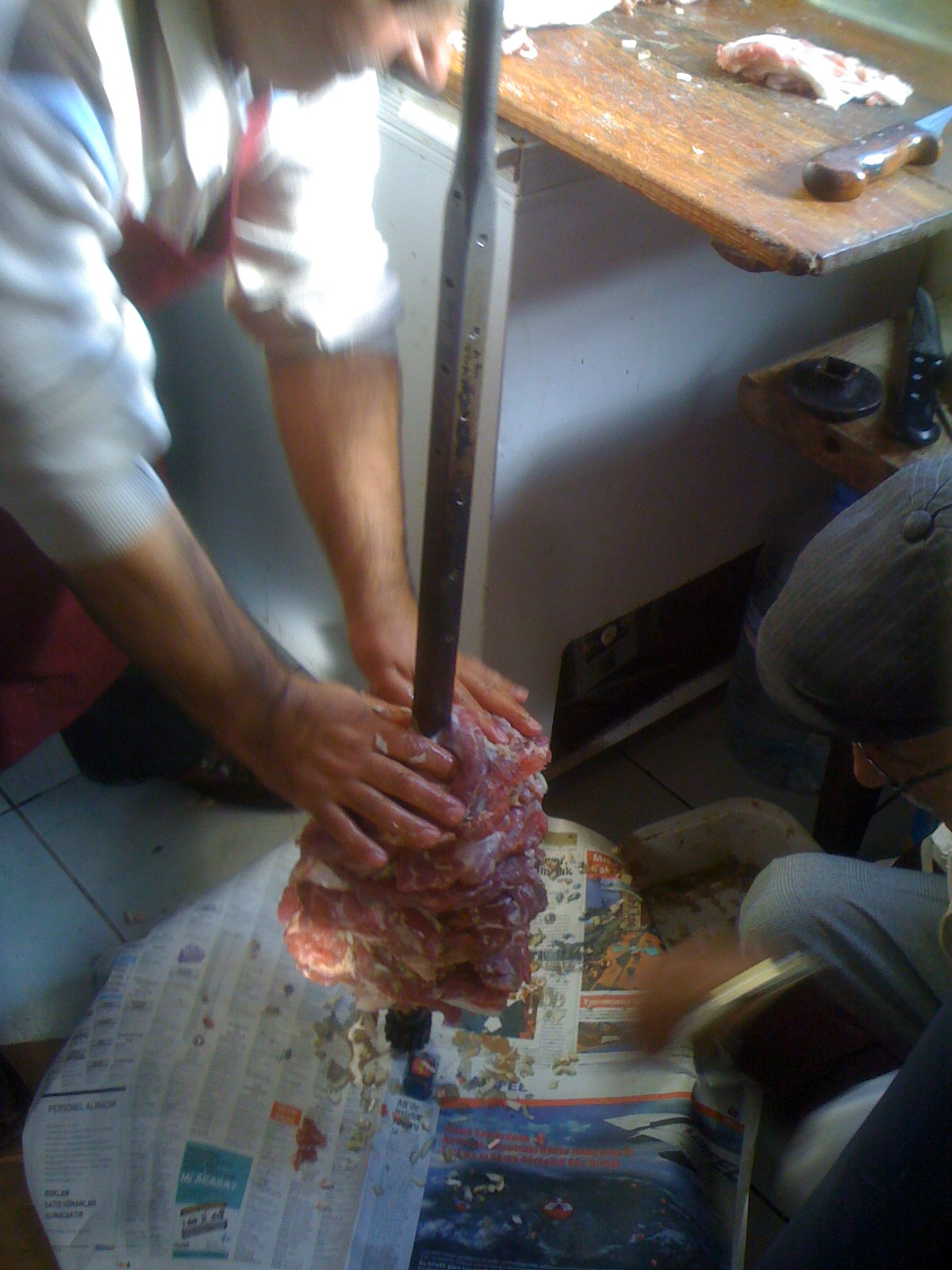
Stacking the lamb slices on the cağ

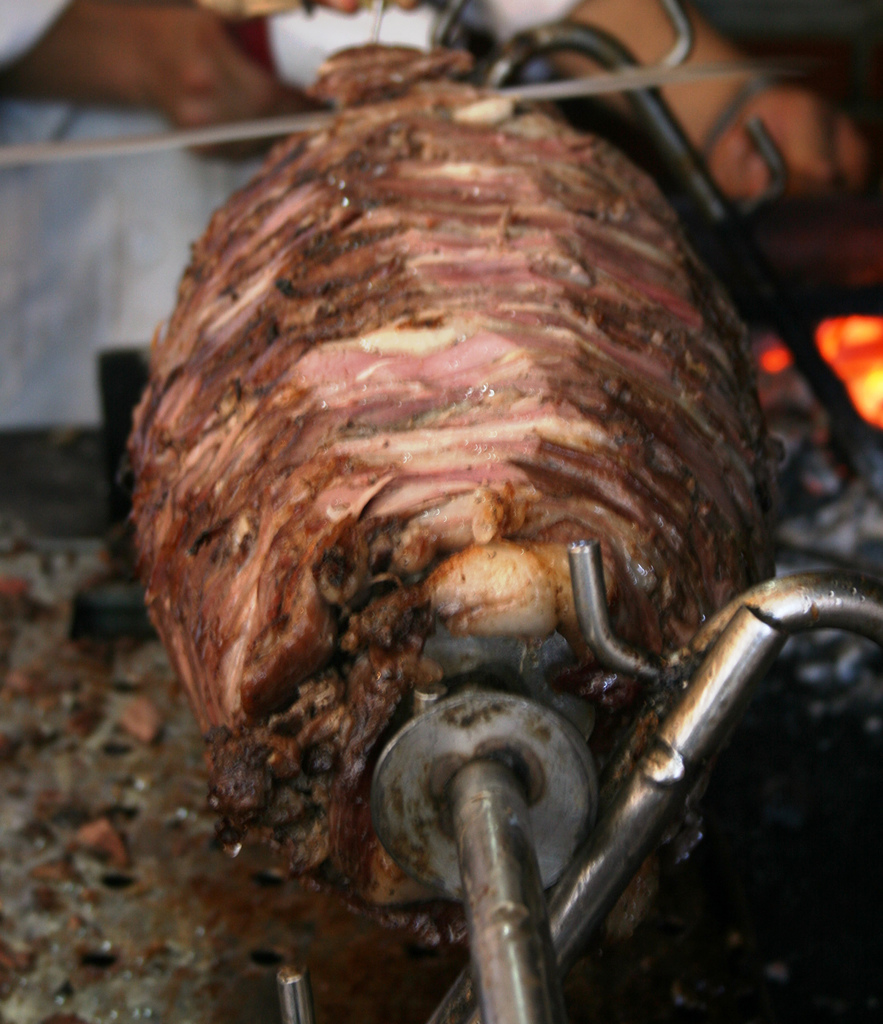
Cağ kebabı being cut

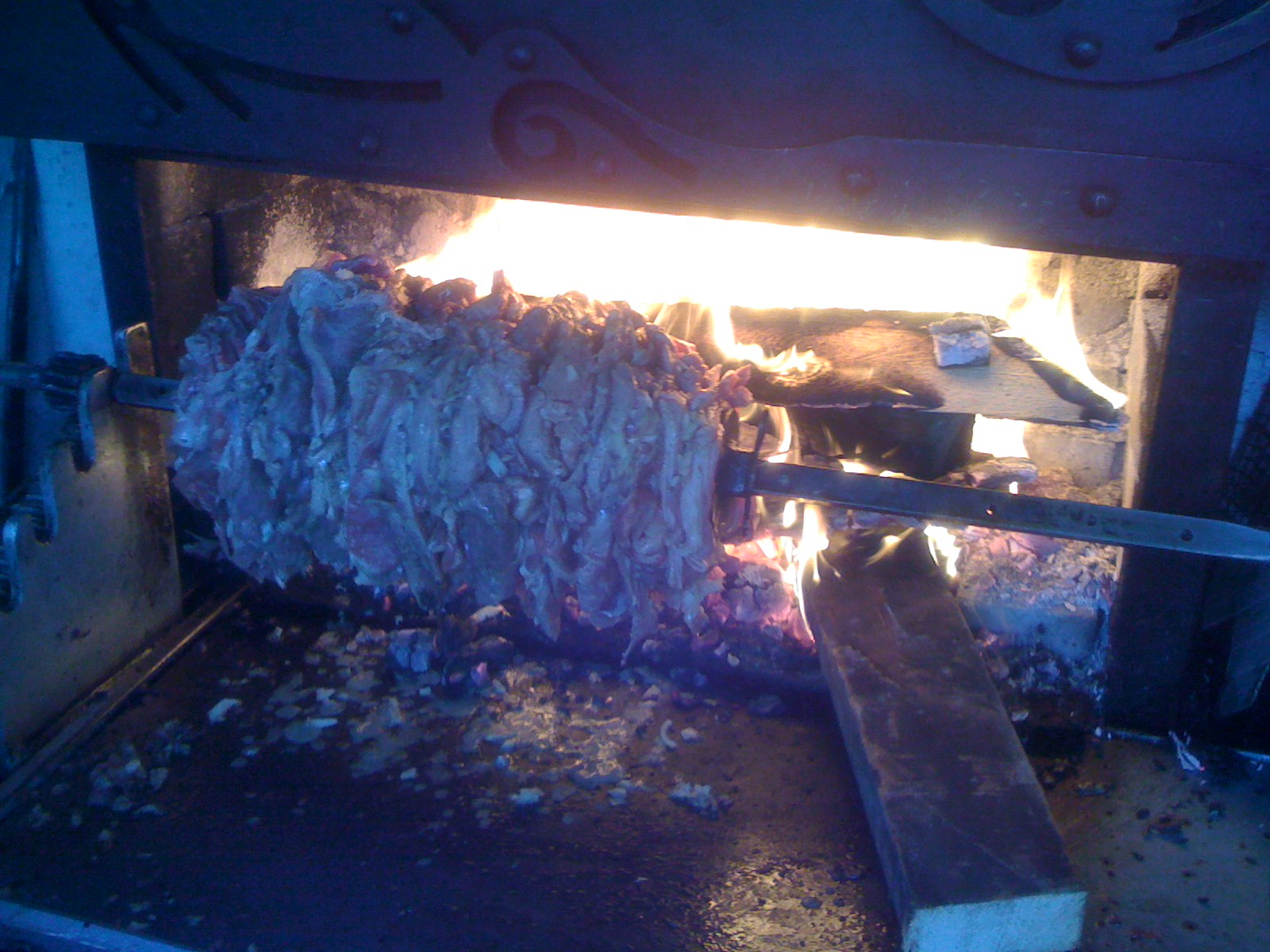
Newly impaled meat cooking on the cağ

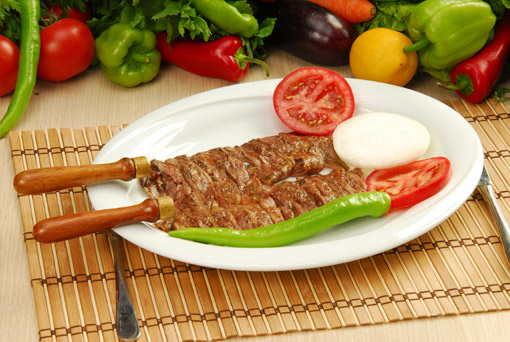
Cağ kebabı, served on a bico, or individual skewer

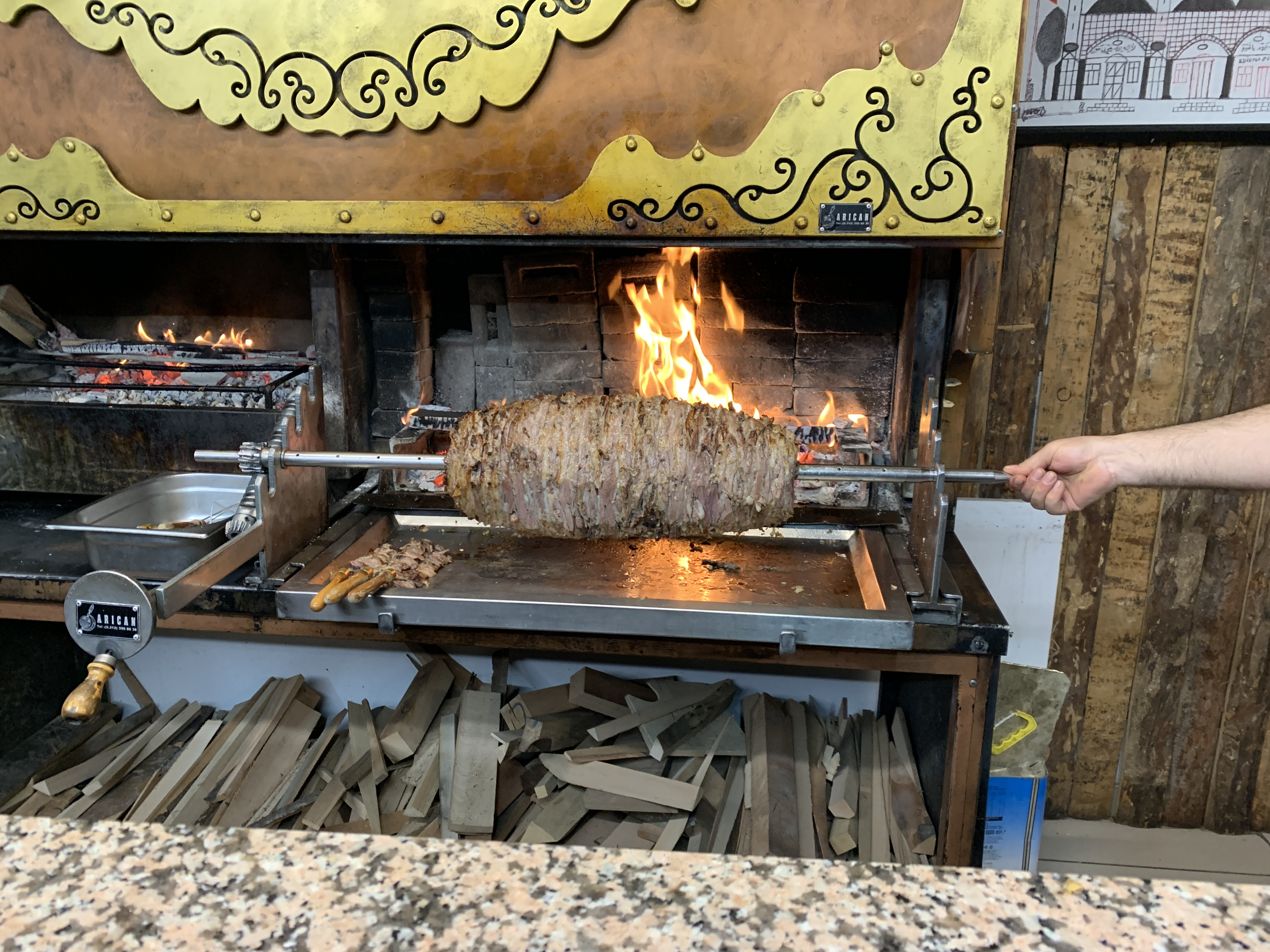
A restaurant in Ankara/Turkey that specializes in Cag Kebab (in Turkish "Cağ kebabı")

== See also ==
- List of kebabs
- List of lamb dishes
- List of spit-roasted foods
- Turkish cuisine
- İzmir kebabı
