= Kağıt kebabı =

Turkish dish

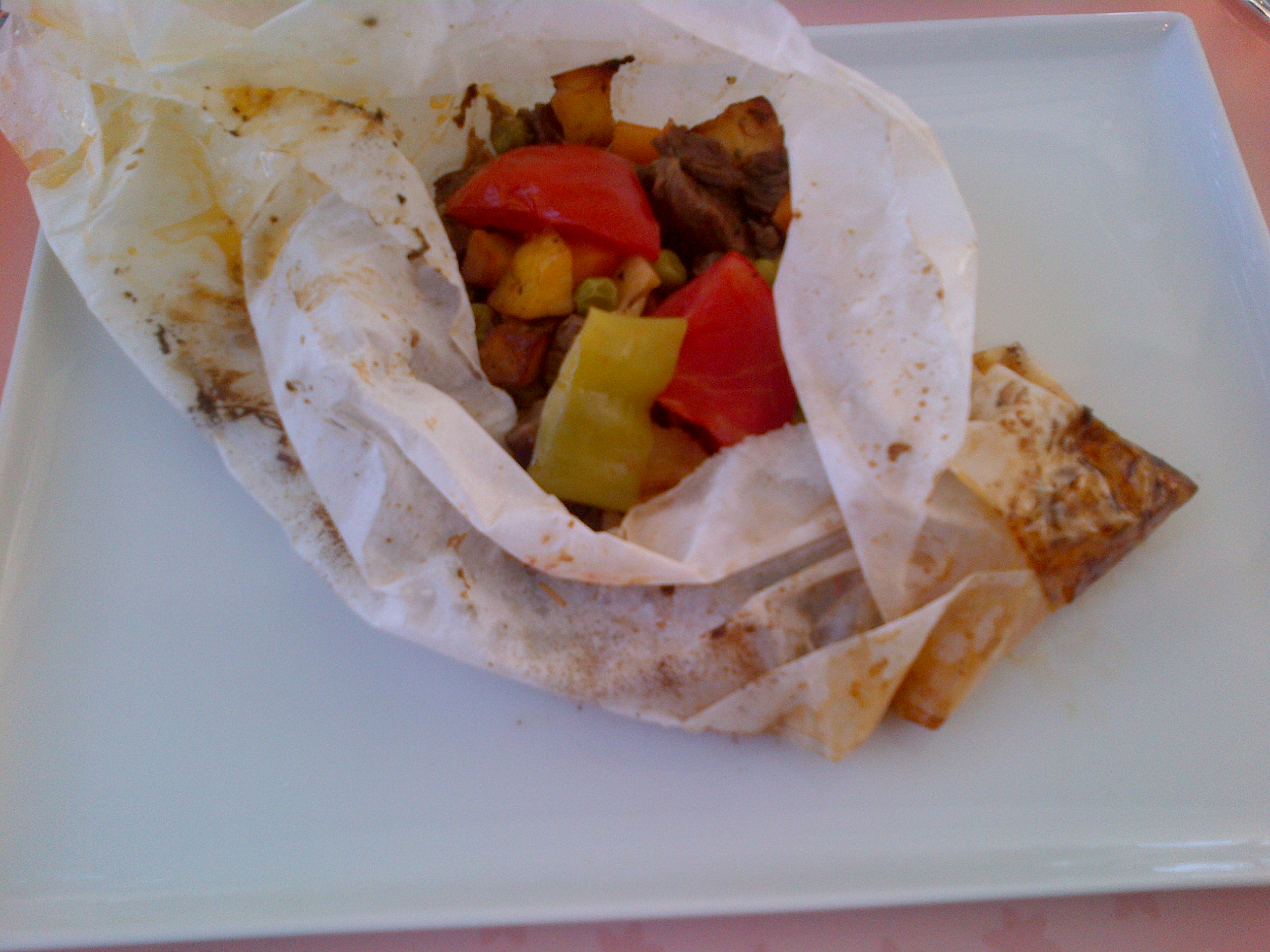
- Kağıt kebab prepared in baking paper
- Course: Kebab
- Place of origin: Turkey
- Region or state: Antakya
- Main ingredients: Tomato, pepper, mincemeat

Kağıt kebabı is a type of Turkish kebab peculiar to Hatay province and its administrative capital Antakya.

Kağıt kebabı is made from tomatoes, peppers, minced meat and spices. It is made using baking paper (kağıt) in an oven to trap the juices and flavours inside.

== See also ==
- List of kebabs
