= Beyti kebab =

Turkish meat dish

- Place of origin: Turkey

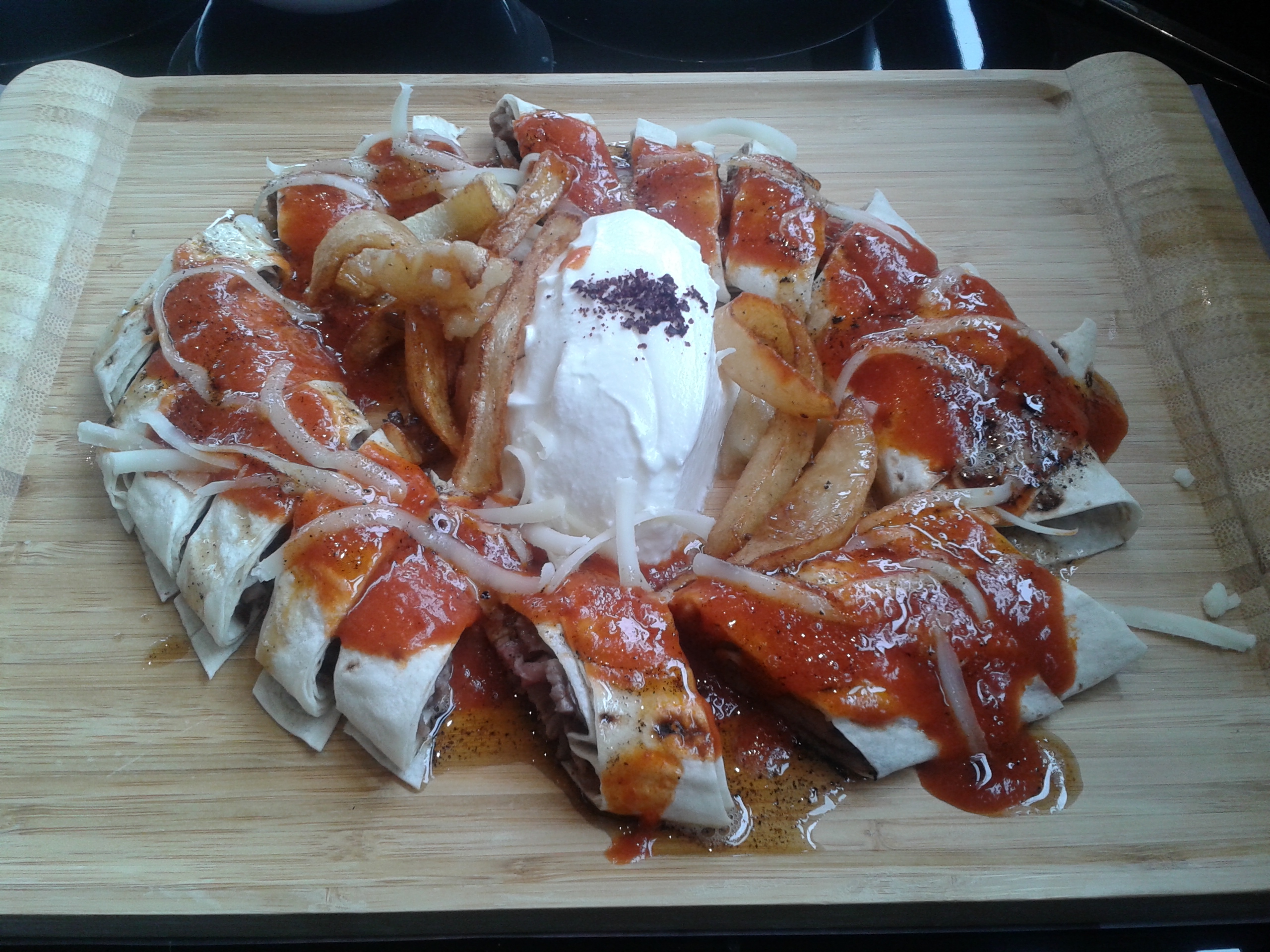
A plate of beyti kebab from Ankara

Beyti is a Turkish dish consisting of ground beef or lamb, grilled on a skewer and served wrapped in lavash and topped with tomato sauce and yogurt.

The dish is named after Beyti Güler, the owner of the popular restaurant Beyti in Istanbul. He was inspired to create his own dish in 1961, after witnessing Swiss butcher Möller's method of preparing meat, when he was visiting Switzerland. His version consists of lamb fillets which are wrapped in strips of cutlet fat and grilled. The dish of ground meat commonly sold as a more affordable version of it in kebab restaurants under this name, bears little resemblance to its original.

== See also ==
- List of lamb dishes
- List of kebabs
