= Lula kebab =

Persian Skewered ground meat dish popular in the South Caucasus

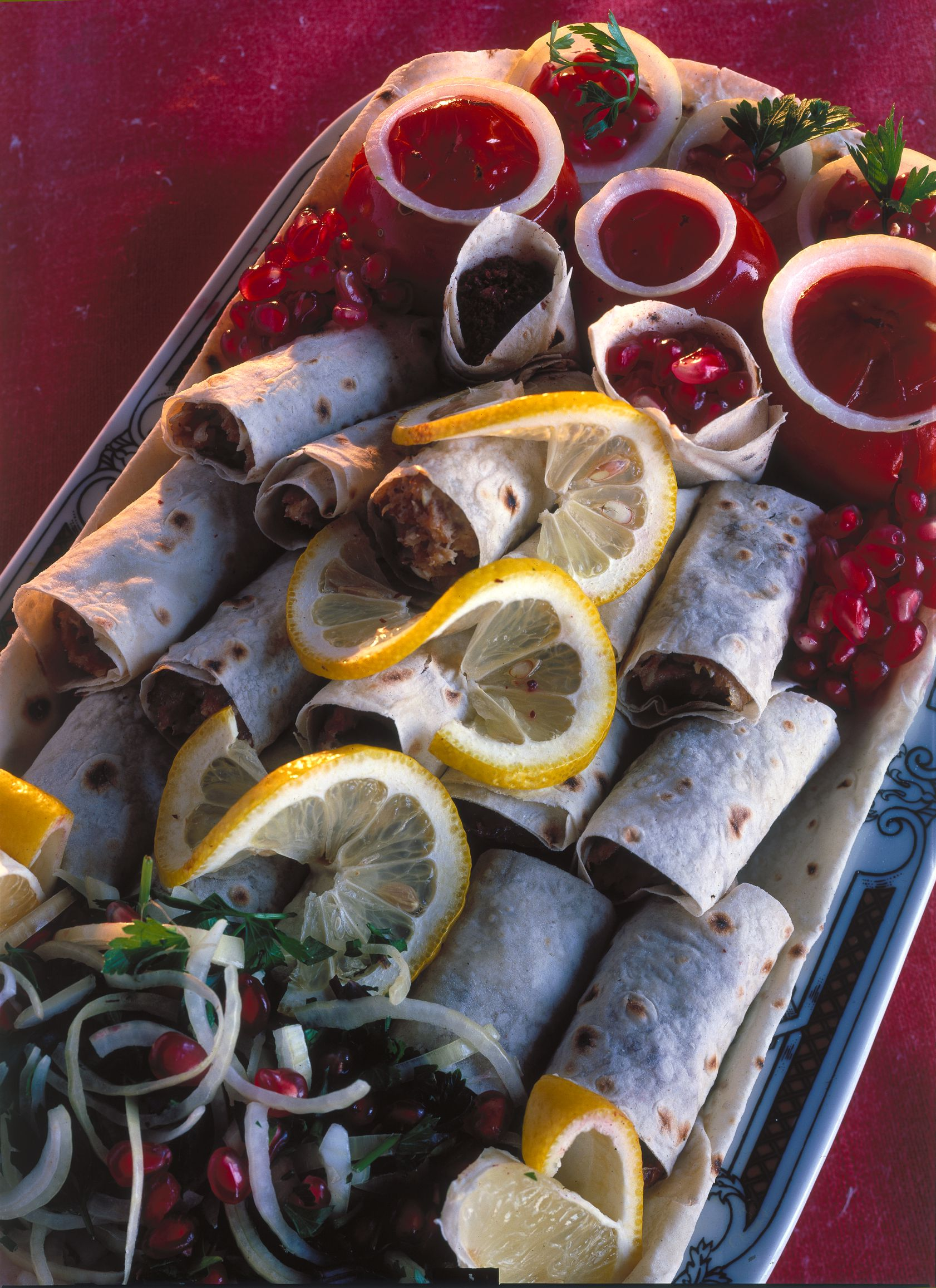
- Lula kebab served in lavash, and with fried tomatoes, pomegranate grains, onion and lemon pieces.
- Alternative names: Lule kebab
- Course: Main course
- Region or state: Iran, South Caucasus
- Serving temperature: Hot
- Main ingredients: Lamb and mutton, onion

Lula kebab (Armenian: լուլա քյաբաբ, romanized: lula kʿyabab; Azerbaijani: lülə kabab) is a type of kebab cooked on skewers. It is made from minced meat. The name 'Lula' derives from Persian and it means 'barrel.' It is a specialty of Armenian, and Azerbaijani cuisine.

== Ingredients ==
- Mutton (or minced sheep and beef meat by 50:50)
- Onion
- Sheep tail fat
- Salt
- Pepper
- Sumac (optional)
- Lavash (optional)

== Preparation ==
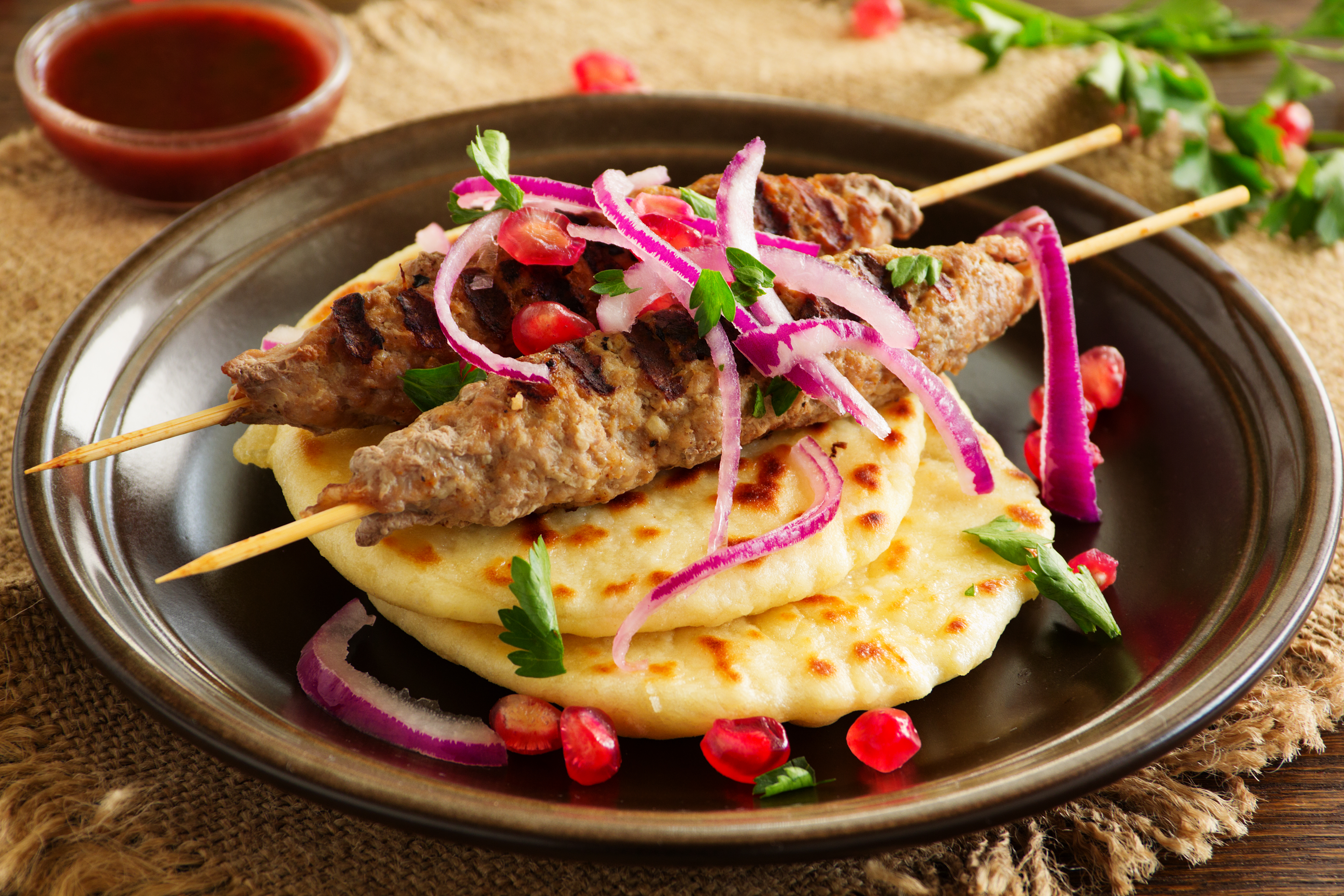
Lula kebab

The soft portion of the mutton is ground with onion using a meat grinder and mixed with pepper and salt. There should be 400 grams of onion in per 1 kilogram of minced meat. This ratio is followed to make it stay on the skewer. The meat mash is mixed well and stored in the refrigerator for an hour. Later the mince is extracted from the refrigerator and is mixed well. The mince is wrapped around the skewer. The mince gets slightly long form on a slightly wide skewer. Then it gets fried on coal barbecue, called a mangal. It's cooked for 10-15 minutes. The kebab is served between the lavash. Sprinkling sumac on it is optional.

== See also ==
- Adana kebab
- Kabab koobideh
- Şiş köfte
- List of kebabs
