= Alinazik kebab =

Turkish dish of Gaziantep province

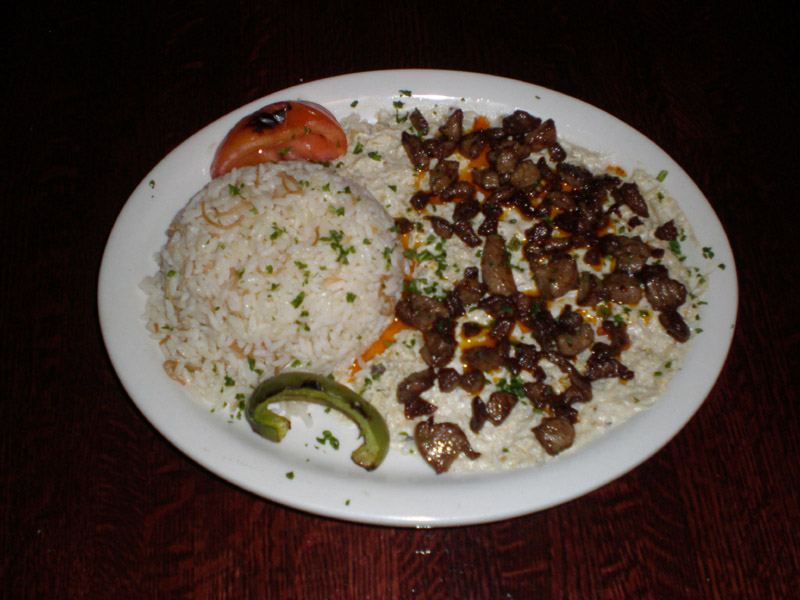
- Alinazik over garlic-eggplant puree with vermicelli rice pilaf, grilled tomato and green bell pepper
- Alternative names: Alinazik
- Place of origin: Turkey
- Region or state: Gaziantep
- Main ingredients: Eggplant, lamb

Alinazik kebab, or simply Ali Nazik, is a home-style Turkish dish which is a specialty of the Gaziantep province of Turkey. It is made from smoked and spiced eggplant/Aubergine grilled and then pureed, topped with cubes of sauteed lamb, previously seasoned and marinated. It is usually served with rice pilaf or yogurt with garlic, grilled vegetables, and melted butter.

== See also ==
- Kebab
- List of kebabs
- List of lamb dishes
- List of smoked foods
