= Çökertme kebabı =

Type of kebab

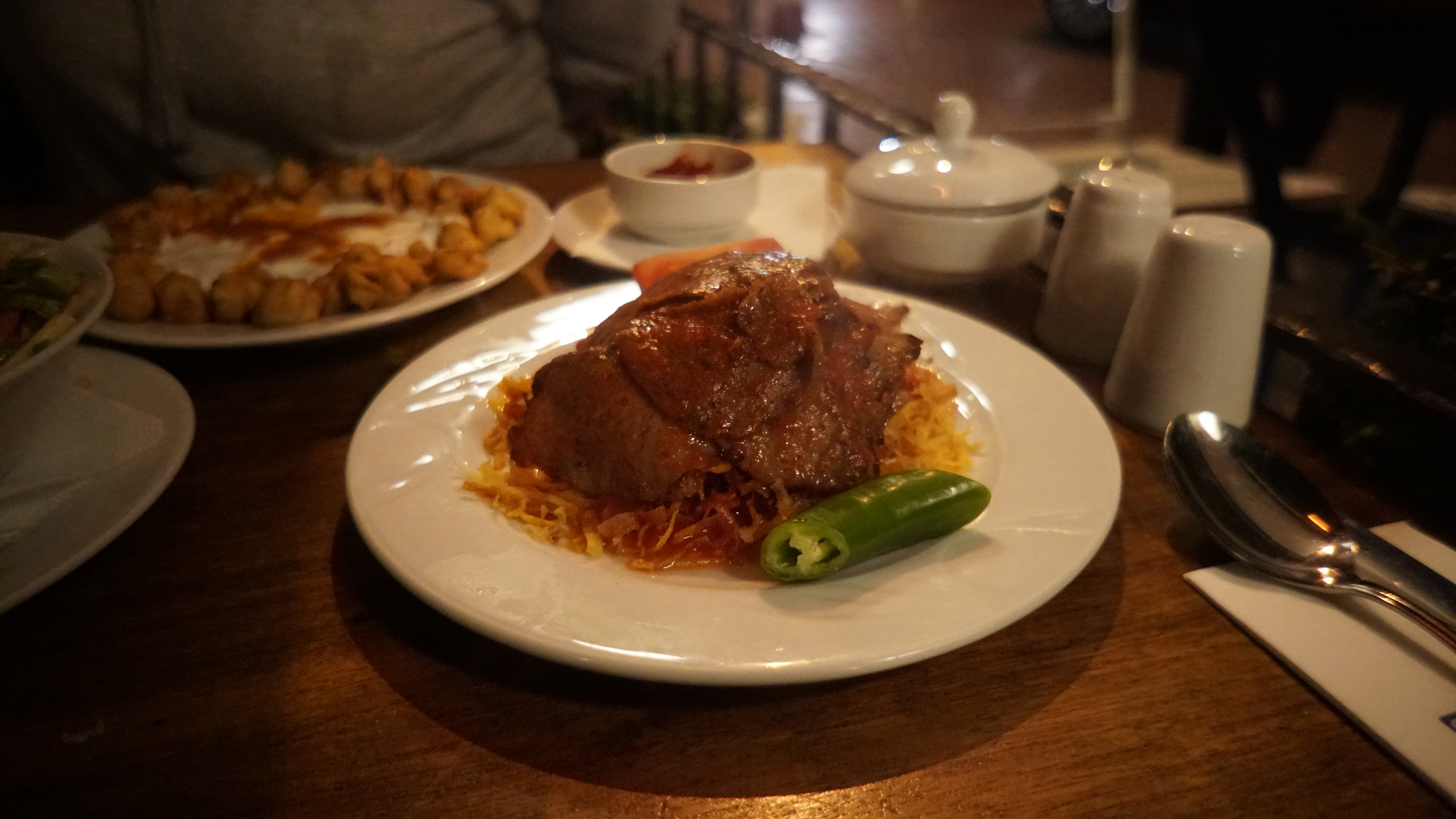
- Çökertme kebabı.
- Course: Kebab
- Place of origin: Turkey
- Main ingredients: Marinated slices of beef, tomato sauce, green pepper, fried potato.

Çökertme kebabı (pronounced 'Ch'kertme kebab') is a type of kebab eaten in Anatolia, and associated particularly with the Bodrum area of South West Turkey.

Çökertme kebab is made using marinated strips of veal with served with fried potatoes, garlic yoghurt, tomato sauce and served with fried tomatoes and green peppers.

Çökertme kebab is a particular speciality of the district of Bodrum and the province of Muğla more generally.

Çökertme is a village in the Milas district of Muğla province, from where the kebab may have originated.

== See also ==
- List of kebabs
