= Bun kebab =

Sandwich originating in Pakistan

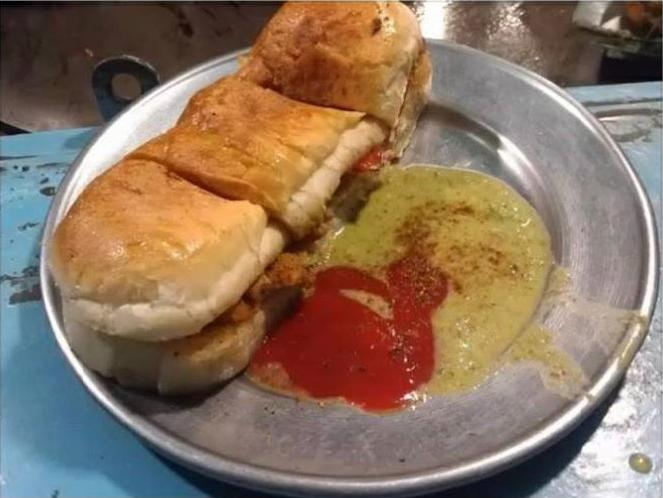
- A typical bun kebab with ketchup and chutney
- Course: Main course
- Place of origin: Karachi, Pakistan
- Region or state: South Asia
- Associated cuisine: Pakistani
- Serving temperature: Hot
- Main ingredients: Buns, shami kebab, eggs, vegetables

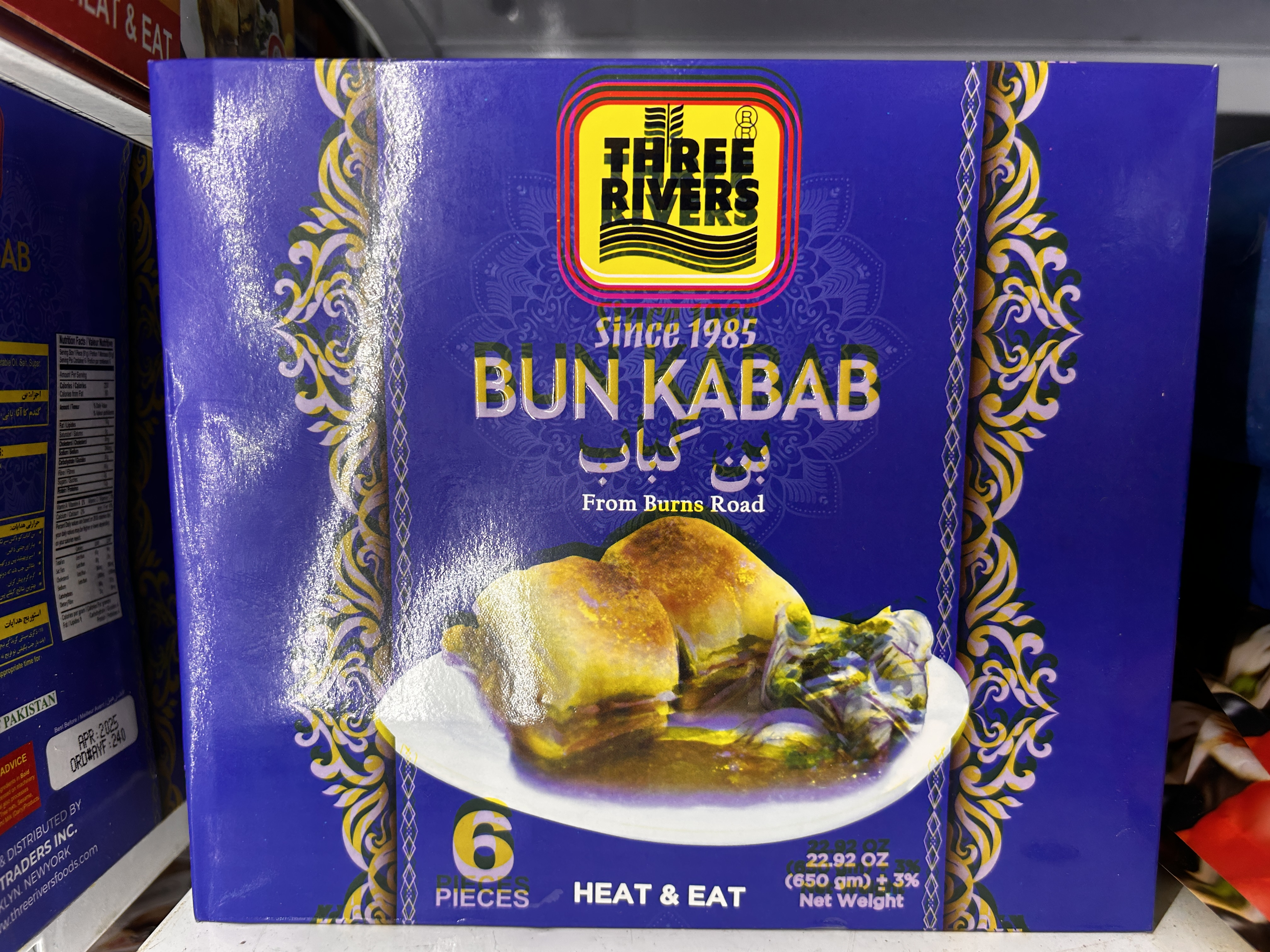
Burns Road style Bun Kebab on sale in Jackson Heights, Queens

Bun kebab (also spelled bun kabab) (Urdu: بَن کباب) or anda shami (Urdu: انڈا شامی) is a sandwich that originated in Pakistan, but is now popular throughout South Asia. Bun kebabs are a signature in Pakistani metro cities like Karachi and Lahore, but they can be found all over Pakistan. Bun kebab vendors are scattered all across Karachi, vendors on Burns Road being particularly famous, and imitated by frozen bun kebabs sold in South Asian supermarkets across the world. In India, it is eaten as a regular street food, specifically in the Indian cities of Bhopal, Lucknow, and Hyderabad. It is especially popular with Indian Muslims; the dish is eaten late at night during Ramadan. Bun kebabs are usually sold at roadside stalls, side street vendors, and fast food restaurants. They are also commonly known as "anday wala burger" (egg burger). A ‘fried’ version of the bun kebab is popular in Lahore; it's known as a ‘bun plaster’ due to the copious amounts of butter and super tender or paste-like kebab mixture used in it. Bun kebabs are usually eaten as a main course or snack.

== History ==
The origins of the bun kebab trace back to Karachi during the 1950s; however, its exact inception is debated. Some claim that Haji Abdul Razzak introduced the sandwich as a quick meal for workers in 1953. Another claim is that the bun kebab evolved from the vada pav, a fast food style sandwich native to the Indian city of Mumbai. A third view is that it was first found outside the Khayam Cinema as a food made primarily for moviegoers.

After the initial emergence of the bun kebab, new patty variations rose to popularity, including dal patties and shami kebabs.

== Ingredients ==
A bun kebab consists of a shallow-fried spicy patty called a shami kebab, onions, and chutney and/or raita in a grilled bun. The chutney is made up from tamarind (imli), salt, cumin powder, and whole red chillies.

Bun kebab patties are typically composed of ground beef or mutton, ground lentils, powdered cumin seeds, and an egg batter. Although they can be vegetarian, the patties are fried in ghee or oil. A bun kebab can also be served with a fried egg or omelette and topped with tomatoes, cucumbers, or onions.

== Variations ==
The patty, shami kebab, can be made of chicken, beef, mutton, potato (aloo wala), egg (anday wala), or lentil (daal). The beef and egg recipe is the most popular, especially among street vendors.

== See also ==
- Pakistani cuisine
- Karachi cuisine
- Indian cuisine
- Awadhi cuisine
- Fast food
- Kebab
- List of sandwiches
- List of buns
- Shami Kebab
- Vada pav
