= Beyti (Istanbul) =

- Location of Beyti Restaurant in Istanbul

Restaurant information
- Established: 1945
- Owner: Beyti Güler
- Food type: Kebabs
- Location: Şenlikköy Mah., Orman Sokak 8, Bakırköy, Istanbul, Turkey
- Coordinates: 40.97349°N 28.79390°E
- Website: www.beyti.com

Beyti is a restaurant in Istanbul, Turkey specialising in roasted meat. It was founded in 1945 in Küçükçekmece and since 1983 has been situated in Florya. The establishment is owned by the restaurateur Beyti Güler and run by him together with his sons Cüneyt and Ahmet.

The main dining room, with a total capacity of 500 seats, offers traditional Turkish cuisine and various kebabs grilled over oak charcoal. Beyti kebab, a specialty named after the chef, is the most popular.

Beyti is a member of the prestigious international gastronomic organization Confrérie de la Chaîne des Rôtisseurs.

== Background ==
Beyti Güler is a descendant of Turkic people who fled from Samarkand to Crimea in the 1720s after the assault of Persians. In the 1870s, following the Crimean War the family moved to Dobruja in Romania. The family immigrated in 1935 to Turkey. In 1945, Beyti and his father opened a small roadside meat restaurant measuring 30 m^{2} with four tables in the suburbs of Istanbul. The restaurant, though it only had 20 seats, became a popular venue and gained fame soon after opening. Notable journalists, top executives and even high-ranked politicians came to taste the döner kebap that was rarely available elsewhere.

An article published in 1965 in the New York Herald Tribune led to international fame. From 1966 to 1974, the restaurant catered daily to four Pan Am airliners. The restaurant served U.S. President Richard Nixon aboard Air Force One during his first official trip to Europe, an opportunity that helped the Turkish kebap become renowned.

To meet the growing demand, Beyti Güler erected a three-story building in Florya, an upscale residential neighborhood close to Atatürk International Airport. Consisting of eleven dining rooms of various sizes plus a terrace, the building was designed in a modern architectural style by Osman Yılmaz Şanlı. The interior decoration was inspired by Ottoman Turkish art. Construction was begun in 1979 and the new site opened by 1983.

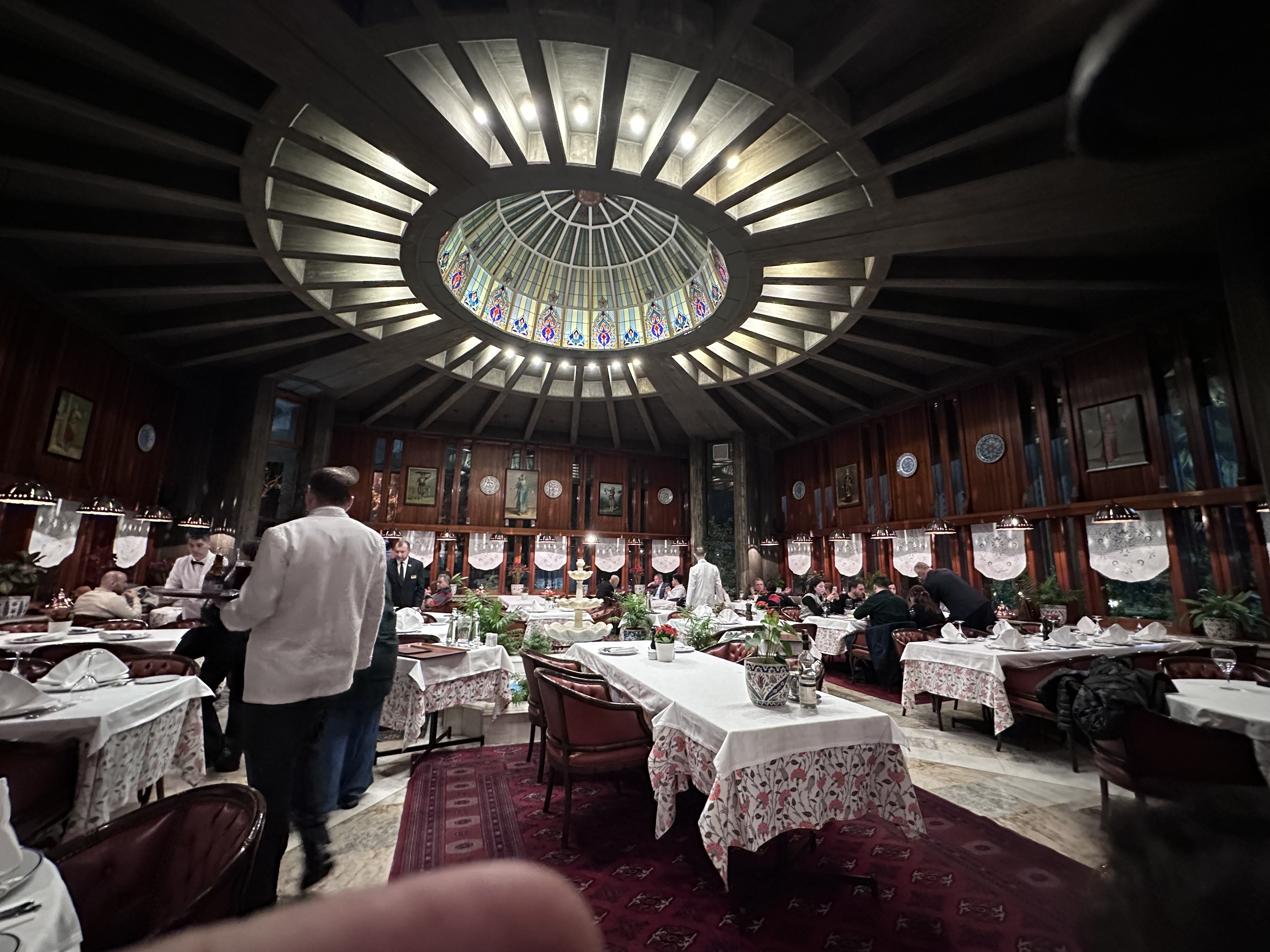

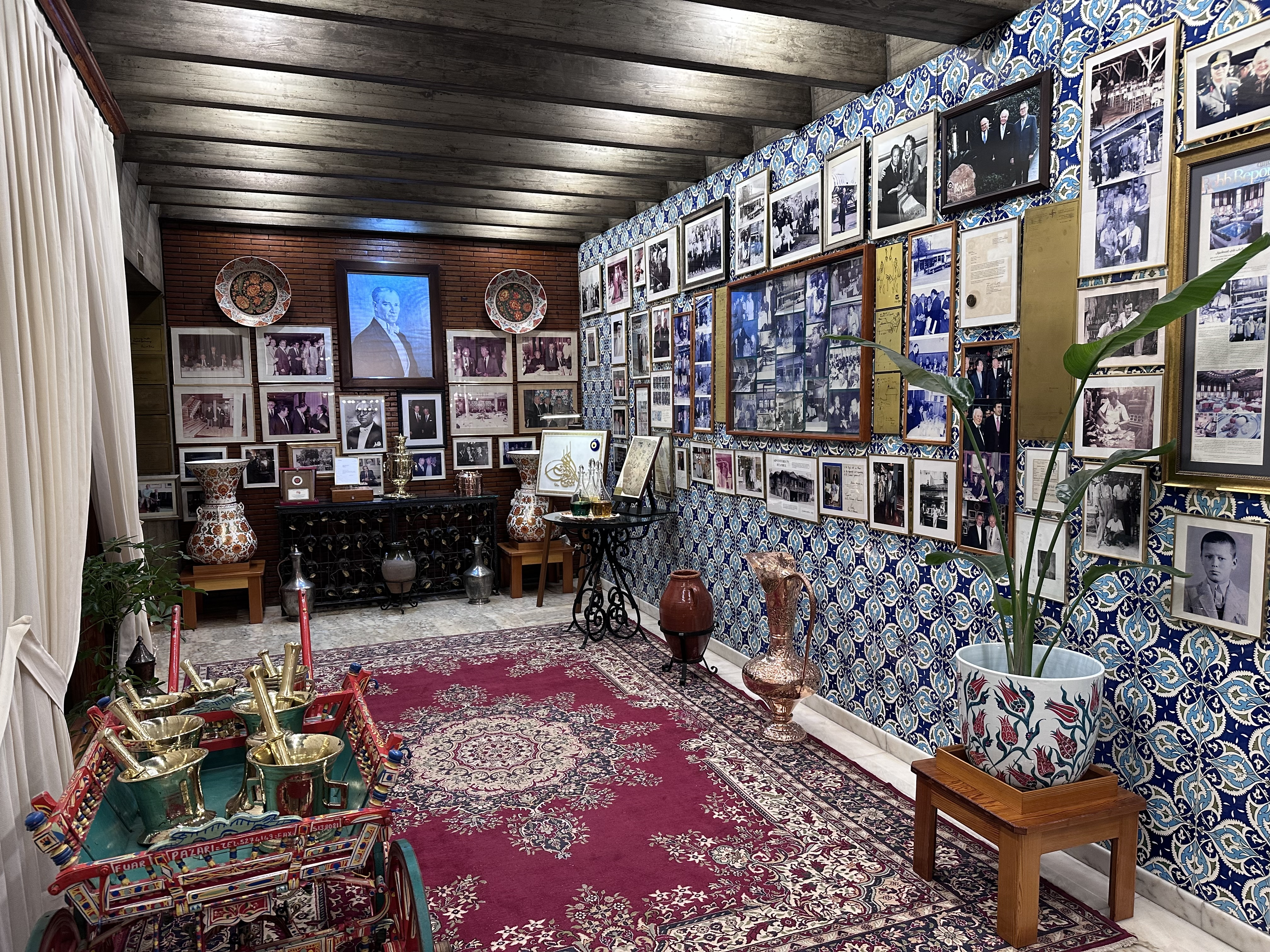

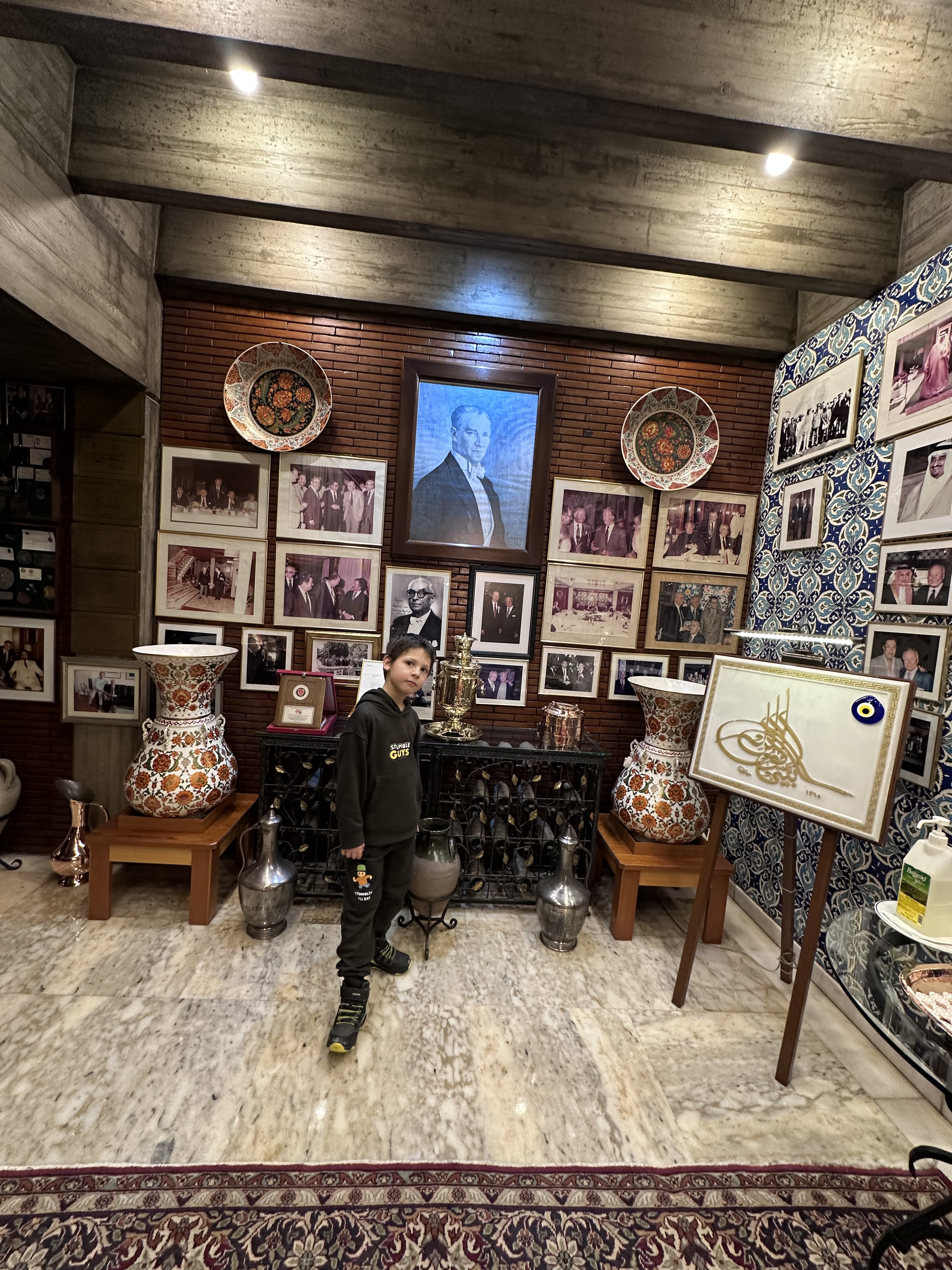

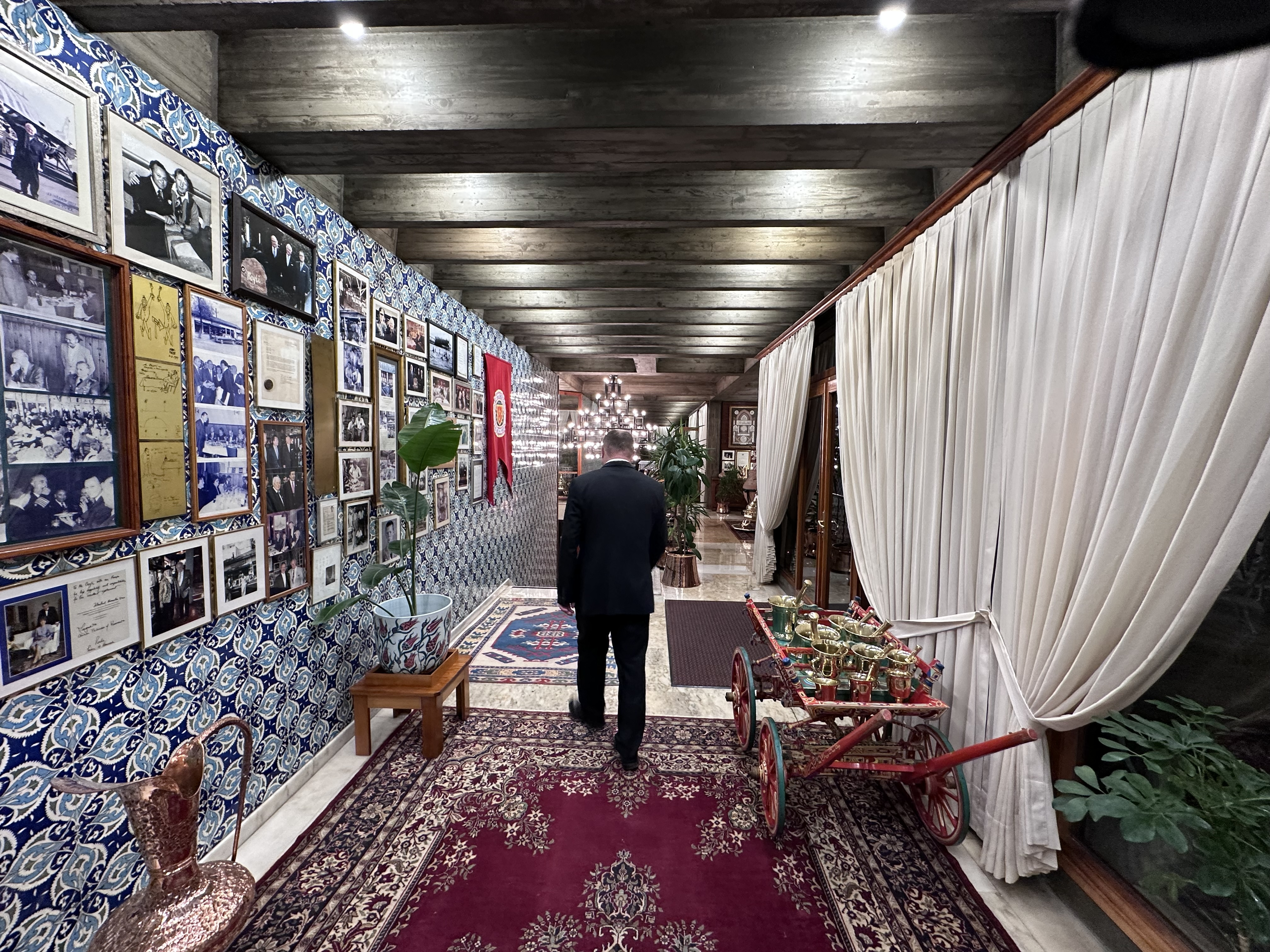

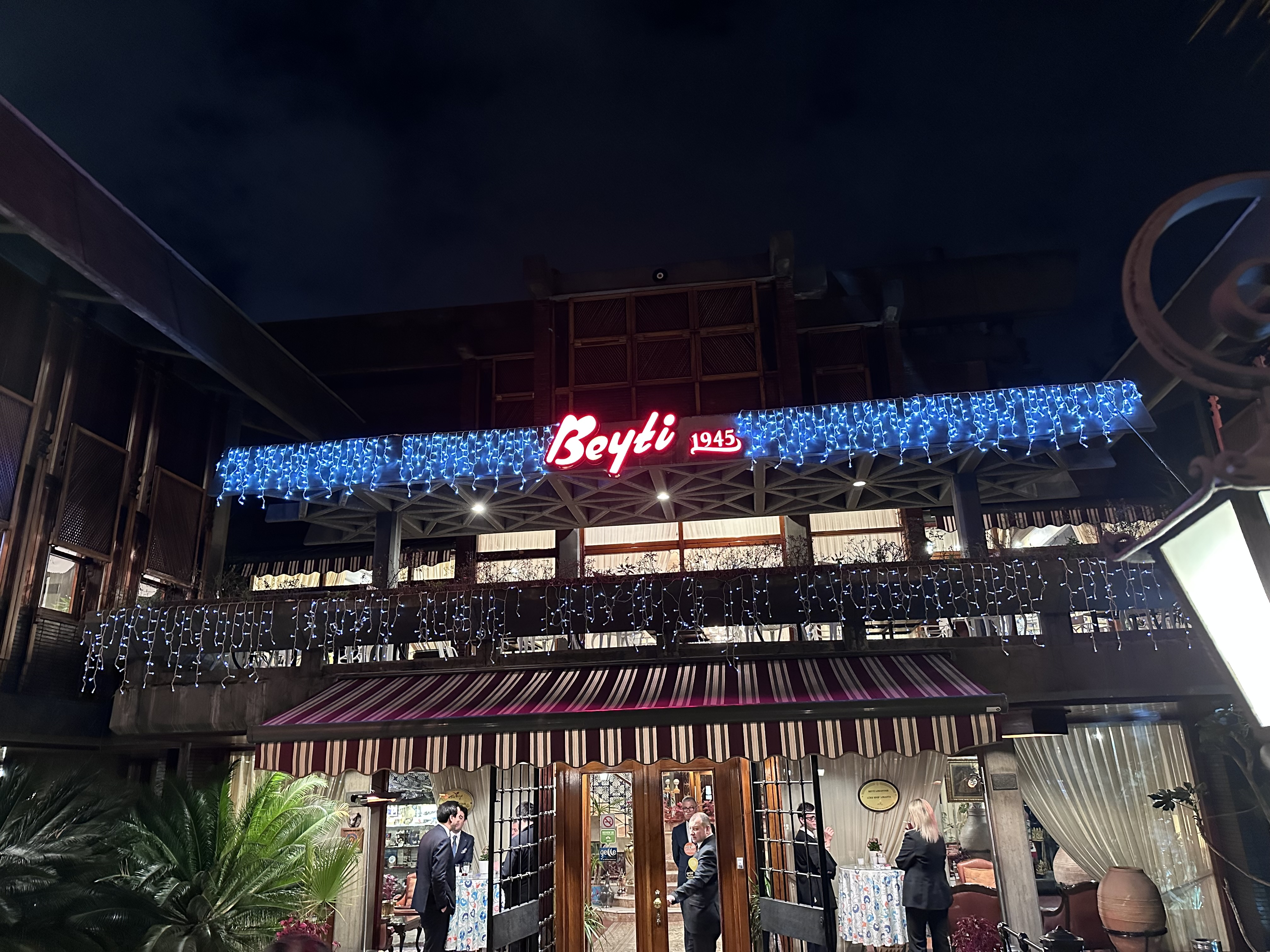

== Beyti kebab ==
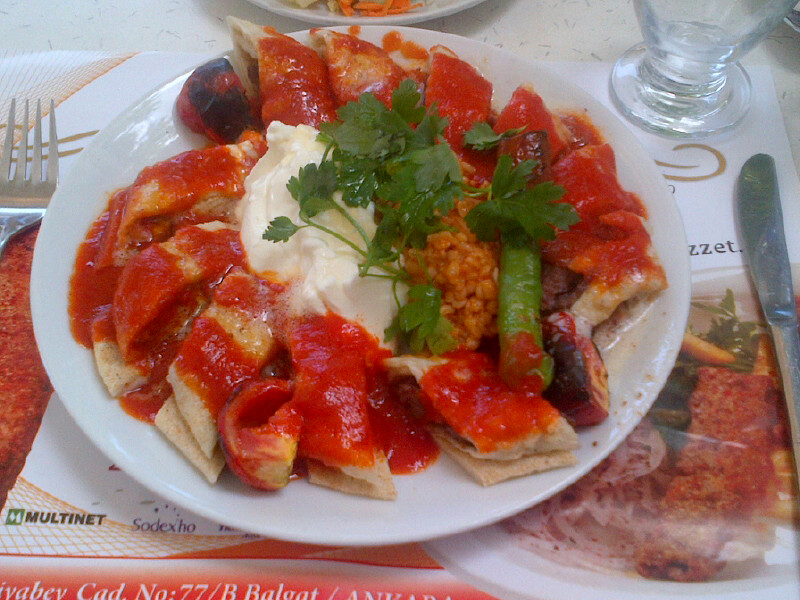
Beyti

During a visit to Switzerland in 1961, Beyti Güler was inspired by the renowned butcher Möller's way of preparing meat. When he returned home, he introduced a dish consisting of roasted lamb fillets wrapped in strips of lamb cutlet fat. It came to be named after him, as Beyti kebab, when the kebab's fame spread internationally. However, the dish made of ground meat, widely sold as street food under the same name, bears little resemblance to his original.

== Notable customers ==
In more than fifty years, many heads of state, high-ranking politicians, top businessmen and celebrities from around the globe have dined in Beyti during their visits to Istanbul.
