= List of kebabs =

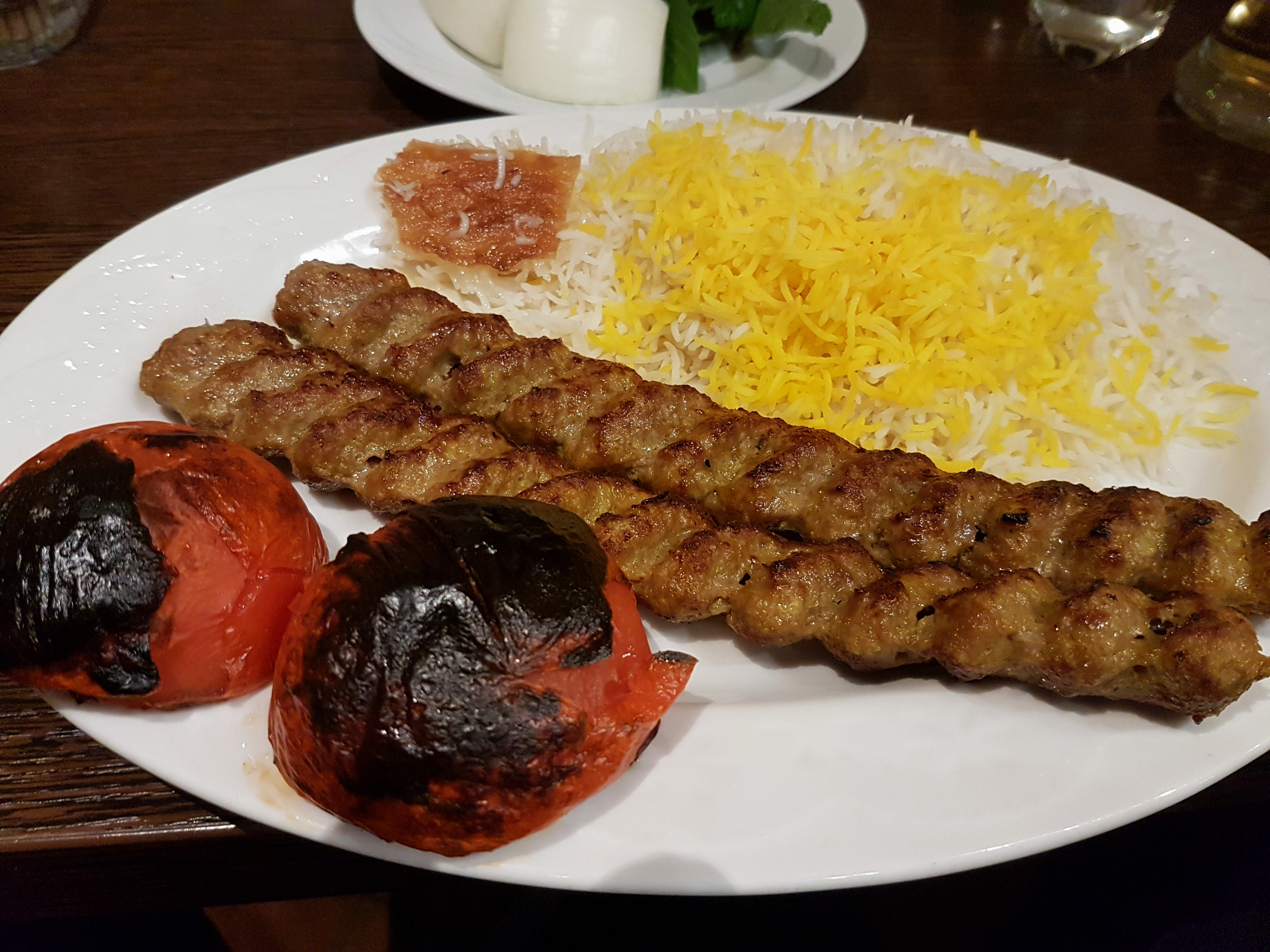
A Persian koobideh kebab (Berlin)

This is a list of kebab dishes from around the world. Kebabs are various cooked meat dishes, with their origins in Middle Eastern cuisine and the Muslim world. Although kebabs are often cooked on a skewer, many types of kebab are not.

== Armenia ==
Name	Image	Description
Lula kebab		Can be served skewered or wrapped in lavash bread.
Khorovats		A traditional Armenian barbecue that can be made with lamb, pork, beef, chicken, fish, or even veal. It is often served with grilled vegetables and lavash. The dish is generally reserved for festive occasions.

== Azerbaijan ==
Name	Image	Description
Lülə kabab		(Russian: люля-кебаб) – served skewered or wrapped in lavash bread
Tikə kabab		Sham kebab
Tava kebab		

== Bangladesh ==
- Jali kabab
- Shami kabab
- Shish kabob

== China ==
Name	Image	Description
Chuanr		Uyghur: Kewap, Chinese: 串儿 Chuanr or 羊肉串 Yangrouchuan — The most popular Xinjiang dish in China: chunks of mutton or mutton fat pierced on metal (or wood or bamboo) skewers, grilled on a coal-fired barbecue, and served with cumin and chili paste. Across Xinjiang, and neighbouring regions such as Kyrgyzstan, the mutton fat is valued equivalent to or more than the meat itself, as it provides energy during the harsh winter months. It has also become a popular street food all over north and west China, where a wide variety of foods are cooked in such a manner. Chuanr was traditionally made from lamb (yáng ròu chuàn, 羊肉串), which is still the most common, but now, chicken, pork, beef, and seafood are used. It is typically roasted over charcoal or electric heat, but it is sometimes cooked by deep frying in oil (popular in Beijing).
Shaokao		Similar to Chuanr, it is predominantly found on busy Chinese streets and night markets as a street food sold in food stalls and is a type of xiaochi. In China and elsewhere, such as in the United States, diners sometimes also order beer as an accompaniment. Shaokao typically consists of heavily spiced, barbecued foods on skewers. It is available in almost all of the cities in China, and is a prominent dish in Beijing, China, where some restaurants set up food stalls outdoors to purvey the product.

== Cyprus ==
Name	Image	Description
Sheftalia		A traditional Cypriot sausage made of ground pork or lamb and wrapped in caul fat that is served alone or in a pita, usually with tomato, cucumber, parsley, and lemon.
Souvlaki		Skewers consisting of pork, chicken or lamb that is barbecued. Pictured is a souvlaki platter.

== Ghana ==
Name	Image	Description
Kyinkyinga		The northern Ghanaian kebab, synonymous with suya in Nigeria, and prepared by the same Hausa ethnic group

== Greece ==
Name	Image	Description
Gyros		Introduced to Athens in the 1950s by immigrants from Turkey and the Middle East. Thin portions are shaved off and often served in a pita bread with onion. tomato, fried potatoes and Greek tzatziki sauce
Souvlaki		Skewered pieces of pork meat.
Kleftiko		Kleftiko: literally meaning "in the style of the Klephts", is lamb slow-baked on the bone, first marinated in garlic and lemon juice, originally cooked in a pit oven. It is said that the Klephts, bandits of the countryside who did not have flocks of their own, would steal lambs or goats and cook the meat in a sealed pit to avoid the smoke being spotted.
Kontosouvli		Kontosouvli: large pieces of pork meat are cooked rotisserie and served chopped on a wooden plate or on ladokola
Kempap Giaourtlou		Kempap Giaourtlou: a recipe from Asia Minor and Constantinople made from spicy ground lamb kofta kebab, yogurt sauce, tomato sauce.

== India ==
Name	Image	Description
Bihari kabab		Skewered pieces of meat marinated in spice. Originally a dish from the non-vegetarian cuisine, Muslims invented Bihari kabab of the North Indian state of Bihar as it is made out of beef. It has spread to other countries.
Boti kebab		A mutton kebab. Boti kebab is pictured at the bottom of the image.
Achari Tikka		
Chicken tikka		Another tandoori kebab, made of cubed chicken marinated with yogurt and spices
Dora kabab		
Galawat kabab		A variant of Shami kebab made without any admixture or binding agents and comprising just the minced beef (Muslim origin) and the spices. Speciality of Lucknow.
Hariyali kabab		Punjabi style chicken tikka or kabab made with combination of mint and coriander
Kakori kabab		Made of minced beef meat with spices, a specialty of Muslims of Lucknow & Delhi
Galauti kebab		A smoked patty prepared using leg of lamb that includes onion, garlic, ginger, saffron and spices, which is cooked on a griddle
Hariyali kebab		A vegetarian kebab prepared using lentils and spinach
Tangri kebab		Chicken legs roasted on open fire with hot spices and laced with butter or ghee
Kastoori kebab		
Dahi ke kabab		
Burra kebab		
Kalmi kebab		A chicken kebab. Kalmi kebab is pictured on the left in the image.
Paneer kabab		Vegetarian kebab
Reshmi kabab		A kebab of Mughlai cuisine that is prepared with marinated chicken, lamb or beef
Seekh kebab		Prepared with minced meat with spices and grilled on skewers. It is cooked in a Tandoor, and is often served with chutneys or mint sauce. A seekh kebab can also be served in a naan bread much like döner kebab.
Shami kebab		Made of minced beef, with paste of lentils and chopped onion and coriander and green chillies usually added to the mixture, which is kneaded in a disc-like shape and fried. Best results are obtained when fried in animal fat or ghee in a brass utensil over a coal fire. In some places, a binding agent is used to keep the kebab together.
Shikampur kabab		
Sutli Kebab		Sutli kabab is made by wrapping a paste of meat & spices around a metal sheekh, tying it with a cotton thread & then heating it in a barbeque pit. Once the kabab is done, the thread is removed & the kabab is served.
Khiri Kebab		Kebab made from marinated udder (mammary glands), known for its distinctively rubbery and chewy texture.

== Iran ==
Not every dish containing the word "kebab" is listed below. For example, chelow kabab (چلوکباب, lit. 'cooked rice plus kebab') is not listed, because it is a meal consisting of cooked rice and one of the many kebab types listed below. Such is the case of kabāb turki (کباب ترکی, Persian variation of shawarma), Tāskabāb (تاس‌کباب, actually a stew), kabāb shāmi (کباب شامی, cutlets). or Tābeh kabāb (تابه کباب, pan-fried ground beef).

Name	Image	Description
Joujeh kabab (جوجه کباب, lit. 'roasted chicken')		Grilled chicken on skewers
Kabab koobideh (کبابِ کوبیده, lit. 'flattened kebab')		Ground beef or lamb (usually sirloin), often mixed with parsley and chopped onions. The mixture is formed into a flat stripped and grilled on extra-wide skewers.
Kabab bakhtiari (کباب بختیاری, lit. 'Bakhtiari kebab')		Combination of jujeh kabab and kabab barg
Kabab barg (کبابِ برگ, lit. 'leaf kebab')		Grilled marinated sirloin.
Kabab chenjeh (کباب چنجه)		Grilled lamb prepared similar to shish kebab, without the vegetables
Kabab torsh (کبابِ ترش, lit. 'sour kebab')		Grilled beef marinated in a mixture of pomegranate juice, crushed walnuts, parsley, crushed garlic, and olive oil
Kabab vaziri (کبابِ وزیری, lit. 'nobility kebab')		A meal that consists of a combination of jujeh kabab and kabab koobideh, prepared in different skewers but served together
Kabab digi (کباب دیگی, lit. 'pot-cooked kebab')		
Kabab soltani (کباب سلطانی, lit. 'royal kebab')		A meal that consists of a combination of jujeh kabab and kabab barg, prepared in different skewers but served together
Kabab Bonab (کباب بناب, lit. 'kebab of Bonab')		
Kabab Lari (کباب لاری, lit. 'kebab of Lar')		
Shishlik (شیشلیک, lit. 'Shashlik')		
Jegar (جگر, lit. 'liver')		Grilled lamb liver, placed between slices of bread to preserve its juice. Some delicacy variations of the dish include grilled heart or kidney in the same manner. Because of potential health issues, it is often consumed with vegetables, fresh lemon's juice, onion, pepper, or other spice. The name is a variation of جگر (lit. 'Liver').
Gojeh kabab (گوجه کباب, lit. 'grilled tomato')		Tomatoes grilled to taste. Almost never eaten alone, but are served alongside other kebab.
Kabab Gerashi (کباب گراشی, lit. 'kebab of Gerash')		
Kabab kordi (کبابِ کُردی, lit. 'Kurdish kebab')		Ground lamb or beef, onions, garlic, and tomatoes
Kabab loghmeh (کباب لقمه, lit. 'bite-sized kebab')		Minced lamb meatballs first fried and the grilled over charcoal fire, eaten with chopped parsley, chopped onions, and sumac. A summer outing favorite.
Kabab rashti (کباب رشتی, lit. 'kebab of Rasht')		Includes almond, pistachio, and barberry
Kabab shamshiri (کباب شمشیری, lit. 'Sword-like kebab')		Consists of kabab barg on one end of skewer and kabab koobideh on the other
Kabab-e donbalan		Lamb testicles kabab
Donbeh kababi (دنبه کبابی, lit. 'grilled tail fat')		Very small amount of lamb tail fat, grilled alongside other kebabs to enhance their taste and richness. Never consumed alone.
Kebab golpayegan (کباب گلپایگانی, lit. 'kebab of Golpayegan')		
Gholve (قلوه, lit. 'kidney')		
Dush kabab (دوش کباب, lit. 'Kebab of Shoulder')		
Tanurche (تنورچه)		
Del (دل, lit. 'heart')		
Khosh Gusht (خوش‌گوشت, lit. 'Pancreas')		
Khoak (خوئک, lit. 'Spleen')		
Dande Kabab (دنده کباب, lit. 'Rib kebab')		
File Kabab (فیله کباب, lit. 'tenderloin kebab')		
Kabab hosseini (کباب حسینی)		Lamb or beef cooked on skewers with onions, tomatoes and green peppers
Kabab negini (کباب نگینی, lit. 'Jewel kebab')		

== Japan ==
Name	Image	Description
Kushikatsu		Japanese dish of deep-fried skewered meat and vegetables.
Kushiyaki		Similar to Yakitori, but instead of using chicken meat, it uses either pork, beef, seafood (especially ayu sweetfish), vegetables, rice cakes or tofus.
Yakitori		Japanese type of skewered chicken. Its preparation involves attaching the meat to a skewer and grilled over charcoal. It is often eaten with salt or a tare sauce and is a popular choice in izakayas (Japanese bars) or street food carts.

== Kenya ==
Name	Image	Description
Mshikaki		Diced or sliced meat, marinated and tenderized before slowly grilled on charcoal flame with wooden skewers.

== Korea ==
Name	Image	Description
Jeok		A meat dish served with skewers. Jeok is typically made with a large variety of meats, vegetables and mushrooms and is usually served on special occasions such as birthdays (hwangap) and wedding ceremonies.
Kkochi		Korean skewers made from chicken, seafood, fishcake, blood sausage or rice cake.

== Levant ==
Name	Image	Description
Kabab Memuleh b'hatzilim		A kebab balls made of minced beef, garlic, parsley, baharat, salt, black pepper, onions and cumin which stuffed with a mixture of fried or grilled eggplants and tahini. Originally from Israel.
Kebab halabi		A kind of kebab served with a spicy tomato sauce and Aleppo pepper, very common in Syria, Lebanon and the Galilee region in Northern Israel, named after the city of Aleppo (Halab). Aleppo is well known for its kebab cuisine, reportedly having at least 26 original dishes.
Kebab hindi		Rolled meat with tomato paste, onion, capsicum and pomegranate molasses
Kebab kamayeh		Soft meat with truffle pieces, onion and various nuts
Cherry kebab		For cherry kebab in Arabic – meatballs (lamb) along with cherries and cherry paste, pine nuts, sugar and pomegranate molasses. It is considered one of Aleppo's main dishes.
Kebab khashkhash		Rolled lamb or beef with chili pepper paste, parsley, garlic and pine nuts. Pictured is Kebab khashkhash from Aleppo.
Kebab siniyye		For tray kebab in Arabic – lean minced lamb in a tray added with chili pepper, onion and tomato
Kebab tuhal		Lamb rounds stuffed with parsley, hot green peppers and pine kernels
Shawarma		Similar to a doner kebab, traditionally made with chunks of lamb meat, but also with chicken, turkey, beef or veal

== Nigeria ==
Name	Image	Description
Suya		A spicy meat kebab eaten across West Africa. A recipe of the Muslim Hausa people in northern Nigeria and southern Niger, this kebab has flavoof peanuts and spicy pepper and is sold by street vendors as a snack or entire meal. The kebabs are eaten with onion and bell pepper pieces. It is a traditionally Muslim kebab, prepared according to Halal methods.

== Pakistan ==
Name	Image	Description
Chapli kebab		A delicacy of Pakistan from Khyber Pakhtunkhwa province – marinated beef in spices and deep fried flat. In Pakistan, it is sometimes deep fried in animal tallow, and it is a common kebab. (Note: "In Pakistan, animal tallow is used as commercial deep-frying agent for the traditional food chapli kebab. The chapli and shami kabab are considered as one of the most commercially available traditional dishes of people living in Pakistan, ...")
Lola kabab/Gola kabab		Kabab of Pakistan and Afghanistan – rolled meatballs originating in Peshawar and Kandahar.
Shami kebab		Made of minced meat, with paste of lentils and chopped onion and coriander and green chillies usually added to the mixture, which is kneaded in a disc-like shape and fried. Best results are obtained when fried in ghee. In some places, a binding agent is used to keep the kabab together.
Malai tikka		Chunks or strips of chicken marinated in a white yoghurt and garlic sauce and grilled.
Reshmi kebab		Minced chicken adequately seasoned and then barbecued on a charcoal grill.
Khaddi Kebab		Eaten in Balochistan cuisine. A whole lamb is stuffed with flavoured rice, marinated and inserted in a dug hole with wood around to cook it. This hole is filled up and whole lamb is cooked underground.
sheesh tauk kebab		Pieces of chicken on stick marinated and lightly grilled.
lamb sajji kebab		The lamb is cooked on its own fat and no oil is used. The key ingredients of this appetizing food include lamb meat, rice, vinegar, red chili powder, black pepper, salt, garlic paste, lemon juice, ajwain, fennel seeds, cumin seeds, coriander seeds, lemon juice and oil.
shahi gola kebab		Etaen in Lahore cuisine
shashlik kebab		square skewers of beef Lamb or chicken partitioned with tomatoes capsicum and onion
Bihari kebab		Chunks or strips of lean beef, marinated in a spicy yoghurt/chilli marinade and tenderized to perfection before slowly grilled on a charcoal flame.
chandan kebab		Mixed meat kebabs
gilafi kebab		
kaleji tava kebab		Liver kebabs.
tawa chicken boti kebab		
dawat e ishq kebab		
sindhi handi kebab		
chicken tikka resa kebab		
chicken angara kebab		Largechicken chunks marinated with a specific spice mix and grilled over charcoal
mahi seeks kebab		Fish seekh kebabs
chicken tandoori kebab		
Patta Tikka		Patta Tikka is from Khyber Pakhtunkhwa (KPK), Pakistan. Marinated chunks of meat/ liver, often beef or lamb, are wrapped in fat (locally referred to as "patta") and grilled over a charcoal flame. Tender chunks of beef or lamb are used, with attention given to the fat-to-meat ratio.

== Portugal ==
Name	Image	Description
Espetadas		Meat skewer, usually beef

== Romania ==
Name	Image	Description
Frigărui		Small pieces of meat (usually pork, beef, mutton, lamb or chicken) grilled on a skewer, very similar to shashlik, or shish kebab. Often, the pieces of meat alternate with bacon, sausages, or vegetables, such as onions, tomatoes, bell peppers and mushrooms. It is seasoned with spices such as pepper, garlic, savory, rosemary, marjoram and laurel.

== South Africa ==
Name	Image	Description
Sosatie		A dish of the Cape Malay people of South Africa. It is a type of kebab related to satay, which came to Indonesia via Muslim traders from India, and was brought from there to South Africa.

== Spain ==
Name	Image	Description
Pincho moruno		Meat skewer, usually made of chicken or pork, sliced in cubes, marinated in paprika and other spices.

== Turkey ==
Name	Image	Description
Adana kebabı		Also known as kıyma kebabı – kebab with hand-minced (zırh) meat mixed with chili on a flat wide metal skewer (shish); associated with Adana region although very popular all over Turkey.
Ali Paşa kebabı (Ali Pasha kebab)		Cubed lamb with tomato, onion and parsley wrapped in filo
Alinazik kebab		Ground meat kebab sautéed in a saucepan, with garlic, yogurt and eggplants added
Bahçıvan kebabı		Boneless lamb shoulder mixed with chopped onions and tomato paste
Beykoz kebabı		Tomato and onion flavoured lamb, wrapped in aubergine slices and garnished with lamb brains
Beyti kebab		Ground lamb or beef, seasoned and grilled on a skewer, often served wrapped in lavash and topped with tomato sauce and yogurt, traced back to the famous kebab house Beyti in Istanbul and particularly popular in Turkey's larger cities.
Bostan kebabı		Lamb and aubergine casserole.
Cağ kebabı (spoke kebab)		Cubes of lamb roasted first on a cağ (a horizontal rotating spit) and then on a skewer, a specialty of Erzurum region with recently rising popularity
Çardak kebabı		Stuffed lamb meat wrapped in a crepe or filo.
Ciğer kebabı (liver kebab)		Lamb liver kebab on a skewer (a.k.a. ciğer şiş)
Çökertme kebabı		Sirloin veal kebap stuffed with yogurt and potatoes
Çöp şiş (small skewer kebab)		A specialty of Selçuk and Germencik near Ephesus, pounded boneless meat with tomatoes and garlic marinated with black pepper, thyme and oil on wooden skewers
Döner kebap		
İskender kebap		Döner kebap served with yogurt, tomato sauce and butter, originated in Bursa. The kebab was invented by İskender Efendi in 1867. He was inspired from Cağ kebab and turned it from horizontal to vertical.
İslim kebabı (stew)		Another version of the aubergine kebab without its skin, marinated in sunflower oil
Kağıt kebabı		Lamb (or veal) cooked in a paper wrapping
Kılıç şiş		Brochette of swordfish
Şiş köfte		Also known as Shish köfte – minced lamb meatballs with herbs, often including parsley and mint, on a stick, grilled
Kuyu kebabı (pit kebab)		Prepared from the goat it is special for Aydın region, similar to tandır kebabı
Kuzu şiş		Shish kebap prepared with marinated milk-fed lamb meat
Manisa kebabı		This Manisa region version of the kebab is smaller and flat size shish meat on the sliced pide bread, flavored with butter, and stuffed with tomato, garlic and green pepper.
Orman kebabı (forest kebab)		Lamb meat on the bone and cut in large pieces mixed with carrots, potatoes and peas
Patates kebabı		Beef or chicken mixed with potatoes, onions, tomato sauce and bay leaves
Patlıcan kebabı (aubergine kebab)		A unique kebap meat marinated in spices and served with aubergines, hot pide bread and a yogurt sauce
Şiş kebabı		Prepared with fish, lamb or chicken meat on thin metal or reed rods, grilled
Şiş tavuk		Also known as Tavuk şiş or – Yogurt-marinated chicken grilled on a stick
Sivas kebabı		Associated with the Sivas region, similar to Tokat kebab but especially lamb ribs are preferred and it also differs from Tokat kebabı on the point that there are no potatoes inside
Lamb tandoori		Lamb pieces (sometimes a whole lamb) baked in an oven called a tandır, which requires a special way of cooking for hours. Served with bread and raw onions.
Tantuni		Tantuni is a spicy dürüm consisting of julienne cut beef or sometimes lamb stir-fried on a sac with a hint of cotton oil. It is a specialty of the city of Mersin, Turkey.
Tas kebap (veal stew)		Stewed meat in a bowl, beginning with the cooking of the vegetables in butter employing a method called yağa vurmak, ("butter infusion"), before the meat itself is cooked in the same grease
Testi kebabı (earthenware-jug kebab)		Ingredients are similar to çömlek kebabı, prepared in a testi instead of a güveç, generally found in Central Anatolia and the Mid-Western Black Sea region
Tire kebabı		Minced meat cooked on sheesh and served with maydanoz and sauce, on top of special tire bread
Tokat Kebab		Associated with the Tokat region, it is made with marinated lamb, grilled inside an oven, together with aubergines, tomatoes, potatoes, entire onions and garlics and served over a special flatbread called lavaş (a thicker yufka) and softened with the juice of the meat and tomatoes.
Urfa kebabı		From Urfa, similar to Adana kebab, but not spicy
Vali Kebabı (Governor Kebab)		Essentially a mix of kebabs.

== Others ==
Name	Image	Description
Anticucho		Peruvian meat dishes that originated in the Andes during the pre-Columbian era. The meat may be marinated in vinegar and spices (such as cumin, ají pepper and garlic). While anticuchos can be made of any type of meat, the most popular are made of beef heart.
Arrosticini		Italian skewers made from mutton or lamb cut in chunks and pierced by a skewer. Arrosticini cooked on a brazier with a typically elongated shape, called furnacella, which resembles a gutter.
Chislic		This is a migration of Russian culture into South Dakota by the German-Russian population.
Churrasco		Popular in certain parts of South America like Argentina, Bolivia, Brazil and Uruguay where it's a national barbecue tradition. It involves grilling various cuts of meat, often on skewers, and is typically served with a chimichurri sauce.
Nem nướng		A skewered dish from Vietnam consisting of ground pork or ground beef mixed with shallot, garlic, fish sauce. Usually dipped with nước chấm sauce or peanut sauce.
Ražnjići		Western Balkan dish similar to shish kebab and shashlik.
Samak kebab		A kebab dish consisting of grilled fish on a stick, it is typically marinated in an olive oil and lemon dressing.
Satay		A Southeast Asian dish consisting of diced or sliced meat, skewered and grilled over a fire, then served with various spicy seasonings. It was developed by Javanese street vendors as a unique adaptation of Indian kebabs.
Sekuwa		Nepalese skewered dish consisting of meat that is marinated with a blend of spices and then grilled over an open flame or charcoal, giving it a smoky, rich flavor. Typically made with meats such as goat, chicken, buffalo, or lamb, though variations may include pork or a mixture of meats.
Shashlik		Shashlyk, meaning skewered meat, was originally made of lamb. Nowadays it is also made of pork or beef depending on local preferences and religious observances.
Shish kebab		A popular meal of skewered and grilled cubes of meat.
Steckerlfisch		Bavarian and Austrian dish meaning “fish on a stick.” Whole fish, usually mackerel or trout are marinated with oil, salt, lemon, and herbs, then skewered lengthwise on wooden sticks and grilled. Traditionally served whole with rye bread and lemon, it’s a popular beer garden and festival food, especially during Oktoberfest.
Stonner kebab		The stonner kebab is a pork sausage wrapped in strips of gyro meat, coated in two layers of batter, then deep fried and later served on a bed of chips. The name stonner is derived from a combination of "sausage" and "donner", and is the Glaswegian slang word for an "erection".

== See also ==
- List of meat dishes
- List of spit-roasted foods
