= Kebab =

Variety of meat dishes originating in the Middle East

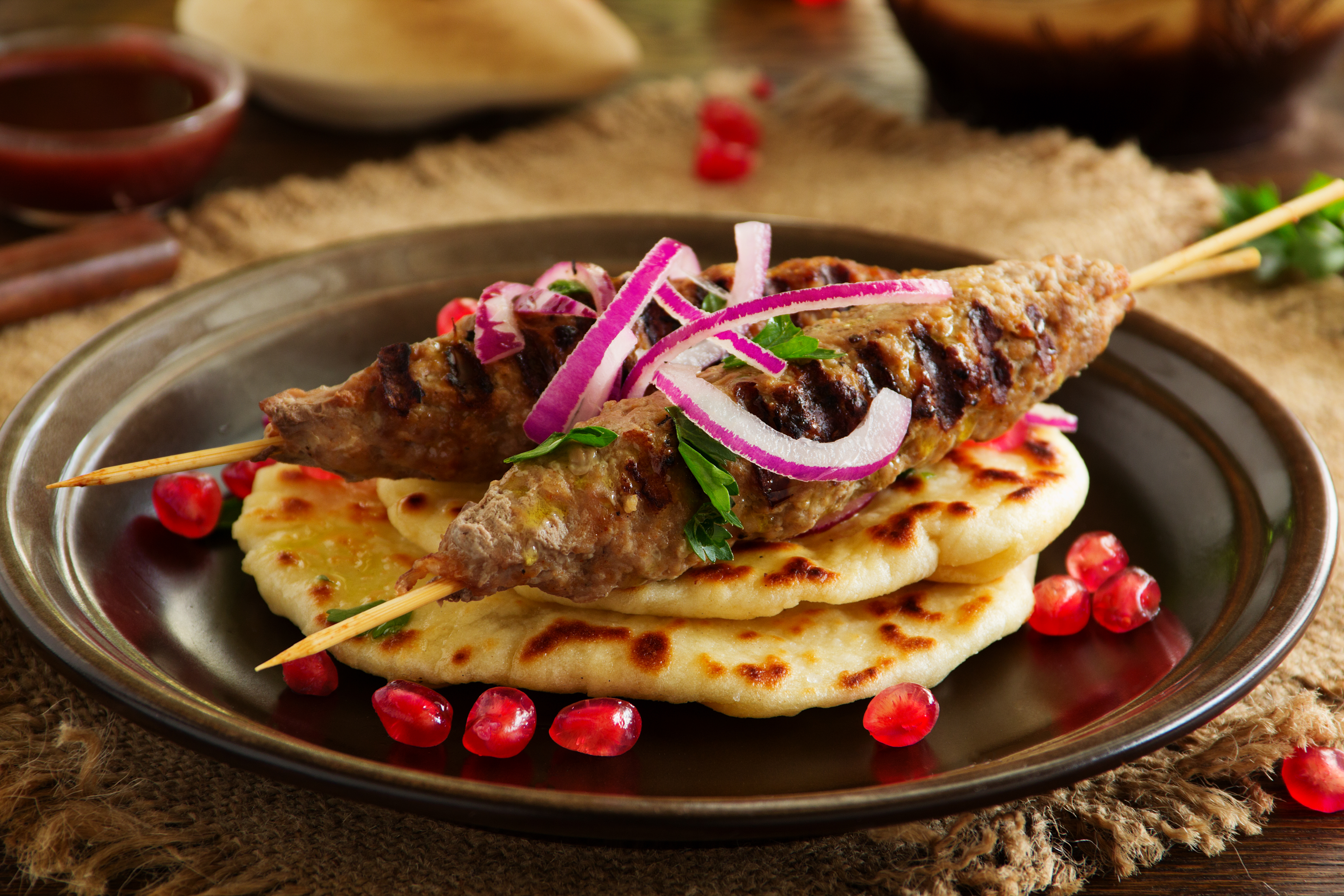
- A typical ground meat kebab, a food that exists by various names in many world cuisines
- Course: Main course
- Place of origin: Anatolia, Iran
- Region or state: Middle East, Balkans, Central and South Asia
- Serving temperature: Hot
- Main ingredients: Meat

Kebab (Note: Persian: كباب, romanized: kabāb; Arabic: كباب, romanized: kabāb, pronounced [kæˈbæːb]; Turkish: kebap, pronounced [ceˈbap].) (UK: /kɪˈbæb/ kib-AB, US: /kɪˈbɑːb/ kib-AHB), kebap, kabob (alternative North American spelling), kebob, or kabab (Kashmiri) is a variety of roasted meat dishes that originated in the Middle East.

Kebabs consist of cut-up meat, sometimes with vegetables and various other accompaniments according to the specific recipe. Although kebabs are typically cooked on a skewer over a fire, some kebab dishes are oven-baked in a pan, or prepared as a stew such as tas kebab. The traditional meat for kebabs is most often lamb meat, but regional recipes may include beef, goat, chicken, fish, or even pork (depending on whether or not there are specific religious prohibitions).

== Etymology ==
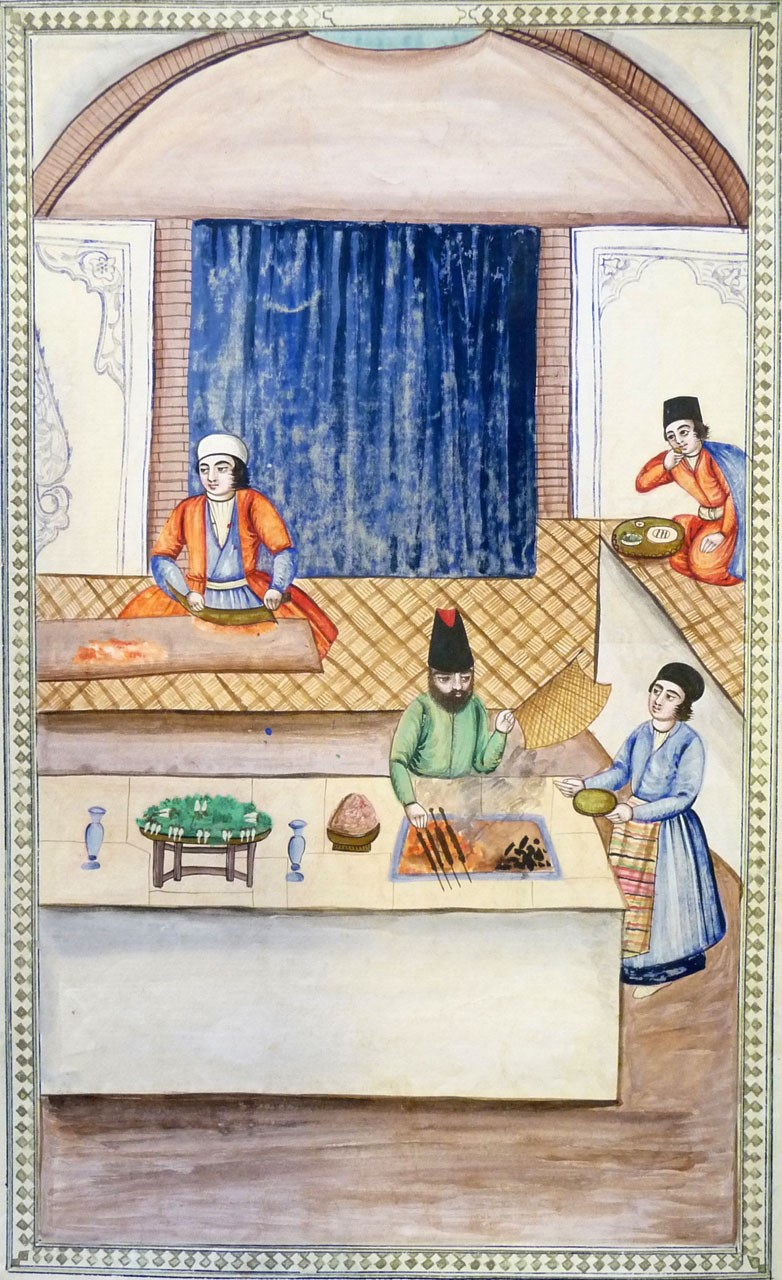
A kababforush (kebab seller) in late Qajar Iran

The word kebab has ancient origins. It was popularized in the West by Turks to refer to a range of grilled and broiled meat, which may be cooked on skewers, including stews, meatballs, and many other forms.

The word kebab likely came to English in the late 17th century from Arabic: كَبَاب kabāb, partly via kabāb (कबाब / کباب) Hindi-Urdu and Persian, as well as kebap Turkish. The Turkish Language Association also states that it is from Arabic: كَبَاب kabāb, while according to linguist Sevan Nişanyan, the Turkish word kebap is also derived from the Persian word kabāb, meaning roasted meat. It appears in Turkish texts as early as the 14th century, in Kyssa-i Yusuf (lit. 'the story of Joseph'), though still in the Persian form. Nişanyan states that the word has the equivalent meaning of 'frying, burning' with kabābu in the old Akkadian language, and kbabā כבבא in Aramaic. In contrast, food historian Gil Marks says that the medieval Arabic and Turkish terms were adopted from the Persian kabab, which probably derived from the Aramaic.

The American Heritage Dictionary also gives a probable East Semitic root origin with the meaning of 'burn', 'char', or 'roast', from the Aramaic and Akkadian. The Babylonian Talmud instructs that Temple offerings not be kabbaba (burned). These words point to an origin in the prehistoric Proto-Afroasiatic language: *kab-, to burn or roast.

== History ==
While the word kebab or shish kebab may sometimes be used in English as a culinary term that refers to any type of small chunks of meat cooked on a skewer, kebab is mainly associated with a diversity of meat dishes that originated in Persia and Anatolia.

In Ibn Sayyar al-Warraq's 10th-century Baghdadi cookbook Kitāb al-Ṭabīkh (Arabic: كتاب الطبيخ), a compendium of much of the legacy of Mesopotamian, Persian, and Arab cuisines, there are descriptions of kabāb as cut-up meat, either fried in a pan or grilled over a fire. In the 14th-century Arabic dictionary Lisdan al-'Arab, kabab is defined as tabahajah (a Persian word from tabah), which contains pieces of fried meat cooked in some liquid.

This cuisine has spread around the world, in parallel with Muslim influence. According to Ibn Battuta, a Maghrebi traveller, kebab was served in the royal houses during the Delhi Sultanate (1206–1526), and even commoners would enjoy it for breakfast with naan. Kebab dishes have been adopted and integrated with local cooking styles and innovations, from the now-ubiquitous doner kebab fast food to the many variations of shish kebab, such as the satays of Southeast Asia.

== Varieties by region ==
In most English-speaking countries, a kebab may be the classic shish kebab or souvlaki – small cubes of meat cooked on a skewer – or made with minced (ground) meat, as in doner kebab. By contrast, in Indian English, Bangladeshi English, Pakistani English and in the languages of the Middle East, other parts of Asia, and the Muslim world, a kebab is any of a wide variety of grilled meat dishes. Some dishes ultimately derived from Middle Eastern kebab may have different names in their local languages, such as the Chinese chuan.

=== East Asia ===
==== China ====
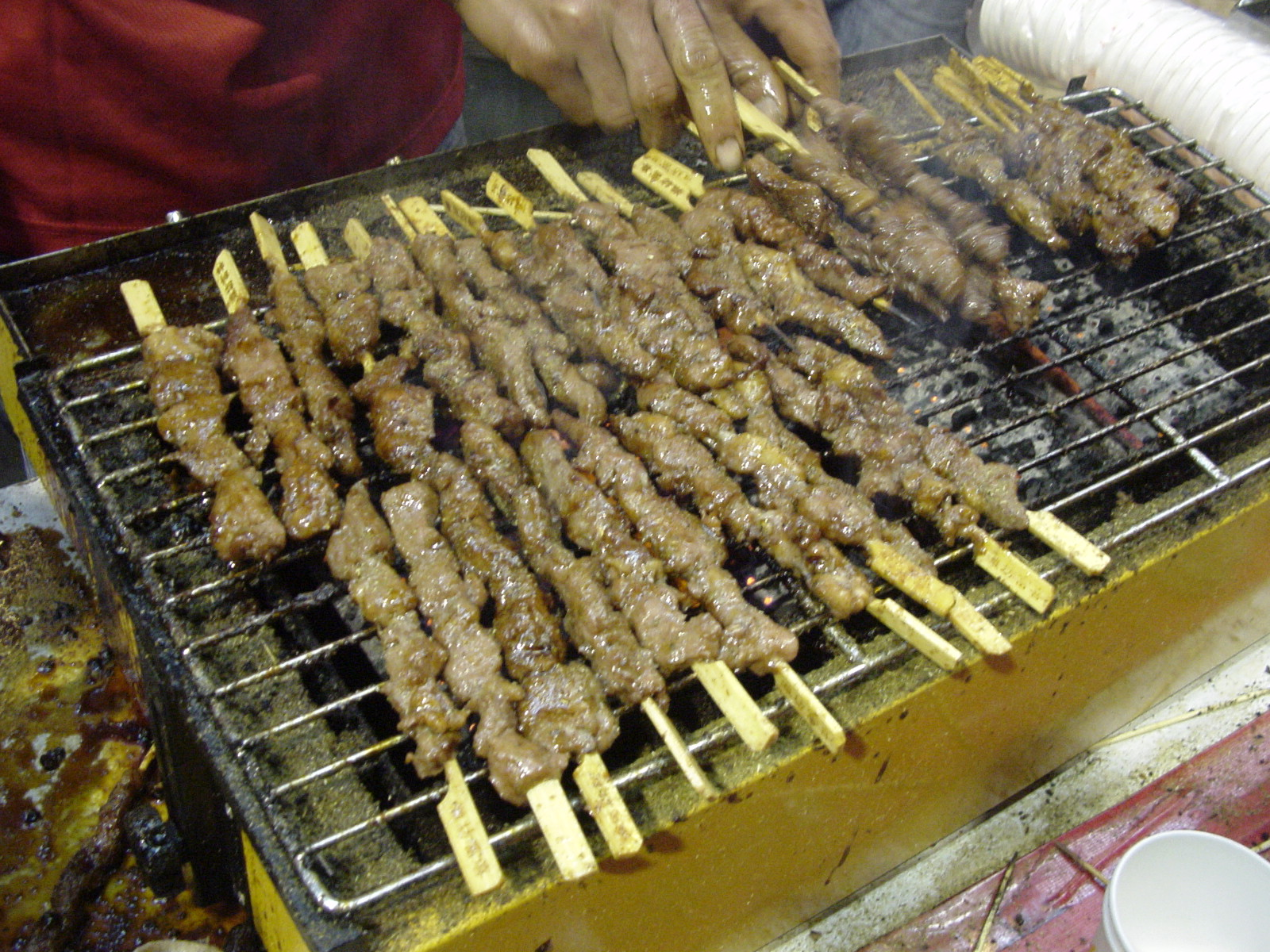
Chuan-style lamb kebab sticks sold by a street vendor

Chuan (Chinese: 串; pinyin: chuàn), often referred to as "chuan" in Mandarin throughout the north, or kawap (كاۋاپ) in Uyghur, is a variation of kebab originating from the Uyghur people in the western province of Xinjiang and a popular dish in Chinese Islamic cuisine. The dish has since spread across the rest of the country and become a popular street food.

Although the most traditional form of chuan uses lamb or mutton, other types of meat, such as chicken, beef, pork, and seafood, may be used as well. Small pieces of meat are skewered and either roasted or deep-fried. Common spices and condiments include cumin, pepper, sesame, and sesame oil.

=== Europe ===
==== Greece ====
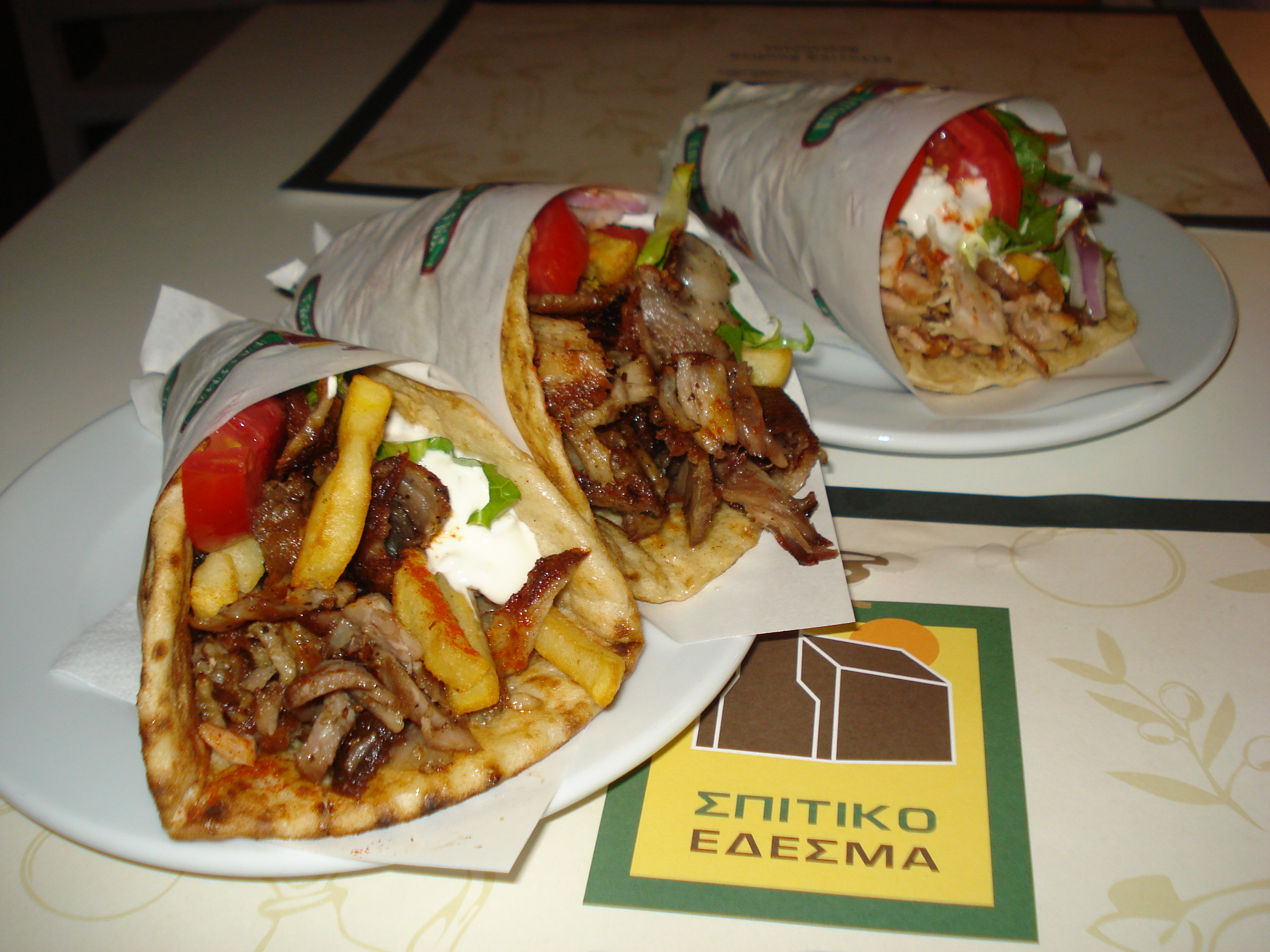
Gyro kebab sandwiches in Greece served with fixings and tzatziki sauce in pita bread

Kebabs existed as far back as the 17th century BC in the Minoan civilization. In Homer's Odyssey, there are descriptions of skewering strips of meat for broiling. Clifford A. Wright considers these an early version of shish kebab. In Classical Greece and Hellenistic Greece, kebabs were prepared in ancient Athenian taverna sites. They were grilled on an eschara.

Kebabs were also staples in the Byzantine Empire; there is iconographical evidence of Byzantine Greeks preparing them.

In the 1950s, the dish was typically served as a sandwich rolled in pita bread, or on a plate, with French fries and various salads and sauces such as tzatziki. Later in the 1960s, vendors also began selling dishes in the same style made with souvlaki, which resembles Turkish shish kebab, but is usually made with pork. Around the same time, the Greek word gyros replaced döner kebab, and the Greek style of the dish spread to become popular, particularly in North America, and various other parts of the world.

In fact, in West Germany, gyros made with pork had been established as a fast food before döner kebab became popular, dominating the German street food market alongside Italian pizza during the 1970s. A similar situation existed in Paris, France, where Greek restaurateurs were selling "sandwich grec" ("Greek sandwich"). This term was later replaced by "kebab" or "sandwich turc" ("Turkish sandwich").

In contrast to other areas of Greece, in Athens, both types of sandwich may be called souvlaki, with the skewered meat being called kalamaki.

The origin of the dish is a topic of sometimes heated debate, at least between Greeks and Turks. While English speakers may refer to souvlaki skewers as kebabs, they are not properly called that in Greece.

=== West Asia and North Africa ===
==== South Caucasus ====
Both Armenian and Azerbaijani cuisine feature oblong kofta-style mincemeats kebabs known as lula or lyulya kebab, while Armenian cuisine refers to shish-style kebabs as khorovats, and doner kebab as Karsi khorovats after the city of Kars which became known for the dish during the time of the Ottoman Empire.

==== Iran ====
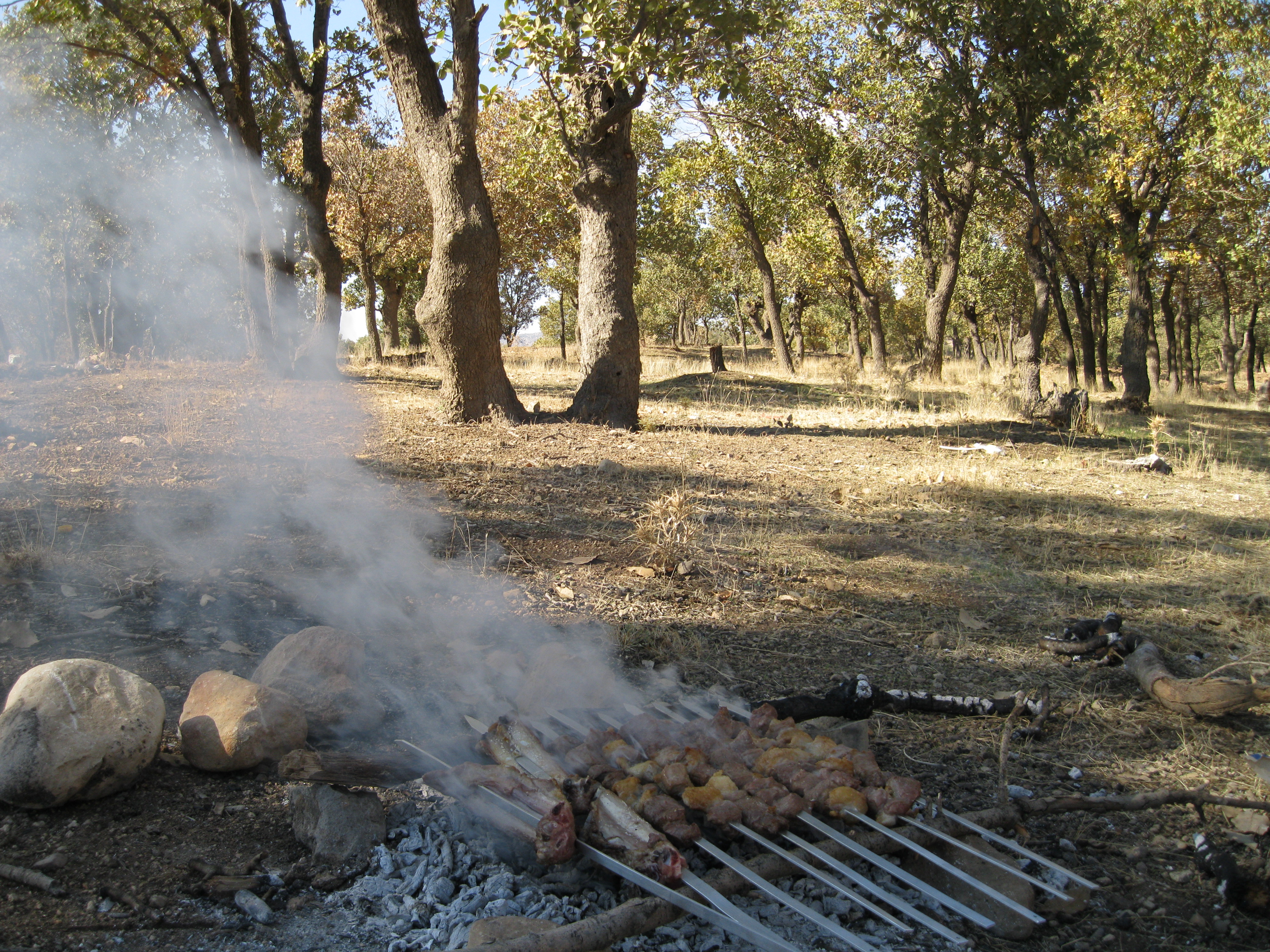
Kabab Chenjeh in Khorramabad

There are several distinct Persian varieties of kabab (Persian: کباب). Kabab may be served with either steamed, saffroned basmati or Persian rice and called chelow kabab (چلوکباب), which is considered the national dish of Iran. It may also be served with the various types of bread that are the most commonly eaten in Iran, such as lavash.

It is served with the basic Iranian meal accompaniments, in addition to grilled tomatoes on the side of the rice and butter on top of the rice. It is an old northern tradition (probably originating in Tehran) that a raw egg yolk should be placed on top of the rice as well, though this is strictly optional, and most restaurants will not serve the rice this way unless it is specifically requested. "Somagh", powdered sumac, is also made available and its use varies based on tastes to a small dash on the rice or a heavy sprinkling on both rice and meat, particularly when used with red (beef/veal/lamb) meat.

At Persian restaurants, the combination of one kabab barg and one kabab koobideh is typically called Soltani, meaning "sultan's feast". The combination of one kabab barg, one jujeh kabab and kabab koobideh is typically called Shah abbasi, meaning "Shah Abbas' meal". The traditional beverage of choice to accompany Persian kabab is doogh, a sour yogurt drink with mint and salt.

In the old bazaar tradition, the rice (which is covered with a tin lid) and accompaniments are served first, immediately followed by the kababs, which are brought to the table by the waiter, who holds several skewers in his left hand, and a piece of flat bread (typically nan-e lavash) in his right. A skewer is placed directly on the rice and while holding the kebab down on the rice with the bread, the skewer is quickly pulled out. With the two most common kababs, barg and koobideh, two skewers are always served. In general, bazaar kabab restaurants only serve these two varieties, though there are exceptions.

In Iranian Azerbaijan, "Binab (also Bonab) Kababi" is very famous in Iranian Azerbaijani local cuisine for its large size. It is named after the city of Binab in East Azerbaijan province. This kabab and other types (e.g., Shishlik, Kubide, Berge, Gelin, etc.) can be served alone or with rice and fresh salad on the side. In this region Kababs come usually with yogurt, hot bread, tomato, onion, parsley and paprika-salt, and tarragon.

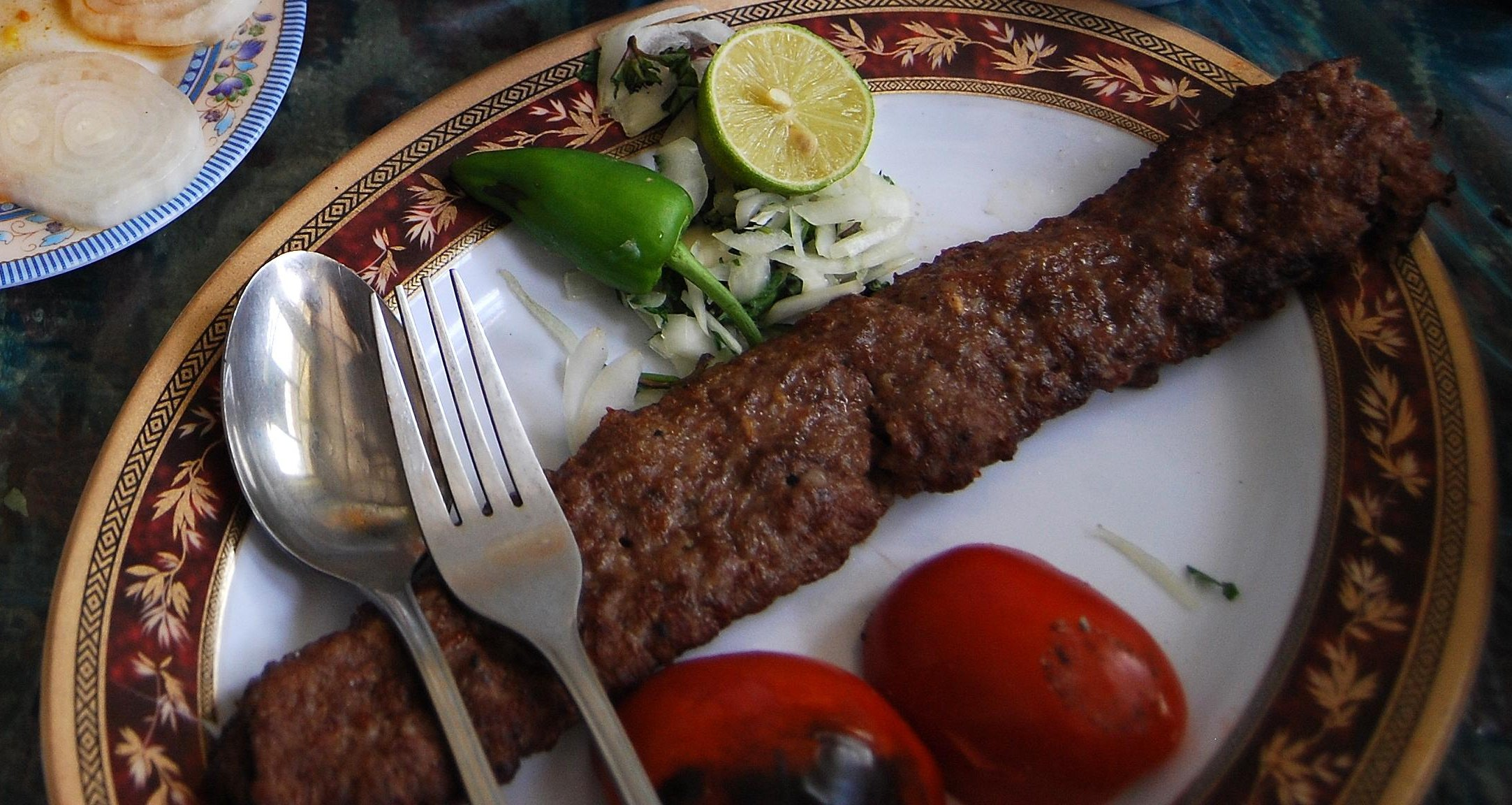
Iranian Kabab Koobideh (Bonab style)

Kabab koobideh (کباب کوبیده) it kūbide (کوبیده) is an Iranian minced meat kabab which is made from ground lamb, beef, or chicken, often mixed with parsley and chopped onions.

Kabab Koobideh contains: ground meat, onion, salt, pepper, turmeric, and seasoning. These ingredients are mixed together until the mixture becomes smooth and sticky. One egg is added to help the mix stick together. The mixture is then pressed around a skewer. Koobideh Kabab is typically 18 to 20 centimeters (7–8 in) long.

Kabāb-e Barg (Persian: کباب برگ) is a Persian style barbecued lamb, chicken or beef kabab dish. The main ingredients of Kabab Barg – a short form of this name – are fillets of beef tenderloin, lamb shank or chicken breast, onions and olive oil.

Marinade is prepared by the mixture of half a cup of olive oil, three onions, garlic, half teaspoon saffron, salt, and black pepper. One kilogram of lamb is cut into 1 cm thick and 4–5 cm long pieces. It should be marinated overnight in refrigerator, and the container should be covered. The next day, the lamb is threaded on long, thin metal skewers. It is brushed with marinade and is barbecued for 5–10 minutes on each side.

Jūjeh Kabāb (جوجهکباب) consists of pieces of chicken first marinated in minced onion and lemon juice with saffron, then grilled over a fire. It is sometimes served with grilled tomato and pepper. Jujeh Kabab is one of the most popular Persian dishes.

Kabab Bakhtiari is a combination of Jujeh kabab (chicken kabab) and Kabab barg (beef or lamb meat) on the same skewer. Its name comes from the Bakhtiari region of Iran.

Kabab Kenjeh, also known as Chenjeh (کنجهکباب, چنجه) is a kabab traditionally made with chunks of marinated lamb meat. It is typically served with grilled tomatoes and rice or bread.

Kabab Torsh is an Iranian Kabab from the northern provinces of Gilan and Mazandaran, renowned for its sour, pomegranate based seasoning.

Kabab Lari, Kabab Tabei (Pan Kabab), Dande Kabab, Kabab Shandiz, Shishlik Kabab, Kabab Ghafghazi, Kabab Soltani, Kabob Vaziri, Kabob Loghmeh, Taas Kabab, Mahi Kabab (Fish Kabab) and Kabab Jegar (Sheep Liver Kaba) are among other types of Persian Kababs popular in Iran.

==== Iraq ====
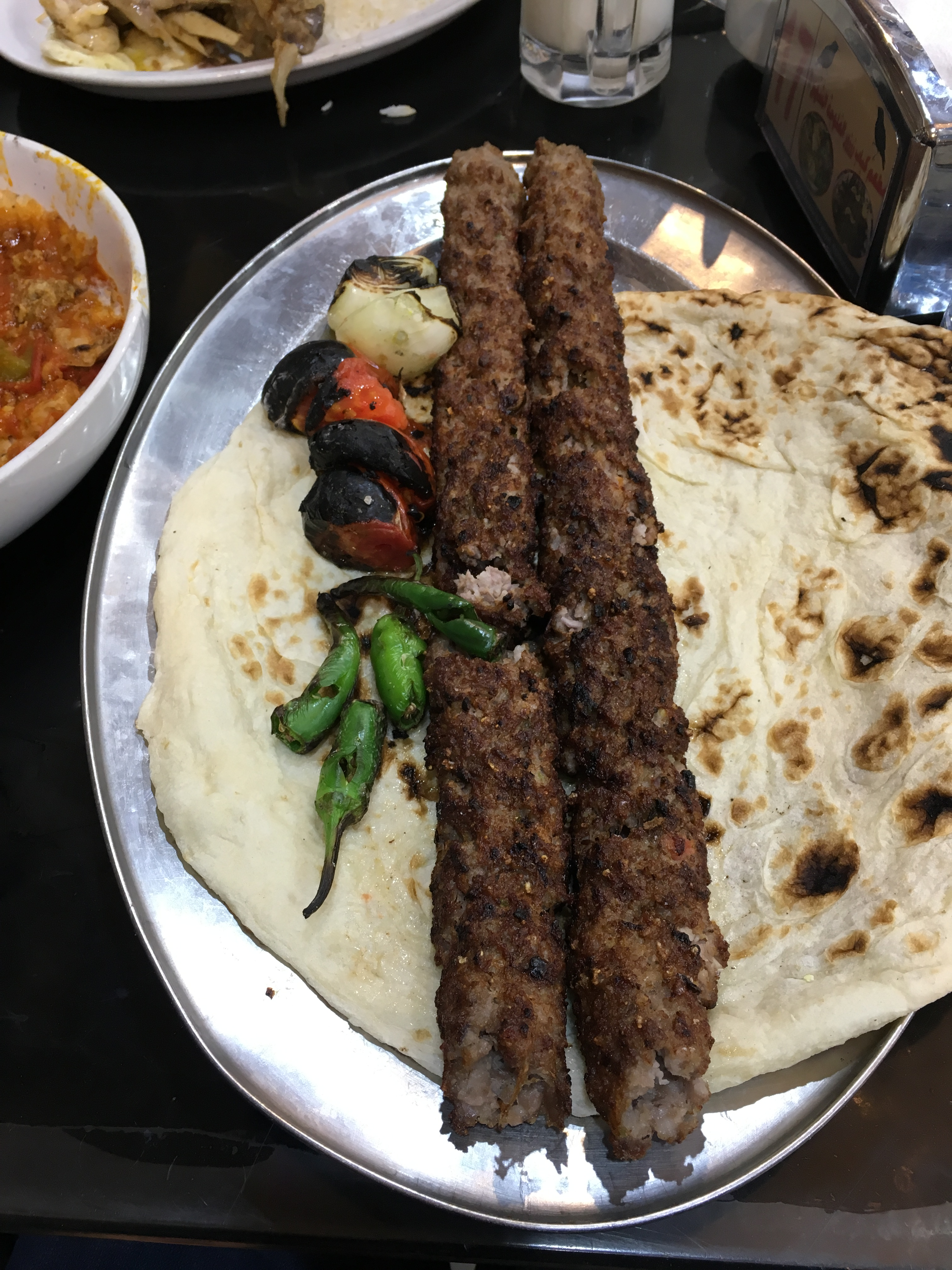
Traditional Iraqi Kebab, made out of ground lamb and known for its oily texture

Several types of kebab are popular in Iraqi cuisine, although the word kebab in local use is reserved for skewers of spiced ground lamb, traditionally grilled on natural wood charcoal to give the kebab its special flavor. Skewers of grilled marinated meat chunks are called tikka.

==== The Levant ====
Several varieties of kebabs can be found in Levantine cuisine. Among the most common are shish taouk, which are grilled chicken skewers marinated in olive oil and spices, and lahem meshwi, charcoal-grilled skewers of prime lamb cubes lightly seasoned with herbs.

The Syrian city of Aleppo is said to have at least twenty-six versions of kebab halabi or Aleppo kebab, including kebab cooked with cherries; with aubergine; with chili, parsley and pine-nuts; and with truffles.

Mizrahi Jews brought various types of grilled meat from their native Middle Eastern countries to Israel, where they have become an essential part of Israeli cuisine. Among the most popular are skewers of elongated spiced ground meat, called kabab (Hebrew: קבב), which have become a staple dish of meat restaurants and the main dish of the traditional holiday barbecues, alongside the shishlik. They are commonly made of beef, though lamb is also occasionally used, and are almost always served with the local pita bread.

Shawarma, although not considered a kebab in most countries of the Levant, is another very popular type of grilled meat preparation that characterizes this region.

==== Egypt ====
Several varieties of kebab are popular in Egyptian cuisine, although the word kebab in local use is reserved for skewers of grilled marinated meat chunks. Skewers of grilled seasoned ground meat are called kofta. Shish taouk, which are skewers of grilled marinated chicken chunks, are another popular variety of kebab in Egypt. All kebabs are grilled on charcoal to give them their special flavor.

==== Turkey ====
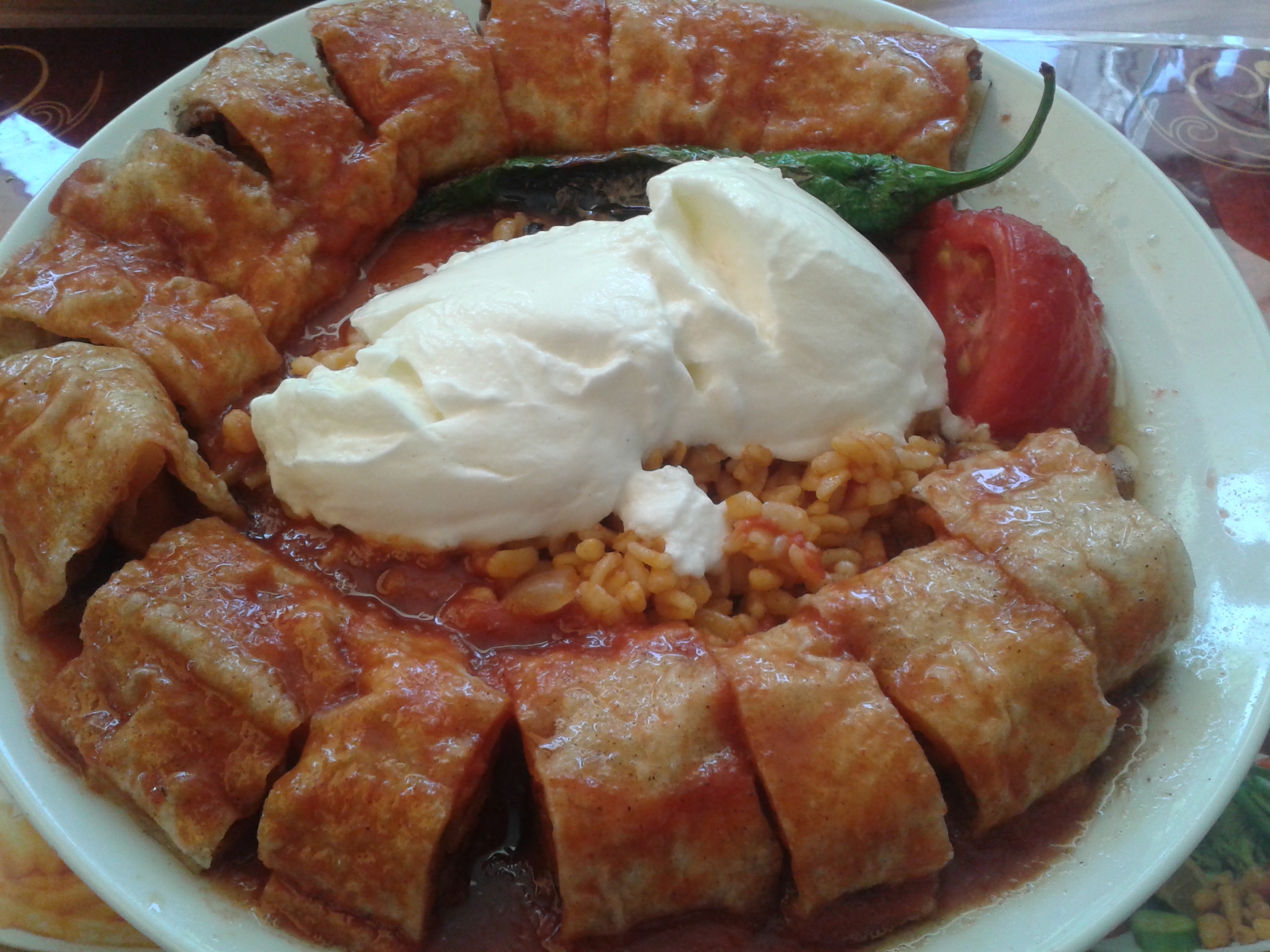
Beyti kebab served with pilav

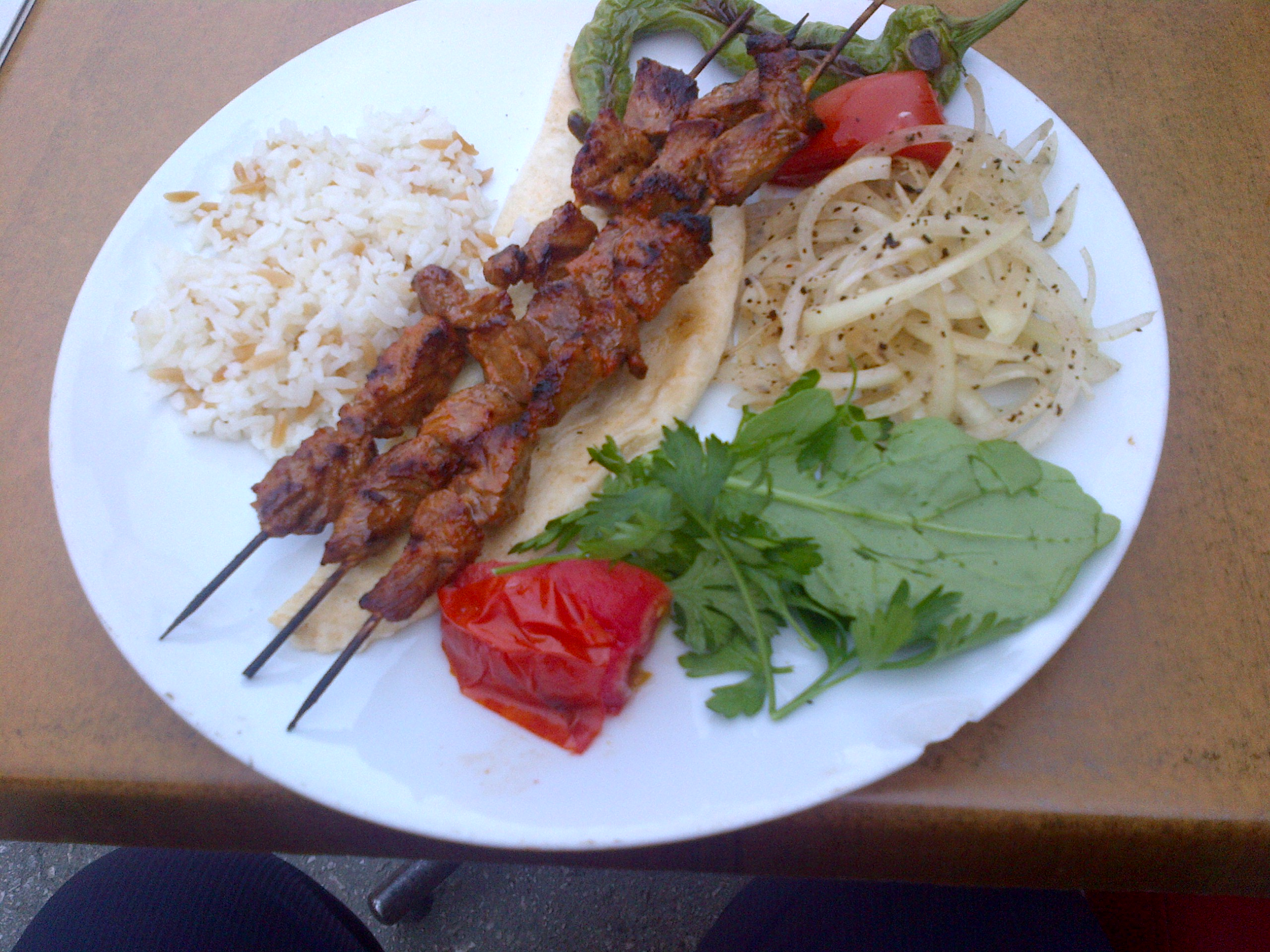
Şiş kebap with "şehriyeli pilav" (orzo pilaf), onions with sumac, a grilled pepper, a slice of tomato (also grilled) and rucula leaves

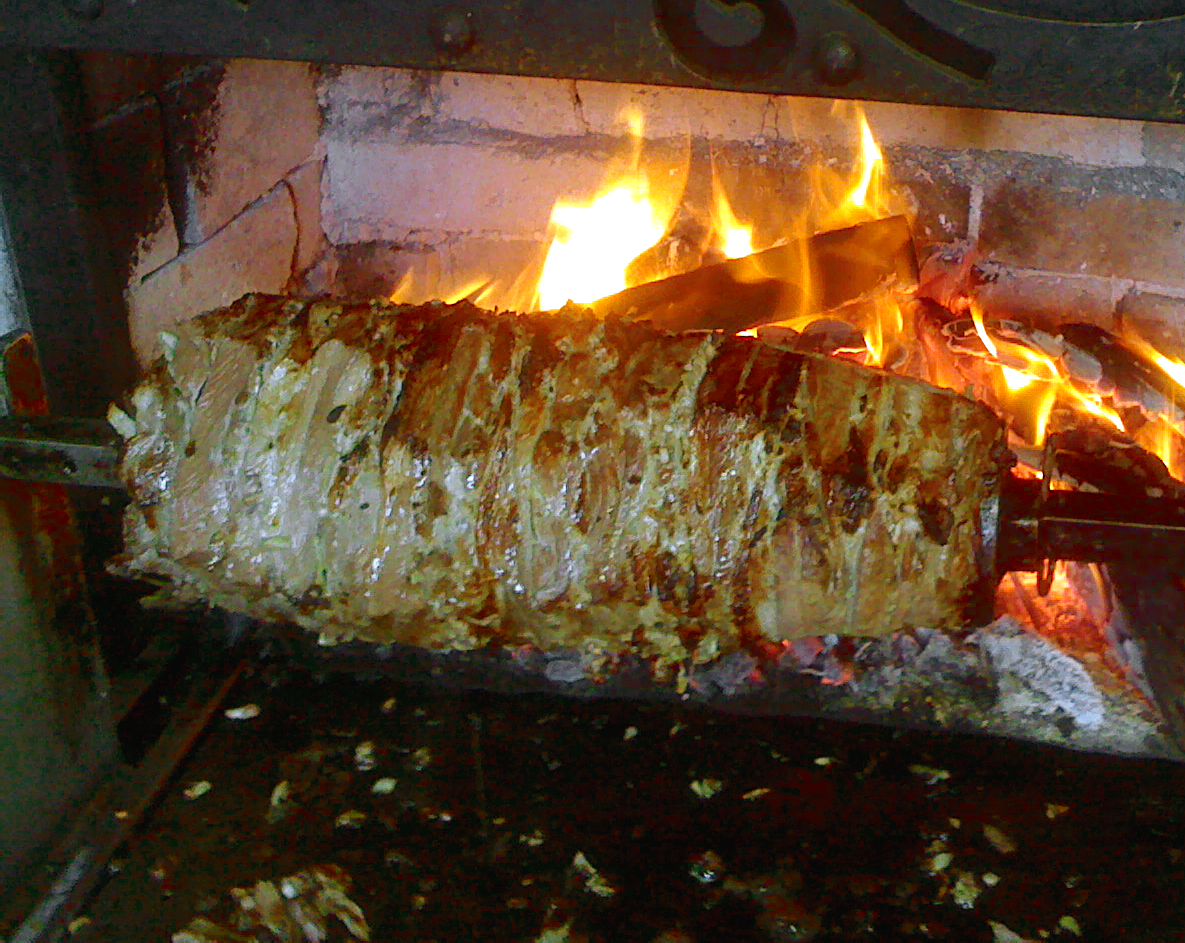
Cağ kebapı

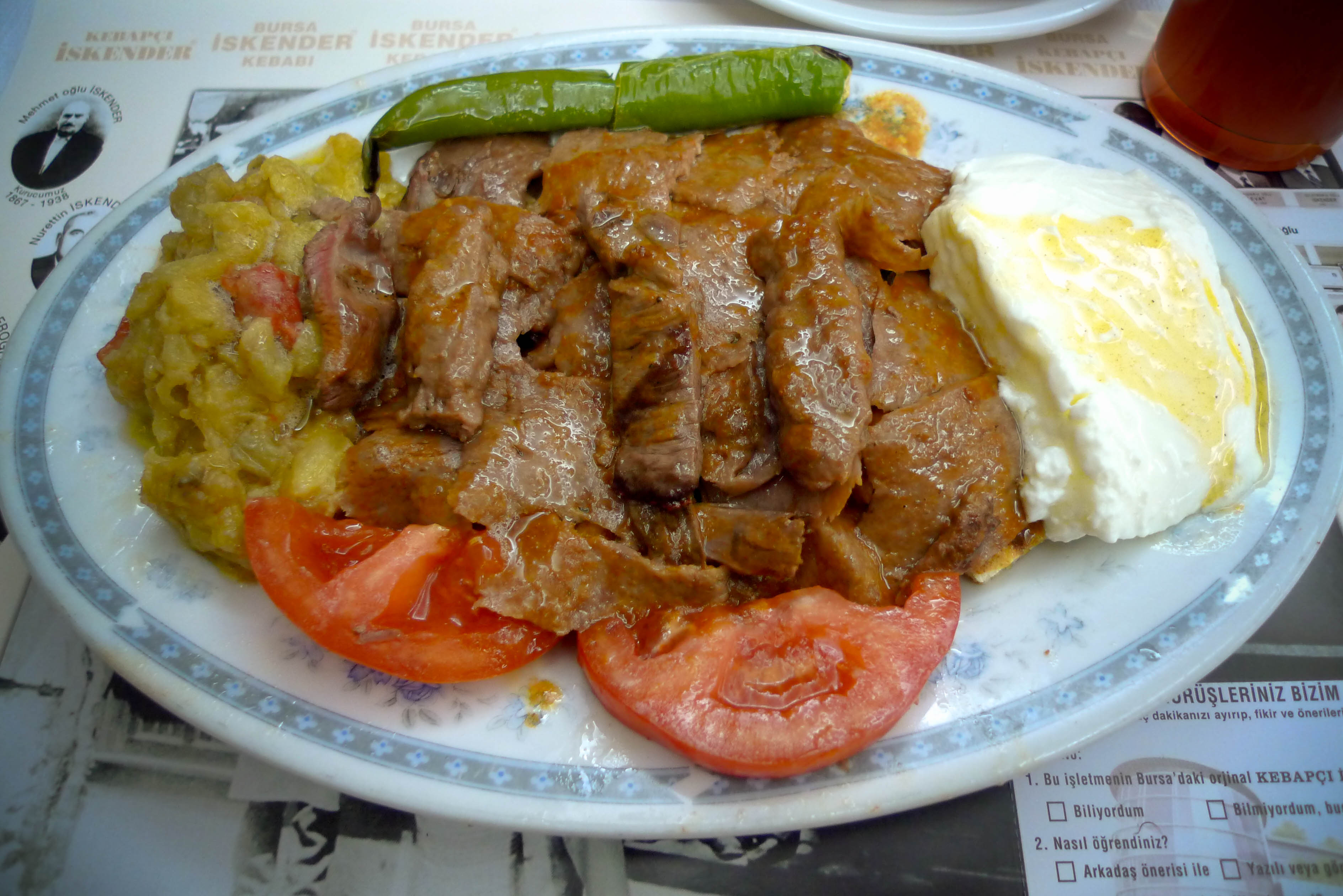
İskender kebab

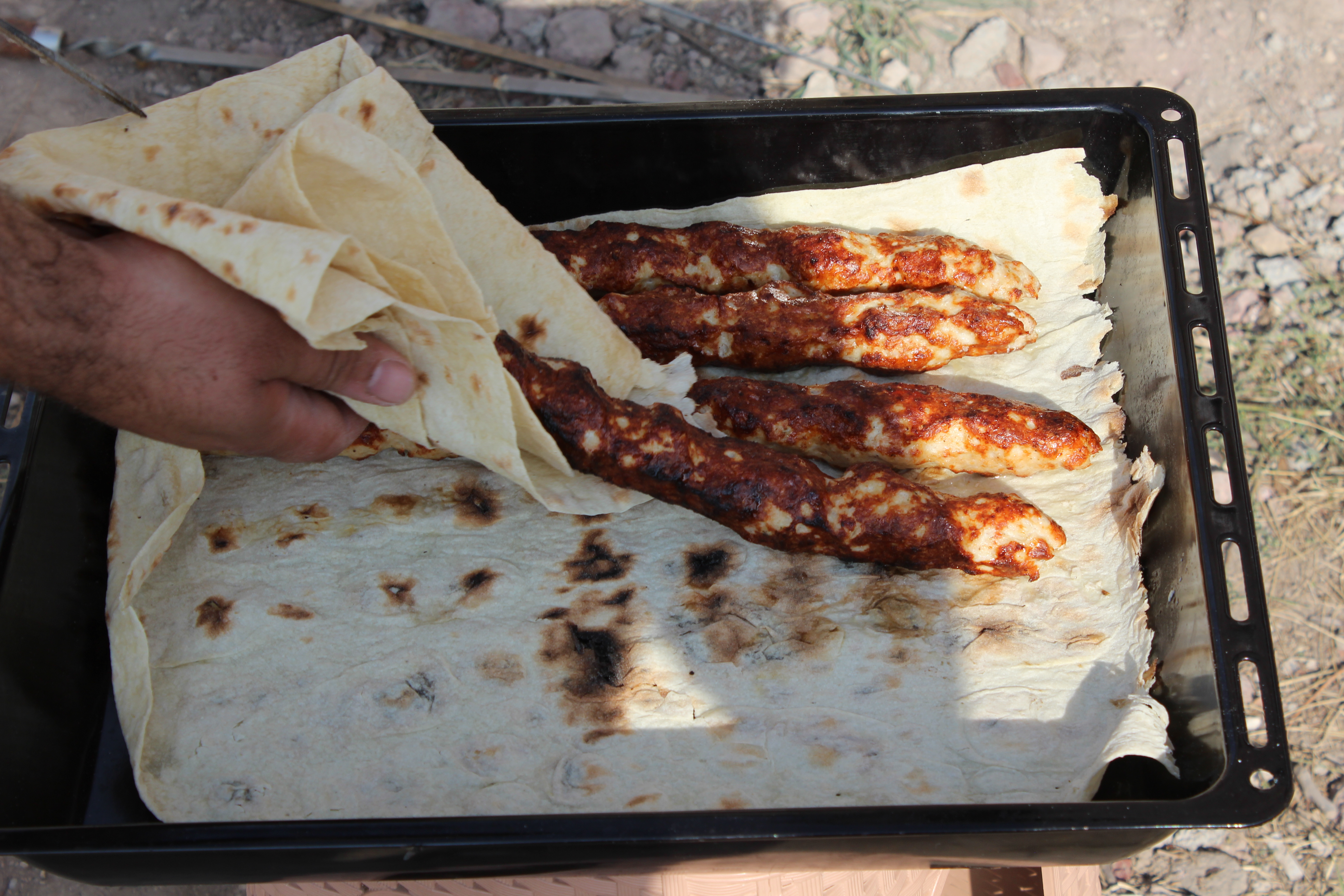
Kebab with lavash

- Adana kebabı (or kıyma kebabı) is a long, hand-minced meat kebab mounted on a wide iron skewer and grilled over charcoal. Named after the Turkish city of Adana, the kebab is generally "hot" or piquant. The traditional Adana kebab is made using lamb, with a high fatty content cooked over hot coals. Only three ingredients are used in a proper Adana kebab, minced lamb, red capsicum (pepper) and salt.
- Ali Paşa kebabı, "Ali Pasha kebab" – cubed lamb with tomato, onion and parsley wrapped in phyllo.
- Alinazik kebab – Ground meat kebab sautéed in a saucepan, with garlic, yogurt and eggplants added.
- Beyti kebab – Ground lamb or beef, seasoned and grilled on a skewer, often served wrapped in lavash and topped with tomato sauce and yogurt, traced back to the famous kebab house Beyti in Istanbul and particularly popular in Turkey's larger cities.
- Bostan kebabı – Lamb and aubergine casserole.
- Buğu kebabı – Steam kebab, is a Turkish stew which is cooked in a pan or an earthenware casserole. The casserole's lid is sealed in order to cook the meat in its own juices. The dish is prepared with pearl onions, garlic, thyme, and other spices. In Tekirdağ, it is served with cumin; in İzmir, it is served with mastic.
- Cağ kebabı, 'spoke kebab' – Cubes of lamb roasted first on a cağ (a horizontal rotating spit) and then on a skewer, a specialty of Erzurum region with recently rising popularity.
- Ciğer kebabı, 'liver kebab' - usually eaten with sliced onions, salad, and bread.
- Çökertme kebabı – Sirloin veal kebap stuffed with yogurt and potatoes.
- Çöp şiş, "small skewer kebab" – a speciality of Selçuk and Germencik near Ephesus, pounded boneless meat with tomatoes and garlic marinated with black pepper, thyme and oil on wooden skewers.
- Döner kebap, literally "rotating kebab" in Turkish, is sliced lamb, beef, or chicken, slowly roasted on a vertical rotating spit. The Middle Eastern shawarma, Mexican al pastor, and Greek gyros are all derived from the Turkish döner kebab, which was invented in Bursa in the 19th century. The German-style döner kebab sandwich, sometimes called simply "a kebab" in English, was introduced by Turkish immigrants in Berlin in the 1970s, and has become one of the most popular take-away foods in Germany and much of Europe. It is commonly sold by Turks and considered a Turkish-German specialty in Germany.
- Hünkâri kebabı, 'Sultan's kebab' – Sliced lamb meat mixed with patlıcan beğendi (aubergine purée), basil, thyme and bay leaf.
- İskender kebap – döner kebab served with yogurt, tomato sauce, and butter, originated in Bursa. This kebab was invented by İskender Efendi in 1867. He was inspired from Cağ kebab and turned it from horizontal to vertical.
- İslim kebabı, 'steamed kebab' – Another version of the aubergine kebab without its skin, marinated in sunflower oil.
- Kağıt kebabı – Lamb cooked in a paper wrapping.
- Kuzu şiş – Shish prepared with marinated milk-fed lamb meat.
- Manisa kebabı – This Manisa region version of the kebab is smaller and flat in size, made with shish meat on sliced pide, flavoured with butter, and stuffed with tomato, garlic, and green pepper.
- Eggplant kebab, aubergine kebab – Special kebap meat marinated in spices and served with eggplant (aubergine), hot pide bread and a yogurt sauce.
- Şiş kebap – is a dish consisting of small cubes of meat or fish threaded on a skewer and grilled. Şiş, pronounced [ʃiʃ], is a Turkish word meaning "sword" or "skewer". According to tradition, the dish was invented by medieval soldiers who used their swords to grill meat over open-field fires. In Turkey, shish kebab does not normally contain vegetables, though they may be cooked on a separate skewer. It can be prepared with lamb, beef, chicken, or fish, but pork is not used. The Pontian Greeks made a dish similar to shish kebabs, although theirs were cooked in a saucepan.
- Shish taouk – Yogurt-marinated chicken grilled on a stick.
- Testi kebapı, 'earthenware-jug kebab' – is a dish from Central Anatolia and the Mid-Western Black Sea region, consisting of a mixture of meat and vegetables cooked in a clay pot or jug over fire (testi means jug in Turkish). The pot is sealed with bread dough or foil and is broken when serving.

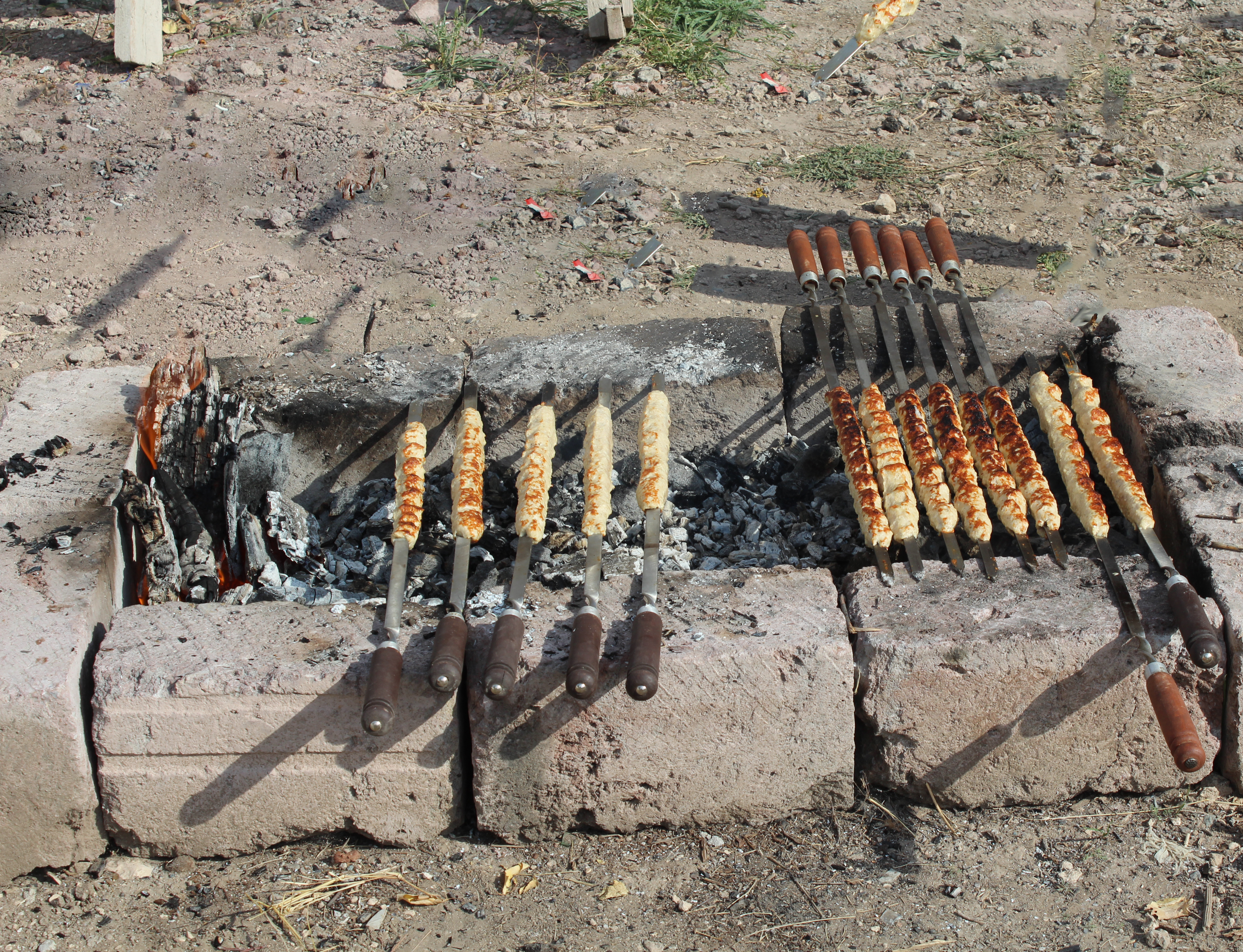
Preparation of Kebab in Armenia

=== South Asia ===
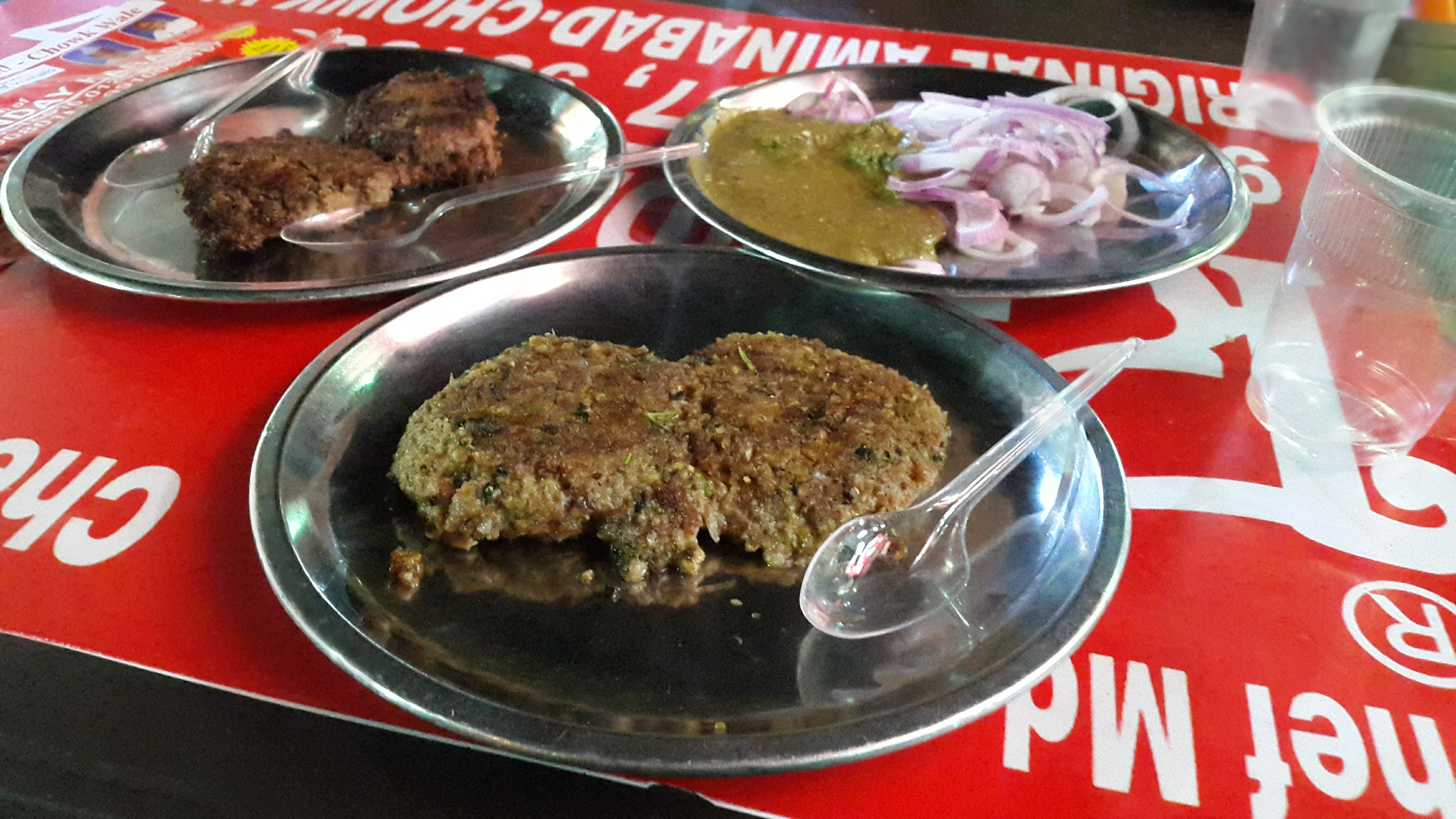
Galouti kebabs are native to the Awadh region of India and are popular in Indian subcontinental cuisine

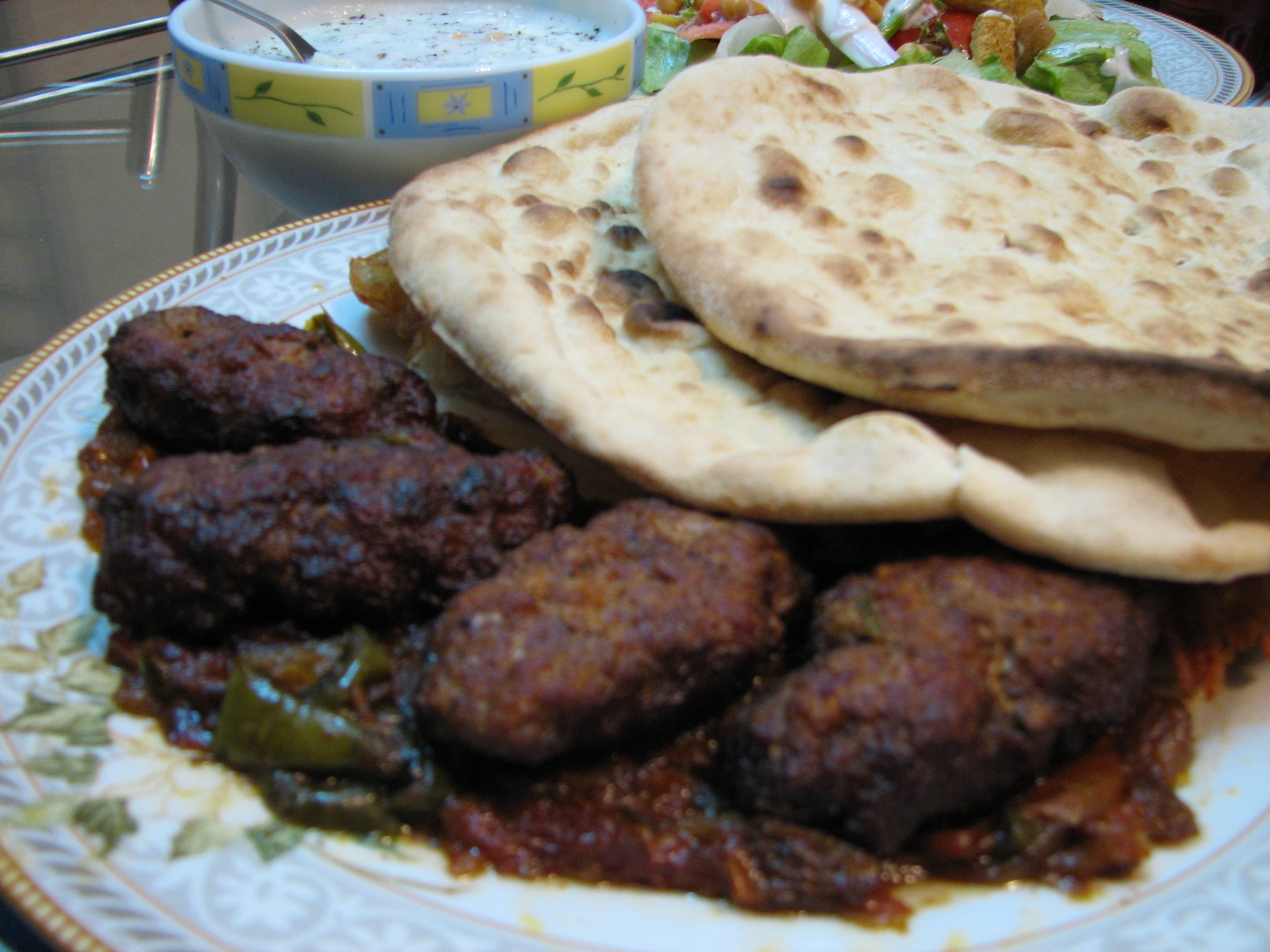
Kofta kebab with naan

South Asia has a rich kebab tradition with a great variety of different kebab dishes. Many modern kebabs in Indian subcontinental cuisine (Bangladeshi, Indian and Pakistani cuisine) trace their origins back to the time of the Mughals and the strong influence of Mughlai cuisine in medieval India, that persists to this day. Kebab dishes common to one or more of these countries include:

- Tandoori kebab (Urdu: تندوری کباب, Hindi: तंदूरी कबाब)
- Naga doner kebab
- Kathi Kebab (including Porota Kababs, kebab wraps)
- Shami kebab (Urdu: شامی کباب, Hindi: शमी कबाब) – a Shami kebab is a small patty of minced beef or chicken and ground chickpeas and spices.
- Seekh kebab (Urdu: سيخ کباب, Hindi: सीख़ कबाब) – a long skewer of beef mixed with herbs and seasonings, it takes its name from the skewer.
- Tunde ke kabab (Urdu: ٹنڈے کے کباب, Hindi: टुंडे के कबाब) – tunde ke kebab, also known as Galouti kebab, is a small patty of minced beef or chicken native to the Awadh region of India.
- Bun kebab (Urdu: بن کباب, Hindi: बन कबाब) – a unique kebab sandwich with beef, lamb, fish or chicken.
- Chapli kebab (Urdu: چپلی کباب, Hindi: चपली कबाब) – a spiced, tangy round kebab made of ground beef and cooked in animal fat. A speciality of Peshawar in Khyber-Pakhtunkhwa and now found across the Indian subcontinent.
- Bihari kebab (Urdu: بہاری کباب, Hindi: बिहारी कबाब) – skewer of beef mixed with herbs and seasoning native to the Bihar region of India.
- Kalmi kebab (Urdu: کلمی کباب, Hindi: कलमी कबाब)
- Sheesh kebab (Urdu: شیش کباب, Hindi: शीश कबाब)
- Burrah kebab – made from goat or lamb chops, liberally marinated with spices and charcoal grilled.

Eaten in the Indian subcontinent, the tikkia is a related food, though these are often made from potatoes (known as aaloo).

==== Afghanistan ====
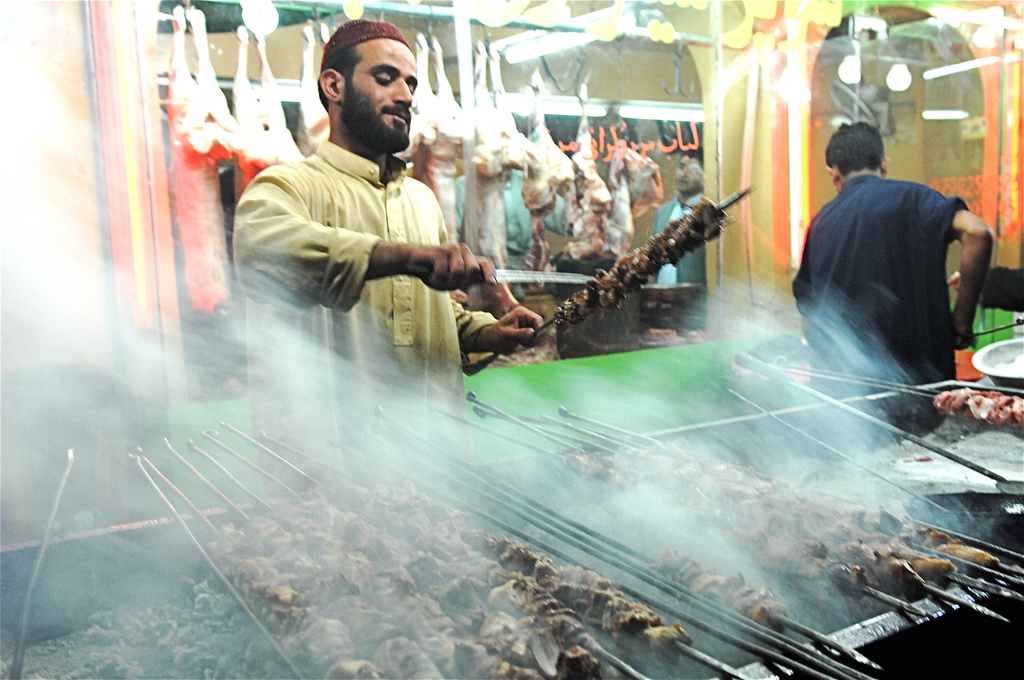
Chopan kebab being prepared in Afghanistan

Afghan kebab (Pashto/Dari: کباب) is most often found in restaurants and outdoor vendor stalls. The most widely used meat is lamb. Recipes differ with every restaurant. In Afghan cuisine, kebab is served with naan, rarely rice, and customers have the option to sprinkle sumac or ghora, dried ground sour grapes, on their kebab. The quality of kebab is solely dependent on the quality of the meat. Pieces of fat from the sheep's tail (jijeq) are usually added with the lamb skewers to add extra flavor.

Other popular kebabs include the lamb chop, ribs, beef, buffalo, and chicken.

Chapli kebab, a specialty of Eastern Afghanistan, is a patty made from beef mince. It is prepared flat and round, and served with naan. The original recipe of chapli kebab dictates a half meat (or less), half flour mixture, which renders it lighter in taste and less expensive.

==== Bangladesh ====
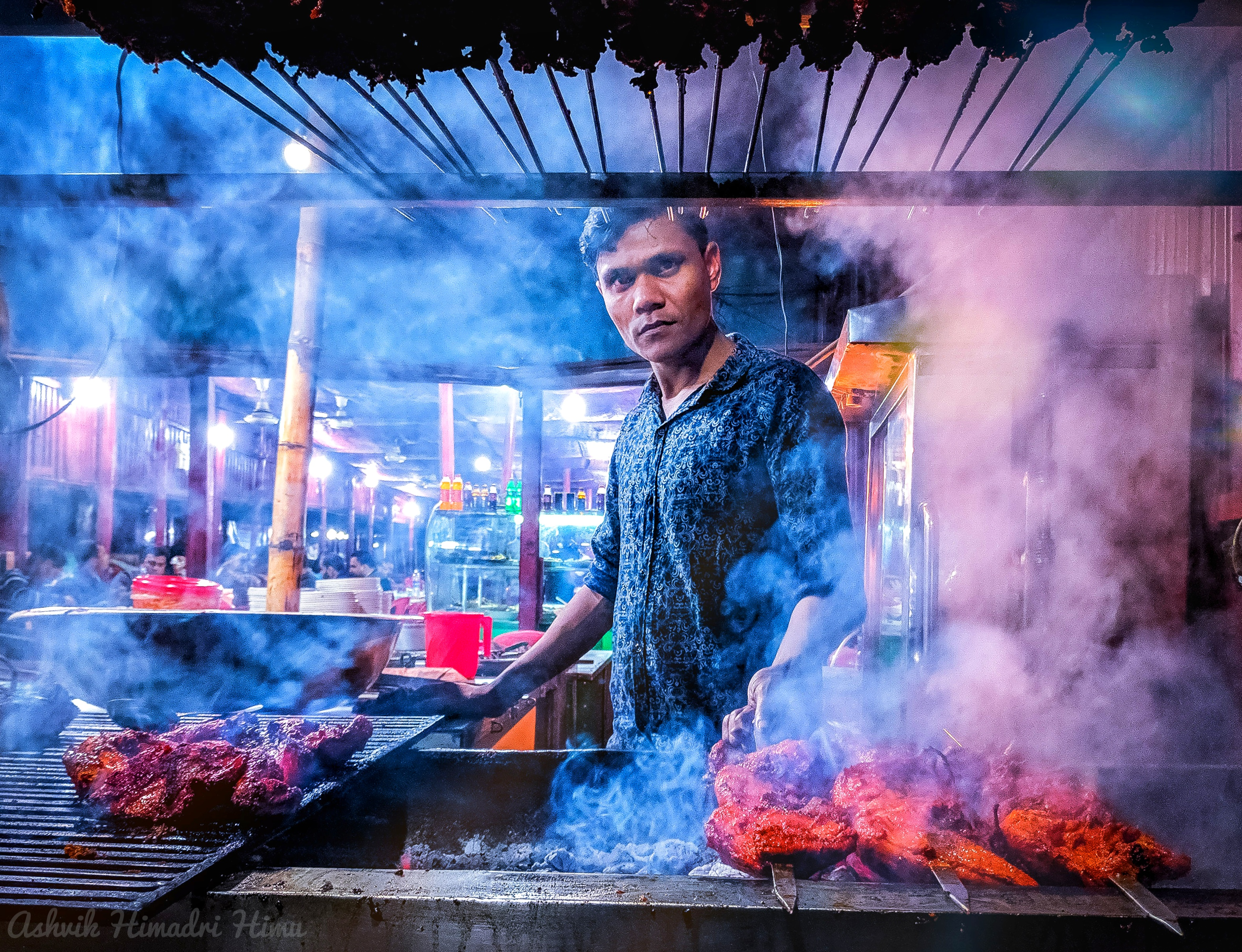
A kebab shop in Dhaka, Bangladesh

In Bangladesh they make variations of kebab (Bengali কাবাব or "Kabab"). In the old Mughal province of Bengal Subah's capital of Dhaka, various Pakistani and Indian-influenced dishes started to be made. Amongst these were kebabs. In Bangladeshi cuisine, most kebabs are made using fish or beef.

==== India ====
Indian kebabs feature in various cuisines of the country, such as Awadhi cuisine; a number of them developed under the influence of Mughlai cuisine in the medieval era. Certain kebabs of India have very specific geographic attributions, such as Kakori kebab, which is made of finely ground, soft mince and attributed to the city of Kakori in Uttar Pradesh, where legend has it that it was first prepared for old and toothless pilgrims. Galouti kebab is native to the Awadh region of India.

==== Pakistan ====
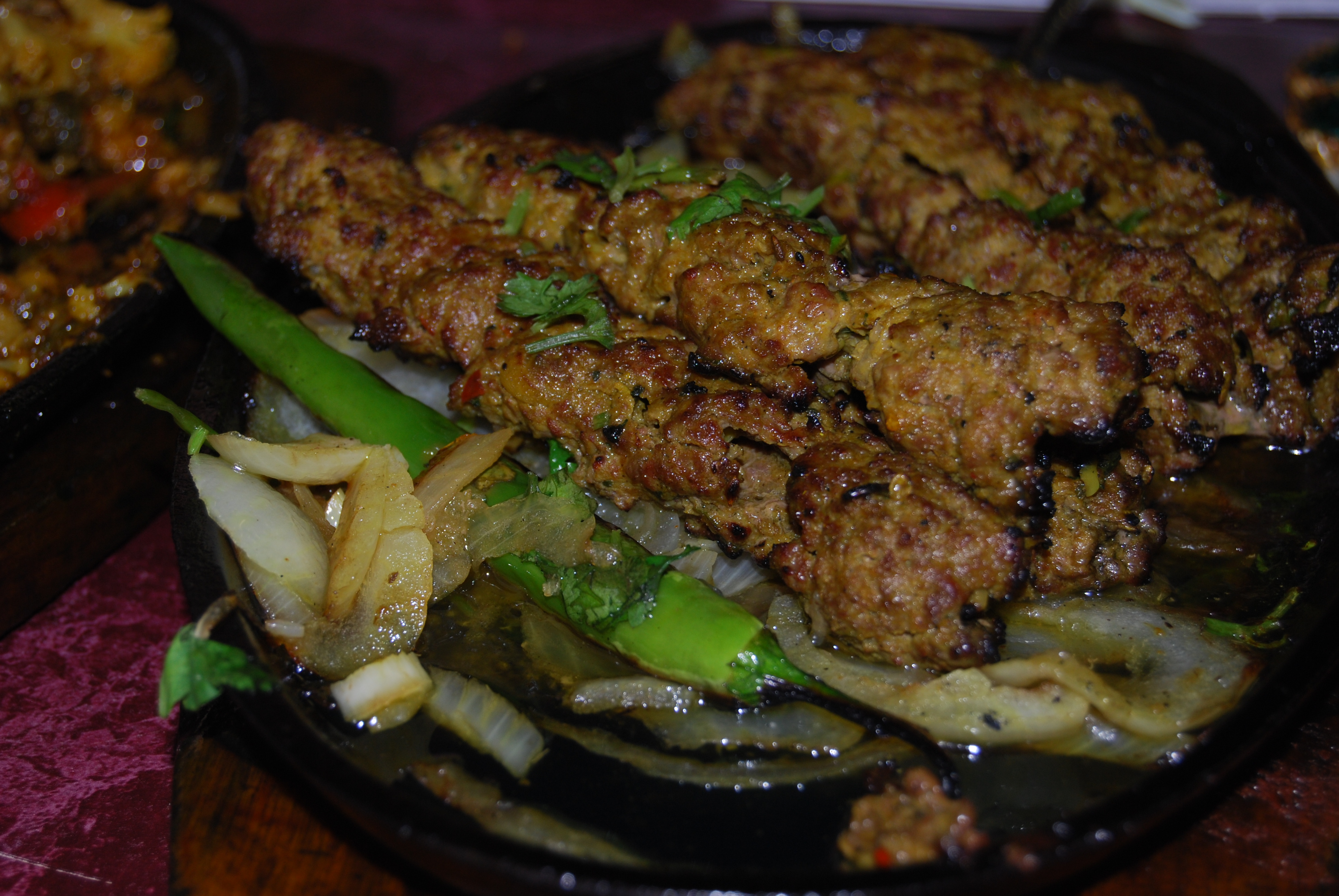
Pakistani-style seekh kebabs

In Pakistan, kebabs trace their origins to the time of the Mughals' Mughlai cuisine, and their influence on the cuisine of modern-day Pakistan. There are all sorts of kebab varieties such as seekh, chapli, shammi and other forms of roasted and grilled meats. As Pakistan is a predominantly Muslim country, pork is not used. Instead, meats like beef, chicken, lamb, fish, and sometimes buff, are used in the making of kebabs.

=== Southeast Asia ===
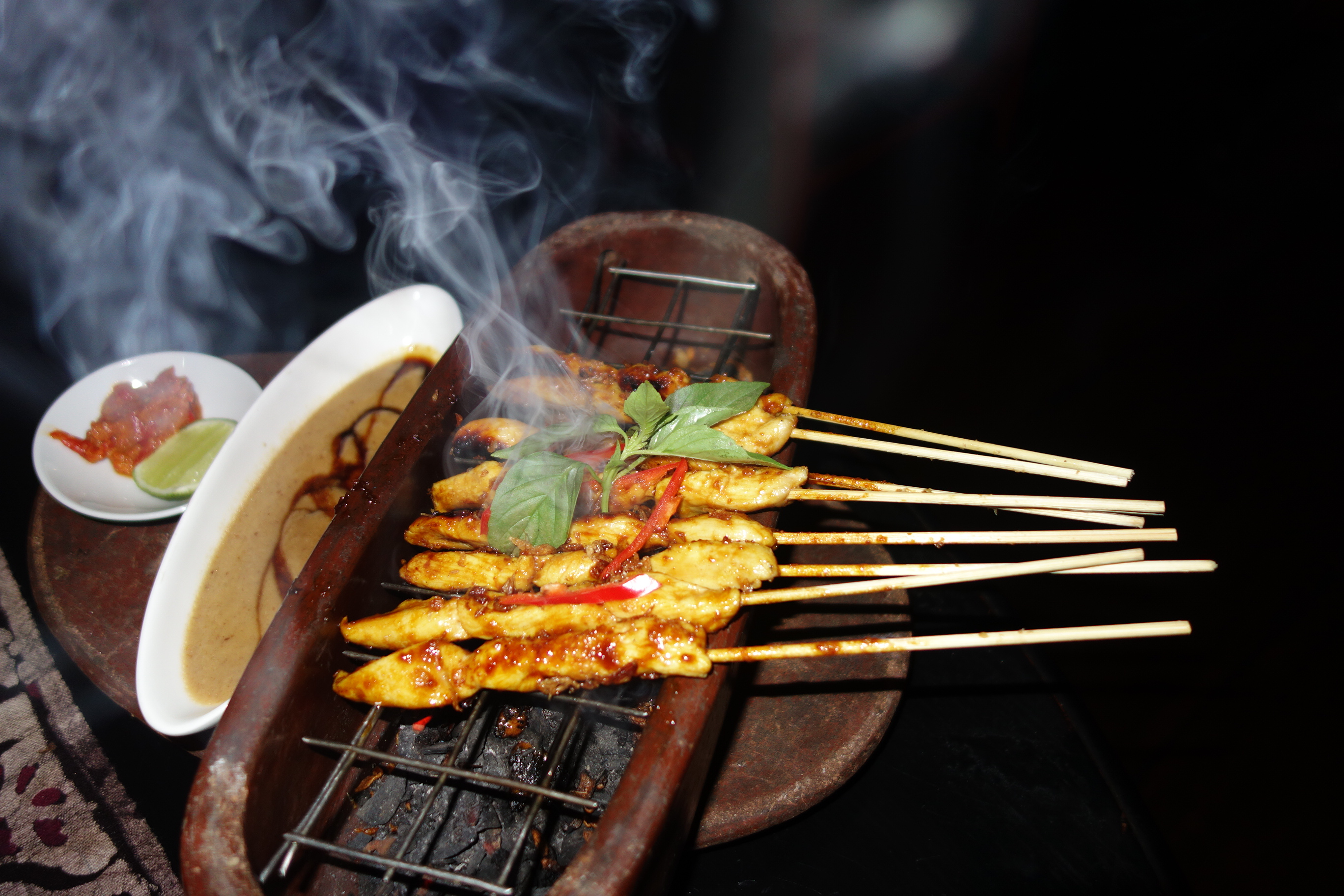
Grilled chicken satay served with peanut sauce in Jakarta

Satay is a kebab of seasoned, skewered, and grilled meat, served with a sauce. It is a dish of Southeast Asia, particularly Indonesia, Malaysia, Philippines, and Thailand.

Satay may consist of diced or sliced chicken, goat, lamb, mutton, beef, pork, fish, other meats, or tofu. Traditionally skewers from the midrib of the coconut palm frond are used, although bamboo skewers are often used instead. It is grilled or barbecued over a wood or charcoal fire with spicy seasonings. It may be served with various sauces, though most often a combination of soy and peanut sauce. Hence, peanut sauce is often called satay sauce.

Satay was developed by Javanese street vendors as a unique adaptation of Indian kebab. The introduction of satay, and other now-iconic dishes such as tongseng and gulai kambing based on meats such as goat and lamb, coincided with an influx of Indian and Arab traders and immigrants starting in the 18th century. It is available almost anywhere in Indonesia, where it has become a national dish. In Sri Lanka, it has become a staple of the local diet as a result of the influences from the local Malay community.

=== Sub-Saharan Africa ===
==== East Africa ====
Mshikaki is a traditional Kebab cooked on skewers which is a common and popular food item across East Africa.

==== South Africa ====
Sosatie (plural sosaties) is a traditional South African dish of meat (usually lamb or mutton) cooked on skewers. The term derives from sate ("skewered meat") and saus (spicy sauce). It is of Cape Malay origin. Sosatie recipes vary, but commonly the ingredients can include cubes of lamb, beef, chicken, dried apricots, red onions and mixed peppers.

==== West Africa ====
Suya is a spicy kebab which is a popular food item in West Africa that originated in Nigeria. It is traditionally prepared by the Hausa people of Nigeria, Cameroon, Niger, Ghana, and some parts of Sudan (where it is called agashe).

Kyinkyinga is common and popular in West Africa. It is a Ghanaian dish, very similar to or synonymous with the Hausa suya kebab, also known as sooya, tsinga, chichinga, tsire agashi, chachanga, or tankora.

== Other variants ==
=== Ćevapi ===
Ćevapi (pronounced [tɕɛv̞ǎːpi]) or ćevapčići (formal diminutive, [tɕɛv̞ǎptʃitɕi], ћевапчићи), which comes from the word kebab, is a grilled dish of minced meat, a type of skinless sausage, found traditionally in the countries of southeastern Europe (the Balkans). They are considered a national dish in Bosnia and Herzegovina and Serbia and are also common in Croatia, Kosovo, Montenegro, Albania, Slovenia, as well as in North Macedonia, Bulgaria, Romania. Ćevapi has its origins in Bosnia and Herzegovina during the Ottoman period, and represents a regional specialty similar to the kofte kebab. A dish with similar origins in Romania is called mititei.

=== Pinchitos ===
Pinchitos or Pinchos Morunos is a Moorish-derived kebab dish in Spanish cuisine. The name pinchitos is used in the southern Spanish autonomous communities of Andalusia and Extremadura. They consist of small cubes of meat threaded onto a skewer (Spanish: pincho) which are traditionally cooked over charcoal braziers. Similar dishes in North Africa or other Muslim majority countries tend to be lamb-based, but pork and chicken are the most popular meats for the dish in Spain. Pinchitos are also extremely popular in Venezuela, due to the heavy influence Spain had in Venezuelan cuisine during many years.

=== Shashlik ===
Shashlik is similar to, or sometimes a synonym for, shish kebab. It is popular in many countries, particularly in Eastern and Central Europe, the Caucasus, and the Baltics. In non-Muslim-majority countries, shashlik and equivalent dishes like Romanian frigărui may sometimes be prepared with pork.

=== Vegetarian kebab ===
A vegetarian kebab is a kebab made without meat. It can be made with several meat alternatives, including soya protein and cheese.

== Kebab in Western cultures ==
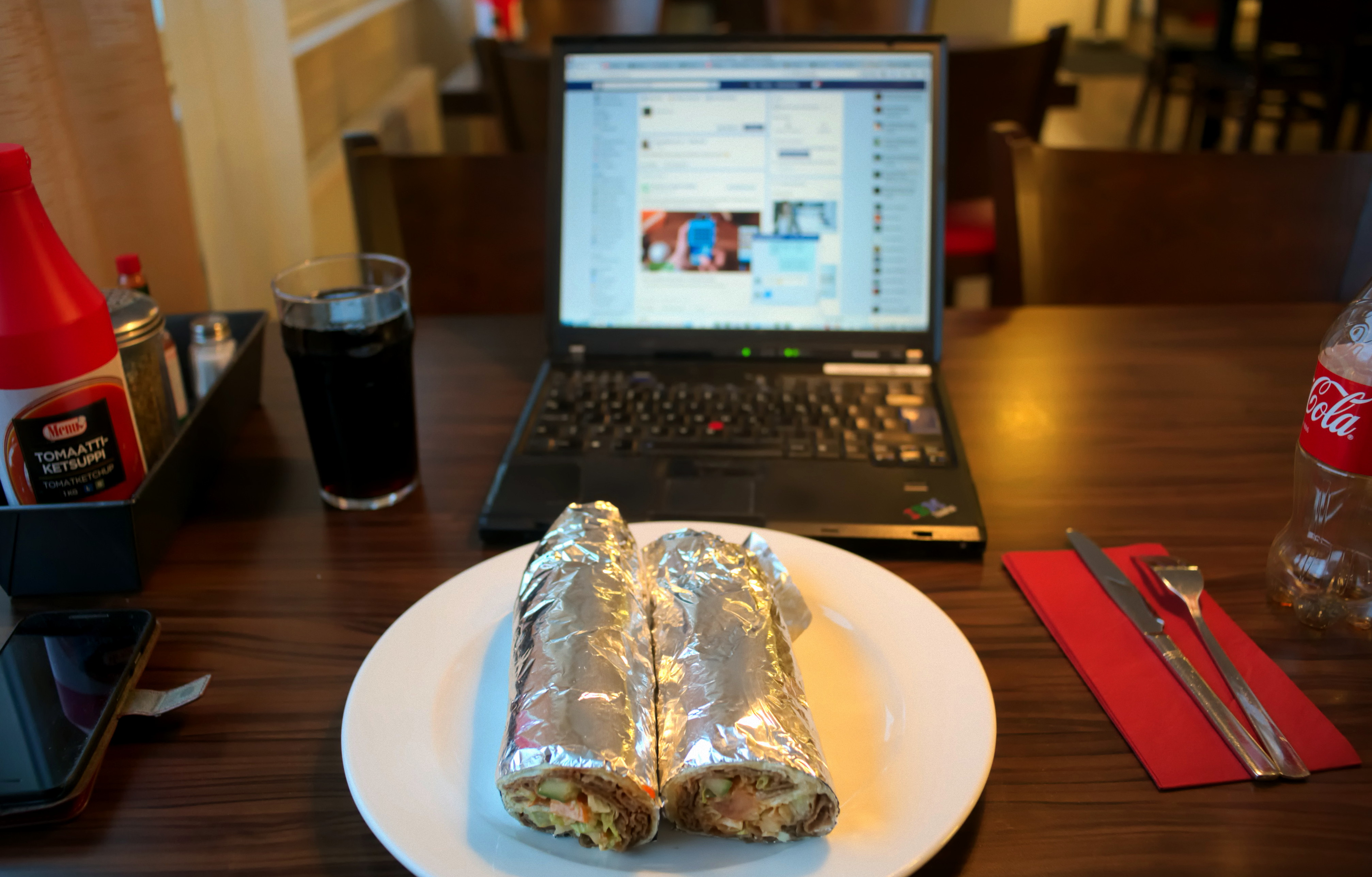
Rullakebab, a roll wrapped kebab in Lappeenranta, Finland

Kebab cuisine has spread around the world together with Muslim influence. Although non-Muslim Westerners may be increasingly familiar with some of the many other international kebab dishes, only two have become an established and widely popular part of the culture in many Western countries. In English, the word kebab commonly refers to shish kebab and, outside of North America, to döner kebab or related fast-food dishes. These dishes are also served in many other countries, where they may have different names.

Kebabs have also met opposition: in Italy, several cities banned kebab shops to preserve Italian culinary culture. Many protested against these bans as "racist". Kebabs have also been invoked in anti-immigrant rhetoric, especially in online contexts, such as the "remove kebab" slogan.

=== Shish kebab ===
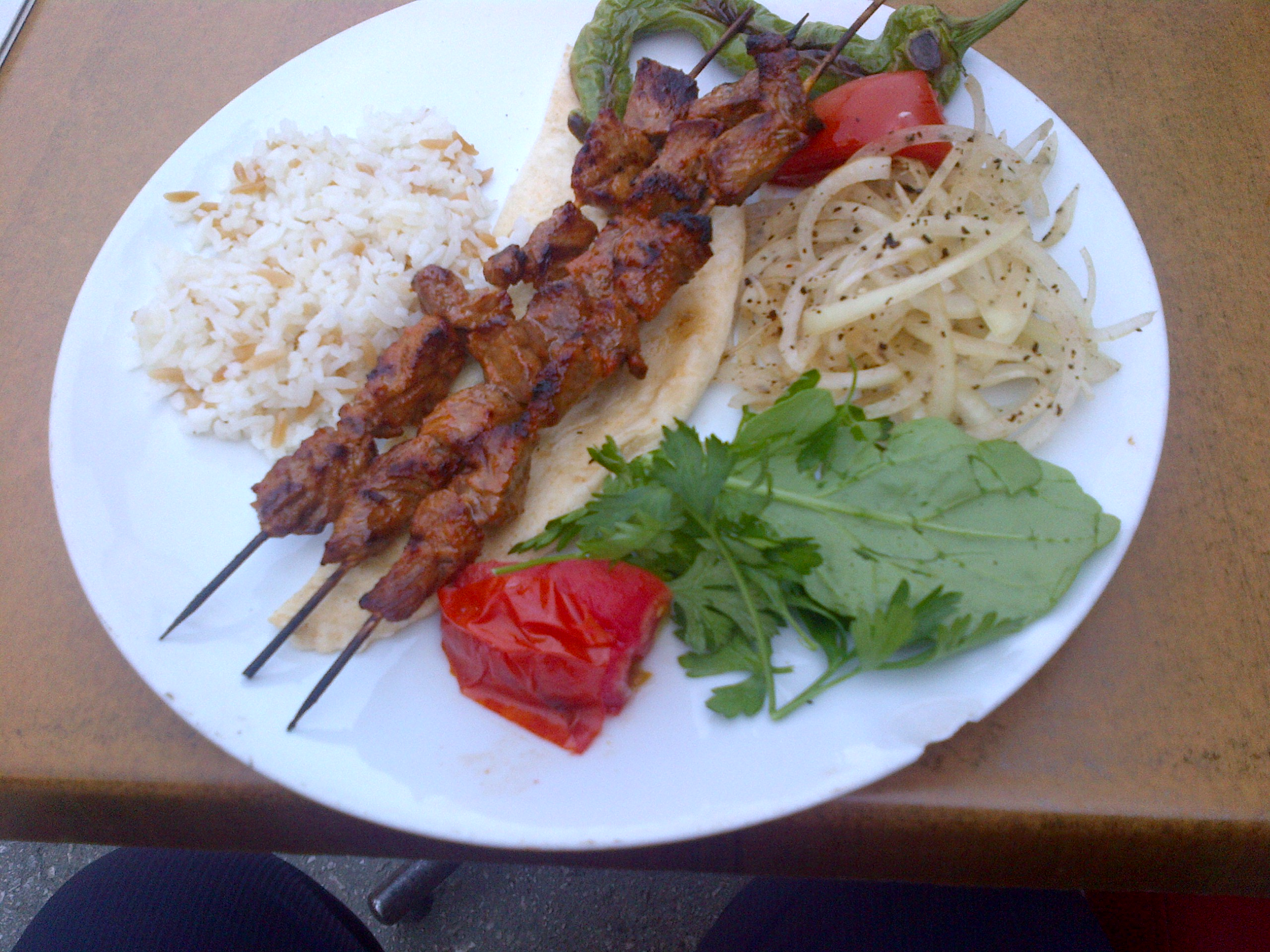
Shish kebab on a plate

In English, kebab, or in North America also kabob, often occurring as shish kebab, is now a culinary term for small pieces of meat cooked on a skewer. The word kebab, most likely derived from Persian, has been used with various spellings in this sense since at least the 17th century, while the Oxford English Dictionary records the earliest known publication of the term shish kebab, derived from Turkish: şiş kebap, in 1914.

Two etymologies have been suggested for shish kabob in the Persian dictionary of Dehkhoda: shish being the Persian word "shish" for the number six, which refers to the original six pieces of meat of a standard kabob skewer, or "shish" being derived from Late Middle Persian "Sich" meaning skewer. The word "kabob" is most probably derived from the Arhameic word kbābā (to roast). In many English-speaking countries, it refers to the now well-known dish prepared with marinated meat or seafood together with vegetables such as onions, tomatoes, and bell peppers threaded onto the skewer, also sometimes known as shashlik. This preparation is different from the typical Turkish shish kebab style, where vegetables are usually cooked on a separate skewer. Shish kebabs are customarily prepared in homes and restaurants, and are usually cooked on a grill or barbecue, or roasted in an oven.

The word kebab may also be used as a general term in English to describe any similar-looking skewered food, such as brochette, satay, souvlaki, yakitori, or numerous small chunks of any type of food served on a stick. This is different from its use in the West Asia, where shish (Persian/Mazandarani: شیش, Turkish: şiş) is the word for skewer, while kebab comes from the word for grilling.

=== Doner kebab ===
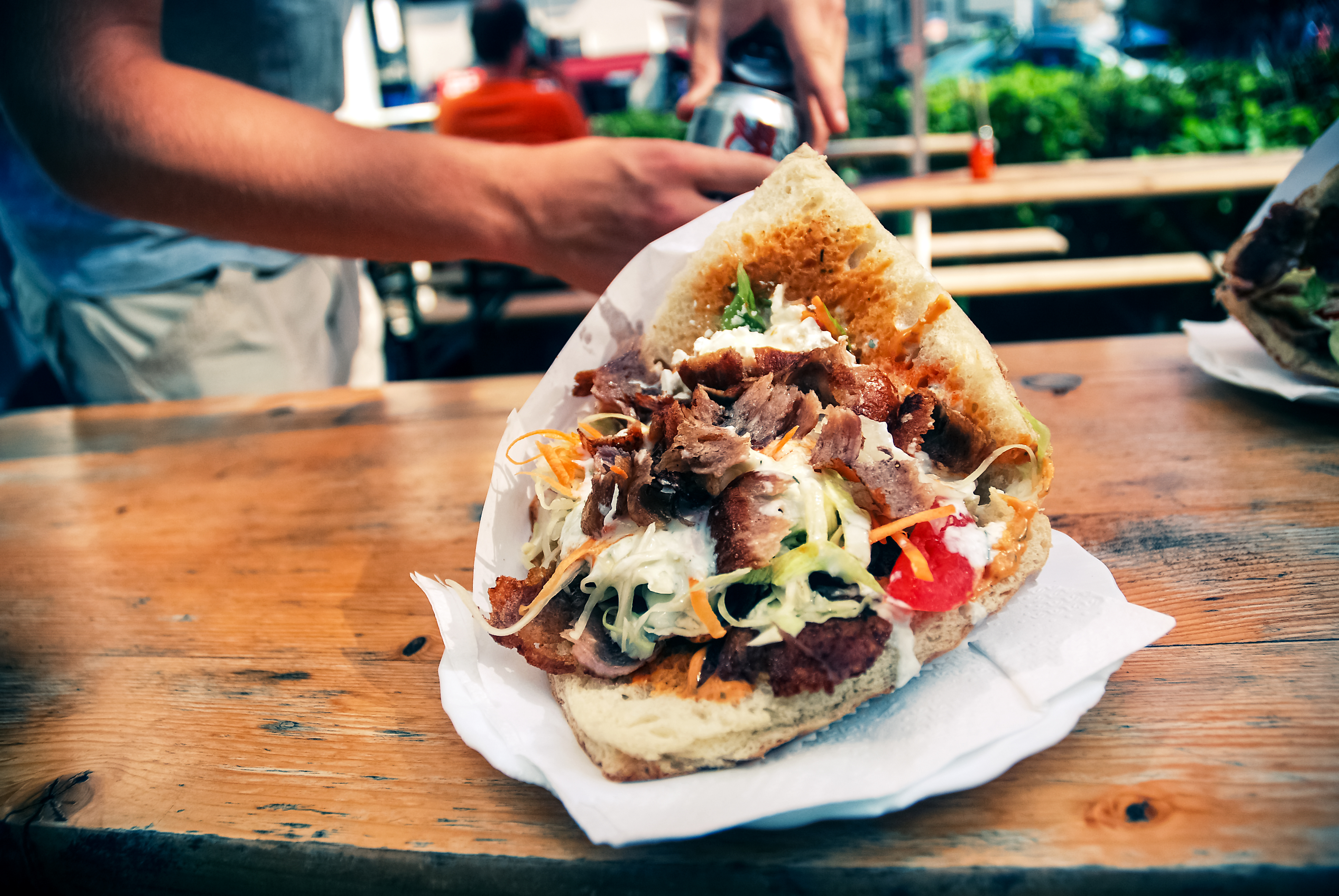
German-style döner

English speakers from countries outside North America may also use the word kebab generally to mean the popular fast food version of the Turkish döner kebab, or the related shawarma or gyros, and the sandwiches made with them, available from kebab shops as take-away meals. This usage may be found in some non-English parts of Europe as well. In North America, the Greek variant gyros is most widely known.

The döner kebab originated in 19th-century Turkey, but it became widely popular in the West only in the latter half of the 20th century. Many layers of meat are stacked onto a large vertical rotating spit; the outer surface is gradually cooked and sliced off, and typically served either mixed or topped with vegetables and sauces in a sandwich made with pita or other flatbreads. Certain regional variants also include cheeses. Sandwiches served in the same manner, but with other meats or cheese, may also sometimes be called a "kebab". It is available in most parts of Europe, and many other countries, though sometimes with different names or serving styles. In Germany, the highly popular sandwich, introduced by Turkish immigrants, is called a döner, though Arab shops there serve shawarma.

== Similar dishes ==
Americas

- City chicken (U.S.)
- Spiedies (New York State)
- Anticuchos (Andean)
- Espetinho (Brazilian)

Africa

- Sosatie (South African)
- Suya (Nigerian)
- Kyinkyinga (Ghanaian)
- Mshikaki (Kenyan)

Asia

- Chuan (Chinese)
- Kkochi and jeok (Korean)
- Kushiyaki and kushikatsu (Japanese)
- Satay (Indonesian, Malaysian, Singaporean and Thai)

Europe

- Kebakko (Finnish)
- Brochette (French)
- Espetada (Portuguese)
- Souvlaki (Σουβλάκι; Greek)
- Arrosticini (Italian)
- Pinchitos (Spanish)
- Shashlik (Шашлык; Russian)

== See also ==
- Kazakh cuisine
- List of barbecue dishes
- List of kebabs
- List of spit-roasted foods
- Ottoman cuisine
- Syrian cuisine
- Uzbek cuisine
- Tandoori chicken
