= Seekh kebab =

Type of skewered kebab

Seekh Kebab
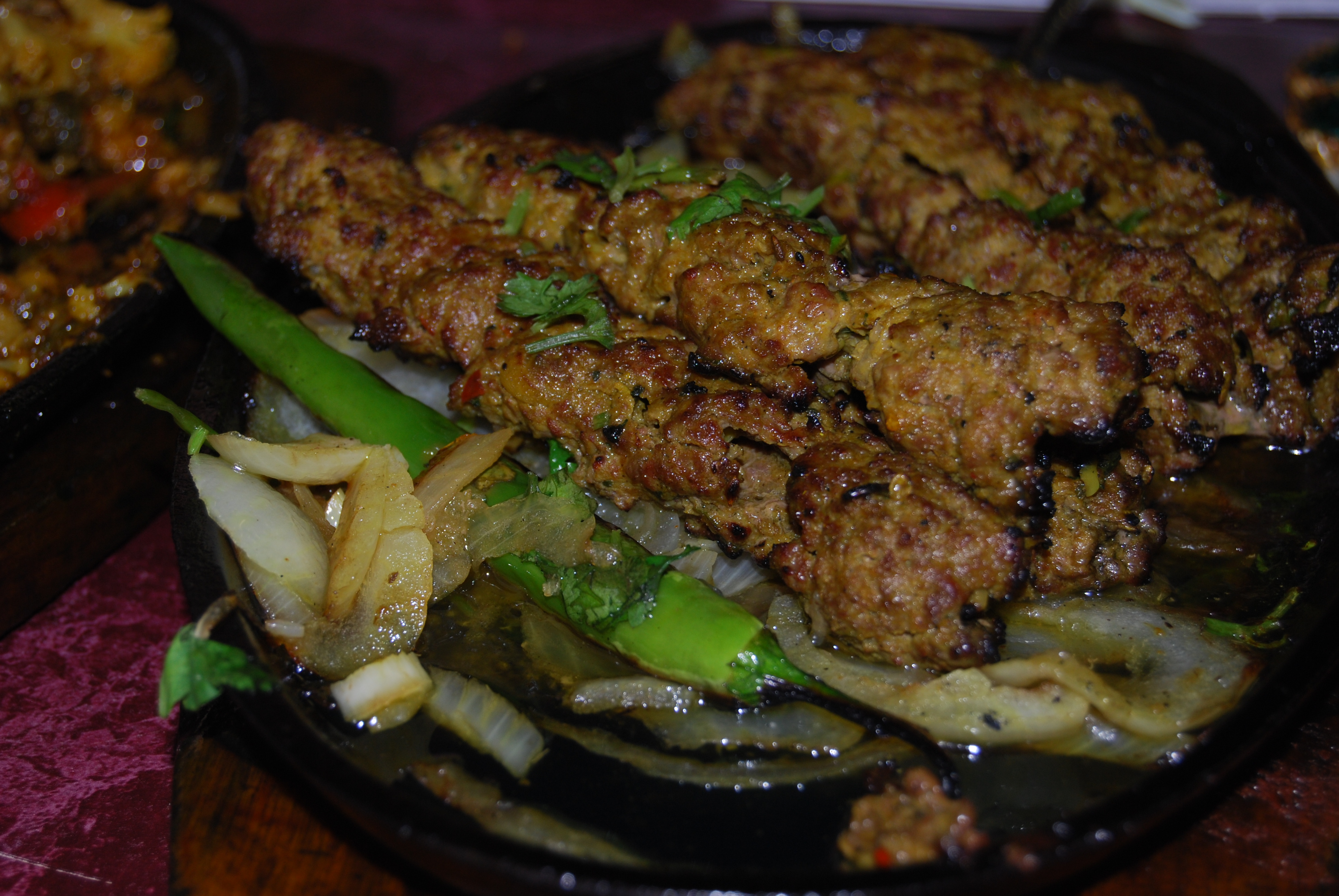
- Seekh kebabs served on a plate.
- Course: Main course
- Place of origin: Indian subcontinent
- Region or state: Indian subcontinent
- Associated cuisine: Bangladesh, India, Pakistan
- Serving temperature: Hot
- Main ingredients: Indian spices, spiced minced or ground meat, usually lamb, beef, or chicken

Seekh kebab is a type of kebab from the Indian subcontinent. It is made with Indian spices, spiced minced or ground meat, usually lamb, beef, or chicken, formed into cylinders on skewers and grilled. It is typically cooked on a mangal or barbecue, or in a tandoor. Seekh kebabs are prepared in homes and restaurants throughout the Indian subcontinent.

== Description ==
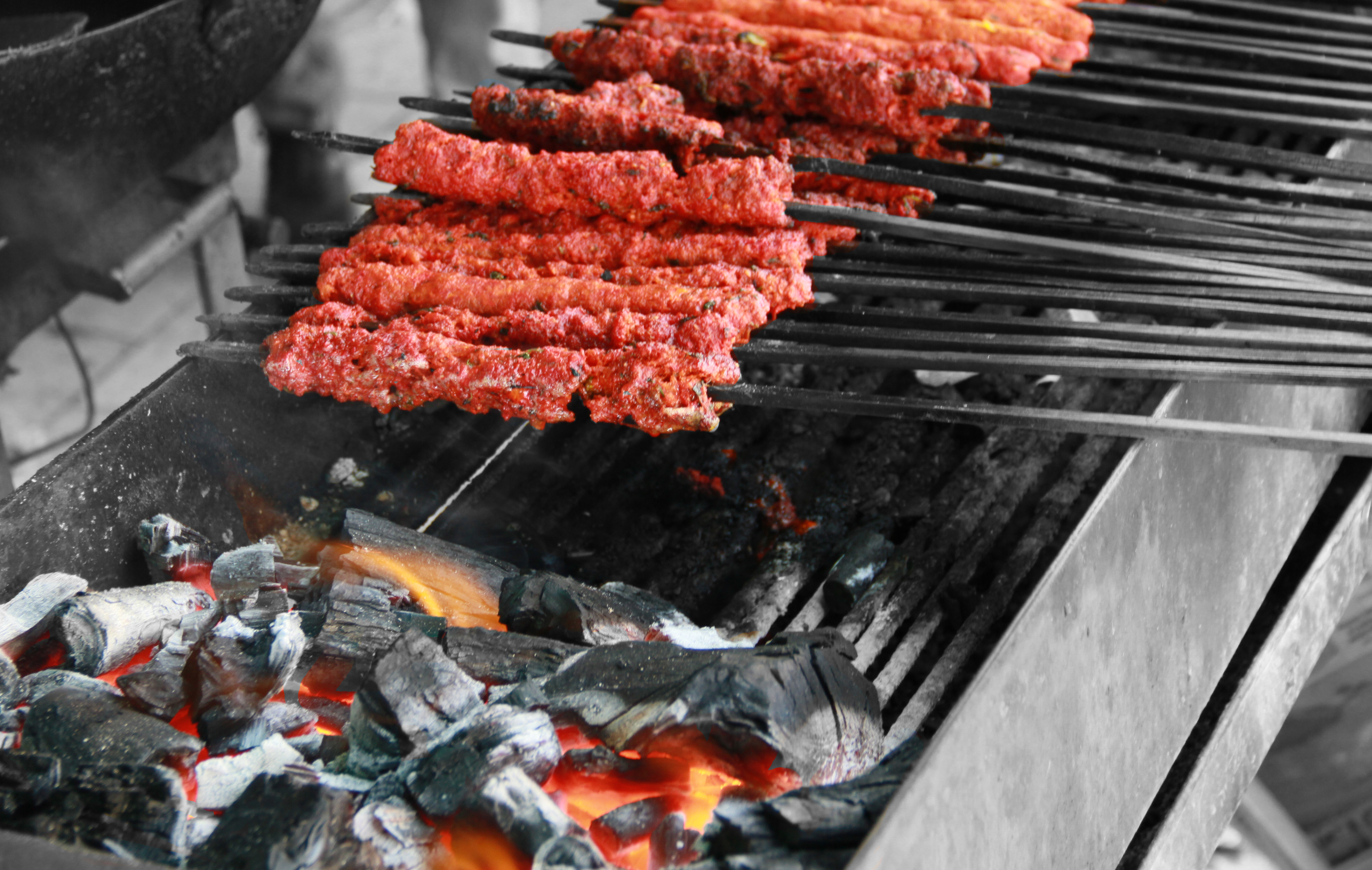
Raw seekh kebabs ready to be grilled, Russell Market, Bengaluru, India

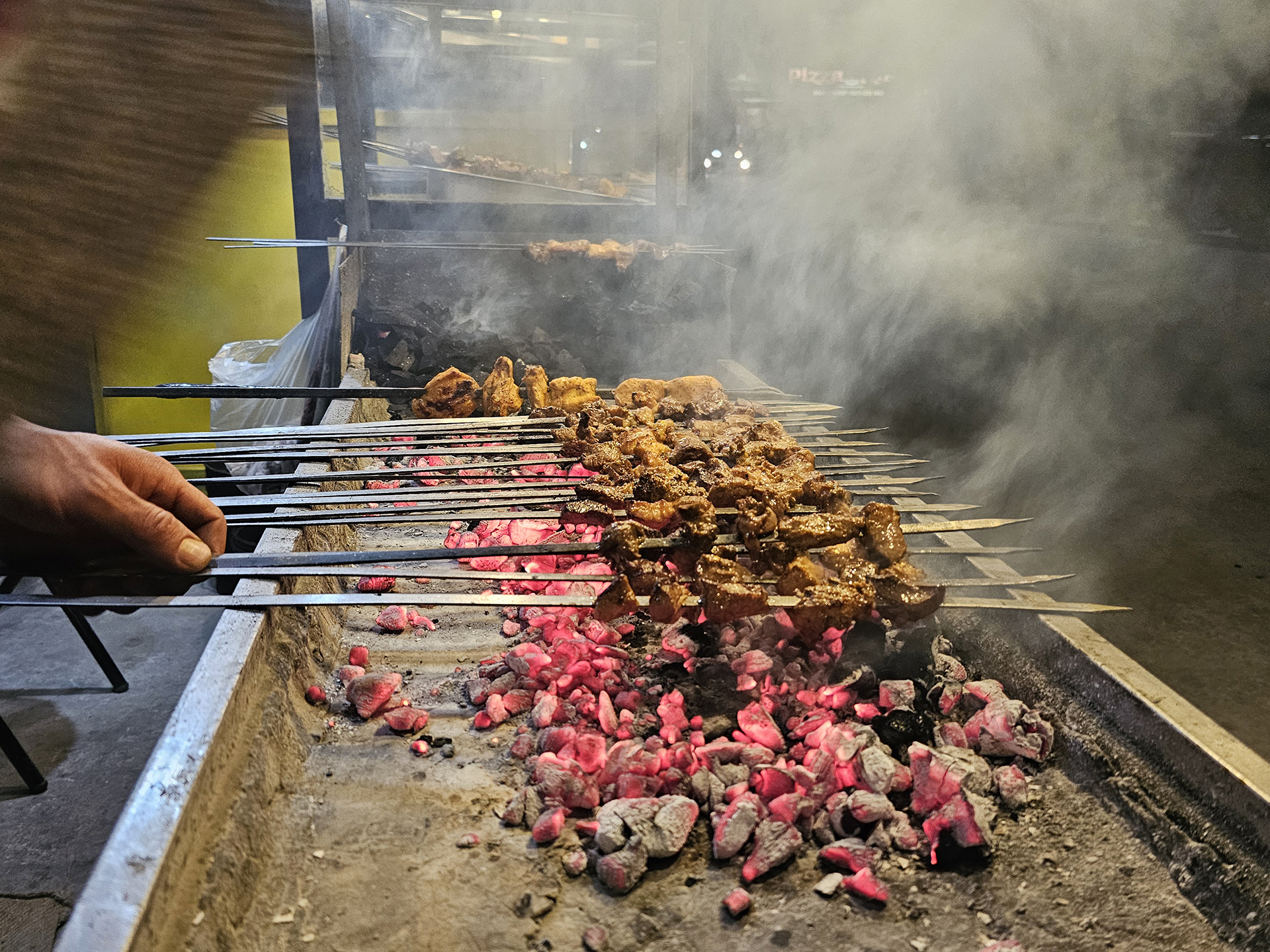
Seekh kebabs being sold at a street stall in Karimabad, Hunza, Pakistan

Seekh kebabs are soft and succulent, seasoned with various spices such as ginger, garlic, green chilli pepper, powdered chilli and garam masala, as well as lemon juice, coriander (cilantro) and mint leaves. Sometimes extra fats are added to further enhance the flavor. Seekh kebabs are typically served with raita, salad, onion slices, lemon wedges or green chutney and eaten with naans or parathas.

Some well-known seekh kebab variants are gola kabab, tunde ke kabab, kakori kebab and gilafi seekh kebab. Vegetarian seekh kebabs common in India are made with beans, carrots, potatoes, cauliflower and green peas.

== See also ==
- Shish kebab
- Kabab koobideh
- Kofta
- List of kebabs
- Mititei
- Sausage
- Souvlaki
- Shish kofta
