= Sosatie =

South African dish of meat cooked on skewers

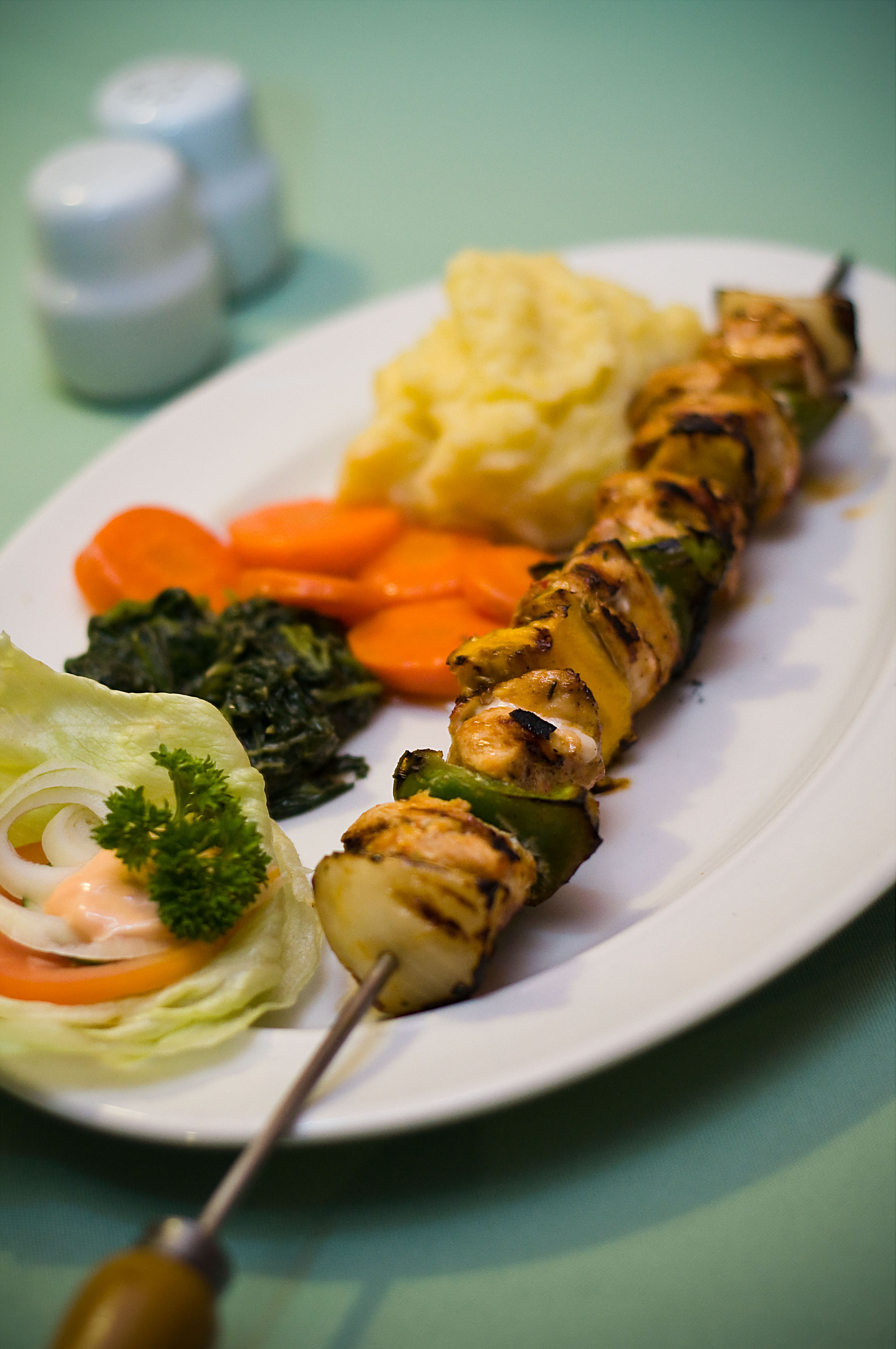
- Chicken sosatie
- Course: Main
- Place of origin: South Africa
- Serving temperature: Hot
- Main ingredients: Meat

Sosatie is a traditional South African dish of meat (usually lamb or mutton) cooked on skewers. The term derives from sate ("skewered meat") and saus ("spicy sauce"). It is of Cape Malay origin, used in Afrikaans—the primary language of the Cape Malays—and the word has gained greater circulation in South Africa. Marinated, cubed meat (usually lamb) is skewered and cooked by braaing (barbecuing) shish kebab-style. Sosatie recipes vary, but commonly the ingredients can include cubes of lamb, beef, chicken, dried apricots, red onions and mixed peppers.

== Preparation ==
To prepare, mutton or other meat chunks are marinated overnight in fried onions, chillies, garlic, curry leaves and tamarind juice, then threaded on skewers and either pan-fried or grilled. However, the most common way to cook the sosaties is outside, on a braai (or barbecue). The meat chunks are often interspersed with small onions, sliced peppers, dried apricots or prunes.

== See also ==
- List of African dishes
- List of lamb dishes

=== Similar dishes ===
- Anticuchos – Peru and other Andean states
- Arrosticini – Italy (Abruzzo)
- Brochette – France, Spain (Catalonia)
- Chuanr – China
- City chicken – United States
- Espetada – Portugal
- Frigărui – Romania
- Kabab torsh – Iran
- Kebakko – Finland
- Khorovats – Armenia
- Kkochi – Korea
- Pinchitos – Spain (Andalusia and Extremadura)
- Ražnjići – Balkans
- Shashlik – Caucasus and Central Asia
- Souvlaki – Greece
- Suya – Nigeria
- Yakitori – Japan
