= Tunde ke kabab =

Minced meat dish associated with Lucknow, India

Galouti Kabab
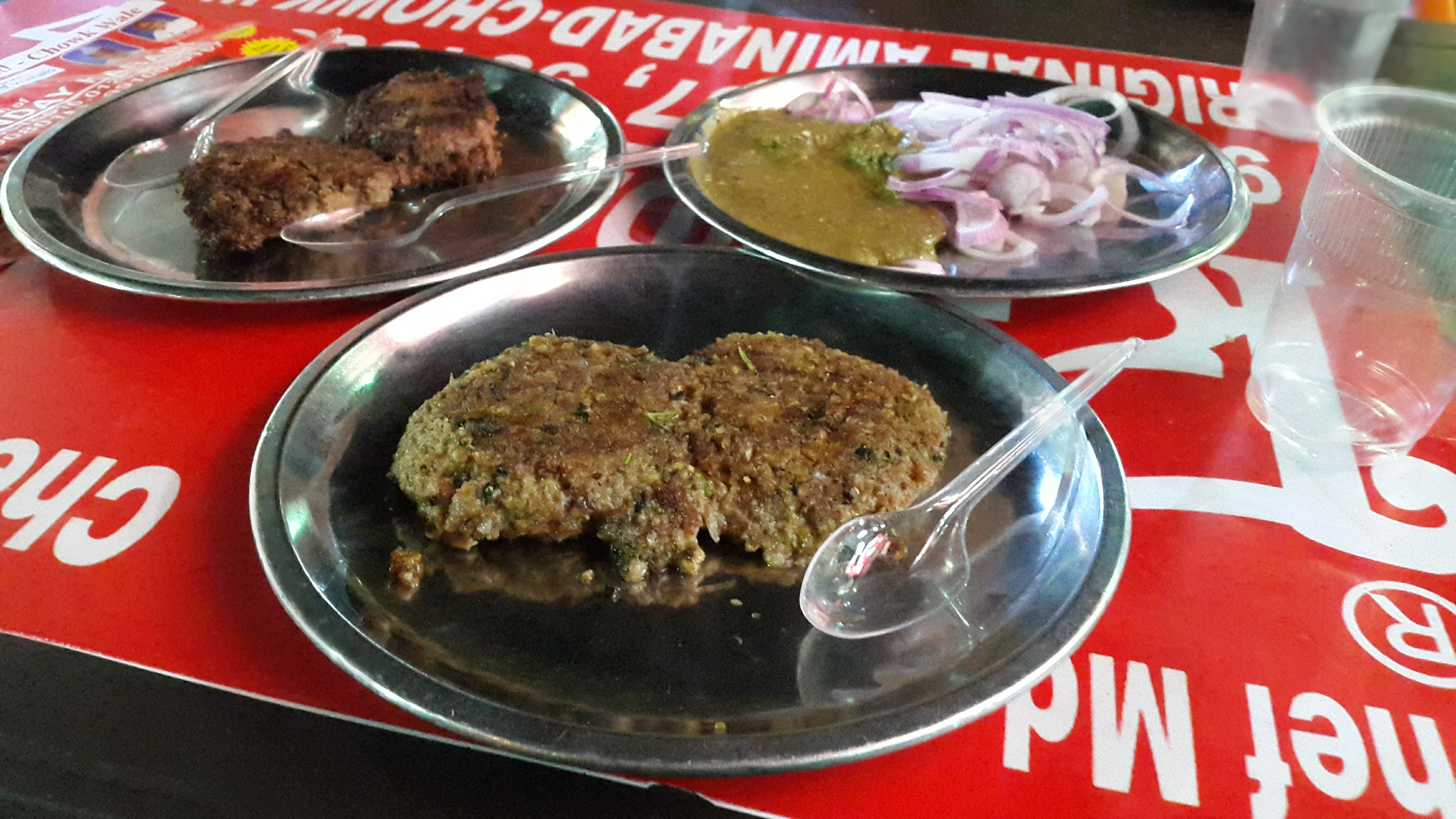
- Plate of Galouti Kebab in the centre
- Course: Main course
- Place of origin: Awadh, India
- Region or state: Lucknow, Uttar Pradesh, India
- Created by: Awadhi cuisine
- Invented: 17th century
- Serving temperature: Hot
- Main ingredients: Buffalo meat
- Variations: Many flavors
- Food energy (per serving): 500 Cl

Tunday ke kebab also known as Galouti kebab, is a dish made with minced meat strongly associated with the city of Lucknow, India. It is a part of Awadhi cuisine. It is said to incorporate 160 different spices. Ingredients include finely minced buffalo meat, plain yogurt, garam masala, grated ginger, crushed garlic, ground cardamom, powdered cloves, melted ghee, dried mint, small onions cut into rings, vinegar, saffron, rose water, sugar, and lime. Galouti Kebab was popularised by the Nawab of Awadh Wajid Ali Shah of Lucknow. Lucknow restaurant Tunday Kababi, started in 1905, is famous for serving buffalo meat galouti kebab.

In India, due to dietary and religious restrictions, galouti kebab is also made with minced mutton and minced chicken with a variety of assorted spices and ground millet for binding. It is generally fried in ghee, though any other edible oil may be used also.

== Origin ==
During the 17th century, in the Awadh state under the Mughals in Northern India, one of the members related to the Nawabs of Awadh held a competition for the khansamahs to prepare kebabs as soft as possible to chew. One of the khansamahs, Murad, who was also tunda (one-armed), prepared the dish using at least 100 Indian and exotic spices including some aphrodisiacs. The Nawab found the kebabs so delicious that he immediately declared Murad the winner. Eventually the kebabs became so popular in Awadh and other Mughal courts that they came to be known as tunday ke kebab, literally meaning 'one-armed man's kebabs'.

The dish, derived from the Hindi-Urdu word galawati (गलौटी / گلوٹی), meaning "thing that melts", referring to its softness.

== See also ==
- Kebab
