= Kebakko =

Finnish meat dish

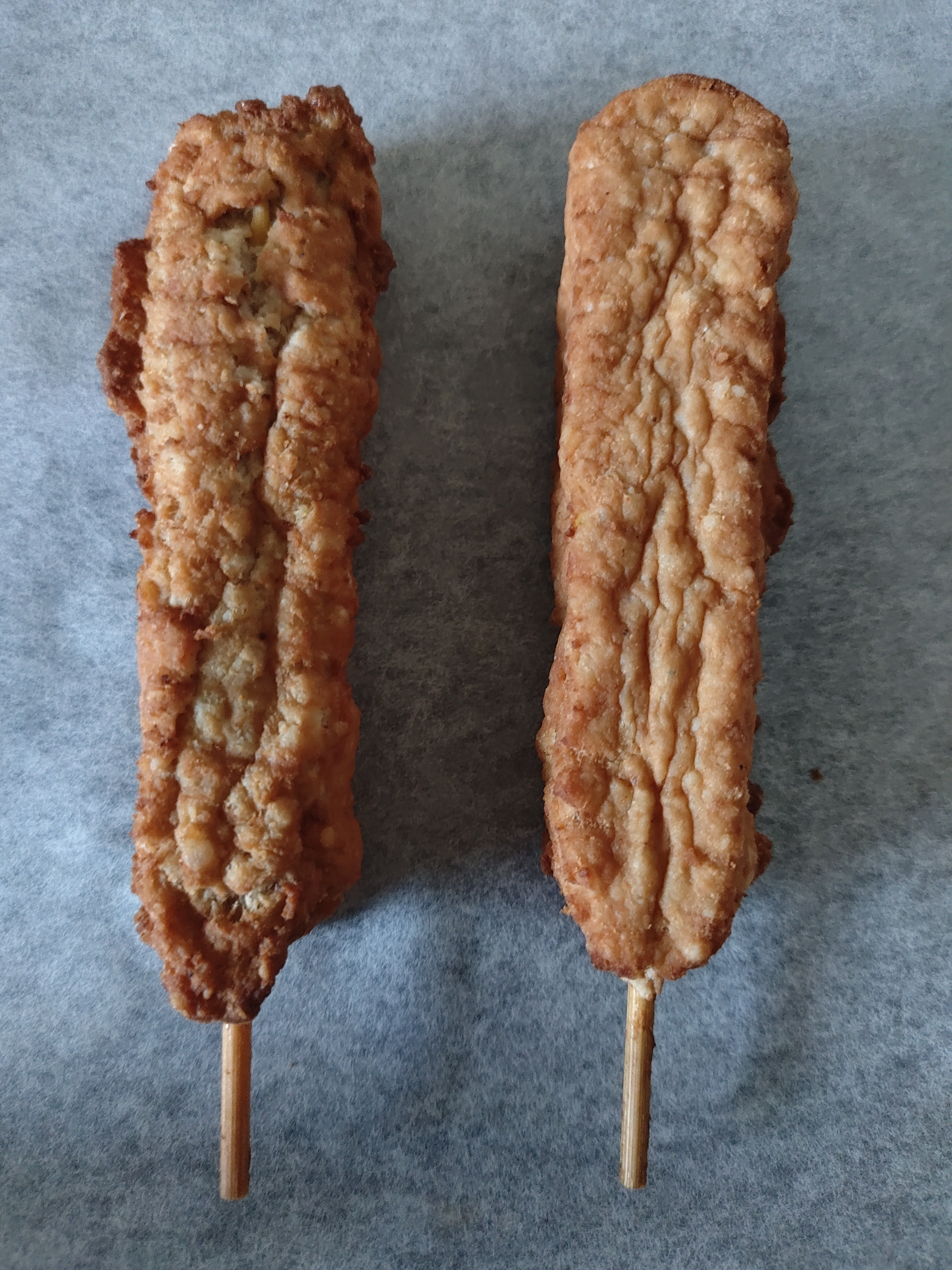

Kebakko is a type of ready-meal in Finland. Kebakkos are very similar to meatballs in Finland. It consists of meat, breadcrumbs, onions, eggs, and spices. The difference is mostly in shape; instead of a ball, kebakko is a piece of meat about 12 cm in length on a wooden stick, usually sold in packs of five to twelve. The name comes from kebab, and the Finnish word kepakko, meaning "small stick."

Kebakko represents fusion cuisine. It combines kebab with traditional Finnish meatloaf. The usual way to serve kebakkos is to heat them and serve them with various sauces for dipping; the stick enables the kebakkos to be dipped and eaten by hand.
