= Frigărui =

Romanian kebab

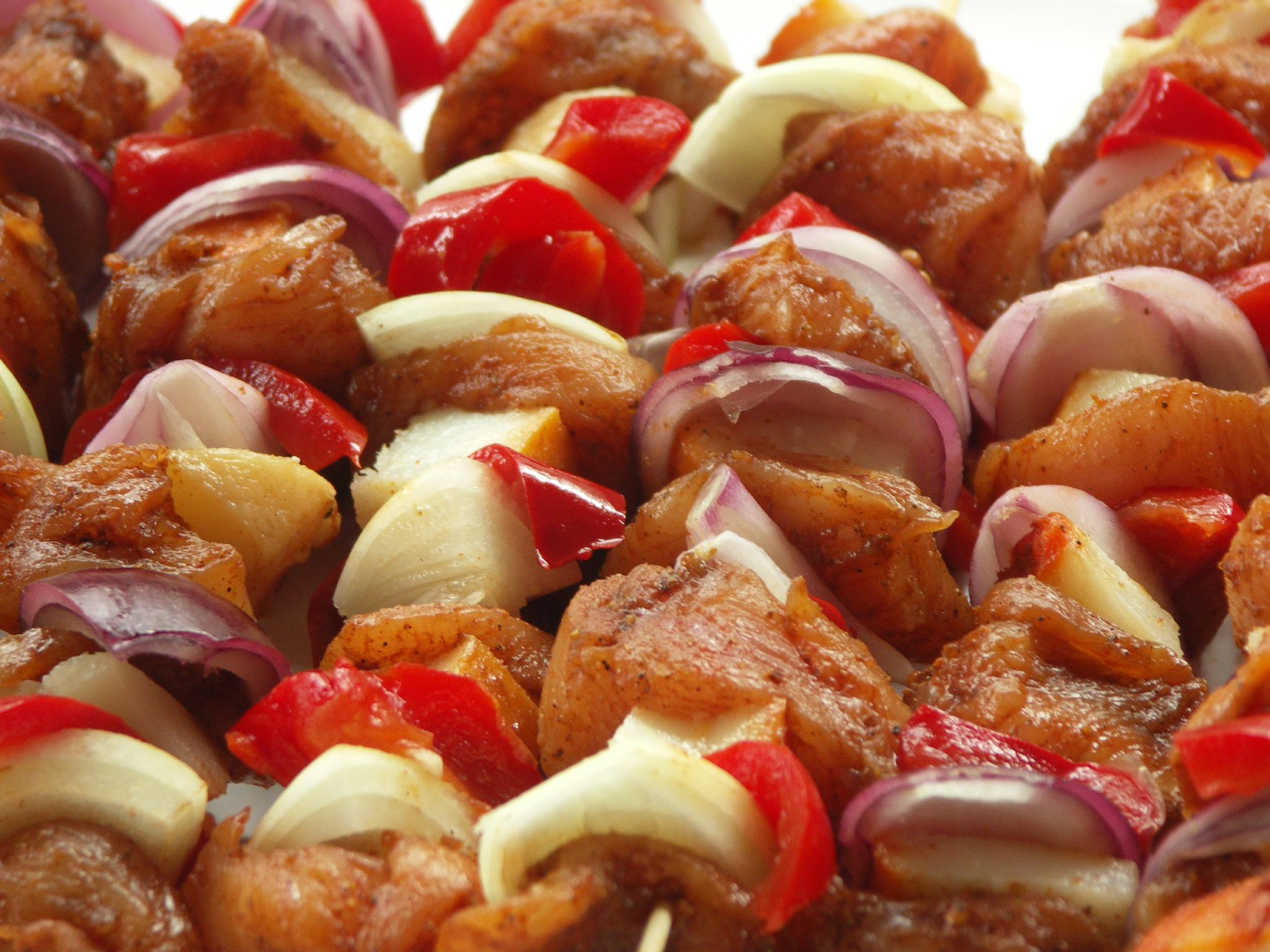
Frigărui, Romanian-style kebabs

Frigărui (Romanian pronunciation: [friɡəˈruj], singular: frigăruie) is a Romanian dish consisting of small pieces of meat (usually pork, beef, mutton, lamb or chicken) grilled on a skewer, similar to shashlik or shish kebab. Often, the pieces of meat alternate with bacon, sausages, or vegetables, such as onions, tomatoes, bell peppers and mushrooms. It is seasoned with spices such as pepper, garlic, savory, rosemary, marjoram and laurel.

The word frigăruie is a diminutive form of frigare "skewer", which is derived from a frige, meaning "to grill" or "to fry". This in turn comes from the Latin frῑgĕre "roast, fry" and as such is a cognate of the English "fry".

== See also ==
- Brochette
