= Buffalo meat =

Meat of the water buffalo

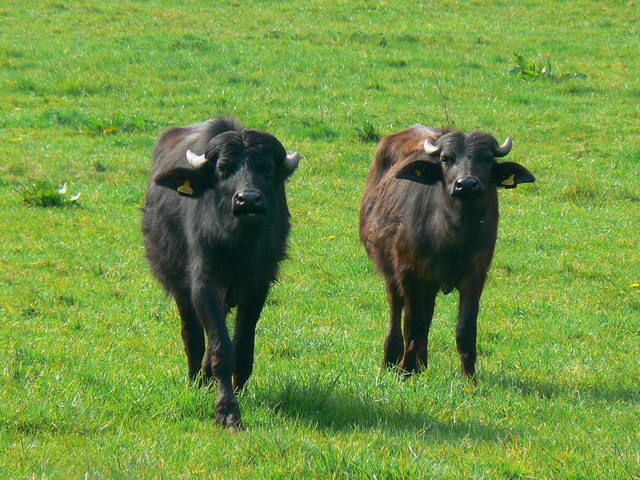
Water buffalo on a farm in Great Britain

Buffalo meat is the meat of the water buffalo, a large bovid, raised for its milk and meat in many countries. The water buffalo population is distributed worldwide, but ninety-seven percent of it is located in Asia. China, Pakistan, and India have most of the available stock.

Buffalo meat is known by various names in different countries. In some places it is known as red beef, buffalo beef, or buff in India and Nepal; in other countries, it is known as carabeef, a portmanteau of "carabao" and "beef", originally coined in Philippine English in the 1970s to distinguish the meat of water buffaloes. Meat taken from a buffalo younger than 20 months is known as padwa in India, pado in Nepal and bansgosh in Pakistan. Buffalo calves are often referred to as buffalo broilers and brought up exclusively on milk for the purpose of being slaughtered young for meat.

== Social significance ==
Due to the religious importance of cows and restrictions on beef in India and Nepal (and some places in eastern Bhutan), there is a need to differentiate buffalo meat from beef. In countries like India, for religious reasons, a considerable part of the population does not eat beef (meat of cattle). In a large number of the Indian states and in Nepal, slaughtering cattle is prohibited.

== Differences from beef ==
Water buffalo are a type of bovid, but their meat is different from beef in many respects. Buffalo meat has a lower fat content, and its fat is milky white, compared to the yellow-white fat of beef. Buffalo meat is darker in color, and buffaloes, because of their larger size, have harder bones than cows. Buffalo meat has a lower muscle pH of 5.6±0.4 whereas beef muscle has a pH of 6.4±0.7. It also has a significantly smaller amount of collagen in its muscles, but the species does not differ significantly in the degree of intramuscular collagen cross-linking.

== Production ==
Buffalo have exceptional muscular development and thus they are considerably heavy, with some weighing more than a tonne. The main agricultural use of buffalo is to obtain milk. India has the largest number of buffalo and is the largest producer of its milk, producing nearly 57 million tonnes of it annually. This accounts for 67% of global production. Slaughtering buffalo for meat is a secondary agricultural priority. Buffalo meat from young buffalo has a much better quality as they have a higher proportion of muscle and a lower proportion of fat as compared to other cattle meat. The highest quality buffalo meat is known as "padwa" in India, taken from a buffalo younger than 24 months. India accounts for about 43% of the world buffalo meat production, with Uttar Pradesh producing the most, followed by Andhra Pradesh and Maharashtra. In the 21st century, buffalo meat production in India has been growing and has increased from 4.1 million tonnes CWE (carcass weight equivalent) in 2014 to 4.3 million tonnes CWE in 2015. In India, during the calendar year 2014–2015, consumption estimates had been forecasted to rise from 3.1% and 3.5% to 2.1 and 2.175 million tonnes CWE respectively, according to the US Department of Agriculture.

Production of buffalo meat

Production of buffalo meat per animal

== Quality parameters of buffalo meat ==
For centuries buffalo have been used as draught animals as they have good muscular development. Buffalo are generally fed on coarse feeds; they convert them into the protein-rich lean meat. Buffalo can be suitably grown in countries having poor feed resources. Thus, buffalo are generally raised using straw crop residues and they are very cheap to feed. Some can work until the age of 30.

When buffalo are reared up to 24 months and fed with milk, their meat is of high quality. Buffalo meat is lean and rich in protein and less fatty than beef. This has created a high demand for buffalo meat among health-conscious consumers (Desmond, 1990). Buffalo may also be more resistant to disease than cattle. The nutrient requirements of buffalo steer constitute 1.8 kg TDN, 6.6 MCal ME, 0.24 kg DCP, 11 g P and 14 g Ca. On ad libitum and high concentrate (75:25) based rations the growth rate is 610 g/day (with feed efficiency of 7:1). The protein content of buffalo meat is higher than chicken, and due to this buffalo meat is also called "poor people’s protein".

Table- Comparing Physical Composition of Buffalo meat and Buffalo meat broiler (‘Padwa’)
Particulars	Buffalo meat	Buffalo meat broiler
Water (%)	74–78	76.89
Protein (%)	20.2–24.2	22.46
Fat (%)	0.9–1.8	0.35
Ash (%)	1.0	0.3
Cholesterol (mg %)	61	—N/a
Energy per 100 g (kJ / kcal)	550 (131)	480 (114)

== Indian export ==
India is one of the world's biggest exporters of buffalo meat. According to US Department of Agriculture, India leads over the next highest exporter Brazil. In 2015, India exported more than 2.4 million tonnes of buffalo meat and its allied products. Brazil exported 2 million tonnes and Australia 1.5 million tonnes. These two countries constitute 58.7% of all buffalo meat exports. India has 23.5% of global buffalo meat exports. In fiscal year 2014, the export share of India was 20%.

According to data obtained from Centre for Monitoring Indian Economy (CMIE), most of India's export is to Asian countries, which import more than 80% while African countries import around 15%. Within Asia, Vietnam imports 45% of the buffalo meat exported from India.

Buffalo meat exports from India have been growing at an average of approximately 14% yearly since 2011 and fetched more than $4.8 billion in 2014. Last year was the first time India has earned more from the export of buff than it did from Basmati rice exports.

Several databases, such as Agricultural Outlook and United Nations Food, show there is increasing trend of meat consumption in India. However, the data also show that the consumption of buffalo meat has been falling over the years. It has come down by (-) 44.5% in 2014 from 2000. This fall in consumption has been taking place because of an increase in the price of buffalo meat and health consciousness. Consumption of chicken went up by 31% in that period, showing that white meat is taking precedence over red meat.

== Consumption ==
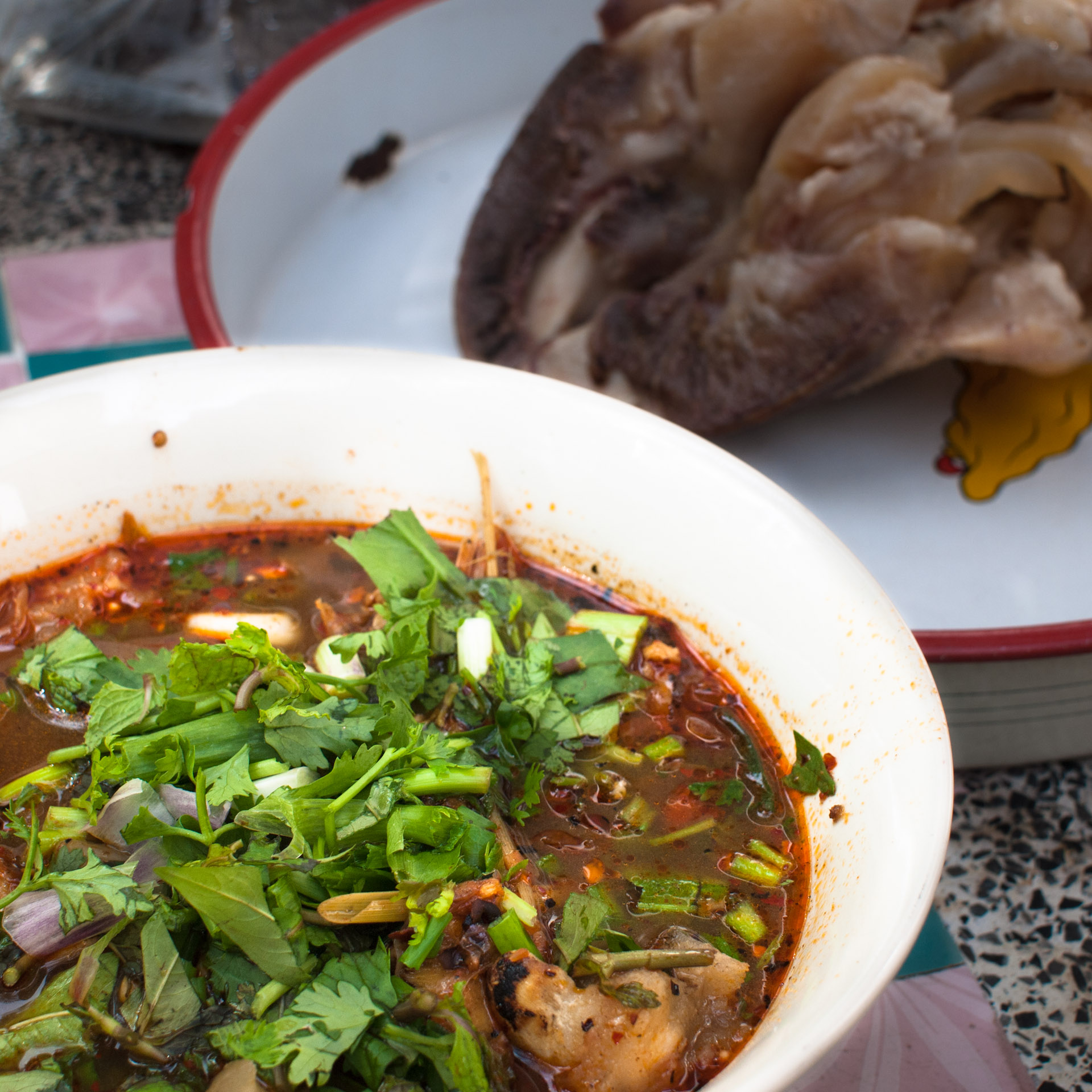
The Thai dish Yam tin khwai is a spicy and sour Northern Thai soup made with the hoof of a water buffalo

In areas of the south Italian region of Campania which rear water buffalo for mozzarella production, buffalo meat is served and made into cured sausages. Despite this, the idea of eating water buffalo is perceived as offputting and the meat viewed as tasting "too strong", and by the late 1990s it was not sold in supermarkets. Food writer Arthur Schwartz identifies this as a feature of older animals, contrasting their flavour with that of young water buffalo, which he says "tastes much like beef, only deeper flavoured. You might even say sweeter, as people say horsemeat is sweeter."

== See also ==
- Beefalo
- Buffalo burger
- Sukuti
- Żubroń
