= Halal Inn =

Former British temperance bar

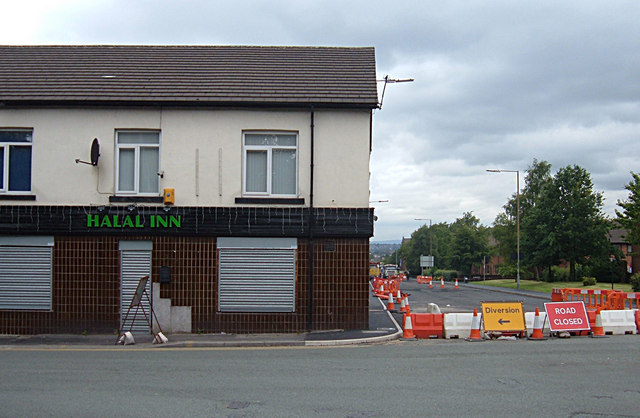
- The bar in 2008

- Location within Greater Manchester
- Former names: Westwood Inn

General information
- Location: Featherstall Road, Oldham, Greater Manchester, England
- Coordinates: 53.5427°N 2.1291°W
- Opening: 2007
- Closed: c. 2011

The Halal Inn was an alcohol free inn and temperance bar on Featherstall Road in Oldham, Greater Manchester, England. It was designed for Muslims and opened in December 2007. The owners bought and converted the former Westwood Inn. The bar served soft drinks, fruit juice, non-alcoholic spritzers, tea, and coffee, but no alcohol.

The inn was also home to a restaurant that served traditional Asian and Middle Eastern food such as poppadoms, chicken pakora, seekh kebabs and the lamb dish saag gosht. There was also a steam room and a prayer room. The inn ran a snooker league, a Carrom league, and a monthly Islamic quiz night. Although the customers were predominantly male and Muslim, people of all backgrounds could frequent the inn. In 2011 anecdotal reports stated the Halal Inn had closed down.
