= Kulfa gosht =

Muslim dish

- Course: Main
- Place of origin: India
- Region or state: Telangana State
- Main ingredients: Purslane plants (kulfa), lamb
- Variations: kulfa daal

Kulfa gosht is a popular dish among Hyderabadi Muslims, originating in Hyderabad, India. Kulfa is an Urdu word for purslane, a succulent green leafy vegetable; gosht is a South Asian term for "meat". The combination of purslane with lamb is a unique fusion by Hyderabadi Muslims.
