= Şevketibostan yemeği =

Turkish lamb dish

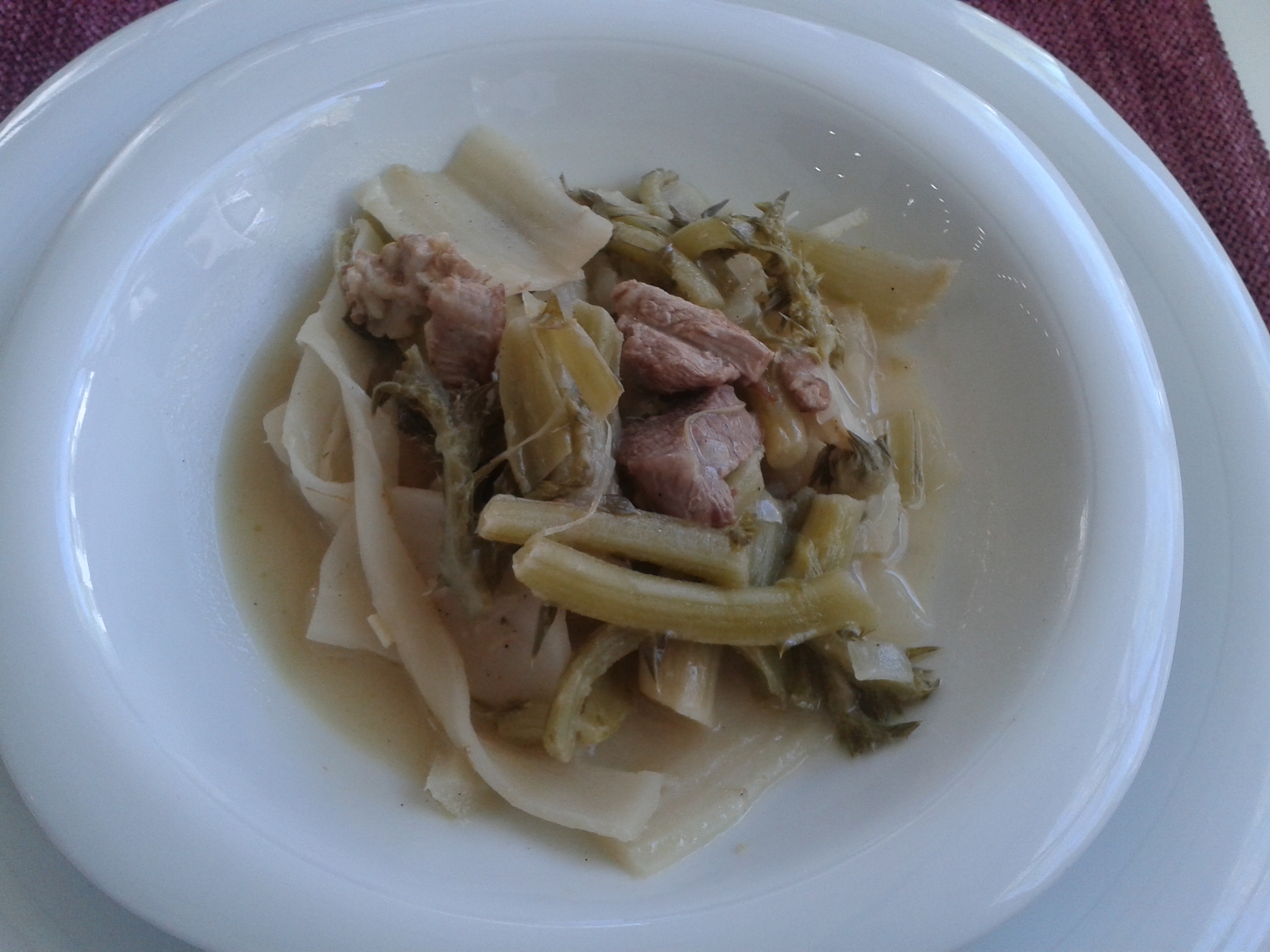
- Region or state: Turkey
- Serving temperature: Hot

Şevketibostan yemeği (Turkish: Şevketibostan yemeği) is a dish cooked and consumed in Aegean region of Turkiye. Ingredients include Şevketibostan (Cnicus benedictus), lamb chunks, onion, lemon juice, flour, butter, and salt.

== See also ==
- Colocasia with lamb
- Corn poppy with lamb
