= Aloo gosht =

Curry dish made with meat and potatoes

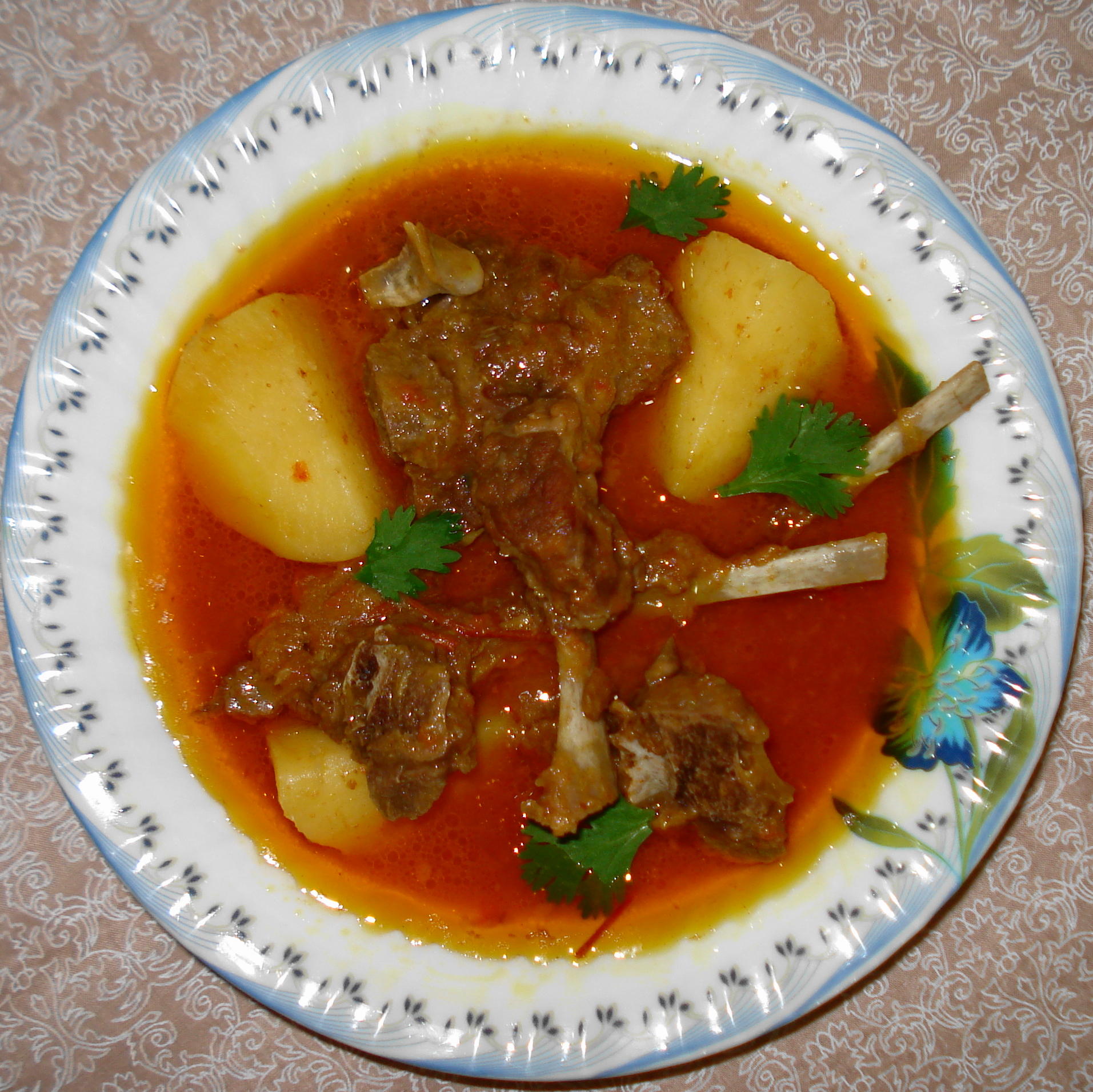
- A plate of Aloo gosht
- Type: Curry
- Course: Main course
- Region or state: South Asia
- Associated cuisine: Pakistani, Indian
- Main ingredients: Meat and potato

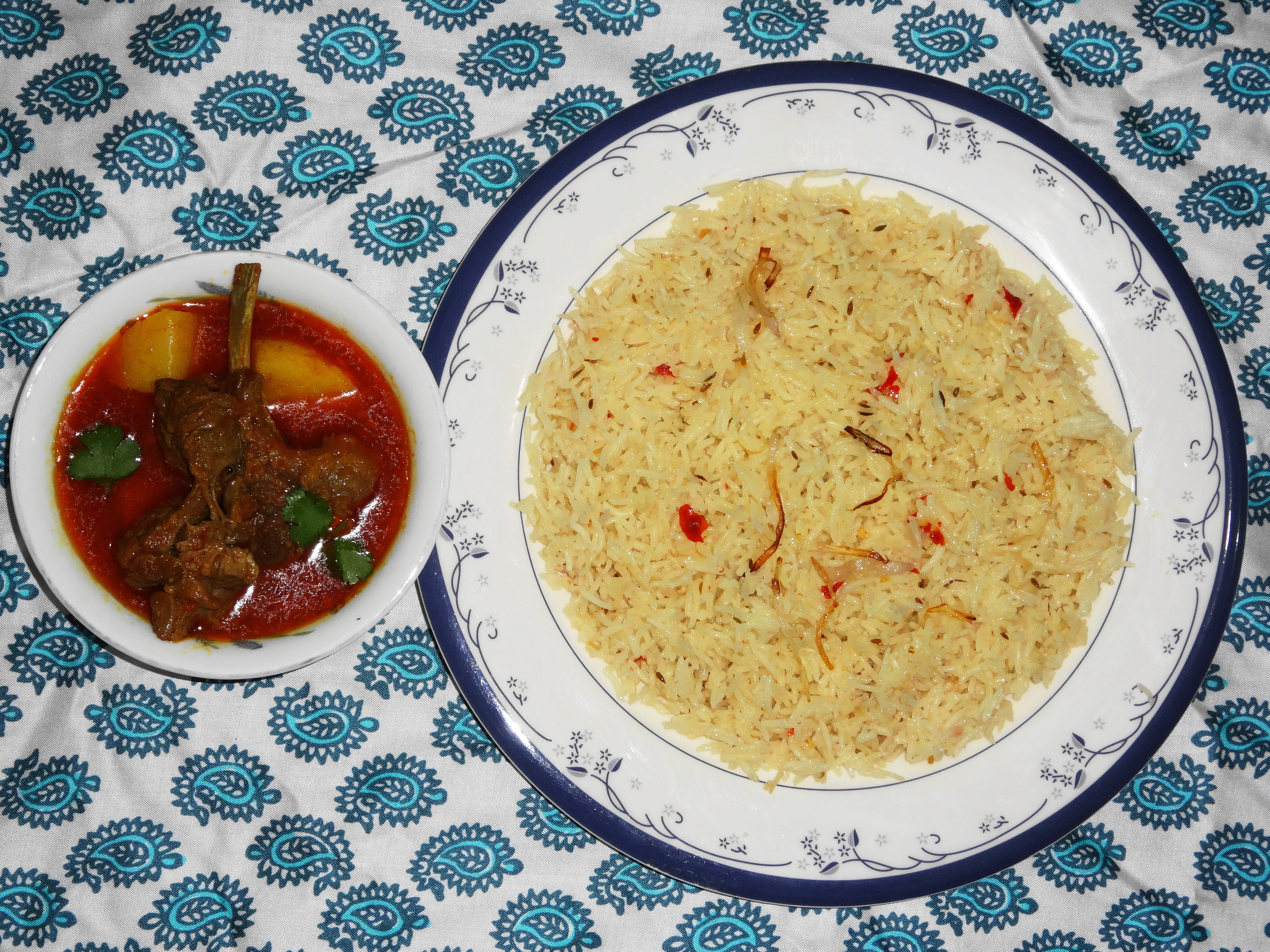
Saloonay chawal (brown rice) served with Aloo gosht

Aloo gosht is a meat curry, a popular dish in North Indian, Pakistani, and Bangladeshi cuisine. It consists of potatoes (aloo) cooked with meat (gosht), usually lamb or mutton or beef, in a stew-like shorba gravy. It may be considered a curry, stew, or shorba depending on the way the dish is prepared, the types of spices used and what country or particular region it was made in. The dish can be served and eaten with plain rice or with bread such as roti, paratha or naan.

It is a favorite and common dish in India and Pakistan, Indian and Bangladeshi meals; and is commonly consumed as a comfort food in the Indian subcontinent.

== Preparation ==
There are various methods of cooking aloo gosht. Generally, the preparation method involves simmering lamb or beef pieces and potatoes over medium heat, with spices.

Lamb or beef meat is cut into chunks and placed into a stew pot over heat. Chicken may be used as an alternative to lamb or beef. Tomatoes, along with cinnamon, bay leaves, ginger, garlic, red chili powder, cumin seeds, fried onions, black cardamom, garam masala and cooking oil are added and stirred. Potatoes and salt are mixed in. Water is added, in a proportion that is enough to cover the meat, and brought to a boil. The aloo gosht is covered and left to simmer until the meat becomes tender. Once ready, it may be garnished with chopped coriander leaves and served hot.

== See also ==
- Aloo gobi
- List of lamb dishes
- List of meat and potato dishes
- Pakistani meat dishes
