= List of lamb dishes =

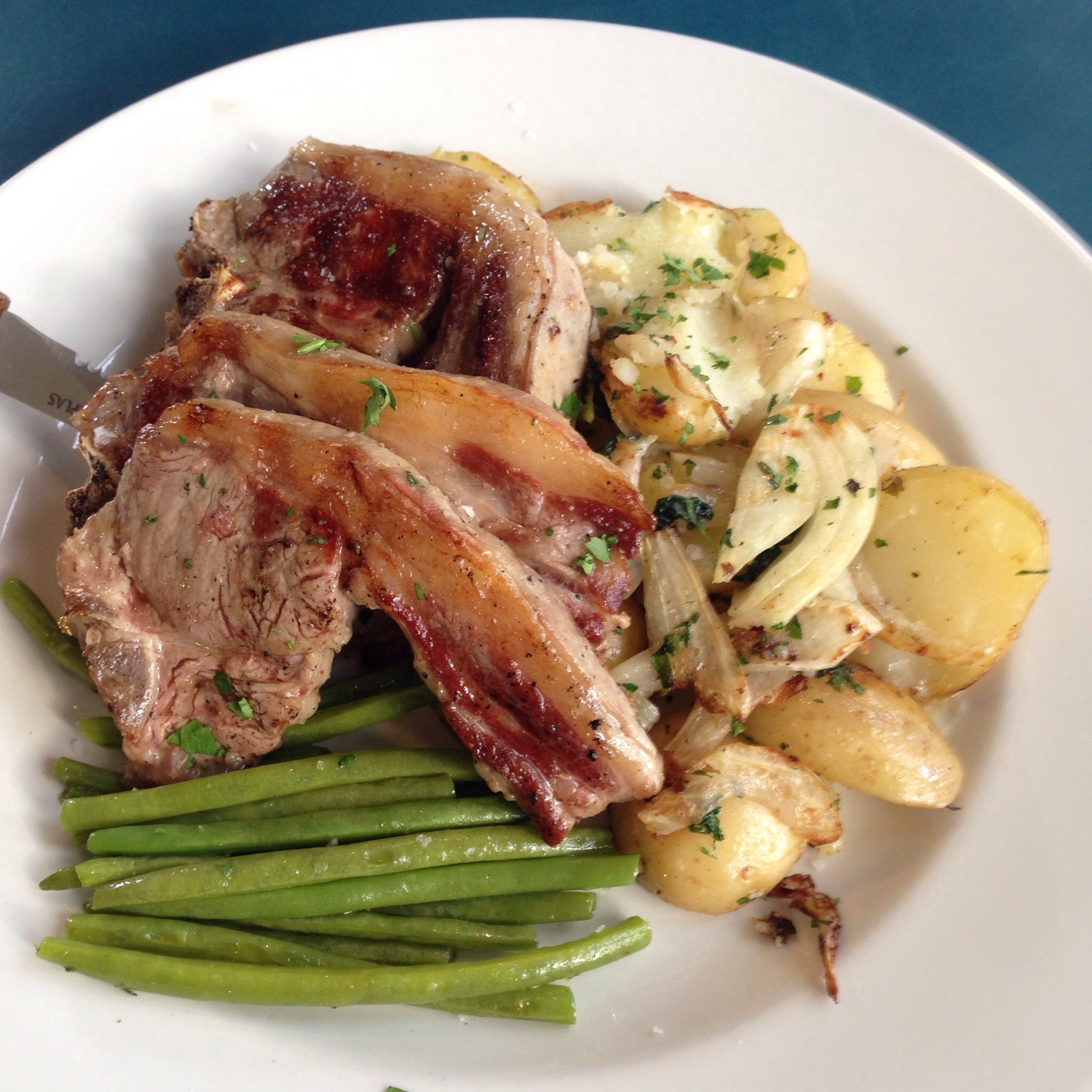
Lamb chops with new potatoes and green beans

This is a list of the popular lamb and mutton dishes and foods worldwide. Lamb and mutton are terms for the meat of domestic sheep (species Ovis aries) at different ages. A sheep in its first year is called a lamb, and its meat is also called lamb. The meat of a juvenile sheep older than one year is hogget; outside North America this is also a term for the living animal. The meat of an adult sheep is mutton, a term only used for the meat, not the living animal.

Meat from sheep features prominently in several cuisines of the Mediterranean. Lamb and mutton are very popular in Central Asia and in Pakistan and India, where other red meats may be eschewed for religious or economic reasons. It is also very popular in Australia. Barbecued mutton is also a specialty in some areas of the United States (chiefly Owensboro, Kentucky) and Canada.

== Lamb dishes ==
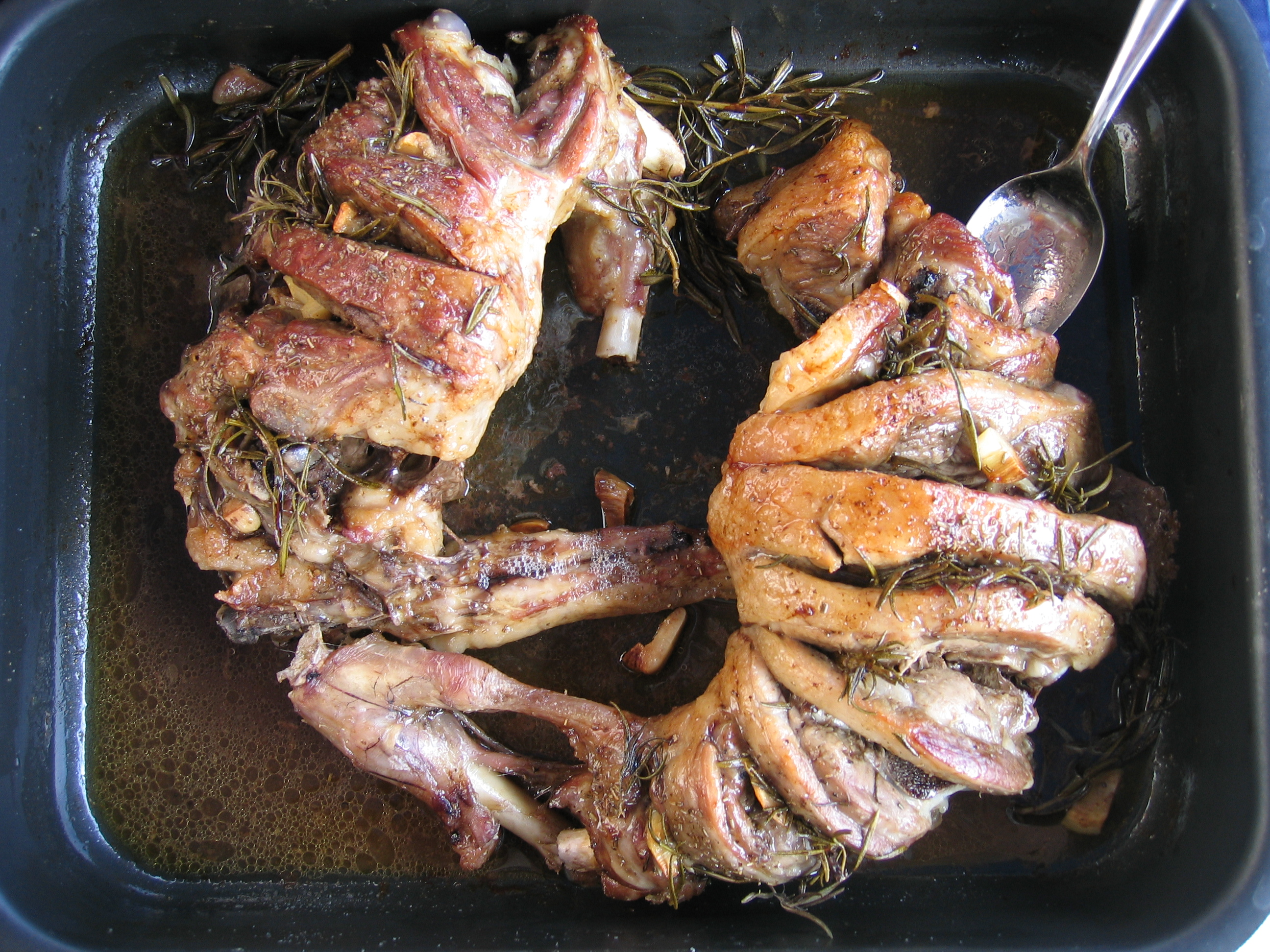
Abbacchio, a lamb preparation from the Italian Easter tradition

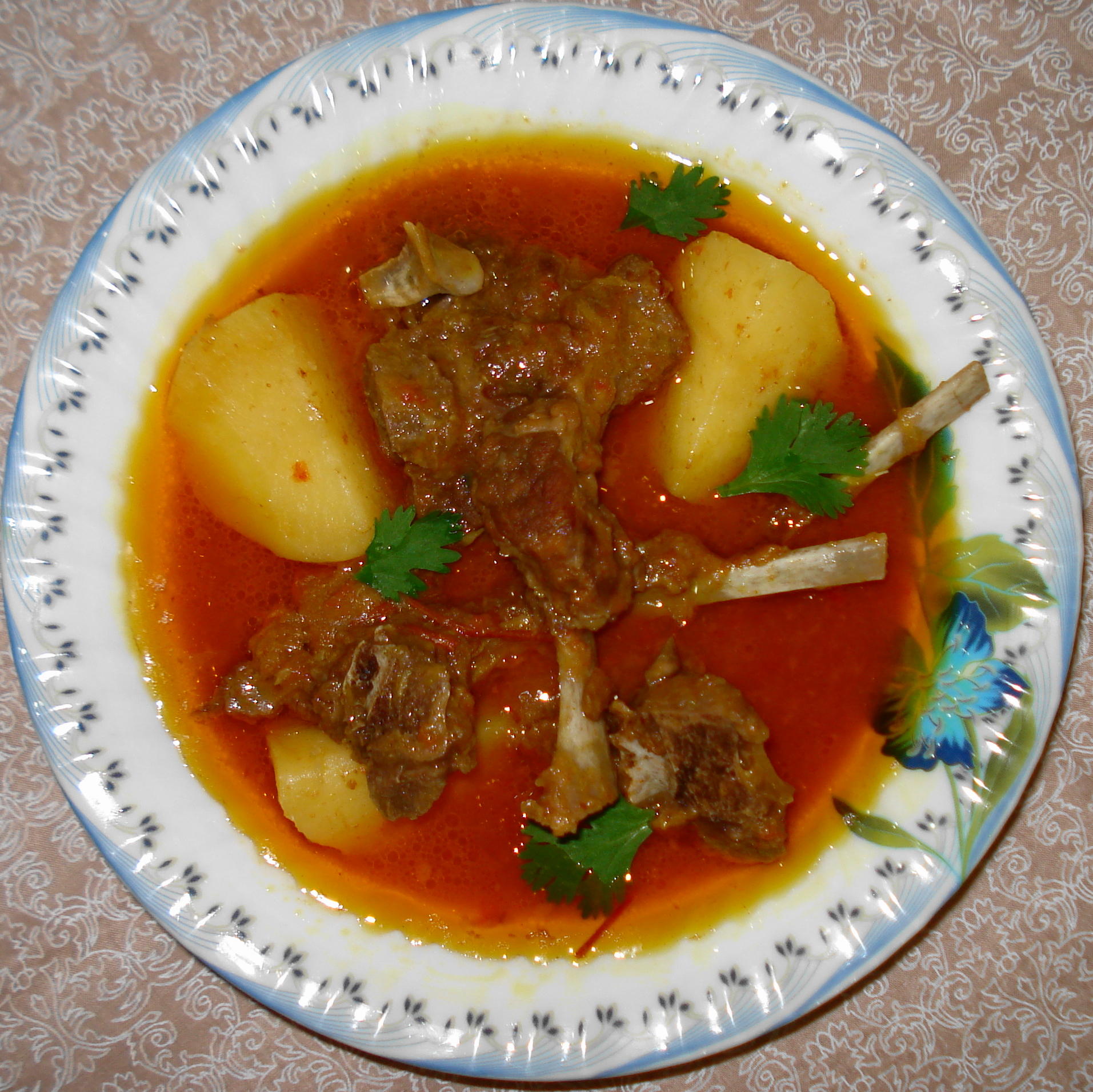
Aloo gosht is a meat curry in North Indian cuisine. It consists of potatoes ("aloo") cooked with meat ("gosht"), usually lamb or mutton, in a stew-like shorba gravy.

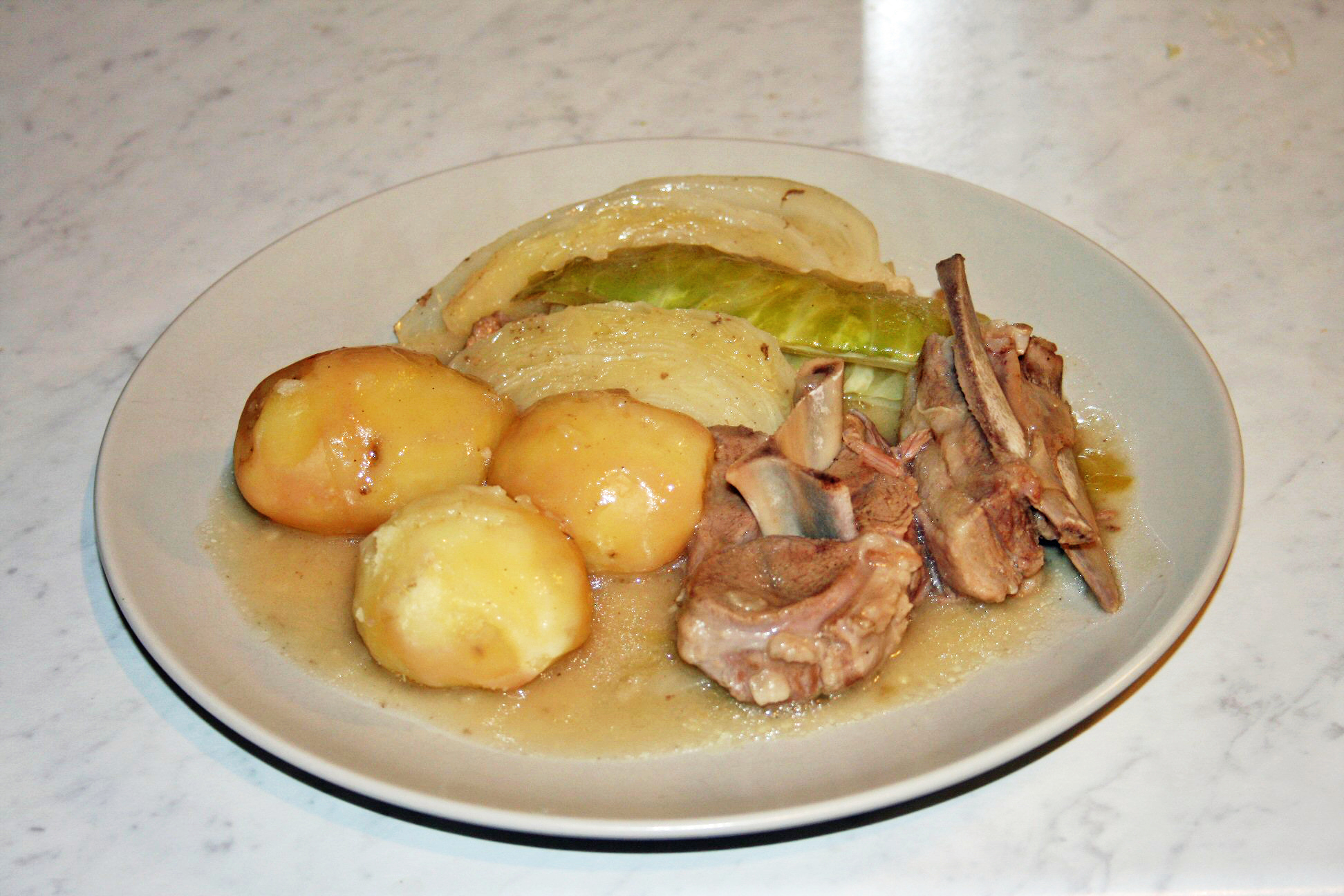
Fårikål is a traditional Norwegian dish consisting of mutton with bone, cabbage, whole black pepper and often a little wheat flour. It is traditionally served with potatoes boiled in their jackets.

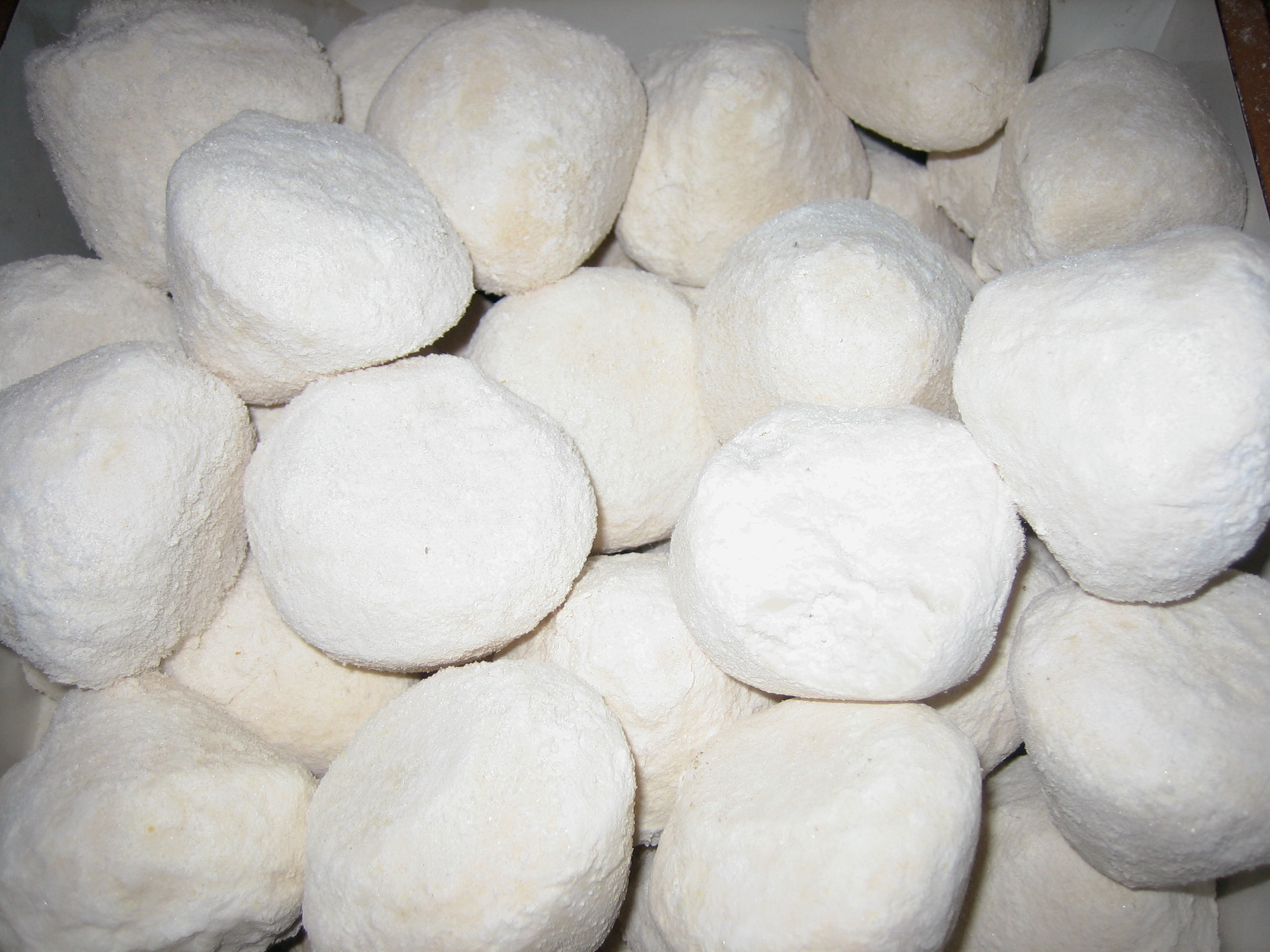
Jameed consists of hard dry laban (yogurt) made from sheep's milk or goat's milk.

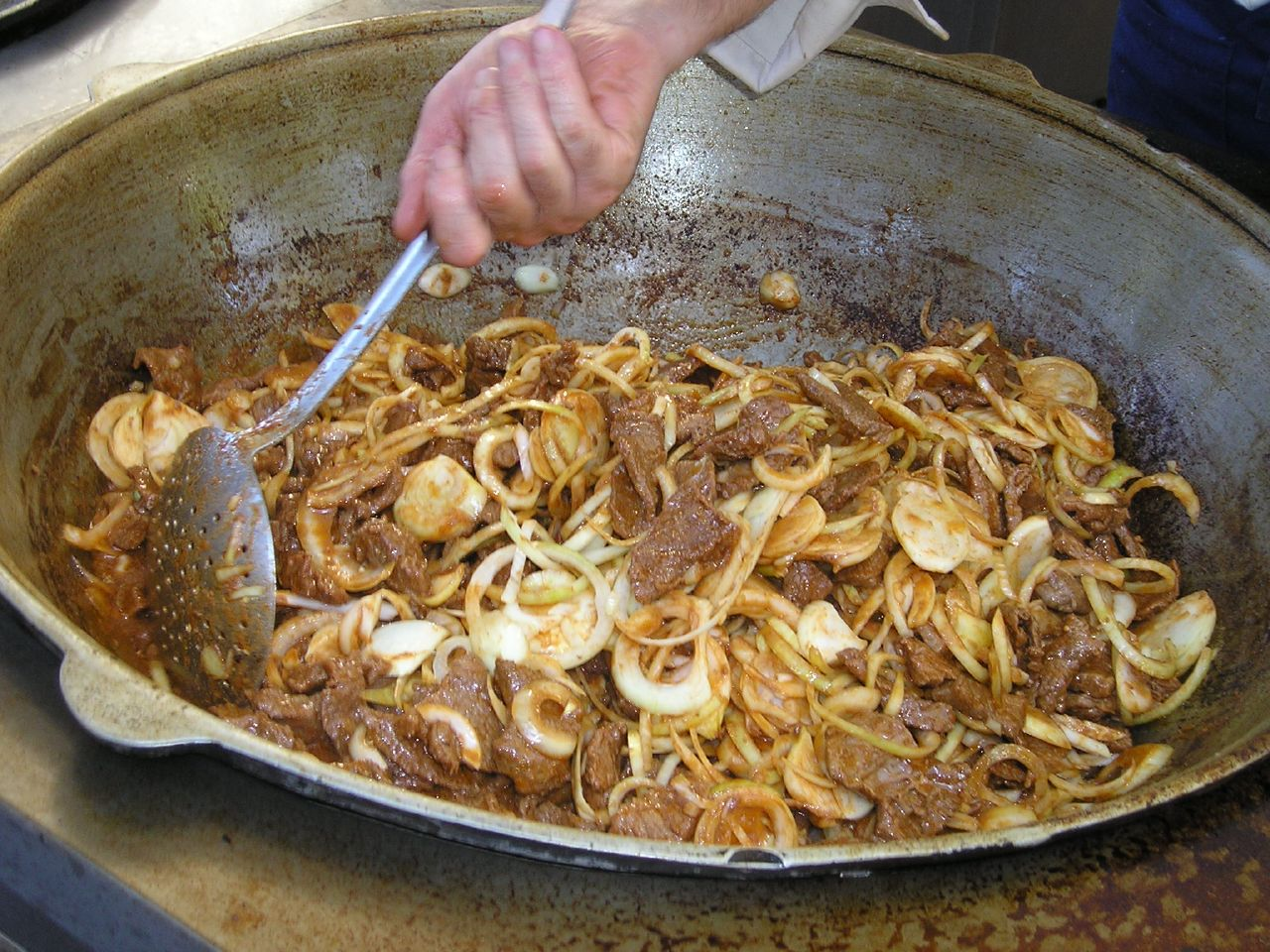
Kuurdak is a traditional meat dish in Central Asia. It is usually made from mutton

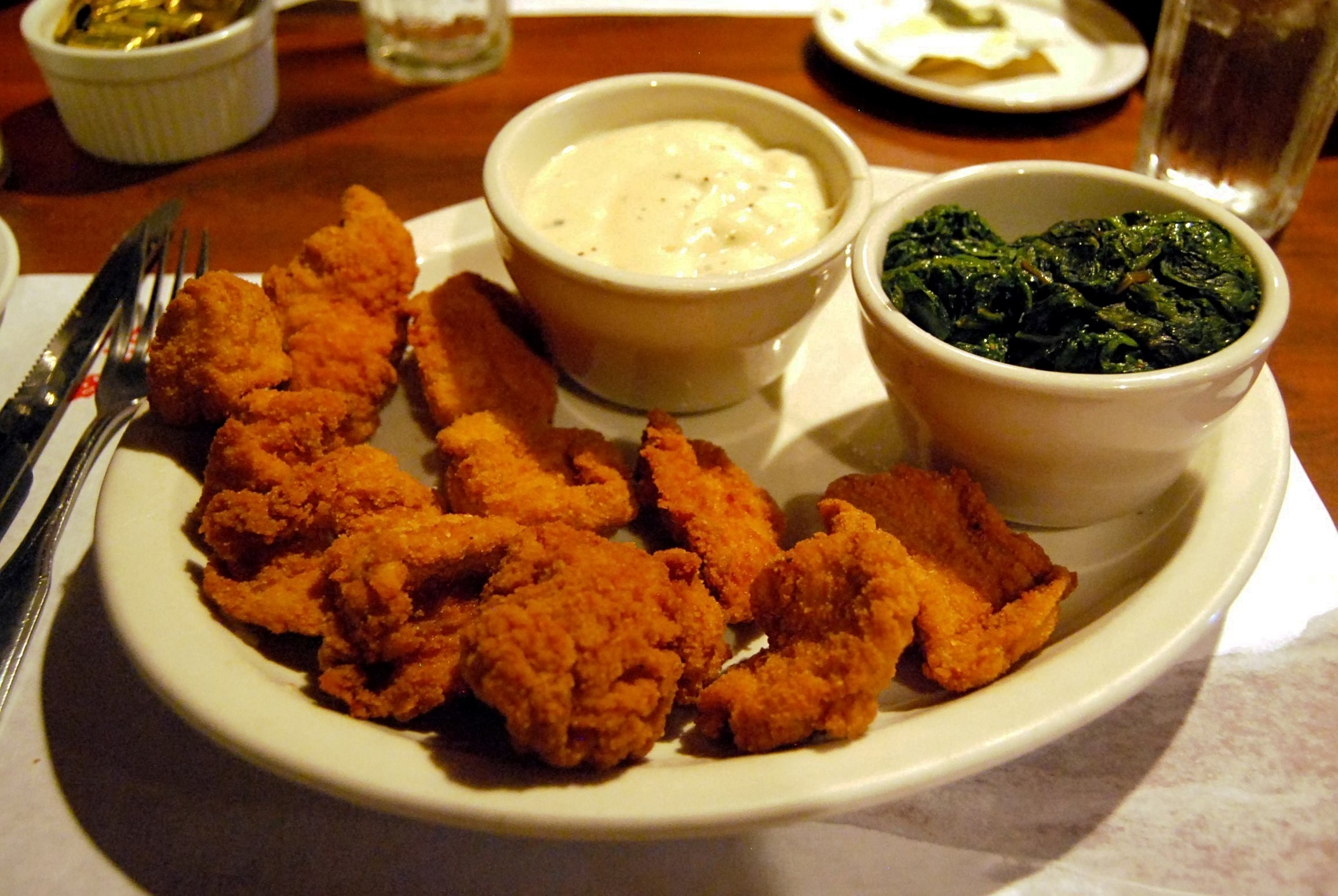
Lamb fries are lamb testicles used as food, and are served in a variety of cuisines.

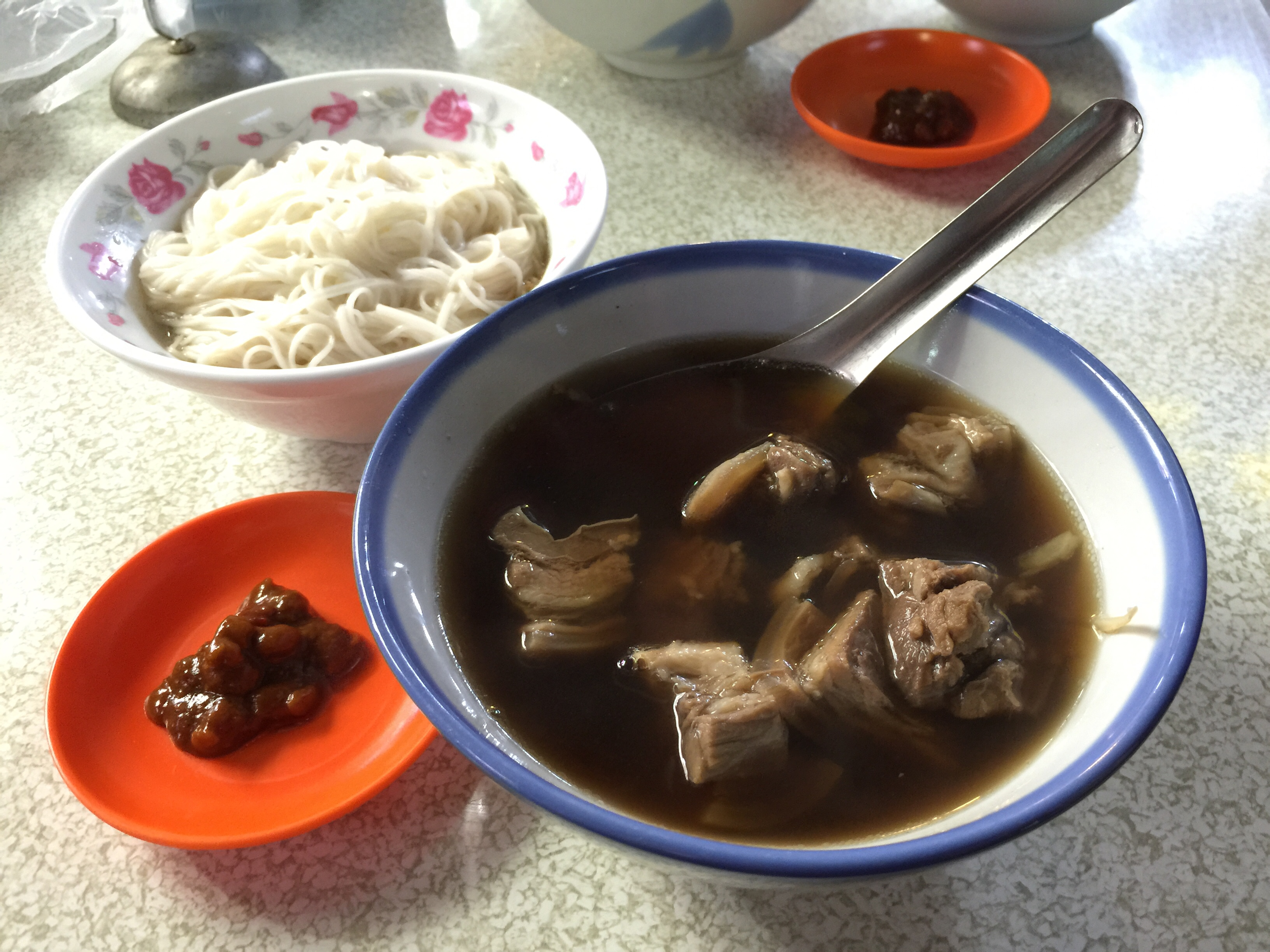
Mutton hot pot are traditional Taiwanese hot pots often eaten during cooler seasons.

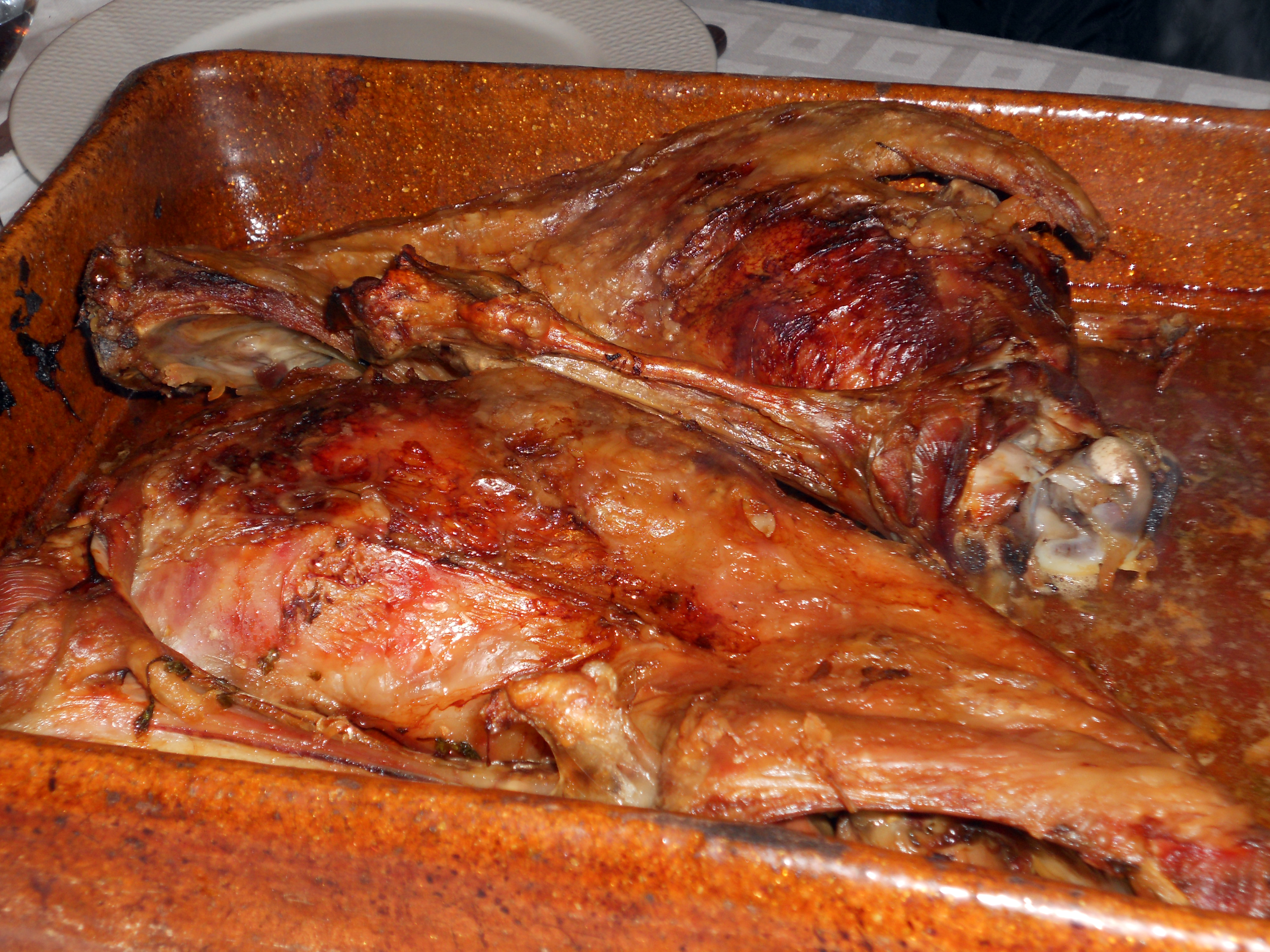
Lechazo is a Spanish dish made from "cordero lechal", the meat from unweaned lamb.

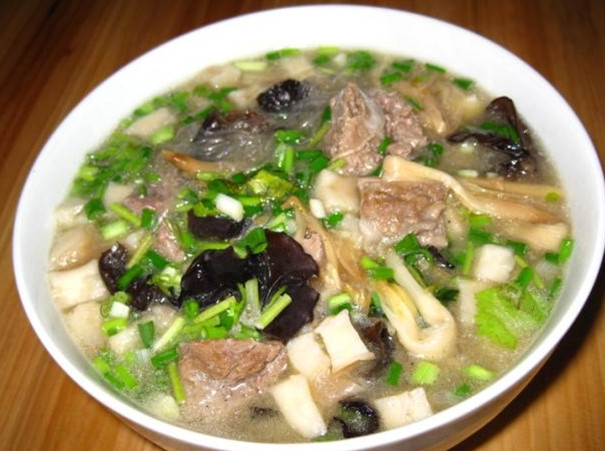
Lamb paomo

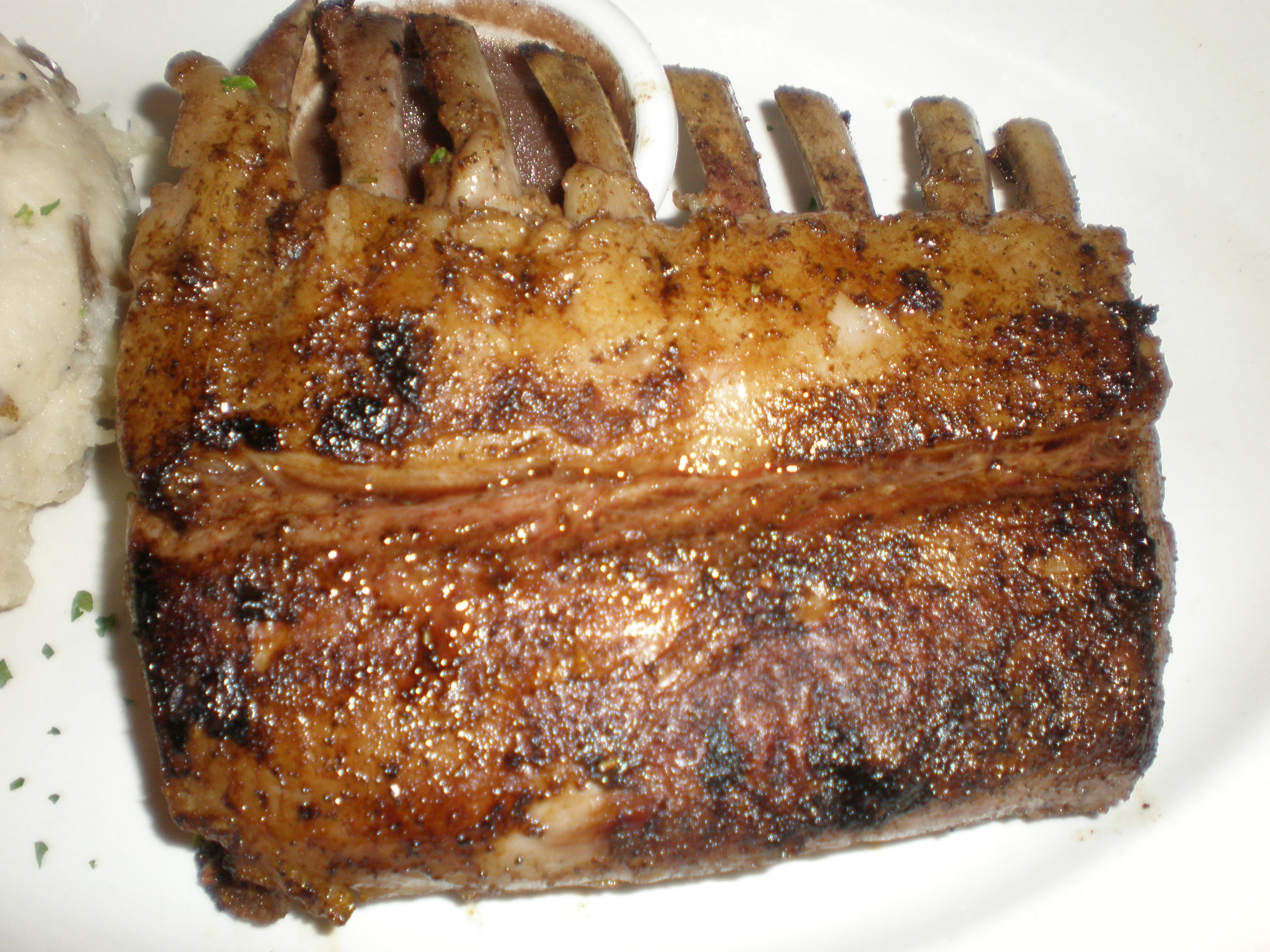
Roast rack of lamb

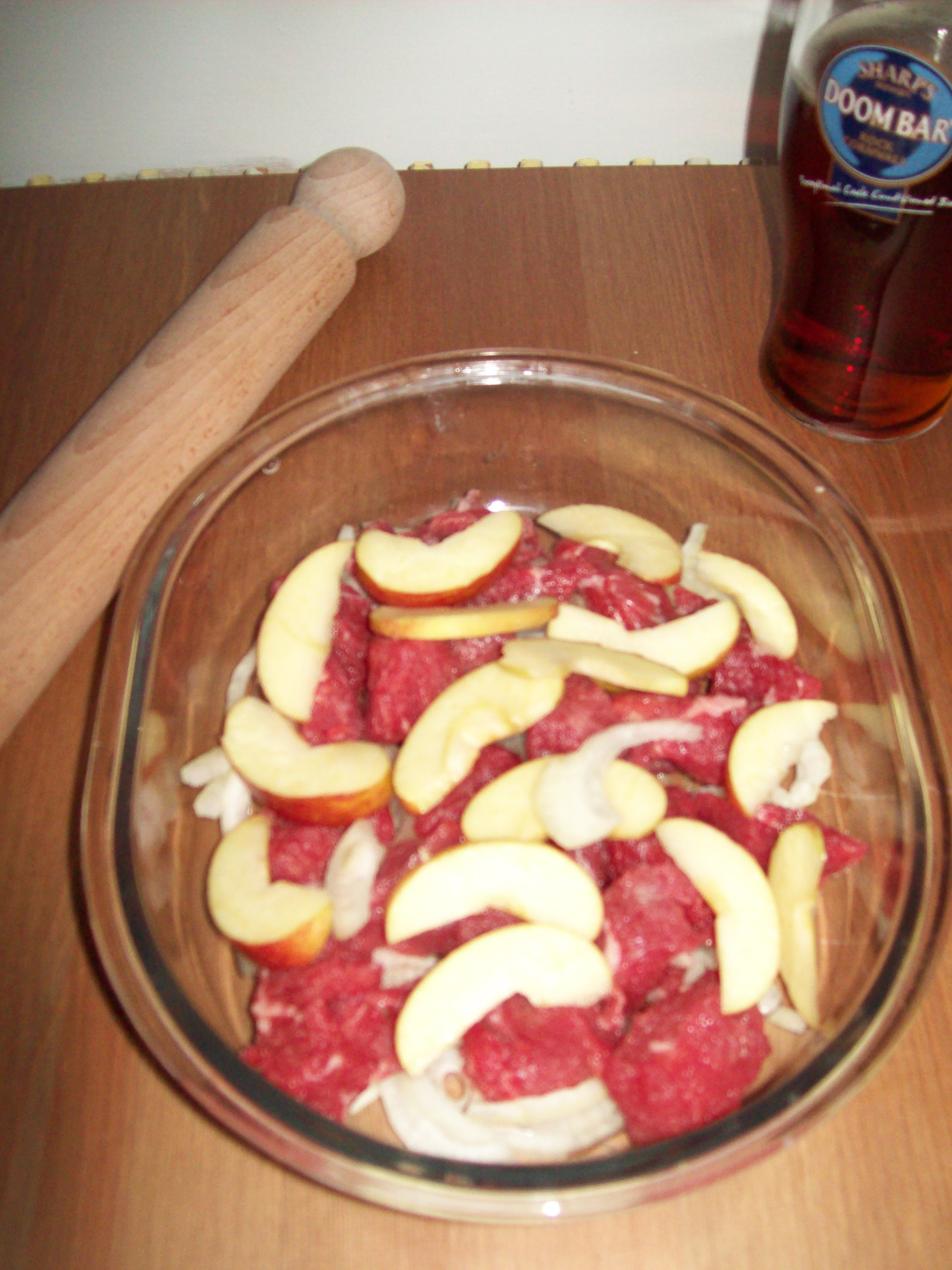
Squab pie ingredients, prior to the addition of pie pastry

- Abbacchio – Italy
- Abgoosht – Iran
- Alinazik kebab – Turkey
- Aloo gosht – Northern Indian Subcontinent
- Arrosticini – Abruzzo, Central Italy
- Bakhsh – From the cuisine of the Bukharan Jews from Tajikistan and Uzbekistan as well as Afghan Jewry
- Beşbarmaq – Common among Turkic peoples in Central Asia
- Beyti kebab – Turkey
- Biryani – Indian Subcontinent
- Blessed thistle with lamb – Aegean Sea region; popular in both Greece and Turkey.
- Cağ kebabı – Turkey
- Cawl – Wales
- Ćevapi – Common throughout the Balkans
- Chakapuli – Georgia
- Chanakhi – Georgia
- Chegdermeh – Turkmenistan
- Colocasia with lamb – Cyprus
- Colonial goose – New Zealand
- Corn poppy with lamb – Aegean Sea region; popular in both Greece and Turkey.
- Curry – Indian Subcontinent
- Dalcha – Hyderabad, Southern India
- Devilled kidneys – England
- Dhansak – Indian Subcontinent; originated by the Parsi community.
- Doner kebab – Turkey
- Drob – Romania
- Ema-datshi – Bhutan
- Fahsa – Yemen, also popular in Turkey.
- Fårikål – Norway
- Fenalår – Norway
- Fennel with lamb – Aegean Sea region; popular in both Greece and Turkey.
- Gheimeh – Iran
- Grjúpán – Iceland
- Haneeth – Yemen
- Haggis – Scotland
- Hangikjöt – Iceland
- Instant-boiled mutton – China
- Irani mutton – Iran
- Jalamah – Saudi Arabia
- Jameed – Jordan
- Jingisukan – Hokkaido, Japan. Unique in that it is inspired and named for what Japanese people traditionally suspected Mongolian food to be like.
- Kabsa – Yemen
- Kasha Mangsho – Indian subcontinent
- Kabuli Palaw – Afghanistan
- Kairi ka do pyaza – Hyderabad, southern India
- Kamounia – North Africa
- Kaobaozi - Xinjiang, China
- Kebab – Various; found throughout the Middle East
- Khorkhog – Mongolia
- Kibbeh nayyeh – a national dish of Lebanon, prepared with raw lamb or beef, fine bulgur and spices
- Kleftiko - Cyprus, Greece
- Kokoretsi – Turkish; found throughout the Balkans and Azerbaijan
- Kol böreği – Turkey
- Kuurdak – Central Asia
- Laal maans – Rajasthan, India
- Lahndi – Afghanistan
- Lamb chop – Various; found around the world.
- Lamb fries – Various; found around the world. In the United States, they are most commonly found in Kentucky.
- Lamb Skewers - Xinjiang, China
- Lamb in Chilindrón – Spain
- Lamb's fry – Found in various English-speaking nations; the recipe and definition varies according to locality.
- Lancashire hotpot – Lancashire, northern England.
- Lechazo – Spain
- Lunggoi Katsa – Tibet
- Macon – Scotland
- Mallow with lamb – Aegean Sea region; popular in both Greece and Turkey
- Mandi – Yemen
- Mansaf – Various Arab nations
- Méchoui – North Africa
- Mixiote – Mexico
- Moussaka – Various; found throughout the Balkans and the Middle East
- Murtabak – Arab; found throughout the Islamic world, especially in Islamic Southeast Asia
- Mutton hot pot – Taiwan
- Mutton pulao – Indian Subcontinent
- Naan qalia – India
- Navarin – France
- Paomo – China; found in the Shaanxi region
- Pasanda – Indian Subcontinent
- Pieds paquets – France; found in the southeast
- Pinchitos – Spain; found in Andalusia and Extremadura
- Pinnekjøtt – Norway
- Pleşcoi sausages – Romania
- Powsowdie – Scotland
- Qeema – Indian Subcontinent
- Quzi – Iraq.
- Rack of lamb – Various Western nations
- Ribberull – Norway
- Roast lamb with laver sauce – Wales
- Rogan josh – Jammu and Kashmir, India
- Saleeg – Saudi Arabia
- Sajji – Pakistan
- Sarburma – Ukraine; invented by Crimean Tatars
- Scotch broth – Scotland
- Scotch pie – Scotland
- Scouse – Either England or Norway
- Sfiha – Lebanon
- Sha Shingbee – Tibet
- Sheep's trotters – Various
- Shuwaa – Various Arab nations; popular in the Levant
- Shepherd's pie – United Kingdom
- Skerpikjøt – Faroe Islands
- Skilpadjies – South Africa
- Smalahove – Norway
- Sodd – Norway
- Sosatie – South Africa
- Squab pie – prepared with mutton and apples – England
- Stuffed intestines – Lebanon
- Svið – Iceland
- Särä – Finland
- Tavë kosi – Albania
- Tomato bredie – South Africa
- Tripoux – France
- Wazwan – Kashmir
Lamb dishes

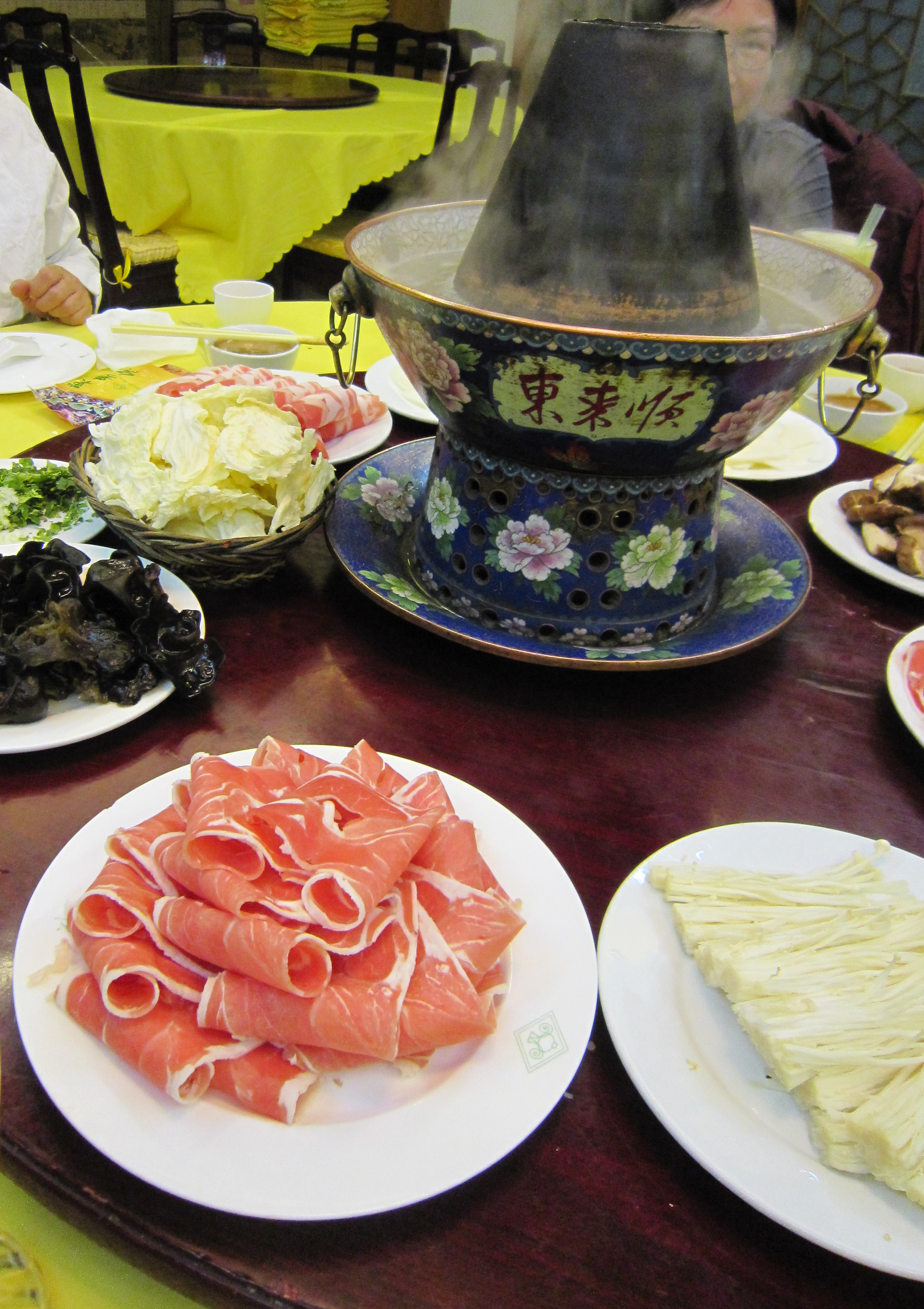
Instant-boiled mutton is a Chinese hot-pot dish.

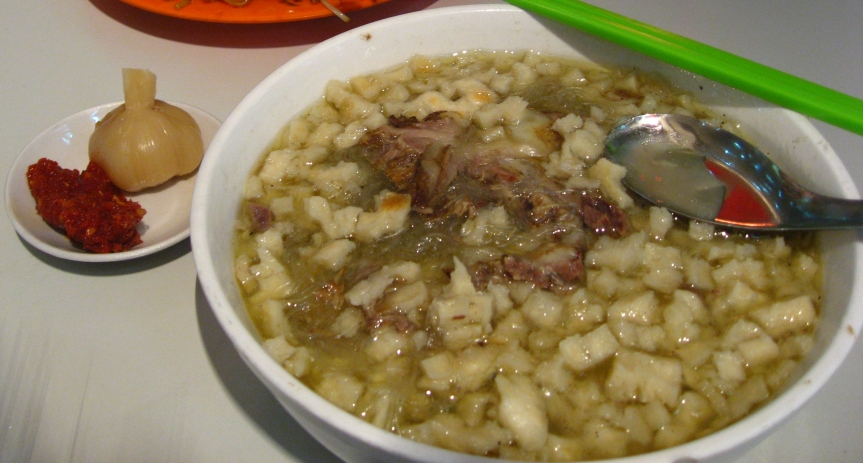
Paomo is a specialty of Shaanxi cuisine and is a typical food eaten in the city of Xi'an. It is a hot stew of chopped-up steamed leavened bread cooked in lamb broth and served with lamb meat. Beef is also sometimes used.

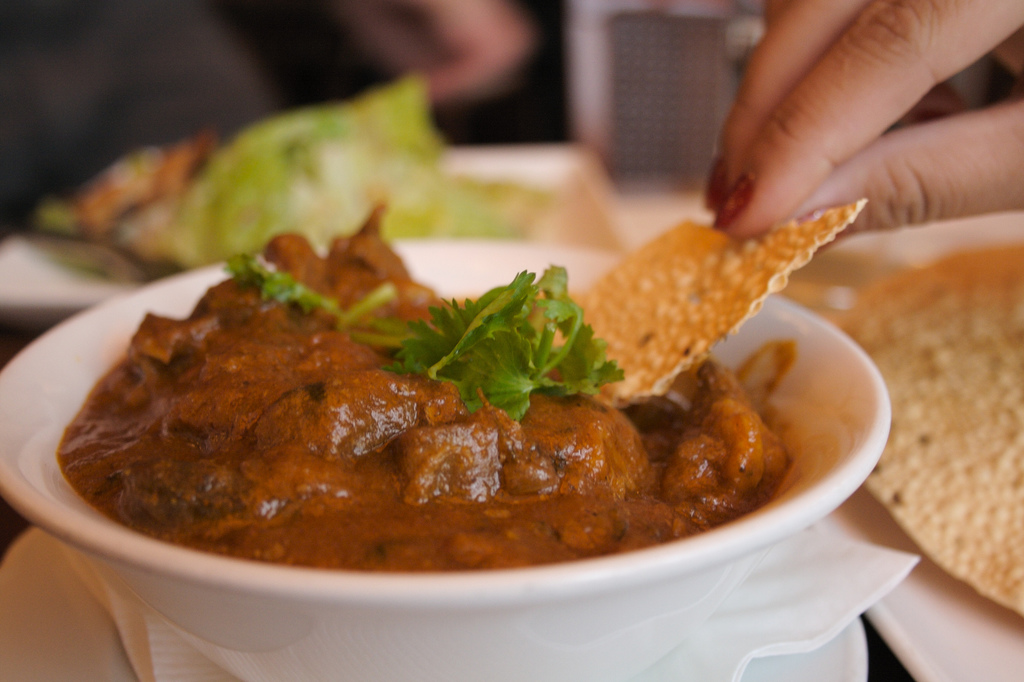
Rogan josh is an aromatic lamb dish native to the Indian subcontinent, and is one of the signature recipes of Kashmiri cuisine.

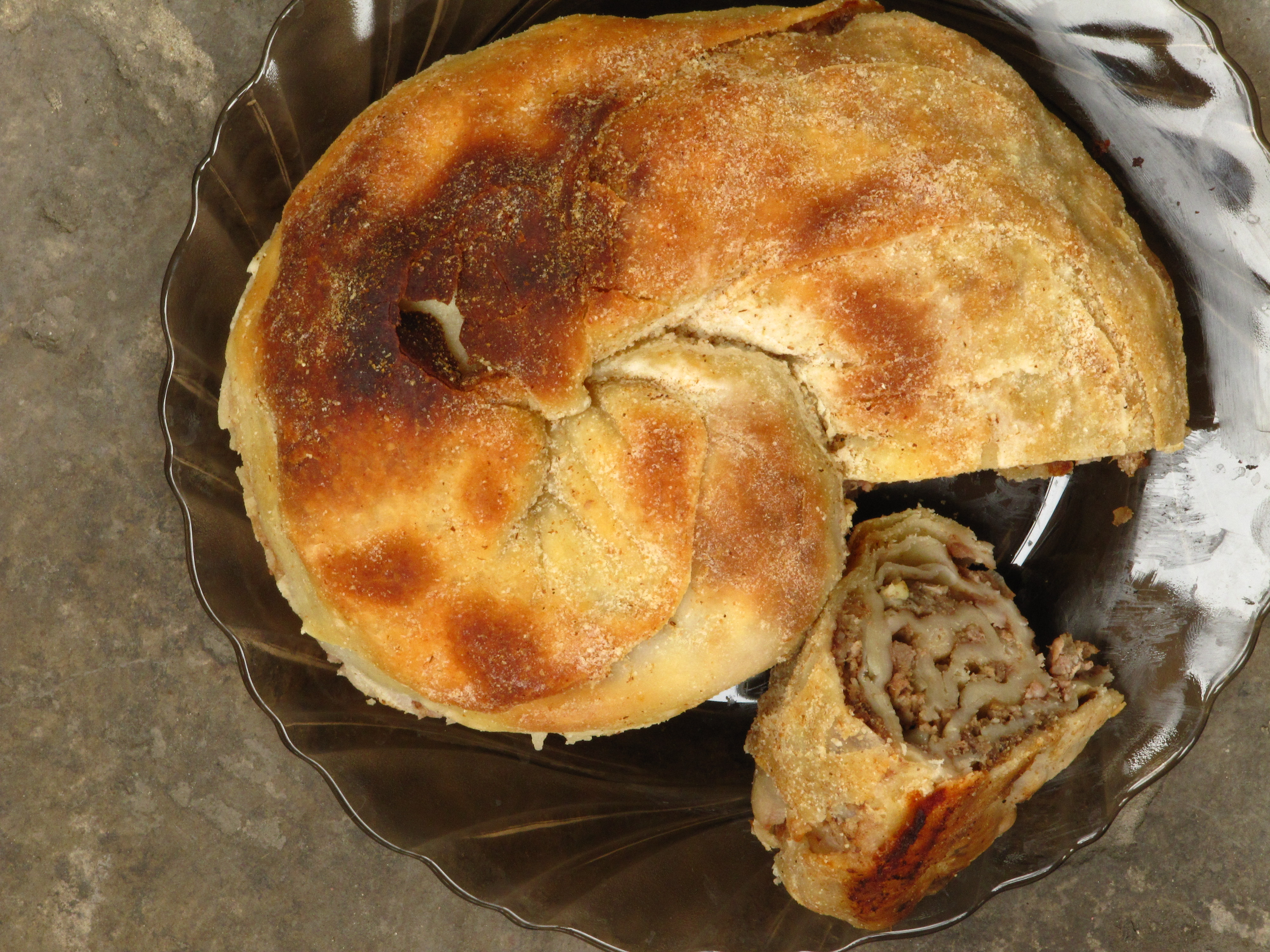
Sarburma is a Crimean traditional meat pie dish originating among ethnic Crimeans. It is a widespread snack in Crimea. Its main ingredients are lamb and dough.

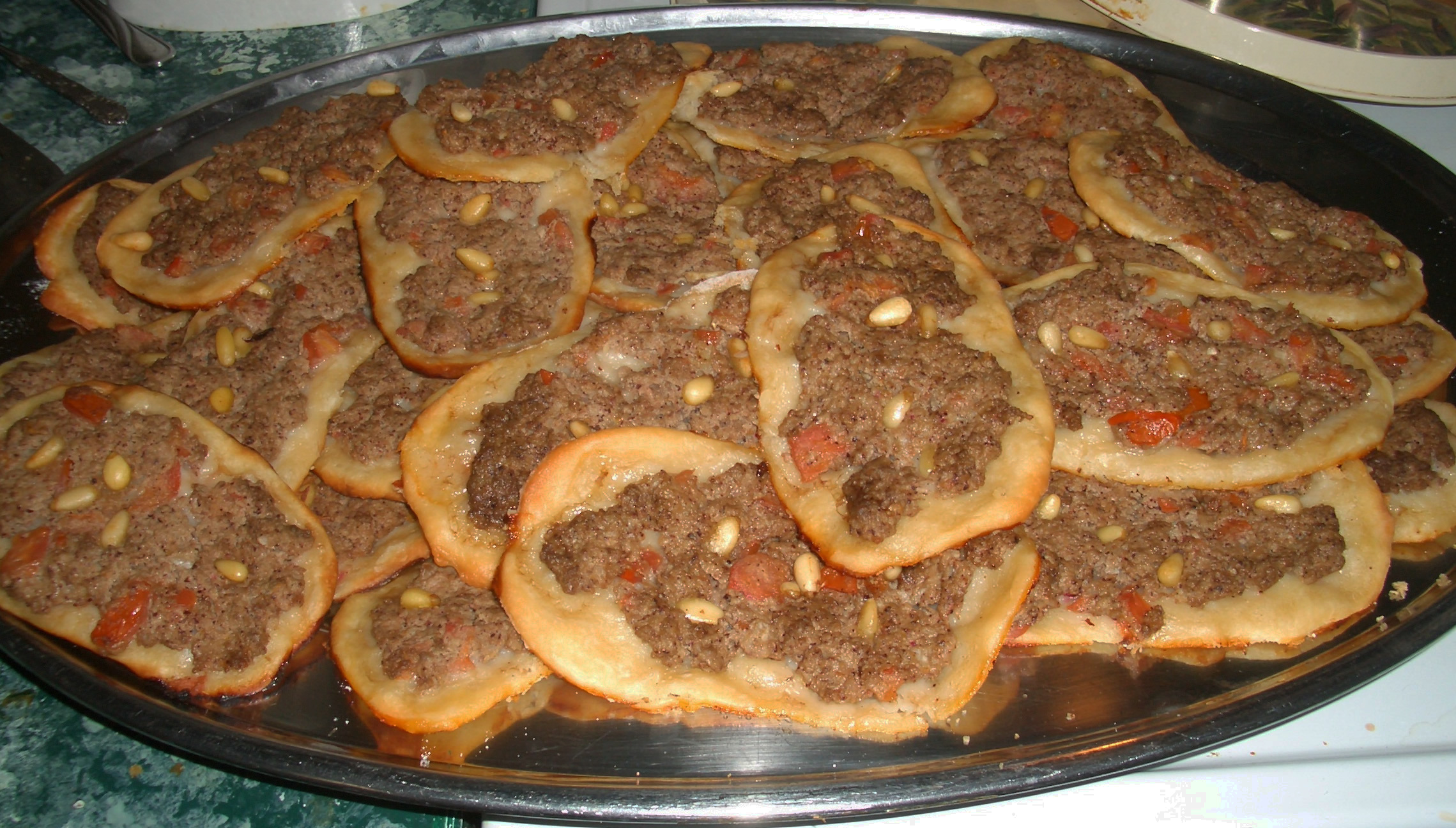
Sfiha, also known as Arab pizza, is a dish originating from the Arabian Peninsula and Levant, introduced in Brazil by Levantine immigrants.

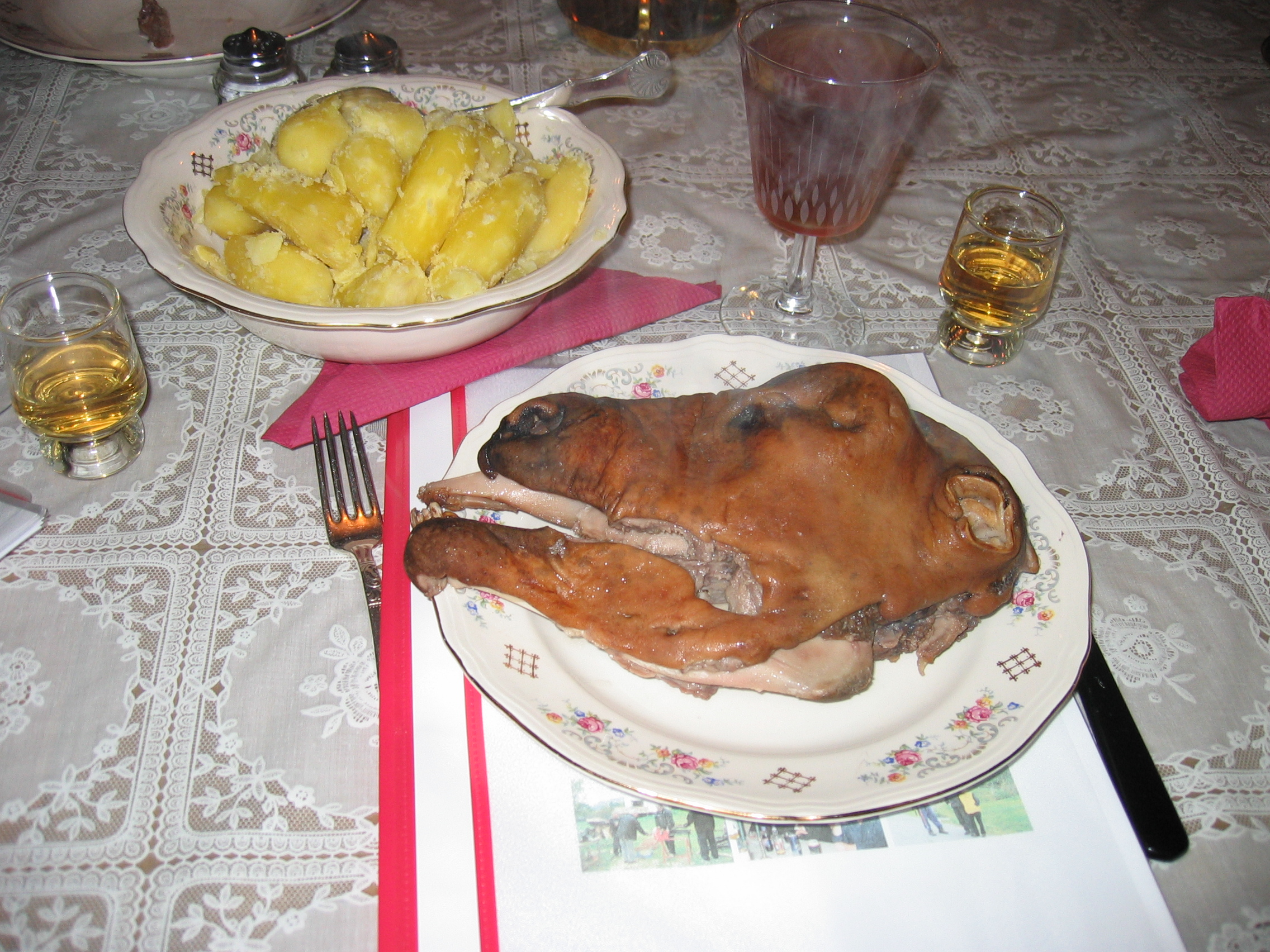
Smalahove is a Western Norwegian traditional dish made from a sheep's head, originally eaten before Christmas.

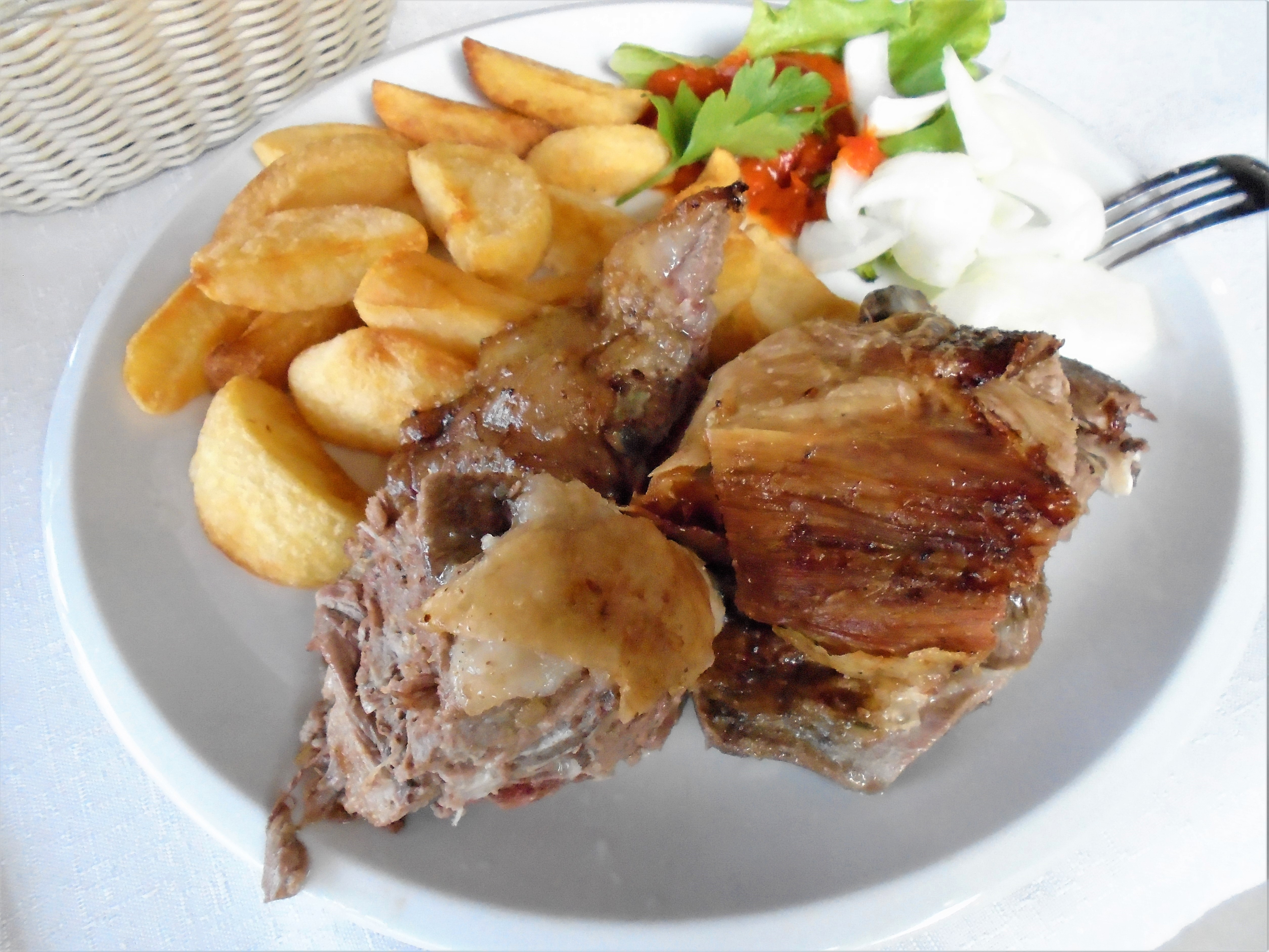
Roast lamb from a roasting spit, served with potato and onion in Istria County, part of Croatian cuisine

== See also ==
- List of beef dishes
- List of chicken dishes
- List of fish dishes
- List of kebabs
- List of meatball dishes
- List of pork dishes
- List of seafood dishes
- Mutton Renaissance Campaign
