= Fårikål =

Lamb and cabbage stew from Norway

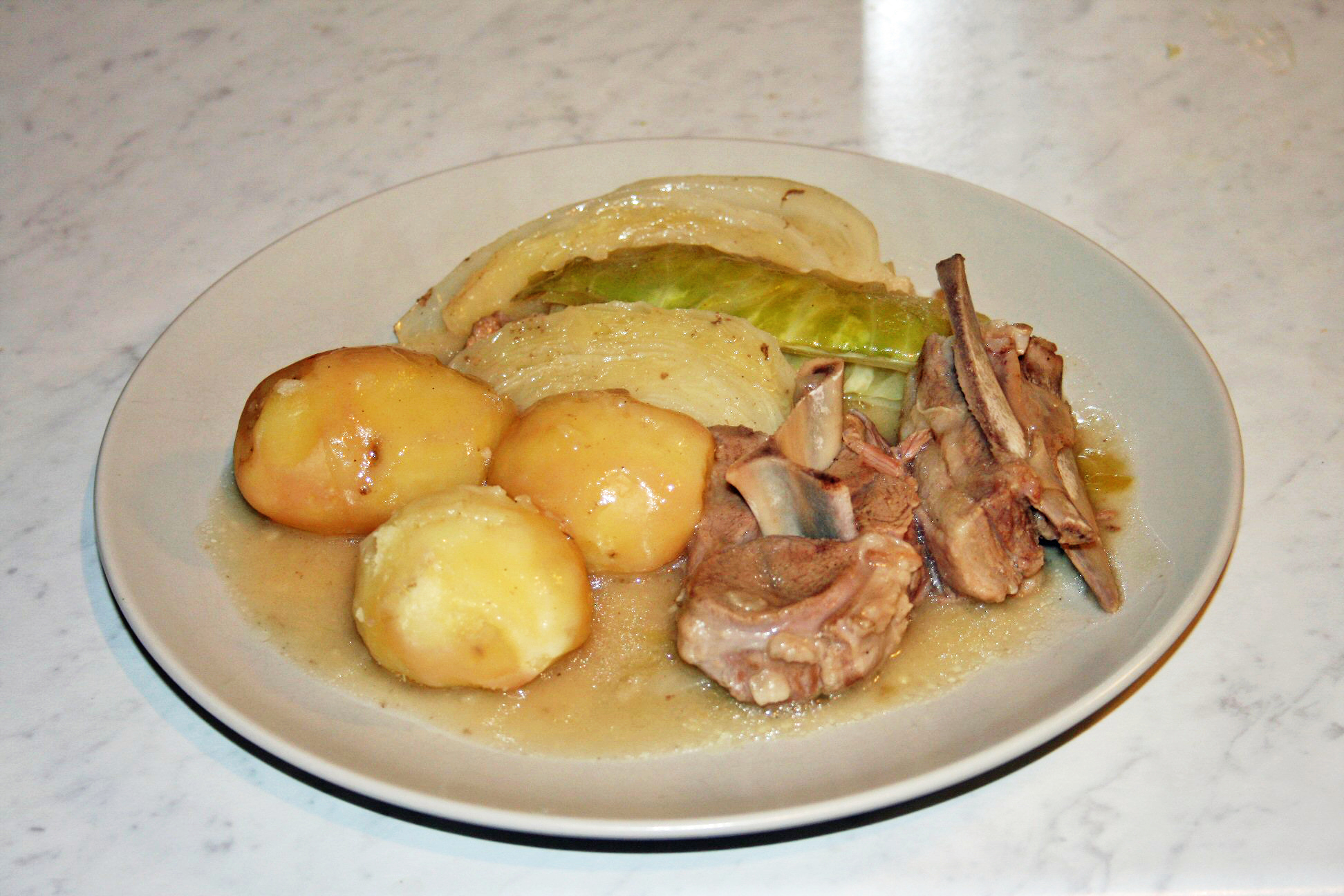
- Type: Stew
- Place of origin: Norway
- Region or state: Norway
- Main ingredients: Mutton with bone, cabbage, black pepper, wheat flour

Fårikål (Norwegian pronunciation: [ˈfòːrɪkɔɫ, ˈfɔ̀rːɪkɔɫ]) is a traditional Norwegian dish and the country's national dish. It consists of pieces of mutton with bone, cabbage, whole black pepper, and occasionally a little wheat flour, cooked for several hours in a casserole, traditionally served with potatoes boiled in their skins. The dish is typically prepared in early autumn, and over 70% of the Norwegian population reports eating the dish at least once during this time period.

Fårikål Feast Day is celebrated on the last Thursday in September each year.

== Name ==
Fårikål is a compound word literally meaning "mutton in cabbage". The name was amended from Danish "gås i hvidkål" (goose in white cabbage).

== In popular culture ==
On September 29, 2012, Guinness World Records approved the World Record of making the largest portion of fårikål ever. The result was 594.2 kg fårikål, prepared to be finished at the same time, consisting of 60% lamb and 40% cabbage. The event happened in Spikersuppa, Oslo, Norway, and there were 10,000 guests present.

In the 1970s, fårikål was elected national dish of Norway by the popular radio programme Nitimen. In 2014, after the controversial decision by the food and agriculture minister Sylvi Listhaug to hold a new competition, it was reconfirmed as the national dish.

== See also ==
- List of lamb dishes
- List of stews
