= Tavë kosi =

Albanian baked mutton and yougurt dish

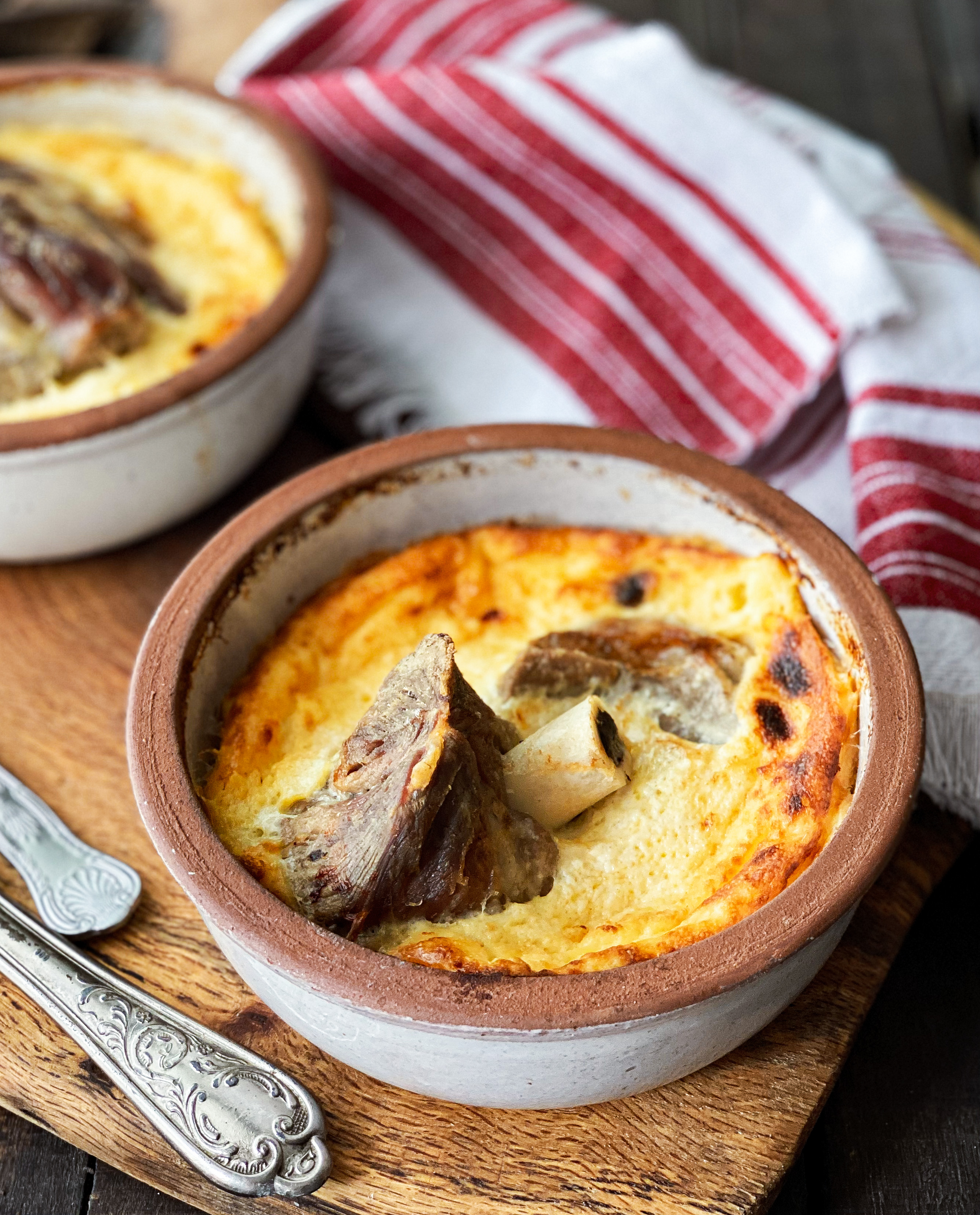
- Alternative names: Elbasan tava
- Course: Main
- Place of origin: Albania
- Serving temperature: Warm
- Main ingredients: mutton, yogurt with eggs (replacing soured milk), wheat flour, butter
- Ingredients generally used: Rice
- Variations: Tavë kosi with chicken, Elbasan tava with Béchamel sauce

Tavë kosi ("yogurt casserole"), also known as Tavë Elbasani, is a traditional Albanian baked dish consisting of mutton and rice covered with a mixture of yogurt, eggs, butter and flour before being baked in the oven. Chicken may be used as an alternative to mutton, in which case the dish is known as "tavë kosi me mish pule". It is commonly seasoned with ingredients such as salt, black pepper, garlic and oregano.

Thought to originate from the city of Elbasan, tavë kosi is regarded as one of the national dishes of Albania. The dish is also popular in neighboring countries, including Greece, Kosovo, North Macedonia and Turkey, where it is commonly known as "Elbasan tava", a name derived from its place of origin.

== Ingredients ==
To prepare this dish for 4 people, you will need:

- Mutton or goat meat: 500 g
- Yogurt: 1 liter
- Rice: ½ coffee cup
- Eggs: 3
- Butter: 100 g
- Flour: 2 tablespoons
- Salt: to taste
- Black pepper: to taste

== Preparation ==
Wash and pat dry the meat, then cut it into serving-sized pieces. Place the pieces in a baking dish, season with salt and drizzle with oil. Bake in a preheated oven at 180 °C (356 °F), occasionally basting the meat with its own juices. For a more tender result, the meat may be boiled for about 30 minutes before baking.

Approximately 15 minutes before the meat is fully cooked, add the rice and about half a glass of hot meat broth to the baking dish. Remove from the oven and allow it to cool slightly.

Meanwhile, combine the yogurt and salt in a bowl and mix thoroughly. Add the eggs one at a time, stirring continuously, then gradually incorporate the flour until a smooth mixture is obtained. Finally, add the remaining butter.

Pour the yogurt mixture over the meat and rice, stirring gently to distribute it evenly. Return the dish to the oven and bake for a further 15 minutes, or until the surface is lightly golden.

== See also ==
- List of lamb dishes
