= Navarin (food) =

French lamb or mutton stew

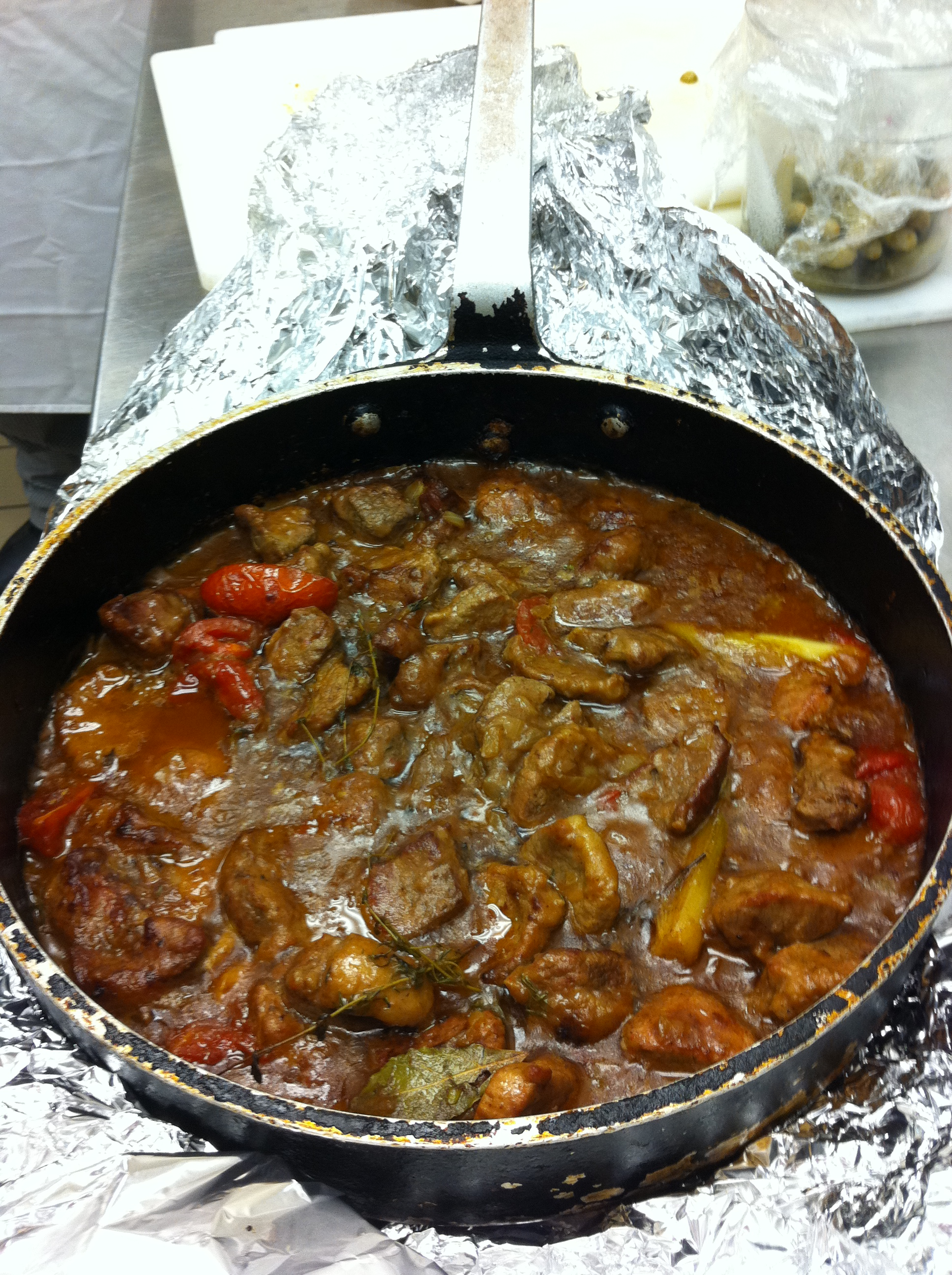
- Navarin printanier
- Type: Stew
- Place of origin: France
- Main ingredients: Lamb or mutton, turnips, onions, potatoes

Navarin is a French ragoût (stew) of lamb or mutton. If made with lamb and vegetables available fresh in the spring, it is called navarin printanier (spring stew). The dish was familiar in French cookery well before it acquired the name "navarin" in the mid-19th century; there are several theories about the origin of the current name.

== History and etymology ==
The dish was traditionally known as Haricot de mouton – the term is unrelated to the haricot bean and derives from the old French hericoq, a stew. François Massialot's 1693 edition of Le cuisinier royal et bourgeois gives details of a haricot of mutton chops with turnips. The name "navarin" was introduced in the mid-19th century. In 1877 the food writer E. S. Dallas wrote, "Navarin is a stupid word which has arisen from a desire to get rid of the unintelligible and misleading name, Haricot de mouton, without falling back on the vulgar phrase, Ragoût de mouton" [mutton stew].

According to the Dictionnaire de l'Académie française the name is from navet – turnip, one of the main ingredients. Alternative derivations have been proposed. Larousse Gastronomique comments, "the dish is popularly supposed to have been named after the Battle of Navarino" to celebrate the 1827 victory of France and its allies, and some sources accept this. The Oxford English Dictionary dates the term from 1866, and calls it a "humorous alteration of navet ... apparently after the Battle ... or perhaps alluding to the dish as characteristic of Navarre".

== Ingredients ==
The recipes for many traditional French dishes differ, sometimes greatly, from region to region, but there is wide agreement about the essentials of a navarin. Auguste Escoffier, Madame Saint-Ange, Eugénie Brazier, Marcel Boulestin, Elizabeth David, Craig Claiborne, Jane Grigson, and the co-authors of Mastering the Art of French Cooking, Simone Beck, Louisette Bertholle and Julia Child, all specify the same basic ingredients: mutton or lamb, turnips, onions and potatoes. The printanier – spring – version is no longer necessarily seasonal: Beck et al note that the additional peas and French beans that distinguish it are available frozen all year round.

== Sources ==
- Beck, Simone; Louisette Bertholle; Julia Child (2012) [1961]. Mastering the Art of French Cooking, Volume One. London: Particular. ISBN 978-0-241-95339-6.
- Boulestin, Marcel (1989). Classic French recipes of X. Marcel Boulestin. London: Robinson. ISBN 978-1-85487-013-1.
- Brazier, Eugénie; Moreau, Roger (2015) [2004]. La Mère Brazier: The Mother of Modern French Cooking. London: Modern Books. ISBN 978-1-906761-84-4.
- Claiborne, Craig (1999). The Best of Craig Claiborne. New York: Time Books. OCLC 1285463850.
- Dallas, E. S. (1877). Kettner's Book of the Table. London: Dulau. OCLC 771590401.
- David, Elizabeth (1999) [1980]. Elizabeth David Classics. London: Grub Street. ISBN 978-1-902304-27-4.
- David, Elizabeth (2008) [1960]. French Provincial Cooking. London: Folio Society. OCLC 809349711.
- Escoffier, Auguste (1903). Le guide culinaire: aide-mémoire de cuisine pratique. Paris: Art culinaire. OCLC 1202722258.
- Grigson, Jane (1998). Jane Grigson's Vegetable Book. London: Penguin. ISBN 978-0-14-027323-6.
- Massialot, François (1693). Le cuisinier royal et bourgeois. Paris: Charles de Sercy. OCLC 1157173681.
- Montagné, Prosper (1976). Larousse Gastronomique. London: Hamlyn. OCLC 1285641881.
- Montagné, Prosper (2001). Larousse Gastronomique. London: Hamlyn. ISBN 978-0-60-060235-4.
- Saint-Ange, E. (2005). La bonne cuisine de Madame E. Saint-Ange. Berkeley: Ten Speed Press. OCLC 1285661274.

== See also ==
- List of stews
- List of lamb dishes
