= Grjúpán =

Icelandic dish of sheep lungs

Grjúpán (Icelandic pronunciation: [ˈkrjuːpˌauːn]) is an Icelandic dish that was eaten in earlier centuries in Iceland. It consisted of the lungs of a sheep which was smoked with added salt and water.

The word "grjúpán" has also long been used as a synonym of another kind of Icelandic mutton sausage, bjúga.

== See also ==
- List of lamb dishes
- List of smoked foods
