= Lahndi (food) =

Pashtun dried meat dish

Lahndi (or prescriptive; Landai), (Pashto; لاندی ['lan: da'ɪ), is a cured meat dish common in Pashtun cuisine of salt-cured meat mostly reɡions with dry and cold weather. Consumption of lahndi is common during the winter months. Sheep are specially fattened so that their flesh may be more suitable for preparing lahndi.

== Method ==
Lahndi is usually prepared from lamb and sheep, although it can also be made from beef. It is prepared as follows. First a lamb or sheep is slaughtered in the Islamic way, i.e., halal. Then the wool is separated in a proper and skilled way, leaving only the skin. After that, the remaining hairs on the skin are burned away with fire, after which the meat is cleaned. Then the meat is cut into smaller pieces and rubbed with salt to prevent bacteria. It is also rubbed with asafoetida, which is like garlic and serves as a preservative. Having been thus prepared, the meat is strung on lahndi poles (tall poles with crosspieces which stand outside most Afghan mud-houses and serve as winter larders).

The best time to prepare lahndi is December, when the meat dries out within fifteen days if it is cold enough. It is commonly eaten in winter to keep a person warm and help them face the extreme weather.

== See also ==
- List of dried foods
- List of lamb dishes
