= Pieds paquets =

Traditional Marseilles dish

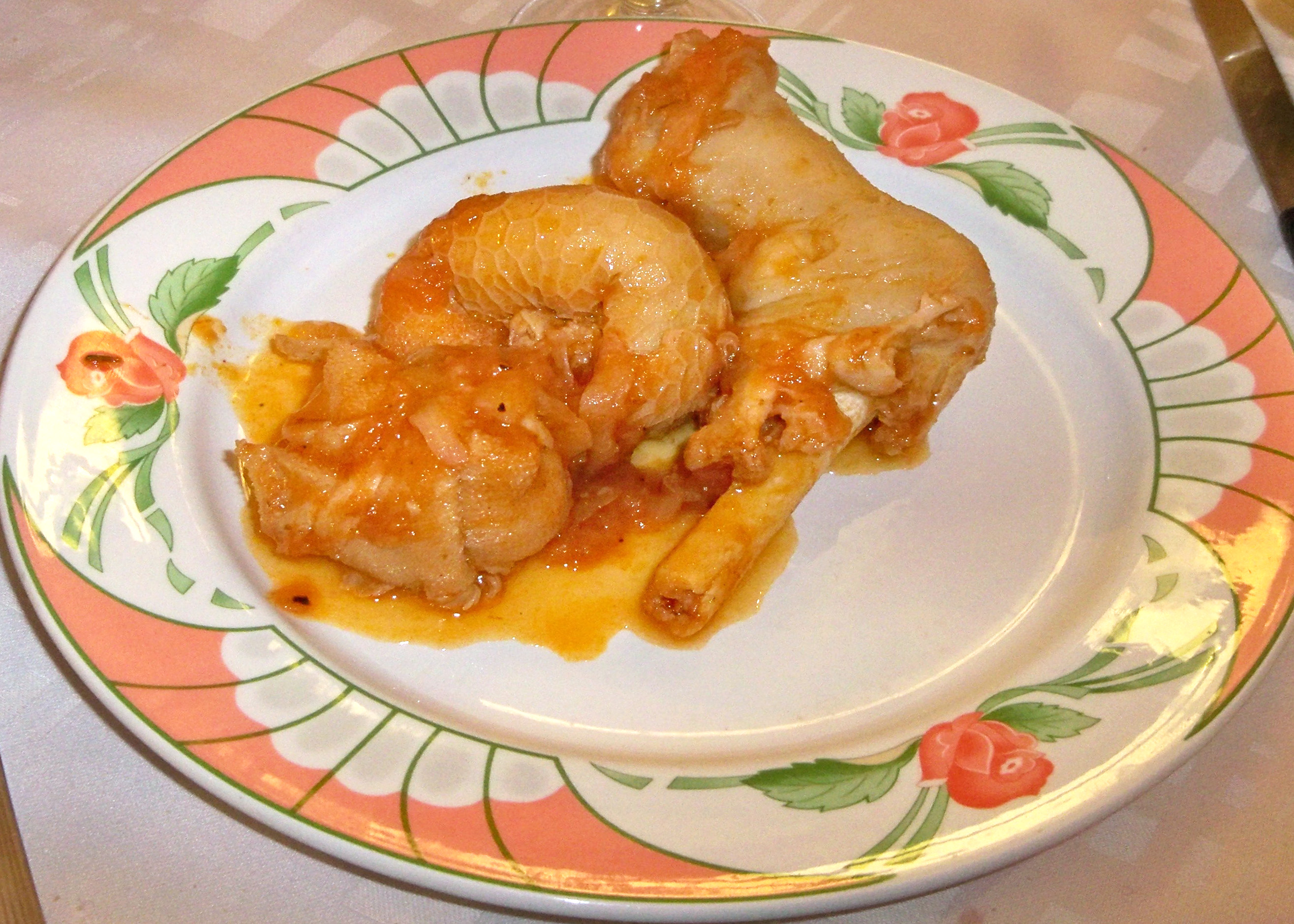
- A plate of Sisteron-style pied paquet
- Alternative names: Pied et paquets
- Type: Offal
- Course: Main course
- Place of origin: France
- Region or state: Provence
- Associated cuisine: French cuisine
- Serving temperature: Warm
- Main ingredients: sheep's feet; Tripe; salt pork; garlic; white wine; tomato sauce
- Similar dishes: tripes à la niçoise, tripo à la reboulado

Pieds paquets or pied et paquets (literally, feet packet or feet and packages in French; Occitan: Pès paquets, Pé e paquetons) is a local dish and culinary specialty of Marseille and Sisteron but also commonly found in much of Southeastern France. It consists of sheep's feet and stuffed sheep's tripe stewed together.

== Preparation ==
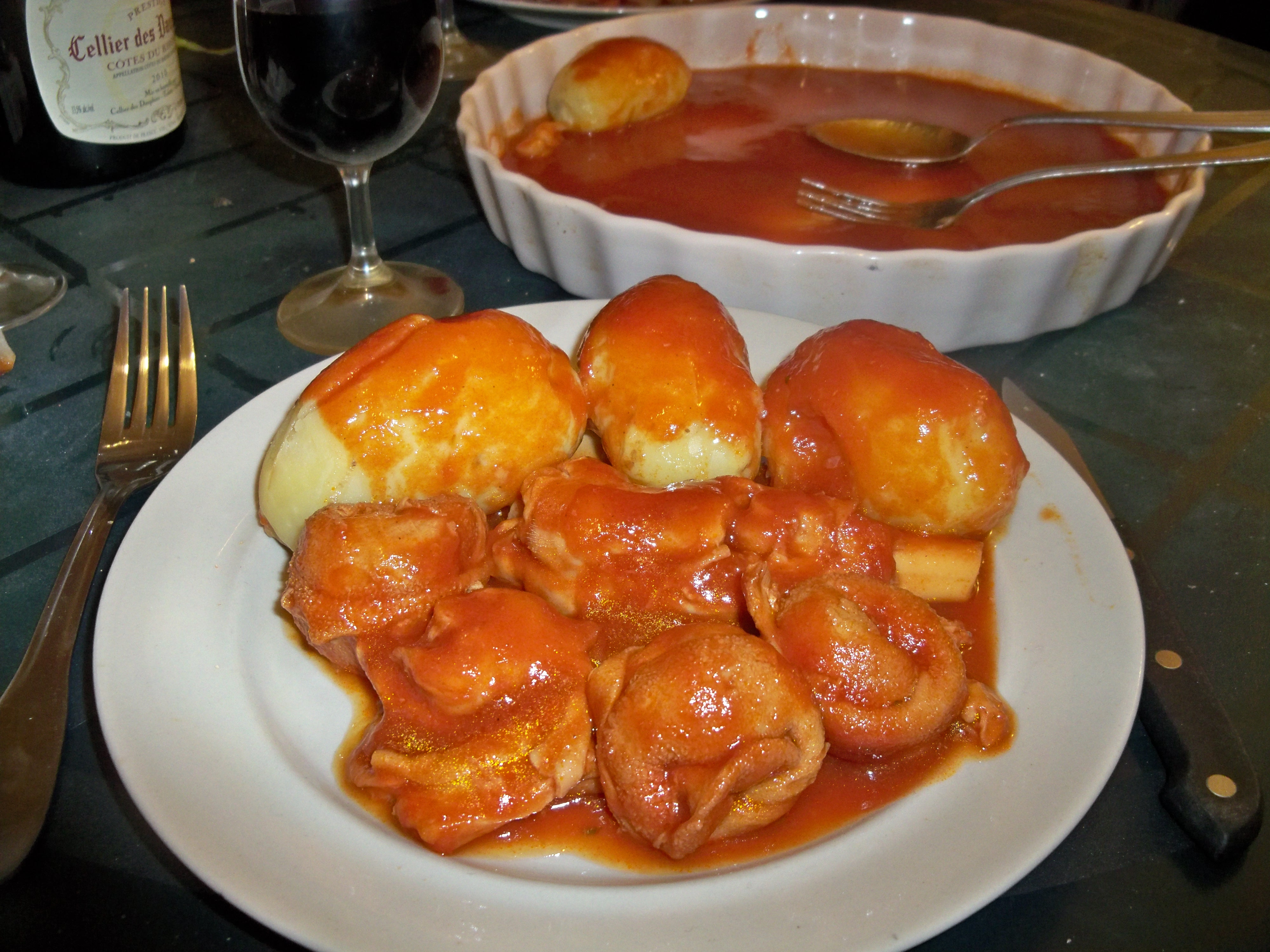
A plate of Marseille-style pied paquet

Writing in 1958, Waverley Root observed that although the packages used to be cooked with calves' feet, that was no longer the case except in Nice, where the dish was called tripes à la niçoise. If using sheep's feet, the hair on them is seared off, then the feet are placed in the bottom of the pot in which the packages will be stewed.

To make the packages, sheep's tripe is cleaned and cut into four to eight squares. Each piece is stuffed with onions, parsley, garlic, and salt pork before being rolled and wrapped into a small pouch or package. The stuffed offal is then stewed for several hours in a white wine and tomato sauce.

The feet and stuffed offal can also be cooked without tomato sauce, in which case it is eaten with a vinaigrette and known as tripo à la reboulado.

== See also ==
- List of lamb dishes
