= Lamb's fry =

Lamb offal served as food

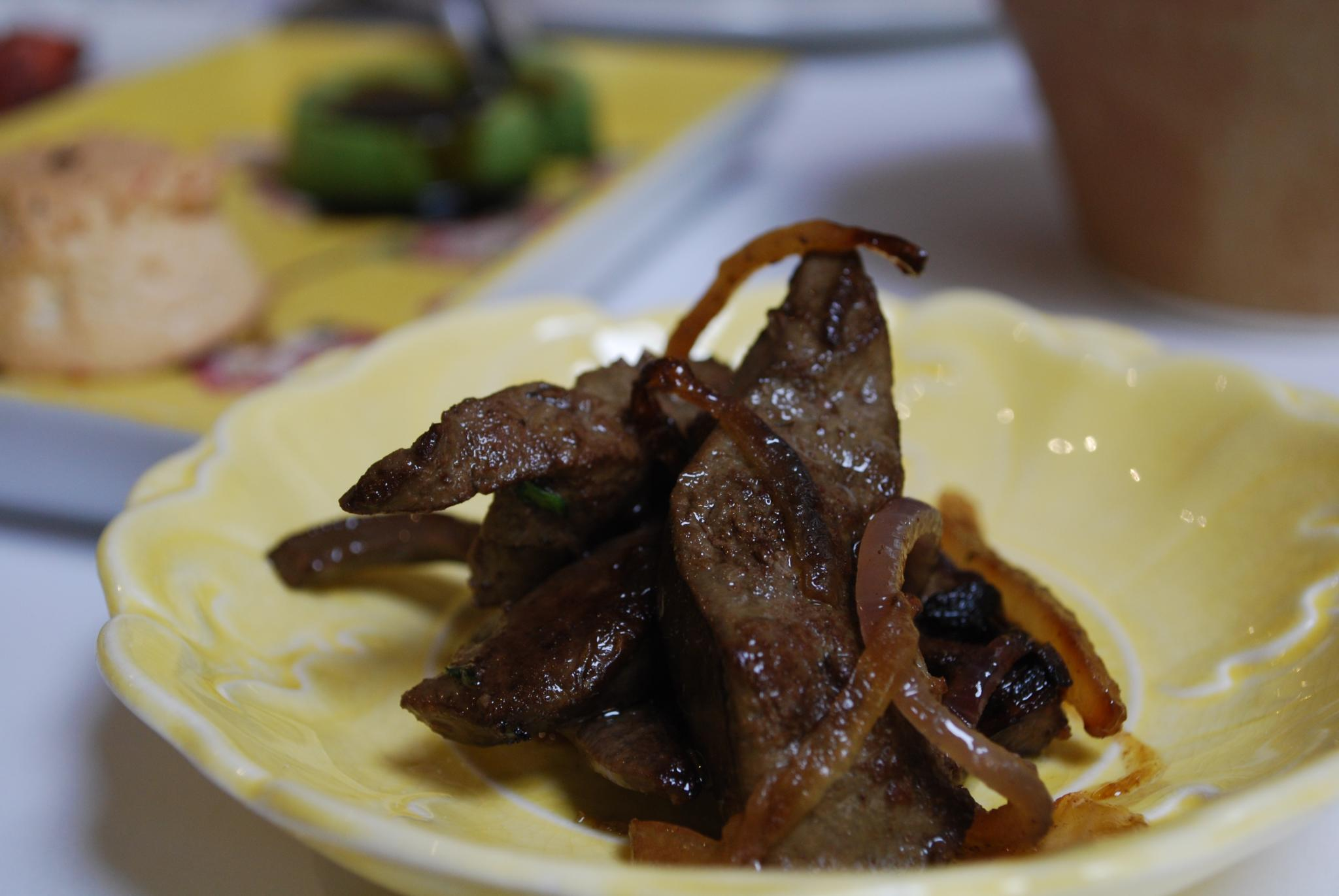
Lamb's fry

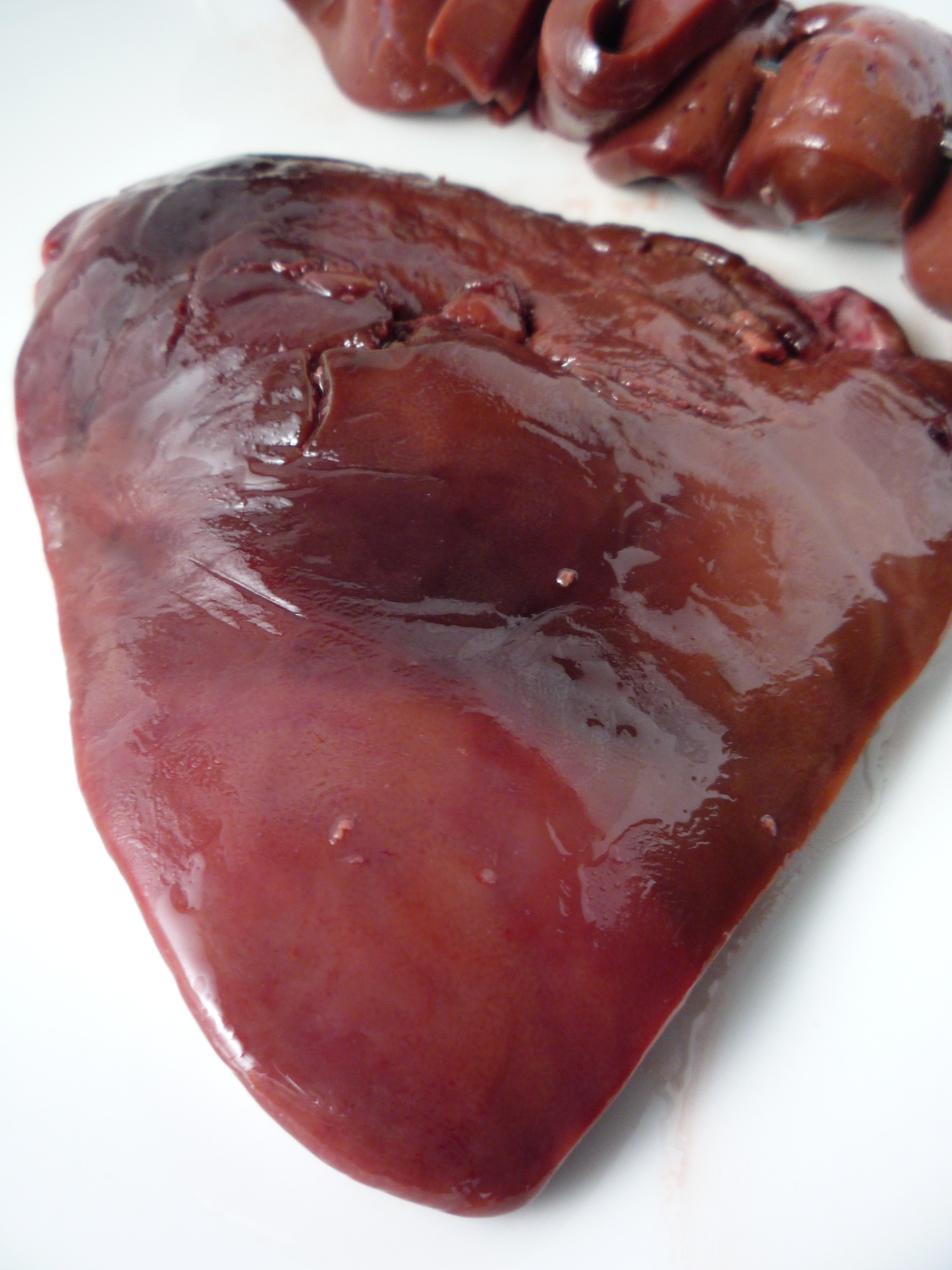
Lamb liver before cooking

Lamb's fry is lamb offal served as food, including the testicles, liver, sweetbreads, heart, kidneys, and sometimes the brain and abdominal fat—or some combination thereof.

In Australia and New Zealand, lamb's fry is specifically the liver; in the United States, "lamb fries" (q.v.) are specifically the testicles. In the United Kingdom, it was all offal, though recently testicle has become rare.

== History ==
Walker's Hibernian Magazine mentions "breakfasts of nice stew'd lamb's fry" eaten on the day of Swanhop in 1786. In 1929, a Country Life cookery supplement described it as an "old Devon breakfast dish". Fanny Cradock wrote that it was once popular as a breakfast dish before World War II.

== Preparation ==
Lamb's fry is typically sliced, breaded, and pan-fried, and served with bacon, onions and a gravy made with the juices. The oldest known published recipe of this type is from 1808.

== Popularity ==
"Lamb's fry and bacon" was once very popular as pub food and still relatively popular in Australia as pub counter meals and as a breakfast dish.

== See also ==
- List of lamb dishes
