= Kairi ka do pyaza =

Lamb dish from India

- Course: Main
- Place of origin: India
- Main ingredients: Onions, unripe green mango

Kairi ka do pyaza is a lamb curry with unripe green mangoes. Its origin is from Hyderabadi cuisine, and is popular among the city's Muslims. Dopiaza is an onion gravy preparation with a souring agent. Various main ingredients are used to prepare different versions of do pyaza. Tomatoes, lemons, gooseberries or unripe green mangoes are the usual souring agents used. One can also prepare a vegetarian do pyaza without adding meat. The acetic flavor of the unripe sour green mangoes in the current recipe adds a distinct kick to the curry.

== See also ==
- List of lamb dishes
