= Mutton pulao =

Mutton pulao is a dish fairly common in North Indian, South Indian, Pakistani and Turkish cuisine that incorporates mutton into a rice pilaf.

The rice used is almost invariably basmati or a close variant. Even though mutton pulao resembles mutton biryani in many respects, there are subtle differences, particularly with respect to the spices used.

== See also ==
- List of lamb dishes
- Pakistani meat dishes
