= Chekdirme =

Turkmen plate

Chekdirme (Turkmen: Çekdirme) is a Turkmen traditional food in Turkmenistan that is cooked simultaneously with rice, meat (usually mutton or lamb), tomato paste or tomato and onions with oil, water and add-ons such as salt, turmeric and pepper.

This dish is prepared in a cast-iron pot called a "Qazan". Initially small pieces of meat are fried in oil, then onions and tomatoes, or tomato paste are added. The meat is boiled, and rice is added. The water level should be a knuckle above the rice, then the heat is decreased until the rice has cooked.

== See also ==
- List of lamb dishes
