= Lamb in chilindrón =

Lamb stew from Spanish cuisine

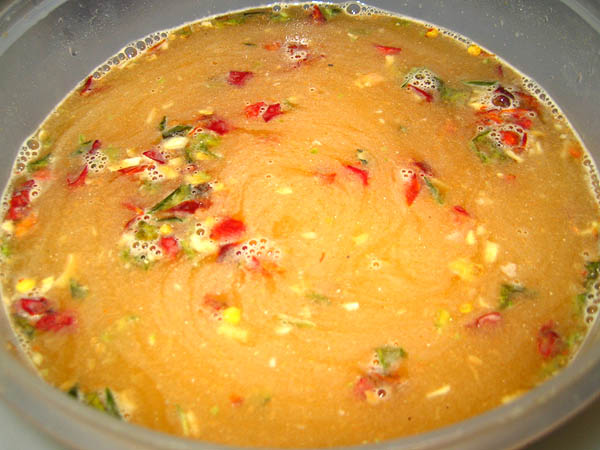
Lamb in chilindrón in a caldoso texture

Lamb in chilindrón (sometimes lamb chilindrón) is one of the typical dishes of the cuisine of Navarra, Aragon, La Rioja, and some parts of the Basque County (where it is called txilidron). It is a stew in tomato sauce and vegetables that has lamb meat in pieces. Although nowadays it can be enjoyed throughout the year, its consumption in a traditional way was linked to spring, and above all, to festive days and pilgrimages.

== Features ==
The main aroma that this dish provides comes from the use of peppers and choricero peppers. Depending on the recipe, usually one uses the leg of the lamb for the meat. The preparation with chilindrón raises among the experts a debate about whether or not to add tomato sauce. Its use is ideal in the preparation of the lamb. Some authors also extend their use to chicken. Be that as it may, it is a stew made with tomatoes, peppers, and onions. It is usually accompanied with potatoes and served very hot in a clay pot. The Navarre recipe suggests, as raw material, the use of lamb leg, but without skirt and establishes the differentiation with the way of doing in Aragon, where the red or green pepper and tomato are used, and whose version would be known in Navarre as "lamb in fritada". In addition to lamb, dried peppers, olive oil, water, garlic, parsley, lemon peel, and salt, some local variants add mushrooms, chips, or snails.

== Curiosities ==
- Ernest Hemingway puts this dish as one of the favorites during his stay in Spain.

== See also ==
- List of lamb dishes
- Roast lamb
- Trout to navarre

== Bibliography ==
- Various authors (1994). Cooking Manual. Madrid. ISBN 9788449501302. – in this book, a classic of Spanish gastronomic literature, the recipe is collected
