= Fennel with lamb =

- Region or state: Turkey, Greece
- Serving temperature: Hot

Fennel with lamb (Turkish: Arapsaçı yemeği) is a dish from the Aegean coast and Aegean Sea islands among both Turkish and Greek people.

== See also ==
- List of lamb dishes
