= Colocasia with lamb =

Type of food

- Region or state: Cyprus
- Serving temperature: Hot
- Main ingredients: taro, lamb, onion

Colocasia with lamb (Turkish: Kolokas yemeği, Greek: Κολοκάσι με αρνί) is a Middle Eastern dish, also common across Greece, Turkey and Cyprus. Ingredients include kolokas (taro), lamb chunks, onion, lemon juice, flour, butter, and salt.

== See also ==
- List of lamb dishes
