= Gosht =

Persian meat dish

گوشت
- Alternative names: Gosht
- Region or state: Middle East, Central Asia, Indian subcontinent
- Main ingredients: Goat meat
- Variations: Mutton, beef

Gosht or ghosht (Note: from Persian gosht and gulwa گوشت, meaning "meat" or "flesh" and "savoury", especially that of goat.) is tender meat cooked for a long time that is an ingredient in South Asian cuisine, Central Asian cuisine and Iranian cuisine.

In India, most gosht dishes include goat or mutton. In India, the term mutton is more likely to refer to the meat of a goat rather than that of an adult sheep, as it does elsewhere in the English-speaking world. When Indian dishes are adapted for Western diners, lamb is the meat most often used in the adaptation. This has led to a common misconception that gosht means "lamb".

The popular Indian subcontinental dish of Biryani as well as the Afghan dish of Biryan use Gosht as a primary ingredient.

Some dishes include:

- Bhuna gosht, a curry with a thick, reduced sauce
- Karahi or Kadhai gosht, cooked in a traditional round-sided pot
- Raan gosht, roasted leg of mutton
- Dal gosht, with lentils or peas
- Nihari gosht, a meat stew
- Rara gosht, roasted mutton curry
- Namkeen gosht, predominantly goat or mutton
- Saag gosht, with cooked spinach leaves or mustard greens
- Biryani gosht, especially the non-vegetarian version of it
- Chelo Gosht, Iranian dish consisting of tender, savory lamb or goat meat (gosht) served with fragrant, saffron-infused rice (chelo) and often garnished with barberries and crispy onions

== See also ==
- Rogan josh, Kashmiri curried meat, often romanised as roghan ghosht
