= Rakı =

Sweetened, anise-flavored Turkish alcoholic drink

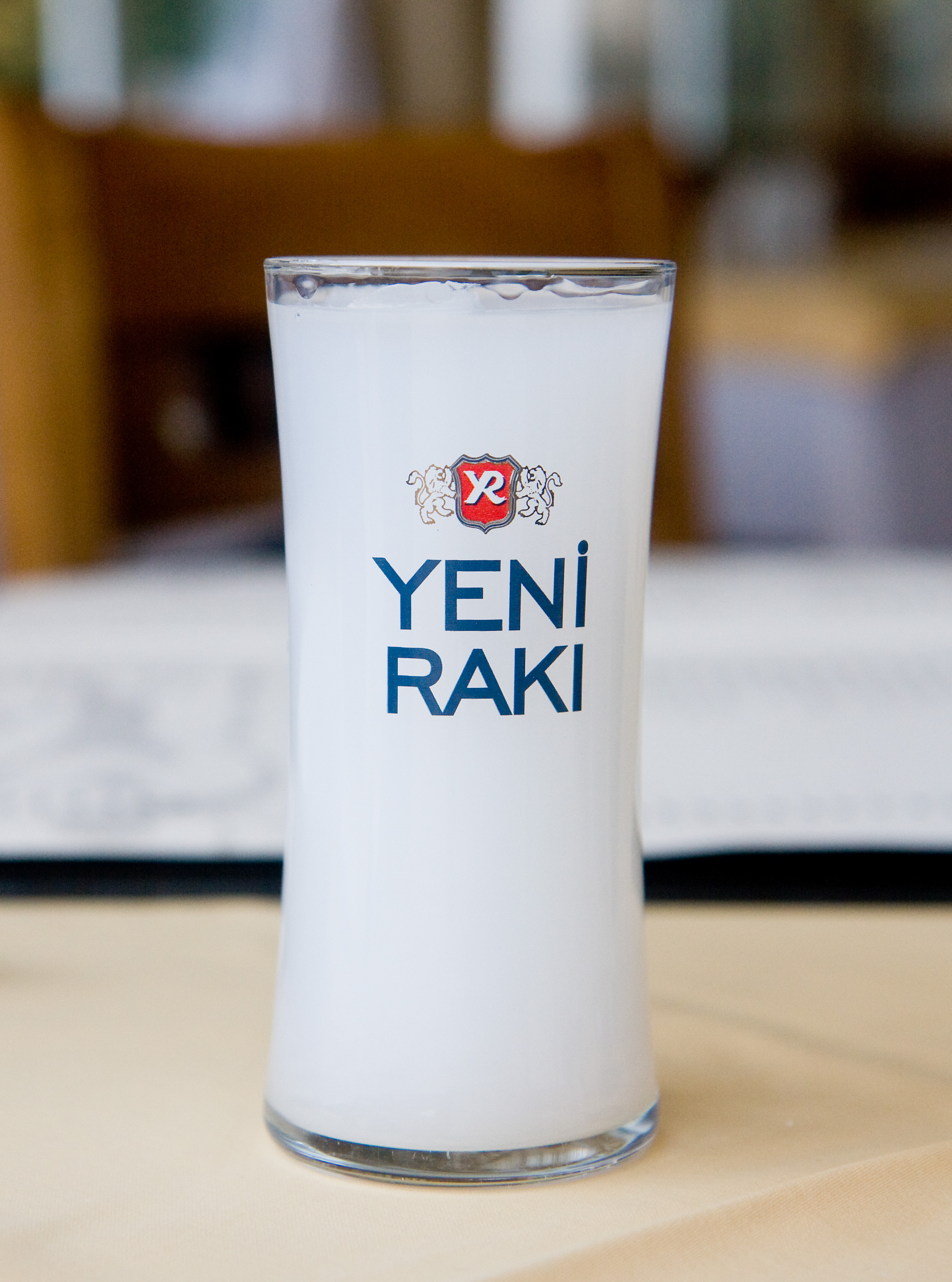
- Type: Spirit
- Origin: Turkey
- Introduced: Before 1630
- Alcohol by volume: 40–50%
- Proof (US): 80–100
- Colour: Transparent (milky white when mixed with water)
- Ingredients: Grape pomace, Aniseed (flavouring)
- Related products: Arak, absinthe, ouzo, pastis, sambuca

Rakı (/rɑːˈkiː/, Turkish pronunciation: [ɾaˈkɯ]) is an alcoholic beverage made of twice-distilled grape pomace and flavored with aniseed. It is a national drink of Turkey, and it is especially popular in the coastal regions. Among drinkers of alcoholic beverages, it is popular in Turkic countries and Caucasian countries as an apéritif. It is often served with seafood or meze. It is comparable to several other anise-flavored liqueurs such as pastis, ouzo, sambuca and arak. The alcoholic content of rakı must be at least 40% according to Turkish standard. The largest producer of raki is Diageo, which operates in Turkey through its subsidiary Mey İçki (acquired in 2011); Yeni Rakı is the largest brand. Rakı has been a registered geographical indication in Turkey since 2009, granting it legal protection as a spirit produced exclusively from Turkish-grown grapes and anise.

In many East Mediterranean and Balkan countries, the term raki is widely used to describe similar distilled alcoholic beverages. This shared terminology dates back to the Ottoman Empire, where raki became a generic term for distilled spirits. During Ottoman rule, the word spread across the empire's territories. In many of these regions, raki or rakia is still used to describe grape-based pomace brandies or other spirits, often with regional variations in production methods and flavour profiles. For example, in Turkey, rakı is flavoured with anise and is distinctively served diluted with water, creating a milky-white appearance. Similarly, in the Balkans, rakija (or its linguistic variants such as ракия in Bulgarian, ракија in Serbian, and rakija in Croatian) is a general term for fruit-based brandies, with local variations like plum, pear, or apricot based liquors.

In Crete, tsikoudia is also sometimes referred to informally as raki, particularly in the eastern parts of the island. This reflects the linguistic and cultural legacy of Ottoman influence in the region. Unlike the Turkish rakı, Cretan raki (tsikoudia) is not flavoured with anise and undergoes a single distillation, retaining the natural flavour of the grape pomace.

== Etymology ==
The term raki entered English from Turkish rakı. The Arabic word arak (Arabic: عرق [ʕaraq]), means "distilled", other variants being araka, araki, ariki. The Teleuts, who are a Turkic ethnic group living in Siberia, use the term arakı for wine and other alcoholic drinks. In Ancient Greek the grape was called ῥάξ (Greek pronunciation: [raks]).

The literary historian Abdülbaki Gölpınarlı identified the earliest known use of the word "rakı" in Turkish literature in the divan poet Fuzuli's mesnevi Beng ü Bâde, completed between 1510 and 1514, suggesting that rakı has at least a 500-year documented history. In a Spanish manuscript written in 1567 by an anonymous author, later discovered in 1905 and published under the title Viaje de Turquía, rakı is mentioned under the name raqui. The narrator, who had been a prisoner of the Ottomans between 1552 and 1556, recounts drinking rakı for the first time during his escape on the island of Lemnos.

== History ==
Where or when raki was first produced is unknown. It is first mentioned by the Ottoman explorer Evliya Çelebi during his travels in 1630. In his Book of Travels he reports that ancient people produced their own raki in small towns.

Until the last decades of the 19th century, the production of raki was done exclusively "at home", ie there was no mass industrial production. Colorless alcoholic beverages had long been consumed throughout the Mediterranean, known by various names: tsipouro, raki, arak, grappa. These are distilled from the by-products of wine, exploiting the vineyard as much as possible.

In the Ottoman Empire, until the 19th century, meyhanes run by Rûm (Greeks) and Albanians would mainly serve wine along with meze, due to religious restrictions imposed by various sultans.

During this period, rakı was produced by distillation of grape pomace (cibre) obtained during wine fermentation. When the amount of pomace was not sufficient, alcohol imported from Europe would be added. If aniseed was not added, it would take the name düz rakı ('straight rakı'), whereas rakı prepared with the addition of gum mastic was named sakız rakısı ('gum rakı') or mastikha (Greek: μαστίχη).

Some people state that the alcoholic beverage of Raki was made in eastern Anatolia from figs and other fruits that tasted like grapes. This alternative recipe in raki and raki culture was made due to certain economic challenges.

With the collapse of the Ottoman Empire and the establishment of the modern-day Republic of Turkey, grape-based rakı began to be distilled by the state-owned spirits monopoly Tekel, with the first factory production taking place in 1944 in İzmir. With increasing sugar beet production, Tekel also began to distill the alcohol from molasses, and a new brand of raki made from sugar-beet alcohol was introduced under the name Yeni Rakı ('new rakı'). Molasses gave Yeni Rakı a distinctive bitter taste and helped increase the drink's popularity.

Today, with increased competition from the private sector, and the privatization of Tekel in 2004, several new brands and types of raki have emerged, each with its own distinct composition and production method, although the overall qualities of the drink have generally been kept consistent. These include Efe Rakı, Çilingir Rakı, Mercan Rakı, Fasıl Rakı, Burgaz Rakı, Ata Rakı, and Anadolu Rakı.

=== Changing consumption trends ===
According to a 2025 Ipsos study, whisky consumption in Turkey had risen by 155% since 2020, while rakı consumption grew by 31% in the same period. Despite this shift, rakı remains the most-consumed traditional spirit in the country. Beer remains the most popular alcoholic beverage overall, with annual consumption reaching 1.2 billion litres. The study noted that gin and tequila were also gaining popularity, particularly among women.

== Legal status and geographical indication ==
Rakı is regulated both as an alcoholic beverage under specific Turkish provisions and as a food product under general food regulations. In 2009, the Turkish Patent Institute registered the geographical indication of "rakı," granting it legal protection as a product unique to Turkey. According to the geographical indication registration, rakı's distinctive character derives solely from grapes and anise cultivated in Turkey.

The legal definition of rakı was established with the amendment of Law No. 4250, which states: "Rakı, produced by distilling suma, a grape-based distillate, or suma mixed with agriculturally derived ethyl alcohol, a second time with anise seeds in traditional copper stills with a capacity of 5,000 litres or less, must be produced in Turkey, and at least 65% of the total alcohol in the product must be suma." The production process and raw material specifications are further detailed in the Turkish Food Codex Communiqué on Distilled Alcoholic Beverages (Communiqué no: 2016/55).

== Production ==
Raki is traditionally produced from raisin/grape spirit called suma that is distilled to a maximum of 94.55% abv. This spirit is not highly rectified spirit and unlike other flavoured spirits Raki producers consider that the suma has an important role to play in the flavour of Raki itself.

The suma, or suma mixed with highly rectified spirit, is diluted with water re-distilled with aniseed and the spirit is collected at around 79-80% abv. The flavoured distillate is diluted and sweetened and rested for minimum of 30 days prior to sale in order to allow the flavours to harmonize.

Diageo operates an innovation centre called Yenilikhane in Alaşehir, which houses two 500-litre copper stills used for developing new rakı formulas. As of 2025, nearly 200 formulas had been developed at the facility, with three craft products launched to market. These craft rakıs hold the distinction of being the first in the category of anise-flavoured beverages worldwide.

== Serving and drinking ==
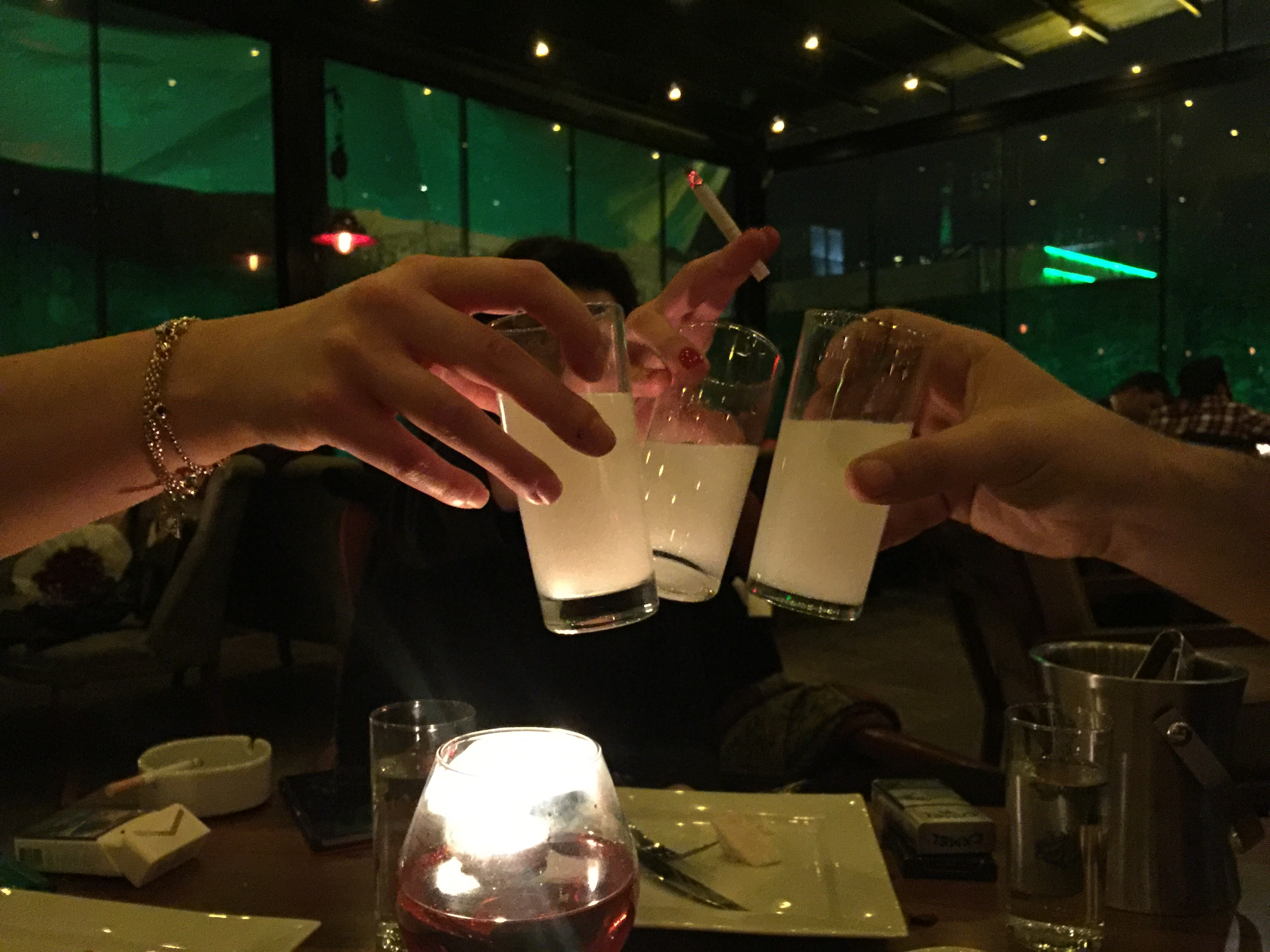
Toasting with rakı, in typical rakı glasses

In Turkey, rakı is the national alcoholic drink, it is traditionally consumed with chilled water on the side or partly mixed with chilled water, according to personal preference. Rakı is rarely consumed without the addition of water. Ice cubes are often added. Dilution with water causes rakı to turn a milky-white colour, similar to the louche of absinthe. This phenomenon has resulted in the drink being popularly referred to aslan sütü ('lion's milk'). Since aslan ('lion') is a Turkish colloquial metaphor for a strong, courageous person, this gives the term a meaning close to 'the milk for the strong'.

Rakı is commonly consumed at a rakı sofrası ('rakı table') or çilingir sofrası ('locksmith's table') alongside meze, a selection of hot and cold appetizers, as well as grilled fish. It can be served as dinner, or a late-night meal often shared with friends. It is especially popular with grilled or oven-cooked seafood, olive oil dishes (particularly borlotti beans with tomato sauce), roasted summer vegetables, haydari (garlic-yogurt dip), traditional Turkish delicacies (such as lakerda and midye dolma), together with fresh arugula, beyaz peynir and sweet melon. It is also a popular complement to various red meat dishes like kebabs, where it is sometimes served with a glass of şalgam (pickle juice made from the brine of fermented purple carrots and other root vegetables, often spicy).

When making a toast, it is traditionally said that the bottoms of rakı glasses should be used to toast rather than the rims, as a way of showing mutual respect. After the toast, it is also common to tap the bottom of the glass on the table in remembrance of someone who is not present there.

The founder and first President of the Republic of Turkey, Mustafa Kemal Atatürk, was very fond of rakı and his late-night rakı sofrası sessions were his favourite place to debate issues with his closest friends and advisors.

== Types and brands ==
Standard rakı is a grape product, though it may be produced from figs as well. Rakı produced from figs, particularly popular in the southern provinces of Turkey, is called incir boğması, incir rakısı ("fig rakı"), or in Arabic, tini. Tekel ceased producing fig rakı in 1947.

There are two methods of Turkish rakı production. One method uses raisins and other grapes. Yeni Rakı is produced from raisins and Tekirdağ Rakısı is produced from grapes. Fresh grape rakı is like ouzo but has a higher alcohol content.

Suma rakı, i.e. distilled rakı prior to the addition of aniseed, is generally produced from raisins but raki factories around established wine-producing areas like Tekirdağ, Nevşehir, and İzmir may also use fresh grapes for higher quality. Recently, yaş üzüm rakısı ("fresh-grape raki") has become more popular in Turkey. The maker of a recent brand, Efe Rakı, was the first company to produce raki exclusively of fresh grape suma, called Efe Yaş Üzüm Rakısı (Efe Fresh Grape Raki). Tekirdağ Altın Seri (Tekirdağ Golden Series) followed the trend and many others have been produced by other companies.

The best-known and popular brands of rakı, however, remain Yeni Rakı, originally produced by Tekel, which transferred production rights to Mey Alkol upon the 2004 privatization of Tekel, and Tekirdağ Rakısı from the region of Tekirdağ, which is famous for its characteristic flavour, believed to be due to the artesian waters of Çorlu used in its production. Yeni Rakı has an alcohol content of 45% and 1.5 grams of aniseed per liter; Tekirdağ Rakısı is 45% ABV and has 1.7 grams of aniseed per liter. There are also two top-quality brands called Kulüp Rakısı and Altınbaş, each with 50% ABV. The former one was the favorite of the Iraqi regent Abdul Ilah.

As of 2025, the major producers of rakı include Diageo (makers of Yeni Rakı, Tekirdağ Rakısı, Kulüp Rakı, Altınbaş, İzmir Rakısı, and others), Efe, Burgaz, and Tariş.

Dip rakısı ("bottom rakı") is the rakı that remains in the bottom of the tanks during production. Bottom rakı is thought to best capture the dense aroma and flavour of the spirit, and is also called özel rakı ("special raki"). It is not generally available commercially; instead, rakı factories reserve it as a prestigious gift for large clients.

== Events ==
=== World Rakı Festival ===
Aniseed-flavoured Rakı, has been celebrated as a festival in Adana and Northern Cyprus since 2010. World Rakı Festival in Adana, emerged from a hundred-year tradition of enjoying Adana kebab, with liver, şalgam and rakı. The event turned into a nationwide popular street festival, street musicians playing drums and zurna, entertain visitors all night long at the second Saturday night of every December. In 2015, following pressure from Islamist media and the Adana Governor, the festival was officially renamed the "Adana Kebap and Şalgam Festival", though it continued to be popularly known as the Rakı Festival.

=== World Rakı Week ===
Since 2023, Yeni Rakı has organized World Rakı Week, an annual international celebration of Turkish rakı culture held across major cities in Europe and beyond. The 2024 edition took place from 29 November to 8 December across London, Berlin, Hamburg, Amsterdam, Paris, Vienna, and Dubai, featuring pop-up experience centres called "The House of Yeni Rakı", rakı masterclasses, mezze tastings, live music performances, and cocktail events. The 2025 edition expanded further, with events held from 27 November to 7 December in cities including Barcelona for the first time.

== Other uses ==
In Crete tsikoudia is a pomace brandy that is sometimes called rakı but made from grapes. It is used to make rakomelo, which is flavored with honey and cinnamon and is served warm during winter months.

== See also ==
- Anise-flavored liqueurs
- Arak, a similar drink from the Levant and Iraq
- Culture of Turkey
- Ouzo, Greek aniseed flavoured drink
- Ouzo effect, the science behind the milky appearance
- Pastis, French anise-flavoured spirit
- Rakia, a fruit brandy popular in the Balkans
- Sambuca, an Italian aniseed flavoured drink
- Tsikoudia, the Cretan-Greek distilled drink
- Tsipouro, Greek distilled drink
- Turkish cuisine
- Turkish wine
- Vodka, a Polish-Russian clear distilled drink
- Zivania, the ouzo/tsipouro of Cyprus
