= World Rakı Festival =

- Observed by: Adana, Turkey
- Type: Local
- Celebrations: Food, music, folkloric dancing
- Date: 2nd Saturday night of December
- 2024 date: December 14
- 2025 date: December 13
- 2026 date: December 12
- 2027 date: December 11
- Duration: 1 night
- Frequency: annual

World Rakı Festival (Turkish: Dünya Rakı Festivali), is an overnight street festival in Adana that emerged from a hundred year long entertainment in the Kazancılar Bazaar where kebab, liver and rakı are accompanied with the street music and dances.

Rakı Festival is held every year on the second Saturday night of December. The dinner tables are placed on more than 10 streets around Büyüksaat. Besides the kebab restaurants of the area, kebap and liver vendors settle on the streets and serve food. Street musicians, playing drums and zurna visit the tables and entertain visitors. Night long music, dancing, eating and drinking ends with the sunrise on Sunday.

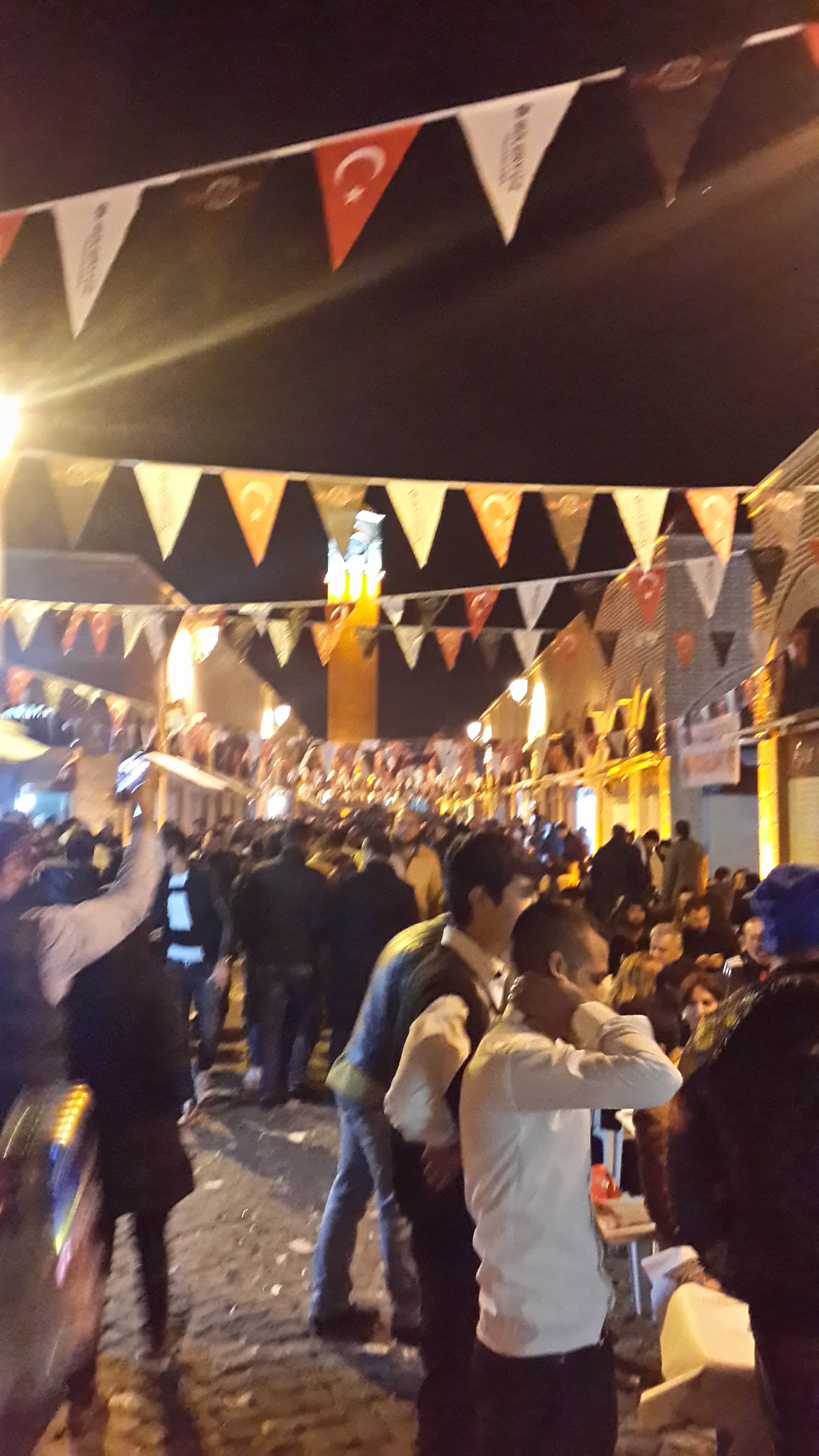
Festival in 2015

The Islamist media targeted and took hardline on the festival in 2015, months before taking place. At an interview with the Adana Governor of the national government, the Governor stated that he would not permit the festival where rakı is consumed at the streets. To avoid the ban, the festival organisers renamed the festival as Adana Kebap and Şalgam Festival, though the festival of 2015 just as it had in previous years and the festival continued to be called the Rakı Festival by public.

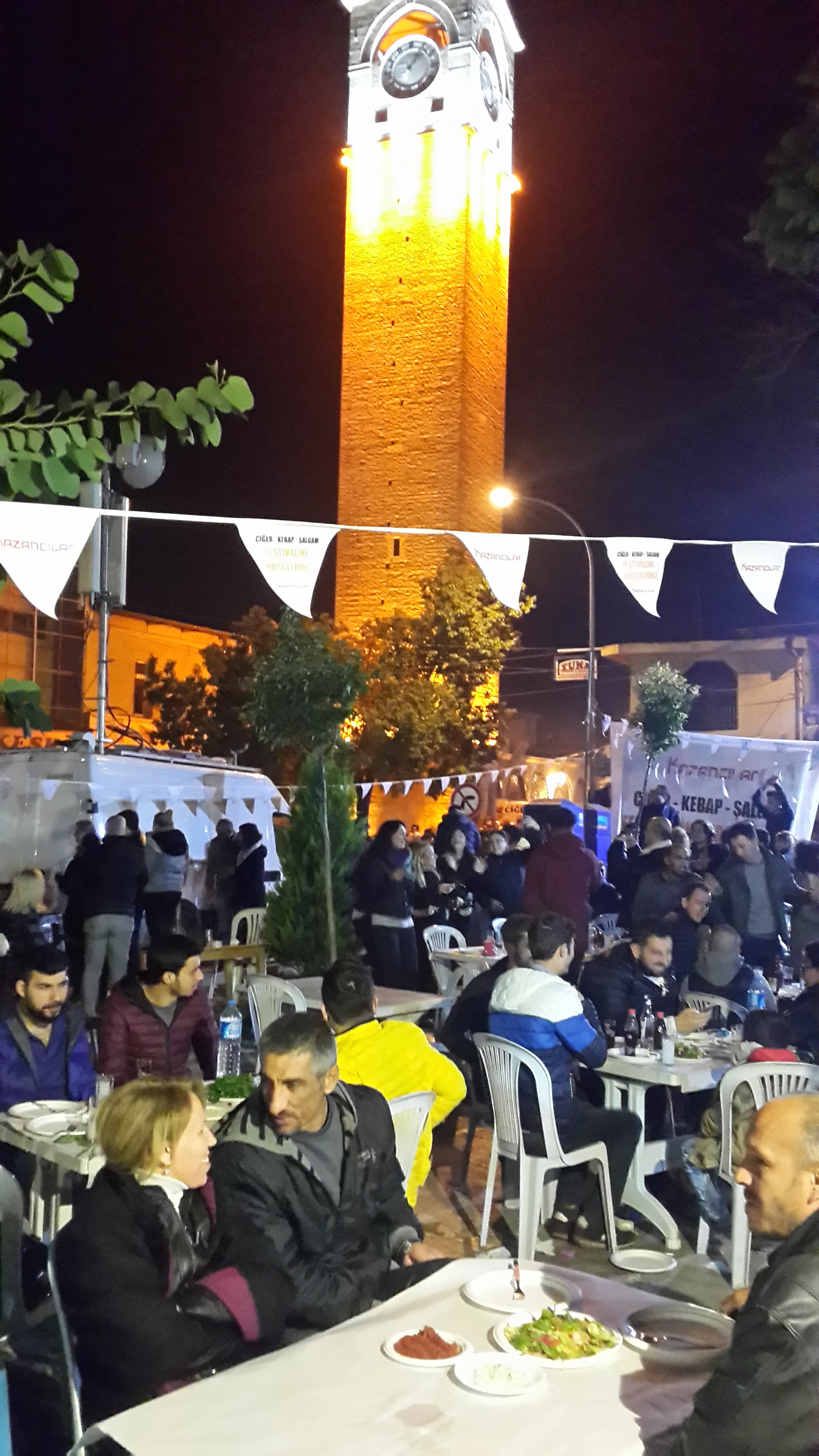
Dining during the festival

== History ==
The visitors of the live bird market that used to set up very early on Sundays at the Kazancılar area, had liver kebab breakfasts here together with the men that get out from the pavyon (English: night club). Thus, Kazancılar became the core of the kebab and liver dining culture in Adana for more than hundred years. Besides serving kebab to the businesses in the old town during the days, the kebab restaurants of Kazancılar are open late every night for food and entertainment and are frequented by Adana locals. Saturday overnight entertainment is accompanied by the liver breakfast tradition, that starts around 5am on Sunday lasting until noon. Şalgam, a spicy and refreshing beverage made from fermented purple carrots, was a popular drink among this crowd, as it has a reputation of curing hangovers. In 2010, a group of frequenters of Kazancılar designated the second Saturday of December as the World Rakı Day, to celebrate the popular national alcoholic beverage that combines well with kebab and şalgam. People initiated World Rakı Day was first celebrated on December 10, 2011. As years pass, the rakı celebration took attention not only from Adana locals, but by the kebab and rakı lovers from the Çukurova region and from all over Turkey. In year 2014, the festival is visited by more than 20 thousand people and took wide coverage on national media.

The festival in 2015, gathered a record of visitors, despite the banning requests by the Islamist media and supporting statements from the Adana Governor. At around 22:00, at the time the people were dining at the tables on the streets, a group of four Islamist attacked the festival with a pump rifle, gun, sticks and döner knife. After shooting twice to the air, the group attack the tables with sticks and döner knife, chanting anti-alcohol slogans. After a short chase, the civil police caught all the attackers and took them to the police station. The attack did not cause any injury or death and the entertainment continued afterwards until the early morning.
