= Kabab koobideh =

Iranian grilled minced meat dish

Kabāb koobideh
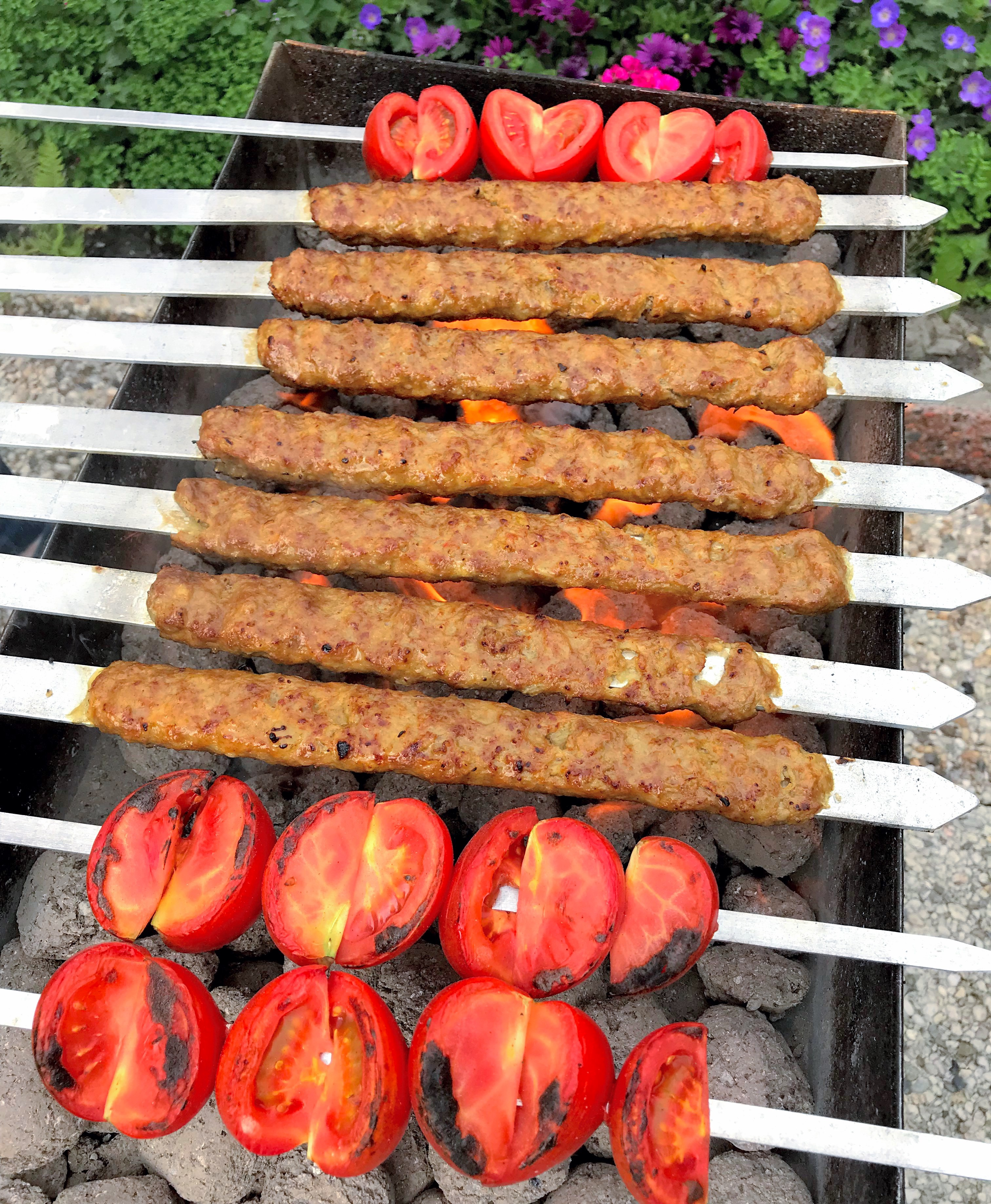
- Kabāb koobideh being grilled over hot coals alongside tomatoes
- Alternative names: Koobideh, Kubideh, Kobida
- Place of origin: Iran
- Region or state: Golpayegan, Tehran and Bonab
- Associated cuisine: Iranian cuisine
- Created by: Iranians
- Main ingredients: Ground lamb or beef

Kabāb koobideh (Persian: کباب کوبیده [kʰæˌbɒːb‿e‿kʰuːbiːˈd̪e]) is an Iranian kabāb made from ground lamb, often mixed with salt, ground black pepper and grated onions.

== Etymology ==
Koobideh is derived from the past participle of the Persian infinitive koobidan (کوبیدن), meaning "to pound," which refers to the traditional method of preparing the meat. In some regions, the dish is also known as "koufteh kabāb," originating from the older Persian root kouftan, meaning "to slam" or "to hit." Traditionally, the meat was placed on a flat stone or log and pounded with a wooden mallet to achieve the desired texture. The meat is then cooked on a seekh (سیخ), the Persian word for "skewer." Koobideh is based on the Indian seekh kebab, though there may be regional variations in preparation and flavour.

== Preparation and cooking ==
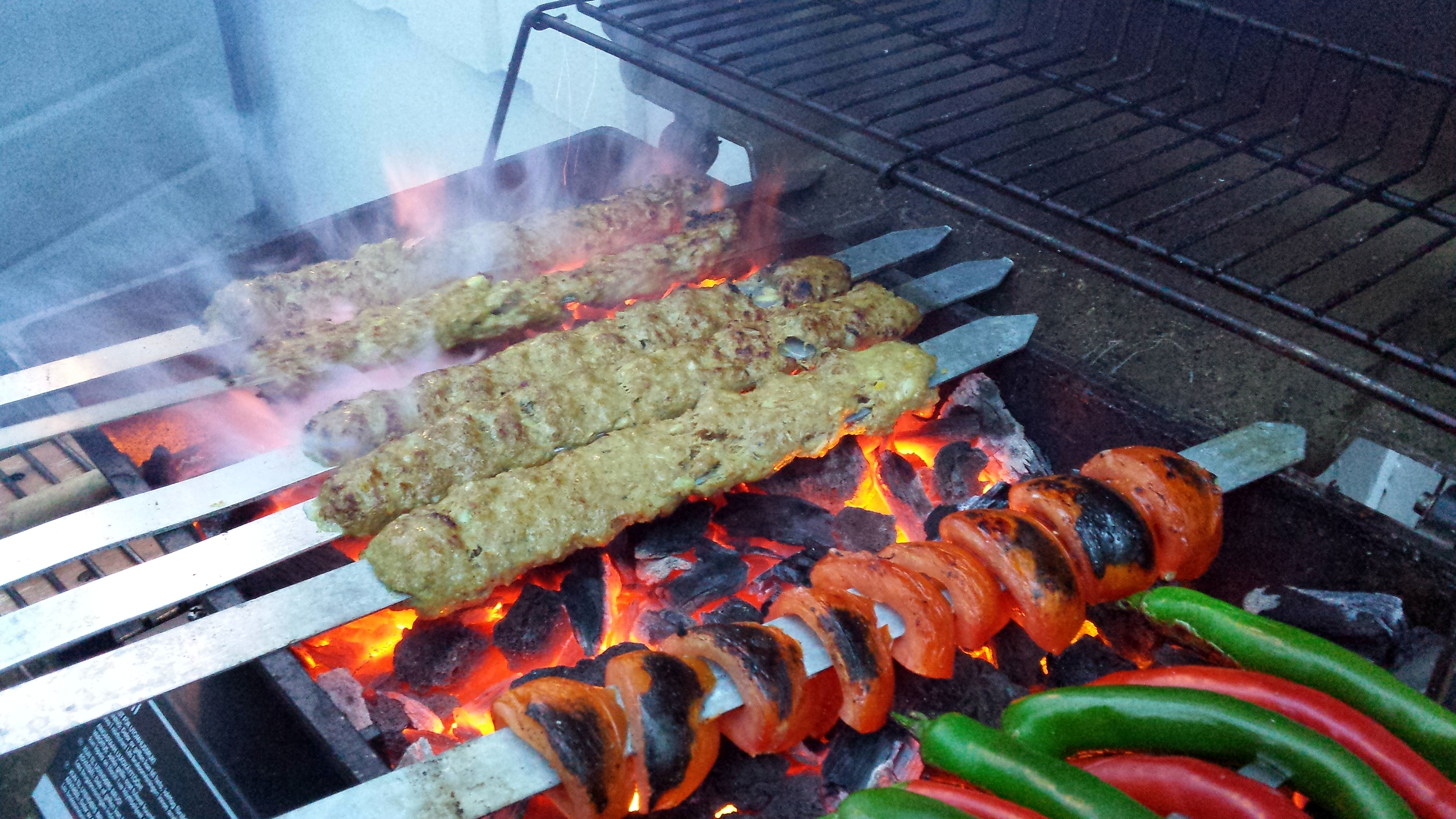

Koobideh Kebab is a type of Iranian kebab made from ground meat. According to Daryabandari's esteemed cookbook, there are two main styles of koobideh: a soft, tender type served with Iranian flatbreads like sangak and lavash, and a firmer but juicier type served with rice. Both styles use the same ingredients, with differences in how the meat is processed.

For authentic koobideh, the meat is typically selected from fattier, more economical cuts of young male lamb, such as the lower rib, breast-cut, and flank. For a more premium and refined kebab, other cuts like the rack, loin, and shoulders may be used. The meat is usually ground twice using medium-grade grinding plates. Ideally, the fat content should be between 20 and 35%, although professional cooks may use up to 40%. Unlike similar kebabs, such as Adana or kofta, tail fat is rarely used in koobideh due to its stronger flavour. Instead, flank or rib section fat is preferred for its milder taste.

Grated onion is the second essential ingredient. The onions are finely grated, salted, and rested for a few hours to soften their pungency. Afterwards, excess moisture—up to 65% of the onion's total weight—is squeezed out. In typical recipes, onion accounts for 15–18% of the total mixture (with an onion-to-meat ratio between 180 and 220 grams per kilogram). Using more onion can make the kebab juicier and softer but increases the risk of disintegration during grilling.

The key ingredients for koobideh are limited to meat, white or yellow onion, salt, and black pepper. Any additional ingredients, such as beef, veal, old or female mutton, chicken, eggs, baking soda, bread crumbs, flour, or other spices, are considered deviations from the traditional recipe. These additions are often used to simplify processing or to compensate for lower-quality meat, but they are viewed as less authentic.

Kneading the meat mixture is crucial for achieving the kebab's desired texture. For the softer version, kneading is done at higher temperatures (up to 50 °C). This allows the fat to render and integrate into the muscle tissues, resulting in a homogeneous, soft, but less juicy texture that "melts" in the mouth. However, this method is less common today due to the risk of microbial contamination from warm-temperature processing. The firmer version is kneaded at cold temperatures while the meat is semi-frozen, keeping the fat and meat particles separate. In this situation during grilling, the fat particles renders locally and forms pockets of juice within the softer, interconnected meat structure, making the kebab juicier.

After kneading, the meat is spread onto wide flat skewers (2–4 cm), with each portion ranging from 80 to 400 grams. Special indentations, called gol, are made on the kebab surface to help distribute heat evenly (through the exposed metal sikh) during grilling, resulting in more uniform cooking.

Koobideh requires a higher grilling temperature, compared to other Iranian kebabs, and frequent flipping is essential to avoid uneven cooking, falling down or burning. Early flipping also prevents the meat from shrinking or detaching from the skewer.

Despite its simple composition with limited ingredients, koobideh is often served with a variety of side dishes, including grilled tomatoes, flatbread or steamed rice, raw onions, fresh herbs (especially basil), sumac, butter, and lime or bitter orange.

== Gallery ==
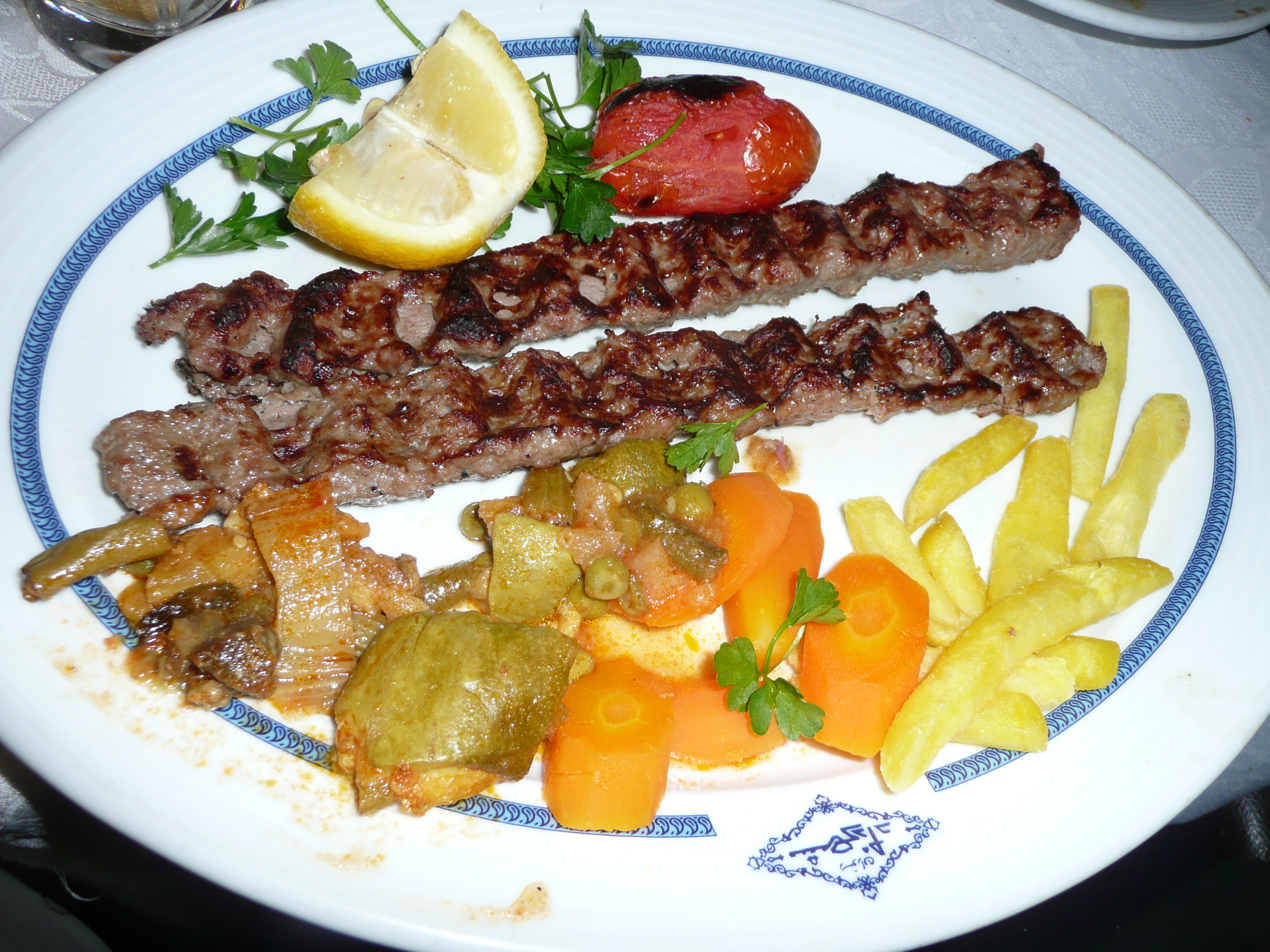
Kabāb koobideh dish in Isfahan

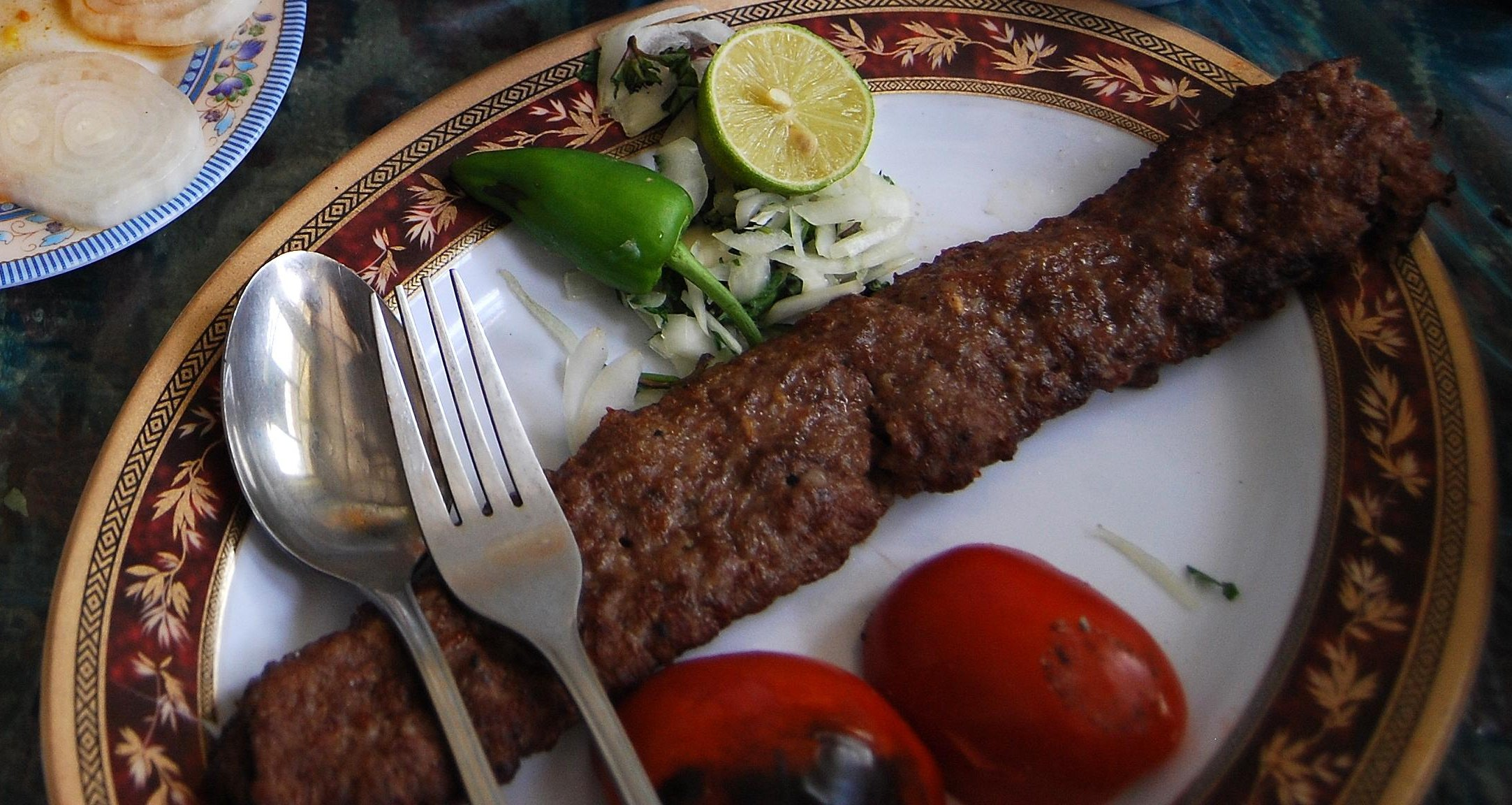
Kabāb koobideh, Bonabi style

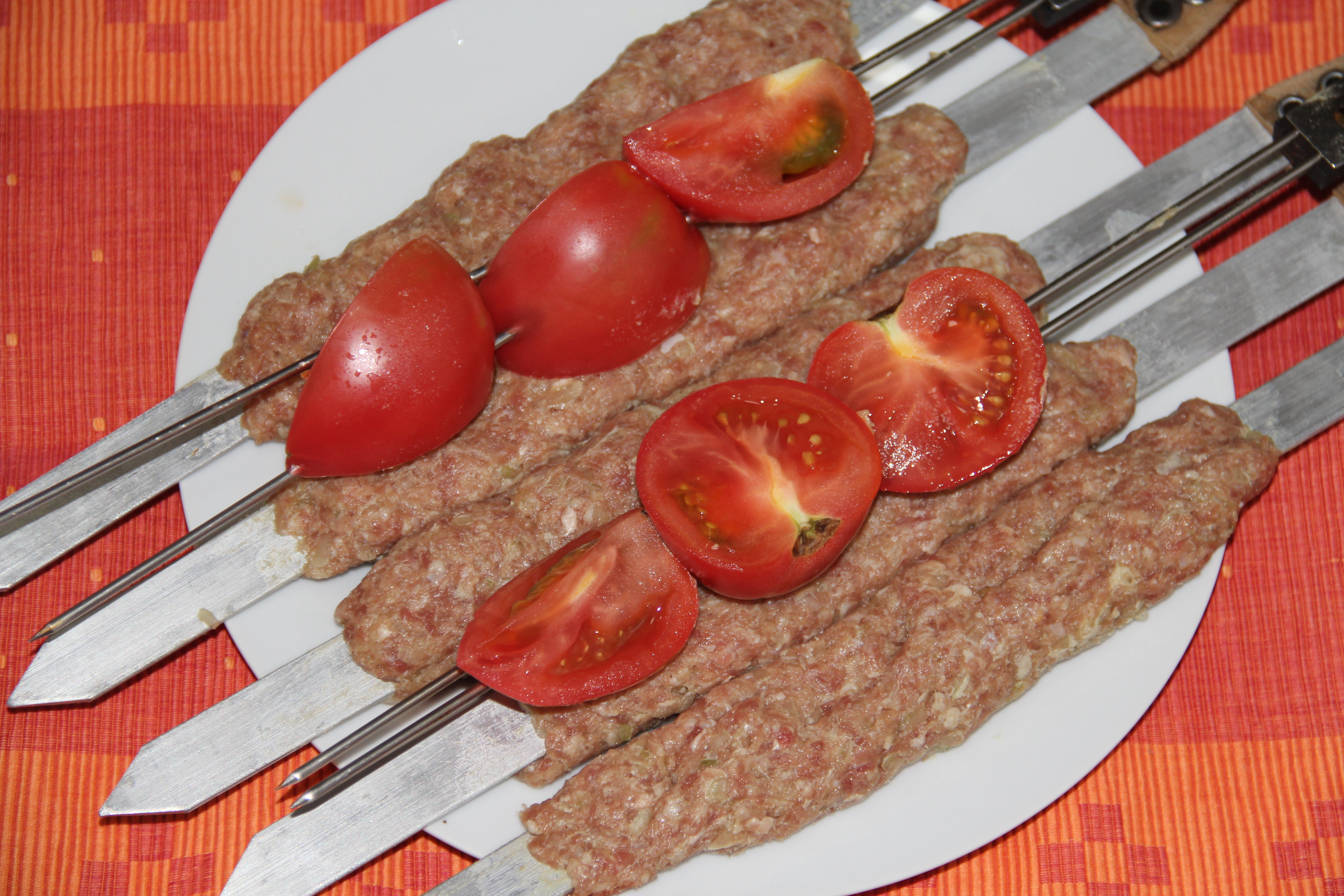
Raw home-made kabāb koobideh (not cooked yet)

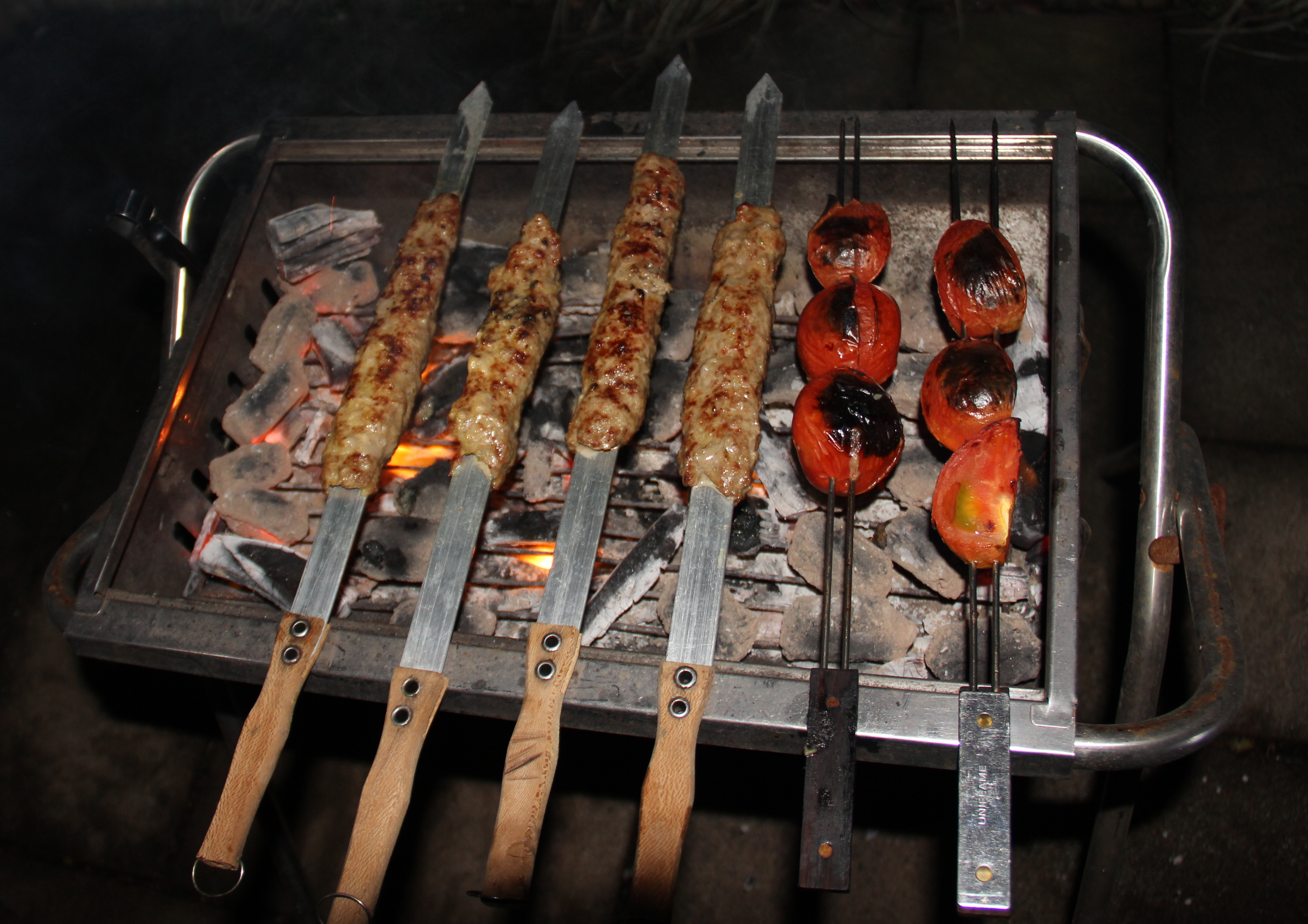
Kabāb koobideh and tomato grilling over barbecue grill

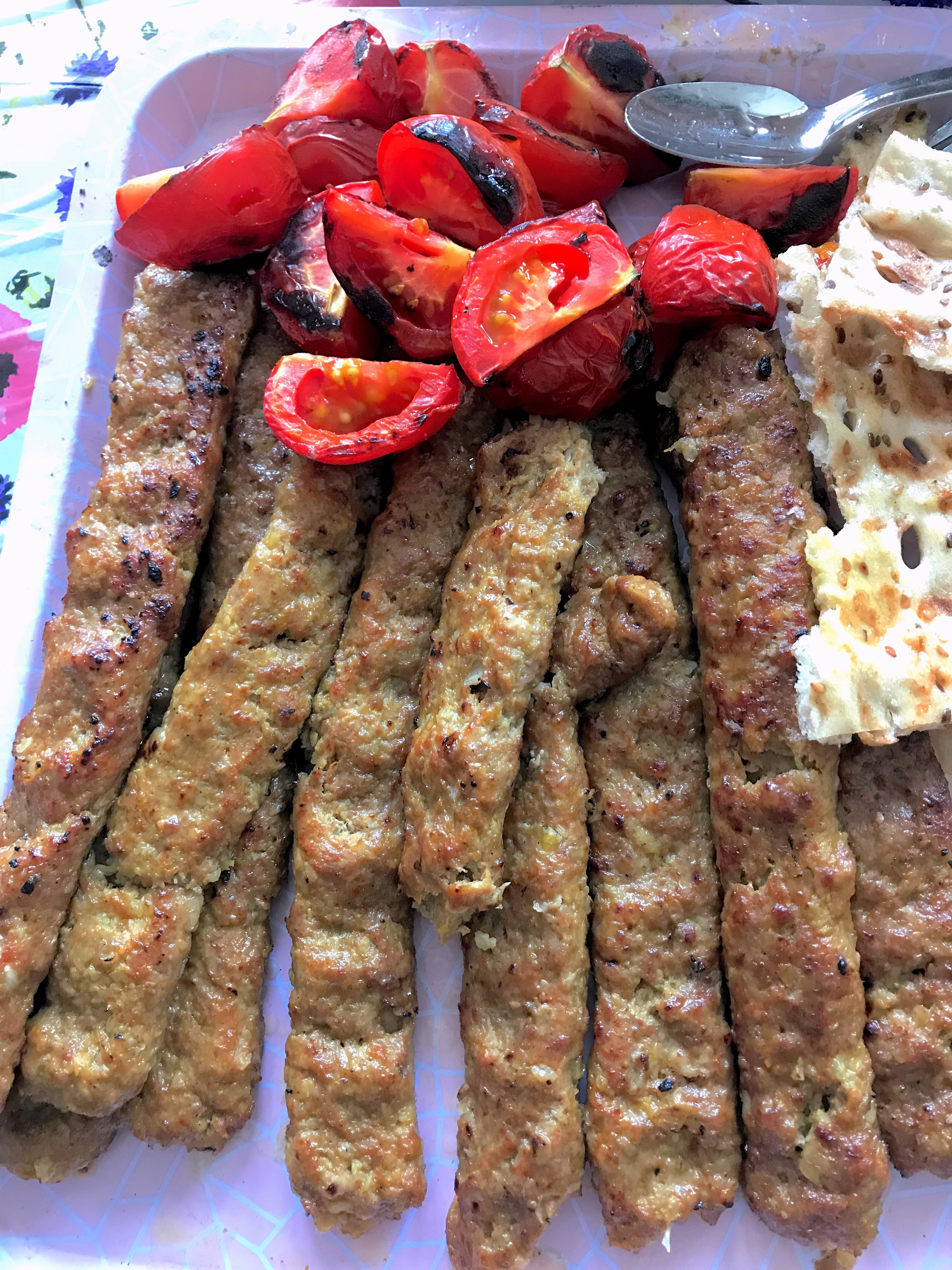
A tray of kabāb koobideh

== See also ==
- Adana kebabı
- Ćevapi
- Chelow kabāb
- Kabāb barg
- Kebab
- Kofta
- List of kebabs
- Lula kebab
- Şiş köfte
