= Kirkor Bezdikyan =

Ottoman politician

Mayor of Adana
- In office 1877–1879
- Preceded by: Gözlüklü Süleyman Efendi
- Succeeded by: Sinyor Artin

Adana Deputy for Ottoman Parliament
- In office 18 March 1877 – 28 June 1877
- Preceded by: new position
- Succeeded by: position abolished

Personal details
- Occupation: Architect

Kirkor Bezdikyan, also known as Krikor Agha Bzdikian or Kirkor Bezdikian, was the second mayor of Adana, Cilicia who was in office from 1877 to 1879, during the Ottoman Empire.

== Life ==
He was credited with starting the first modern municipal governance at the time city was flourishing in the cotton trade, hence many Ottoman and European businesses and officials were moving to the city. Before being a mayor, he was elected to the Ottoman Chamber of Deputies at the first democratic election held on 18 March 1877. He was one of the three deputies of Adana Vilayet, and the only one to represent the non-Muslims of the province. Short-lived first parliament was dissolved on 28 June 1877 and the non-Muslim representation for the province was abolished for the second election.

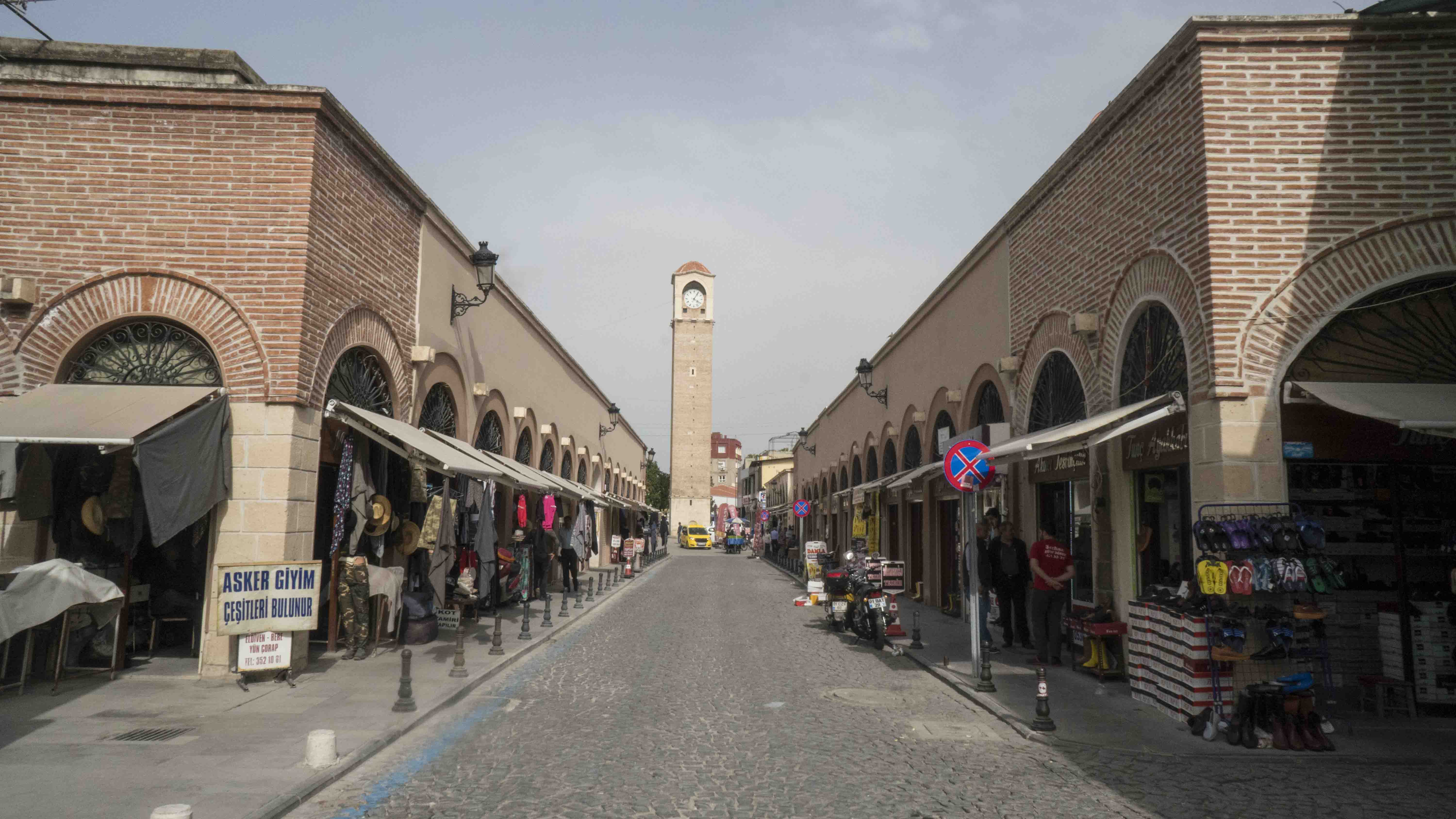
The clock tower built by Bezdikyan is still the main symbol of the city.

During Bezdikian's mayoralty in Adana, the roads were widened and paved with cobblestone, drainage canals and trenches were opened, more importantly the first municipal regulations were put in effect. He designed and constructed the first clock tower of the city, Büyük Saat. Bezdikyan, successor Sinyor Artin and Mangoyan were the three ethnic Armenian mayors of Adana in the late 19th century.

Kirkor was the member of the wealthy Bezdikyan family, who had a 100-hectare farm in İncirlik. He had one house in Hıdır İlyas, one house in Sarı Yakub, one house and two shops in Faki Durmuş neighborhoods in the city. Law of Abandoned Properties that enacted by the Turkish government on 15 April 1923, confiscated all his family property and distributed them to the immigrants and exchanged populations that arrived from Balkans and Crete.

Political offices
Preceded by Gözlüklü Süleyman Efendi	Mayor of Adana; 1877-1879	Succeeded by Sinyor Artin
