= Büyük Saat =

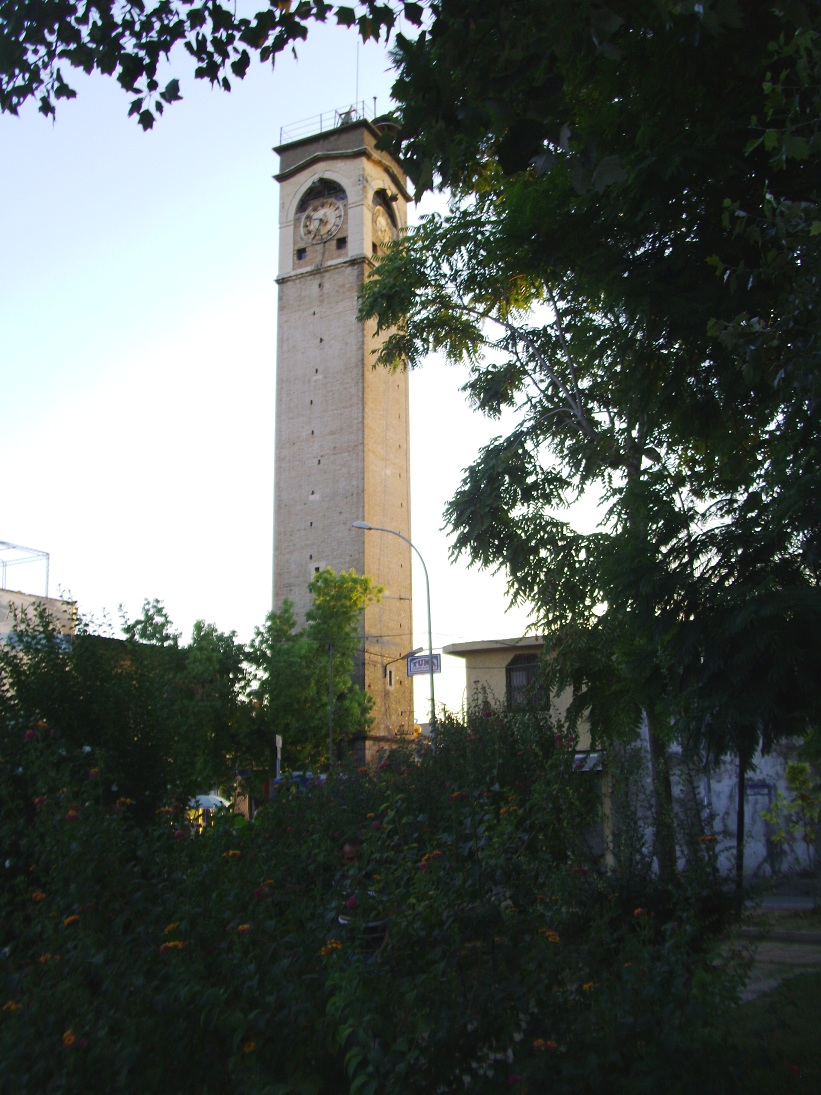

General information
- Type: Clock tower
- Architectural style: Ottoman Neo-baroque
- Location: Adana, Turkey, Alimünif Caddesi
- Coordinates: 36°59′02″N 35°19′49″E
- Construction started: 1879
- Completed: 1882
- Renovated: 1935

Height
- Height: 32 m (105 ft)

Design and construction
- Architects: Kirkor Bezdikyan, Kasbar Agha Bezdikyan

Büyük Saat (English: The Great Clock Tower) is a historical clock tower in Adana, rising 32 m (105 ft) high. The tower symbolizes the modernization of the city, which lasted from 1863 to the Adana massacre. During this period many Ottoman and European businesses moved to the city for the exploding cotton trade. The tower was constructed by the mayor Kirkor Bezdikyan on the main street (Roland street, now known as Ali Münif) who was credit for starting the first modern municipal governance. Bezdikyan was also the architect of the tower together with another Armenian architect Kasbar Agha Bezdikyan.

== History ==
The construction of Büyük Saat was started in 1879 by the mayor Kirkor Bezdikyan. Besides the architect mayor, another Armenian architect, Kasbar Agha Bzdikian, was also responsible for its design. It was completed by the mayor Mangoyan in 1882, as a symbol of modernization. Mayor Hacı Yunus also made a significant contribution to the construction. It has since stood as one of the major landmarks of the city.

== Architecture ==
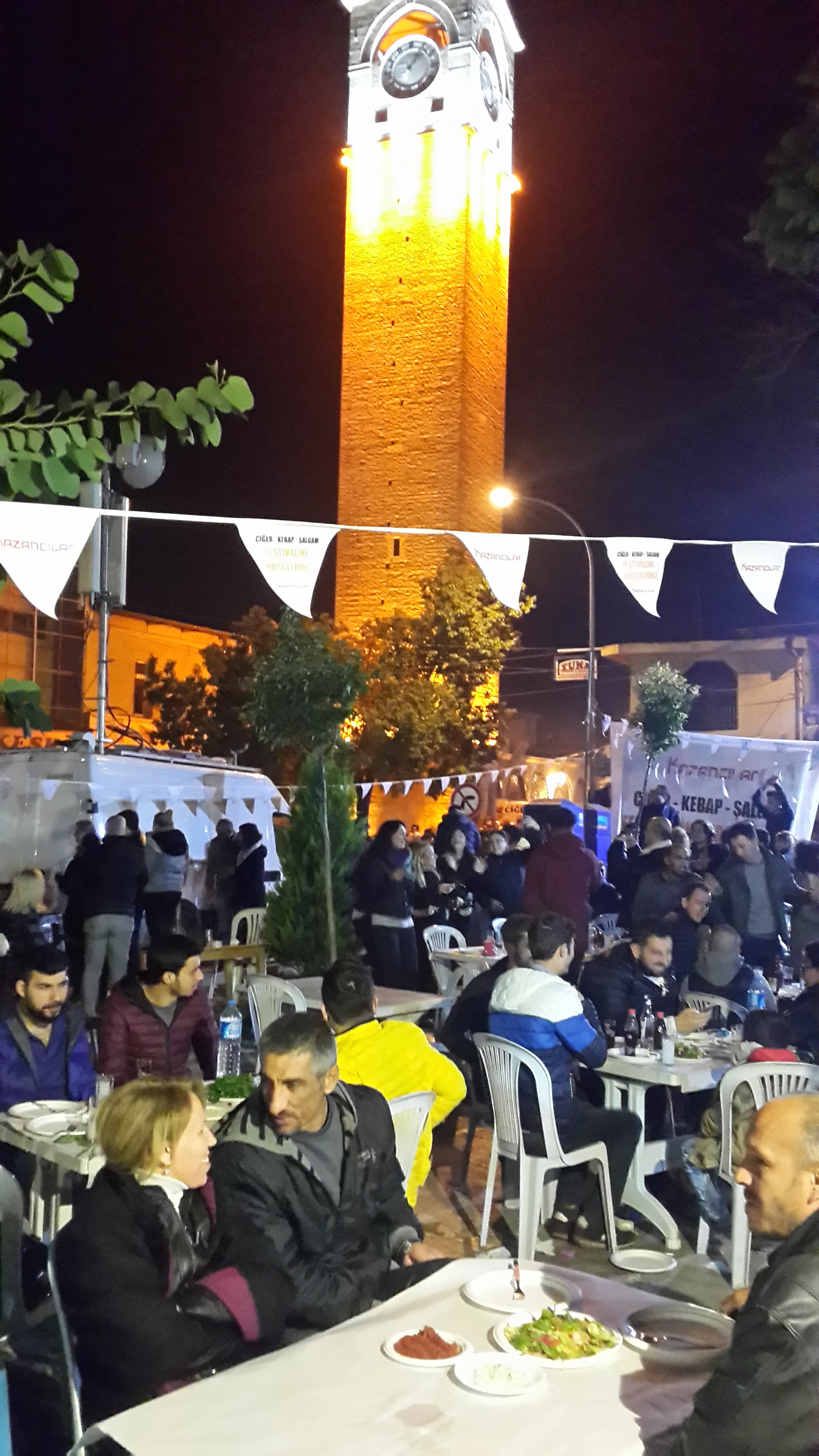
World Rakı Festival at Büyüksaat

Büyük Saat was constructed as a square prism, and its tower walls were built with bricks. The tower has a height of 32 m (105 ft), but the depth of the foundations is thought to be even deeper, at 35 m (115 ft). There were rumors that the water that springs from the foundations had healing powers.

During the period of its construction, similar clock towers were also built in the other large cities of the Ottoman Empire. Büyük Saat was the highest of them all, the second-highest being the Dolmabahçe Clock Tower in Istanbul.

== Function ==
The construction of the Büyük Saat made the residents' life easier by improving their timekeeping. Every hour, the loud bell of the tower, which could be heard from most sections of the city, would ring. After the construction of the tower, the city's officials arranged their office hours according to the time given by Büyük Saat. The times for Islamic prayer, previously defined by the position of the sun, were also now set by Büyük Saat.

The major issue with Büyük Saat today is the lack of pedestrian areas at its base. The tower is in the middle of a busy street which makes visitor access difficult. The Adana Metropolitan Municipality have plans to widen sidewalks of Ali Münif Caddesi and re-route some of the local traffic to another street to improve the situation.

== See also ==
- Ottoman architecture
