= Adana kebabı =

Turkish grilled ground meat on a skewer

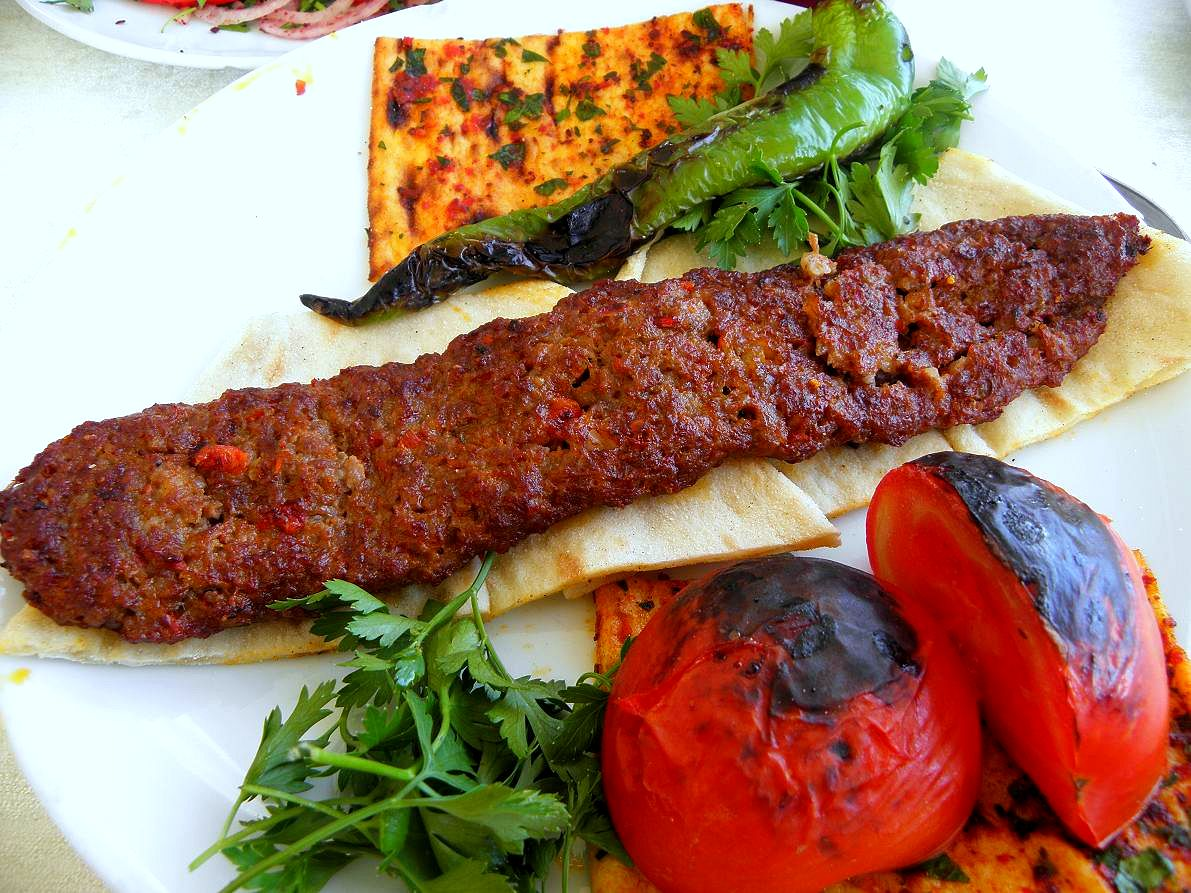
- Adana kebabı in its hometown, comprising only male lamb meat, red bell peppers and tail fat hand minced together. Served with charred peppers and tomatoes, an onion-sumac-parsley salad, and lavaş.
- Alternative names: Acılı kıyma kebabı
- Course: Main dish, with salad (onion, leaves and spice)
- Place of origin: Turkey
- Region or state: Adana-Mersin
- Created by: Unknown
- Serving temperature: Hot
- Main ingredients: Hand-minced lamb and tail fat

Adana kebap (Turkish: Adana kebabı) or Adana kebab is a dish that consists of a long strip of hand-minced meat, mounted on a wide iron skewer and grilled on an open mangal filled with burning charcoal. The kebab is named after Adana, the fifth-largest city of Turkey, and was originally known as the kıyma kebabı (lit: minced meat kebab) or kıyma in Adana-Mersin and the southeastern provinces of Turkey.

Kebabs are usually made out of ground lamb meat and tail fat, though there are many regional variations. Kebabs are fairly common in the area from Mersin in Turkey to Kirkuk in Iraq, and includes Aleppo in Syria.

== History ==
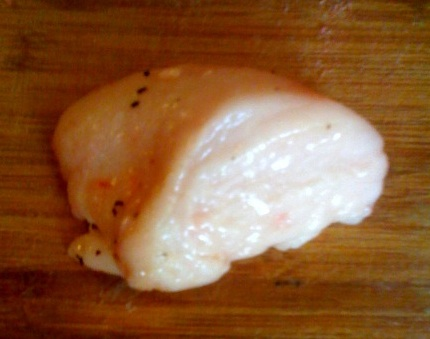
Tail fat, the essential ingredient of any Kıyma kebabı

According to many authors, this kebab was born out of a fusion of Turkish and Arab cultures. Birecik, once an important locality in the Eyalet of Aleppo, is said to be the creator of this very kind of kebab. The version prepared and consumed today in the province of Adana also has a history rooted in the modern Turkish culture, only to receive a "Controlled Designation of Origin" in February 2005, after several legal trials.

== Geographical distribution ==
=== Original geography ===
According to the Patent Registrar, an original Adana kebabı is made only by a vendor who has successfully passed an inspection conducted on the spot by the Adana Chamber of Commerce.

The kıyma kebabı is still prepared in its historical location. Similar dishes are prepared in neighboring zones of Turkey, Syria and Iraq, where the meat is hand-ground with the addition of tail fat and occasionally a non-spicy capsicum. (Note: Please refer to the "Variations" section of the same article for a more extensive list of the original Pan-Aleppan variants.)

=== Recent geography and misconceptions ===
New variants of the kıyma kebabı, not protected under the same patents, have been enjoyed since the 1950s, in communities in the former Ottoman Empire territories, including Istanbul, Baghdad, and Damascus. These versions are adapted to the local tastes and cannot be considered the original kıyma kebabı:

- In Istanbul, and other Turkish communities outside of Adana and Aleppo, a kıyma kebabı is either an Adana kebabı (the spicy variant) or an Urfa kebabı (the non-spicy one). The original Adana kebabı was not spicy at all, and Urfa kebabı did not exist, even in Urfa.

== Preparation ==
=== Mincing and kneading ===
According to the Designation of Origin, Adana kebabı is made from the meat of a male lamb that is younger than one year of age. The animal has to be grown in its natural environment and fed with the local flora.

The meat should then be cleansed of its silverskin, nerves and internal fat. After the cleansing, it should be cut into rough chunks and, along with tail fat at a proportion of one to five, rested for a day.

The next day, the rested meat and fat must be ground by hand, using a crescent-shaped iron cleaver known as the zırh. Only sweet red peppers (also hand-chopped with the zırh) and salt should be added. The Designation of Origin also authorizes, "under certain circumstances", the addition of spicy green capsicum and fresh garlic cloves.

The meat is then thoroughly kneaded together with the fat, the salt and the additional ingredients until reaching a homogenous consistency.

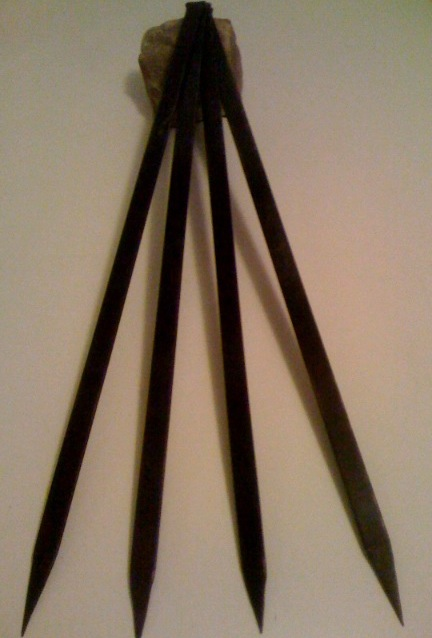
Broad skewers of pure iron, specially crafted for the Adana kebabı

=== Impaling ===
After reaching homogeneity, the mixture is placed on iron skewers that are 0.5 cm thick, 3 cm wide and anywhere from 90 to 120 cm long. One portion of Adana kebabı is typically 180 grams of meat on one skewer. A "portion-and-half", impaled on slightly wider skewers can not include less than 270 grams, as per the designation label.

A little water allows the minced meat to adhere better to the skewer, which is the hardest step in the making of this kebab. If not done properly by an Usta, the meat will separate from the skewer during roasting. The Turkish word "Usta" derives from the Persian "Ostad" (أستاد) originally meaning "Master" but also now a common honorific to show deference to someone's expertise.

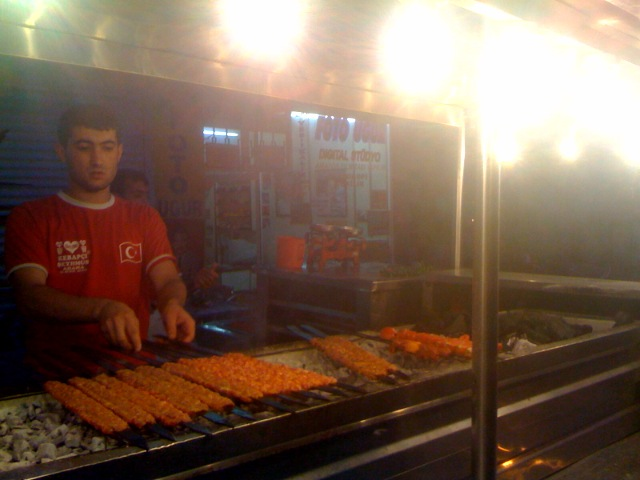
Adana kebabı on the mangal

=== Cooking ===
The impaled skewers are roasted over flame-less coals of oak wood. When the meat turns dark brown, it is ready. The skewers are frequently turned during this process. The melting fat is collected on flatbread by pressing pieces of flatbread against the meat as it roasts; this also serves to heat the bread.

== Serving and eating ==
The kebab is commonly served on a plate, as a porsiyon, or wrapped in flatbread, as a dürüm.

=== Porsiyon ===
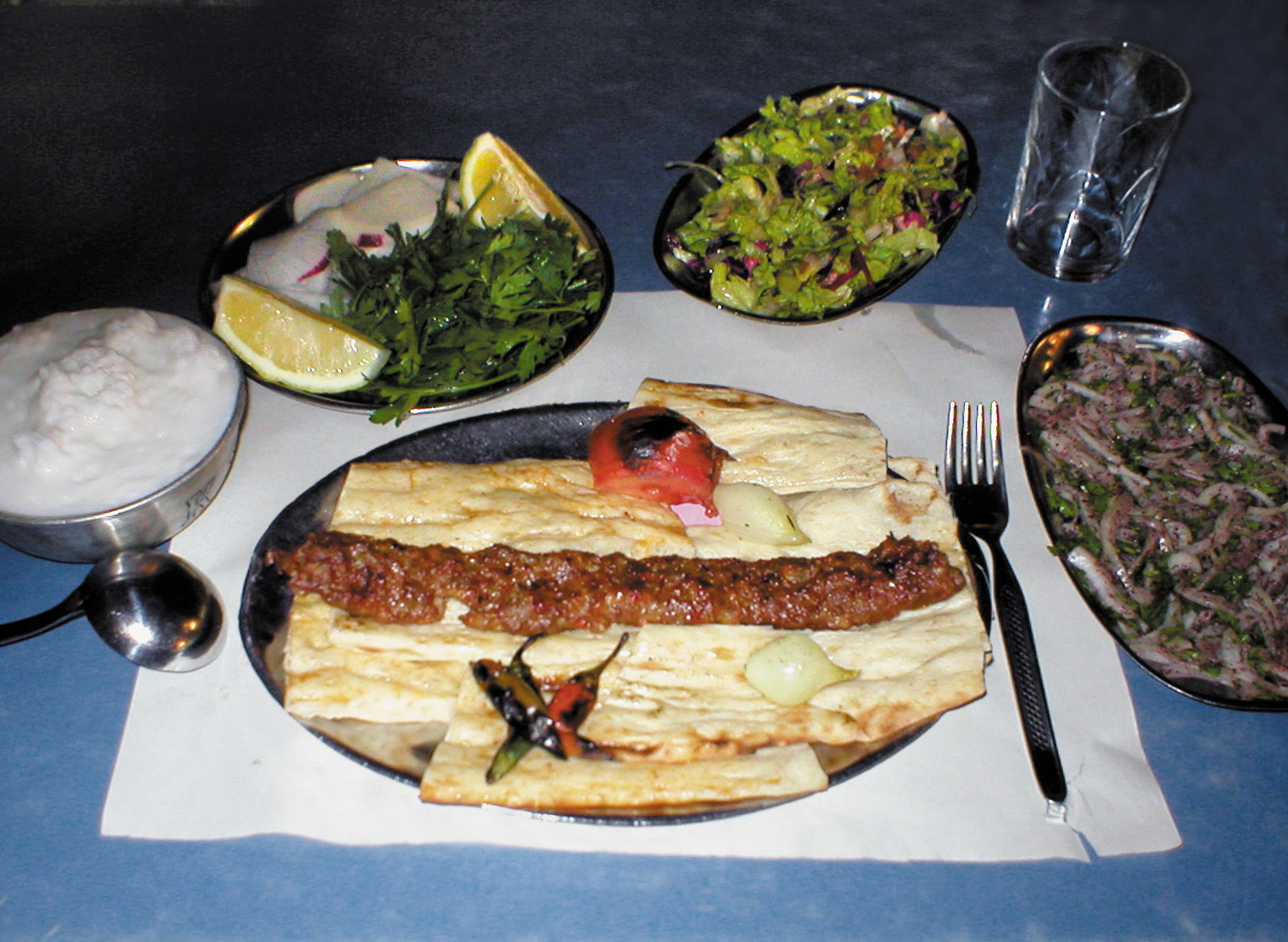
Adana kebabı served as porsiyon with the right accompaniments and ayran

The kebab is served over the flatbread used to catch the drippings. It is accompanied by roasted tomatoes, green or red peppers and julienned onions with parsley and sumac. Other typical mezes in Adana-Mersin served with the kebab include red pepper ezme with pomegranate molasses, fresh mint and tarragon leaves, braised shallot hearts with olive oil and pomegranate molasses, pickled small green chili peppers, and, around Mersin, green shallot stems with slices of bitter orange, citron, lime and lemon. Many restaurants around Adana will also bring hot hummus with butter topped with pastırma on the side.

The way to eat porsiyon is to skin and crush the charred tomatoes and peppers into a paste, put them in a piece of flatbread with part of the kebab, topped by a generous pinch of the onion-sumac-parsley mixture, and wrap the whole thing into a few small thick dürüms.

Ayran and salgam are two staple beverages consumed with kebab in daytime. On hot summer evenings, ice-cold rakı alongside salgam is often preferred.

=== Dürüm ===
The browned kebab is taken out of the mangal, removed from the skewer and placed on top of a large loaf of flatbread (mostly lavaş or tırnak pidesi), topped by a pinch of julienned onions, small diced tomatoes, and some parsley, then sprinkled with a little salt, cumin and sumac and finally wrapped into a long roll. Ayran is more commonly consumed with dürüm compared to the Şalgam.

== Variations ==
Many variations of the kıyma kebabı, all based on hand-chopped lamb meat and tail fat, are found around the Cilician and Mesopotamian parts of the former Ottoman Empire.

Some notable regional examples are:

=== Adana-Mersin ===
- Metrelik kebap: a recent specialty that saw the light thanks to some of most famous ustas (chefs) of Adana. It is nothing but a very long thick Kıyma kebabı that can be 1 to 10 meters, depending on the number of guests on the table. The iron skewers are both long and heavy (some weigh up to 15 kilograms) and specially crafted.
- Beytî: a take on the famous Beyti of Istanbul. Parsley and fresh garlic cloves are chopped alongside the meat and the fat instead of capsicum.
- Kebab Tarsûsî: more common in the eponymous city of Tarsus, this kıyma kebabı includes only minced onion with the meat and the fat.

=== Gaziantep/Aleppo/Şanlıurfa ===
- Haşhaş kebabı or كباب خشخاش: very famous in Nizip, Urfa, Birecik and Aleppo, this is a very simple form of kıyma kebabı, that can at times contain a hint of caul fat and crushed walnuts, making it crispier.
- Simit kebabı (Antep), oruk kebabı (Kilis) or كبّة مشويّة (Halep): is a distant cousin of the kıyma kebabı and includes, per kilogram of meat, one glassful of soaked bulgur, a few shallots, 30 grams of pine nuts and only 100 grams of tail fat. Different herbs and spices such as dried mint flakes, paprika powder, sumac and cumin may be added to the mixture to taste.
- Fıstıklı kebap: a speciality of Antep that has around 150 grams of coarsely ground pistachio kernels per kilogram of meat and fat.
- Sebzeli kebap: another specialty of Antep where red and green peppers as well as onions and parsley are hand-chopped together alongside the meat and the fat.

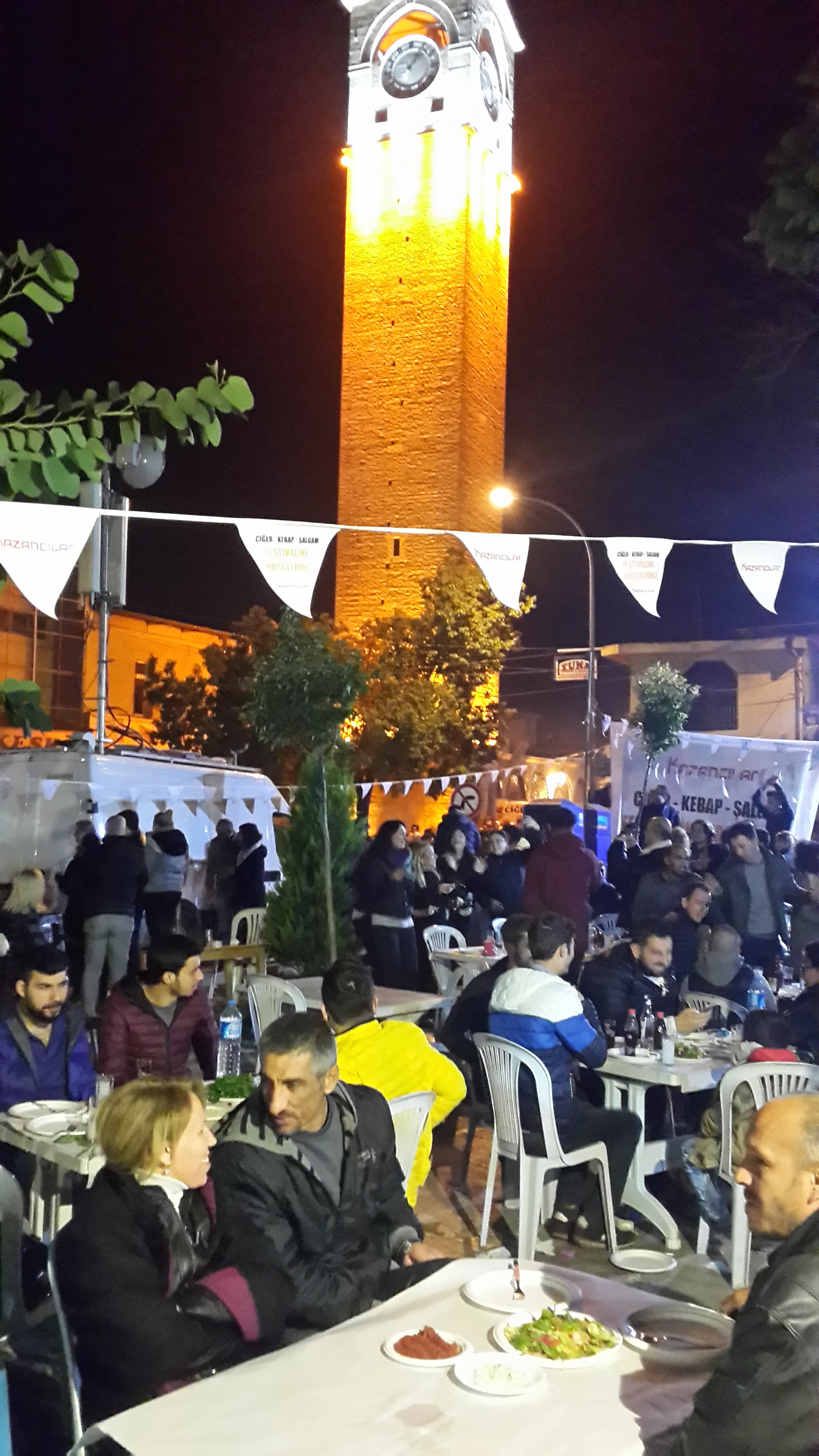
Adana Kebap and Şalgam Festival

- Süleymâniye kebabı or كباب سليمانية: an Iraqi variety, that differs from the classic Adana kebabı in a few ways, notably the fact that no pepper or spice whatsoever is added to the mixture, which is also roasted in a special mangal that has a powerful blower mounted on one side, which raises the temperature of the charcoal. The result is a kıyma kebabı that has a kind of glazed and crispy outer crust. It is named after the city of Sulaymaniyah, Iraqi Kurdistan.

== Events ==
Adana kebab, has been celebrated as a festival in Adana since 2010. Adana Kebab and Şalgam Festival, emerged from a hundred-year tradition of enjoying kebab, with liver, şalgam and rakı. The event turned into a nationwide popular street festival, street musicians playing drums and zurna, entertain visitors all night long at the second Saturday night of every December.

== See also ==
- Kabab koobideh
- Keema
- List of kebabs
- Turkish cuisine
