= Chelow kabab =

Iranian dish

Chelow kebab
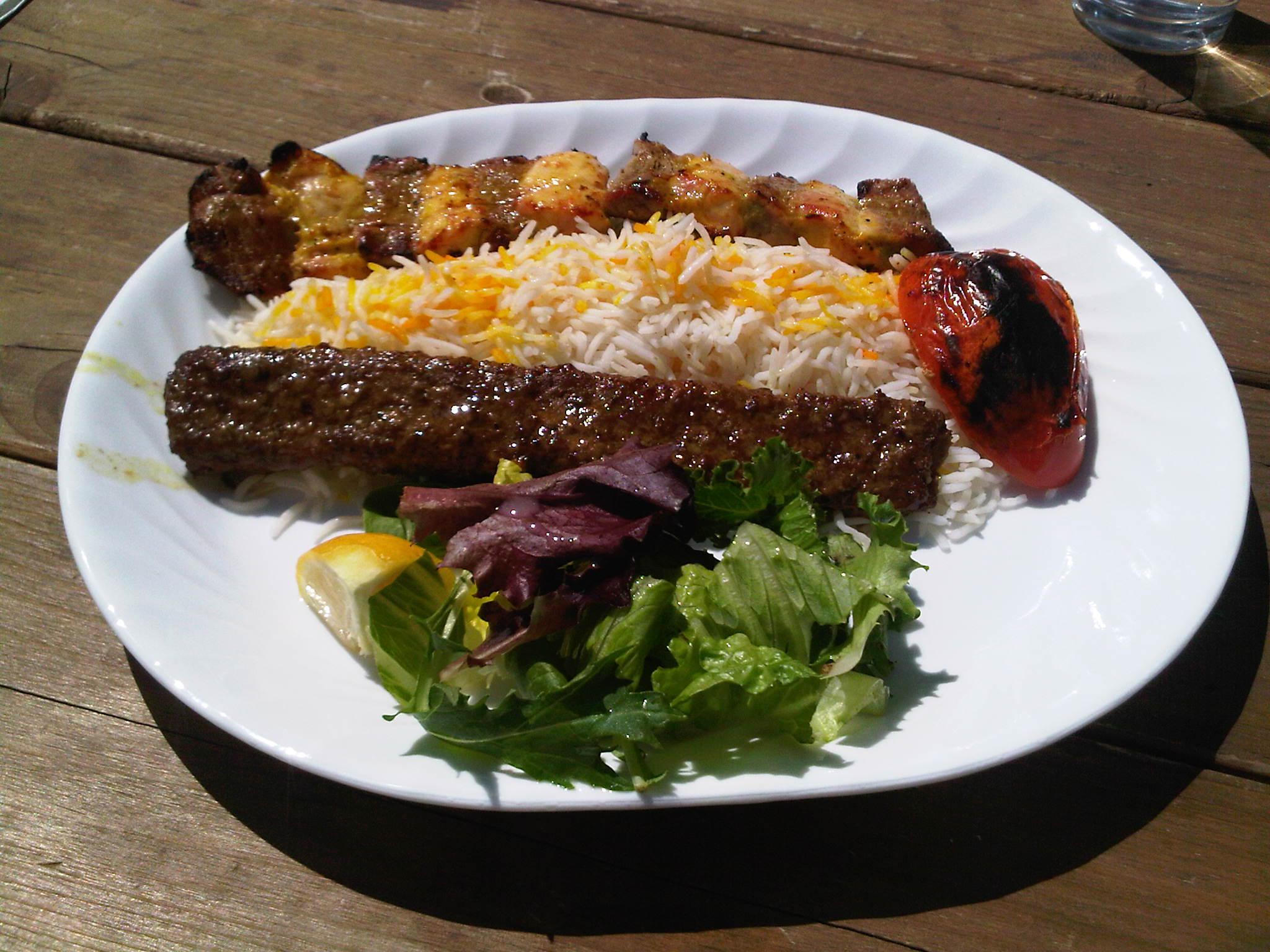
- Chelow kebab Bakhtyari
- Course: Main course
- Place of origin: Iran
- Region or state: Golpayegan and Tehran
- Associated cuisine: Iran
- Created by: Iranians
- Serving temperature: Hot
- Main ingredients: Chelow and kebab

Chelow kebab or chelow kabab (Persian: چلوکباب [t͡ʃʰeˌlow.kʰæˈbɒːb]) is an Iranian dish consisting of steamed rice (chelow) and one of the many varieties of Iranian kebab. It is considered the national dish of Iran, and was probably created during the time of the Qajar dynasty.

Chelow kabab is served with accompaniments such as butter, sumac powder, basil, onions, and grilled tomatoes. The traditional beverage accompanied with chelow kebab is doogh, an Iranian yogurt-based drink, sometimes made of carbonated water.

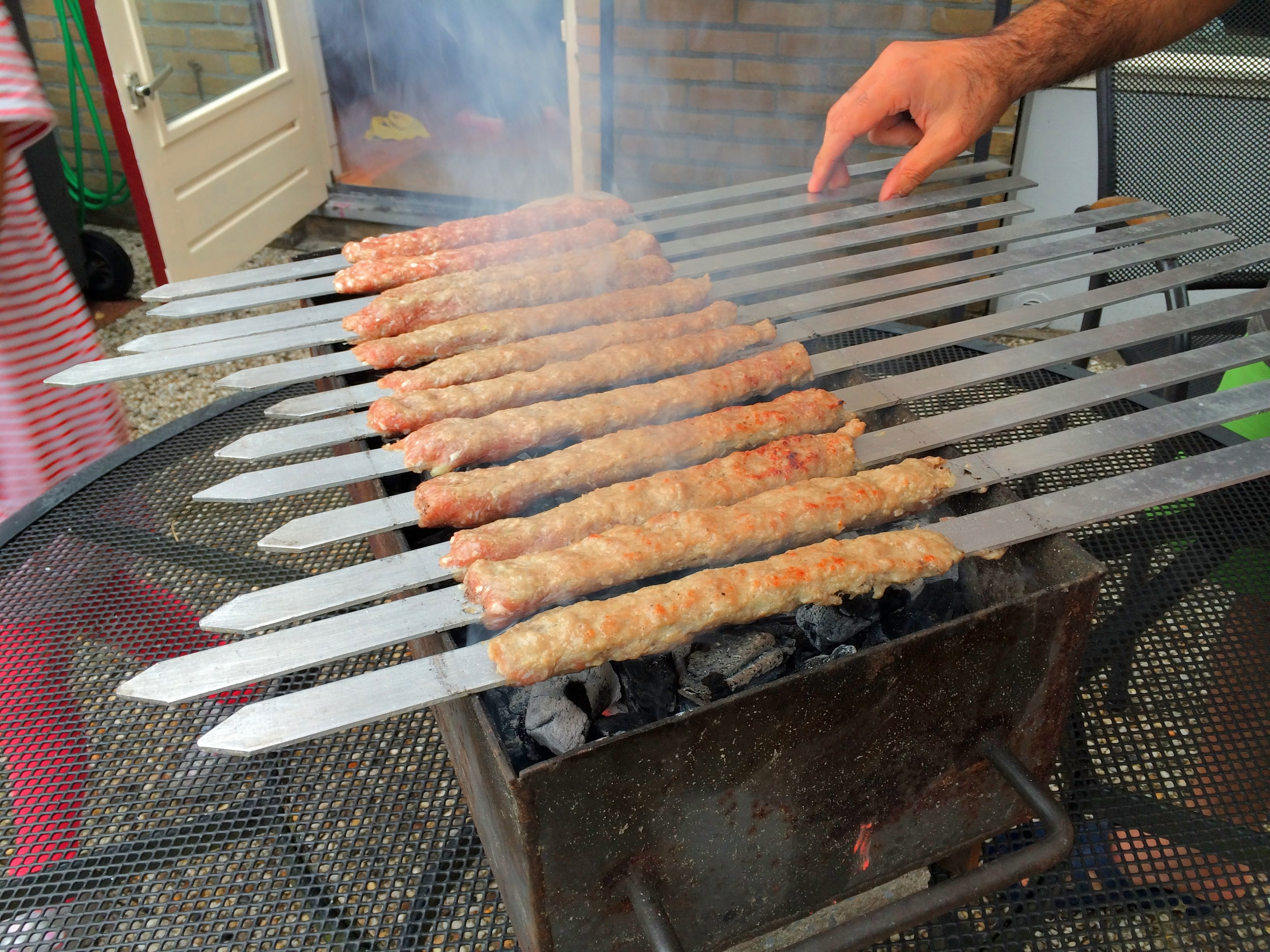
Persian kebab barbequed in Iran

In the old bazaar tradition, the rice and accompaniments are served first, immediately followed by the kababs, which are threaded on skewers, as well as a piece of flat bread (typically lavash). A skewer is placed directly on the rice and while holding the kabab down on the rice with the bread, the skewer is quickly pulled out.

== Varieties ==
- Barg – barbecued and marinated lamb, chicken or beef kabab dish. The most popular form is filet mignon beef.
- Koobideh – is an Iranian minced meat kabab which is made from ground lamb, beef, or chicken, often mixed with parsley and chopped onions.
- Jujeh – grilled chunks of chicken, sometimes with bone, sometimes boneless.
- Soltani – soltānī, meaning "(a meal) in the style of a sultan." Typically it is combo plate of barg and koobideh plus rice.
- Shah abbasi – šāh abbāsī, meaning "(a meal) in the style of a shah." Typically it is combo plate of barg, koobideh and jujeh plus rice.

== Serving traditions ==
The consumption of Chelow kabab in Iranian cuisine is associated with specific traditional rituals and side dishes:

- Social Context: Historically, the meal is regarded as a centerpiece for communal dining, typically served during celebrations, family gatherings, or to honor guests.
- Accompaniments: To balance the protein and fat content of the meat, the dish is characteristically served with:
  - Sabzi Khordan: A platter of fresh herbs (such as mint, basil, and tarragon) and radishes.
  - Doogh: A savory, chilled yogurt-based beverage, often carbonated and seasoned with dried mint.
  - Condiments: Sumac is frequently sprinkled over the rice to provide a tart flavor, often accompanied by a knob of butter and grilled tomatoes.

== See also ==
- Nan-e-kabab
- Pilaf
- Iranian cuisine
