= Kabab barg =

Iranian grilled meat dish

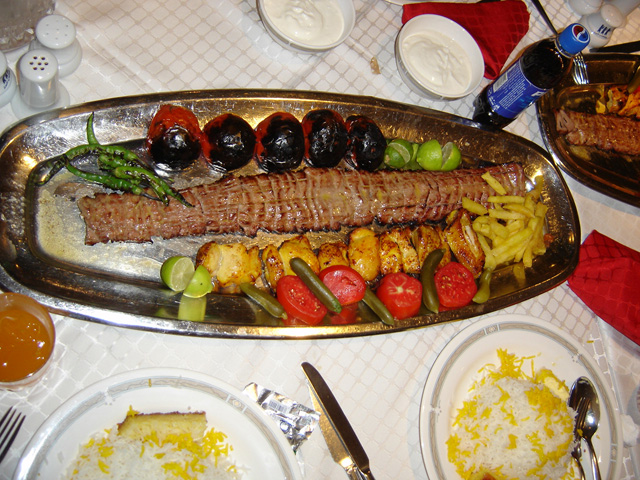
Kabāb-e Barg-e Barre (Lamb), with Jujeh Kabab (Chicken)

Kabāb-e Barg (Persian: کباب برگ, Kabāb-e Barg; lit. 'Leaf Kebab') is a Persian style barbecued and marinated lamb, chicken or beef kabab dish. The main ingredients of Kabab-e Barg are beef tenderloin, lamb sirloin, or less commonly chicken breast, along with onions and olive oil.

Kabab Barg and kabab koobideh are often among the most popular dishes served in Persian cuisine restaurants.

== Preparation ==
The meat is cut in strips and given a marinade in olive oil, onions, garlic, saffron, salt and black pepper. It is then skewered and grilled. Tomatoes are grilled separately and often served on the side with rice or bread, sometimes seasoned with sumac.

At Iranian restaurants, the combination of one Kabab Barg and one Kabab koobideh is typically called soltānī, meaning "(a meal) in the style of a sultan". One Barg, one Koobideh, and one Jujeh is a şāh äbbāsī, meaning "(a meal) in the style of a shah".

== See also ==
- Chelow kabab
- Kabab koobideh
