= Şalgam =

Fermented carrot beverage from Turkey

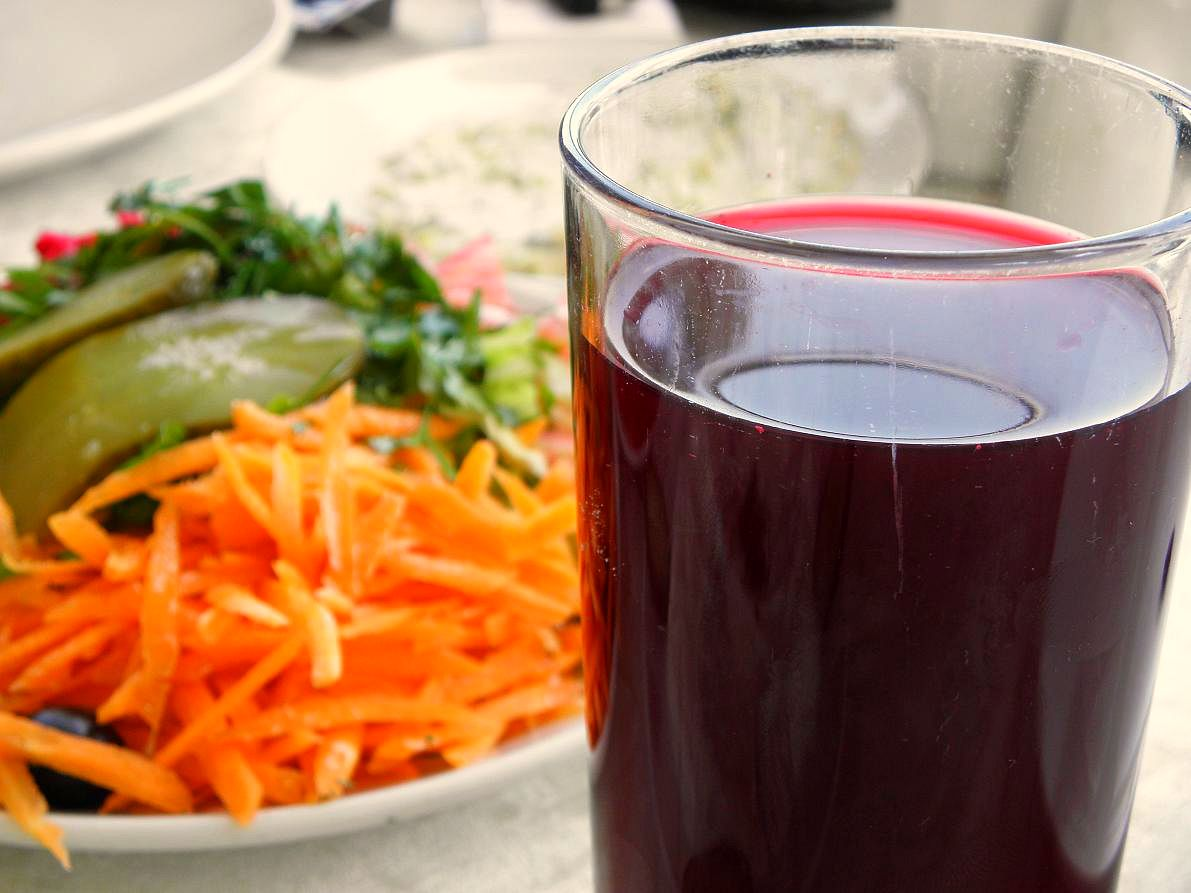
A glass of şalgam

Şalgam or şalgam suyu (Turkish pronunciation: [ʃal̴ˈɡam (suˈju)]; lit. "turnip (juice)"), is a popular Turkish traditional fermented beverage from the southern Turkish cities of Adana, Hatay, Tarsus, Mersin, Kahramanmaras, İzmir and the Çukurova region. French traveler, naturalist, and writer Pierre Belon described its production method in the 16th century. Şalgam is produced by lactic acid fermentation. Studies have shown that the juice of the purple carrot used in şalgam reduces the effects of high-carbohydrate, high-fat diets in rats. It is one of the most popular beverages during winter in Turkey.

A slice of purple carrot, wedges of paprika and/or garlic is often added just before drinking. Alongside ayran, it is typically drunk after eating kebab. Şalgam is often served alongside the alcoholic drink rakı in a separate glass as they complement one another. In some parts of Turkey, ayran and şalgam are mixed.

== Production ==
Although the Turkish word şalgam literally means "turnip", şalgam is made with the sour and salty brine of purple carrot pickles, salted, spiced and flavoured with aromatic turnip (çelem) fermented in barrels with the addition of ground bulgur and rock salt. It is sometimes sold by street vendors who serve it from large goblets, but there are also specialized shops that sell pickles called turşucu that sell non-industrial versions of şalgam. There is no standard production technique used by the industry, but the traditional method uses sourdough fermentation and carrot fermentation. Since 1996 there exist factories for large-scale industrial production of şalgam in Turkey. The biggest producer of şalgam is the company Doganay Gida, whose market share of the annual production is nearly 95%. While the drink is exported to both Europe and Japan, there exists no large-scale importation into America; a company called Ersu tried to sell it as "black miracle drink" but the campaign was eventually cancelled. While the industrial method takes 4–5 days, the traditional method takes 10–12 days. The special taste of şalgam comes from lactic acid and ethanol. The special process is an adaption of yeast fermentation and spontaneous lactic acid fermentation.

== Health benefits ==
While şalgam is commonly recommended as a cure for hangovers, consuming excess amounts may cause bloating, according to some sources. Turkish custom holds that it helps with digestion. It has been reported that the drink has positive health benefits, because its anthocyanin content reduces the risk of disease, notably that of cancer. Its high salt content does, however, mean that it possesses high levels of sodium that some researchers believe could prove dangerous for people with heart disease. It contains β-carotene, group B vitamins, calcium, potassium, and iron and is drunk for its antiseptic effects.

It has been reported that it helps in removing toxins from the body and reducing kidney stones. It is also used to treat pubertal acne, eczema, abscesses, whitlow, and hematomas.

Şalgam is considered a functional food by some researchers since it is a diuretic that also cleans lungs and bronchi.

== Events ==
Şalgam, has been celebrated as a festival in Adana since 2010. The World Rakı Festival (aka Adana Kebap ve Şalgam Festivali), emerged from a hundred-year tradition of enjoying kebabs, with liver, şalgam and rakı. The event turned into a nationwide popular street festival; street musicians playing drums and zurna entertain visitors all night long on the second Saturday night of December.

== See also ==
- Juicing
- List of juices
- Turkish cuisine
- Kanji (drink)
