= Chicken skewers =

Chicken skewers may refer to:

- Dak-kkochi, Korean chicken skewers
- Jūjeh kabāb, Iranian chicken skewers
- Satay, a Southeast Asian dish of grilled meat or vegetables on skewers may be chicken, particularly in Indonesia and Malaysia
- Shish taouk, Middle Eastern chicken skewers
- Yakitori, Japanese chicken skewers
