= Barbecue chicken =

Chicken that is barbecued, grilled or smoked

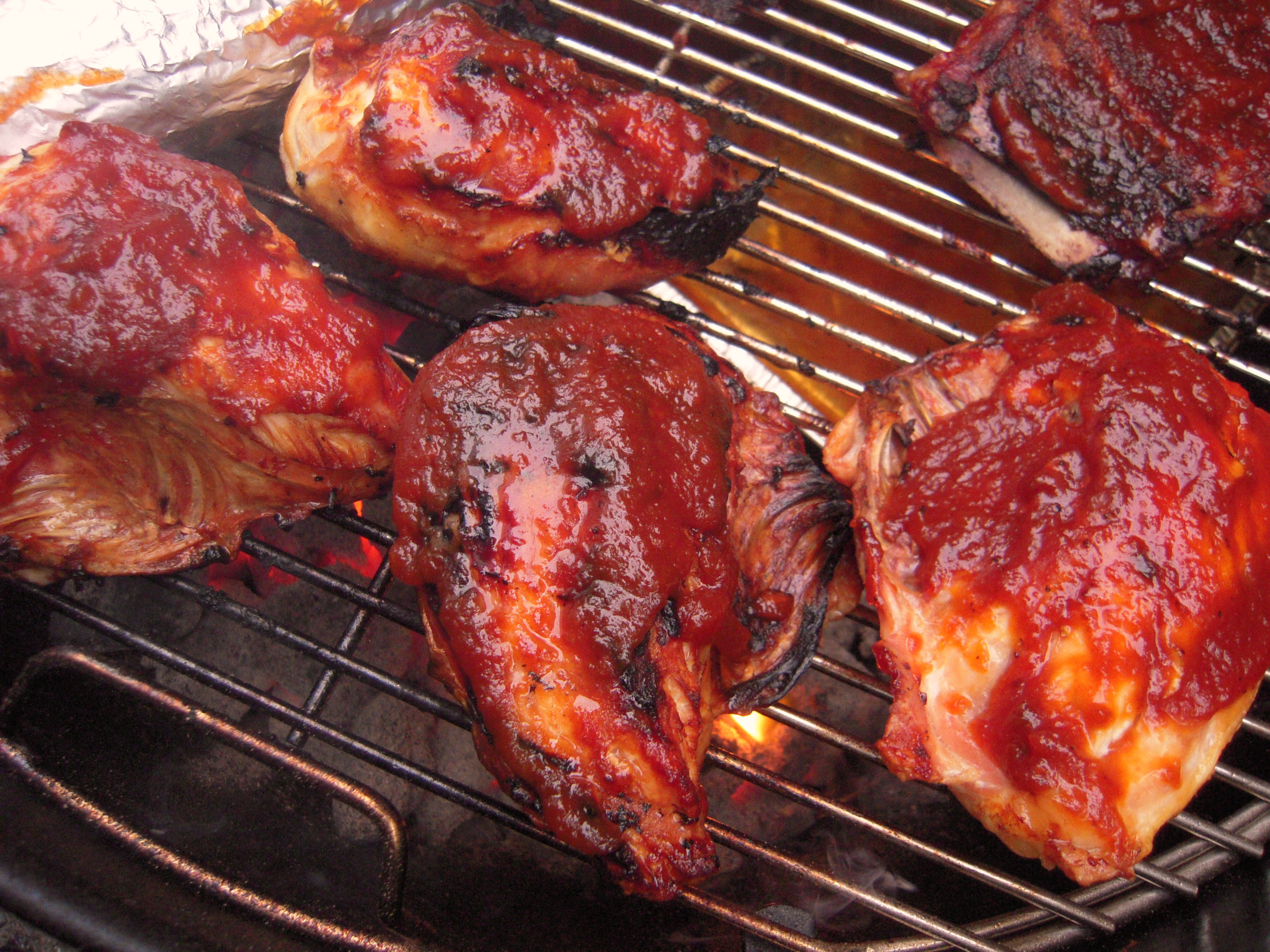
Marinated chicken on a barbecue

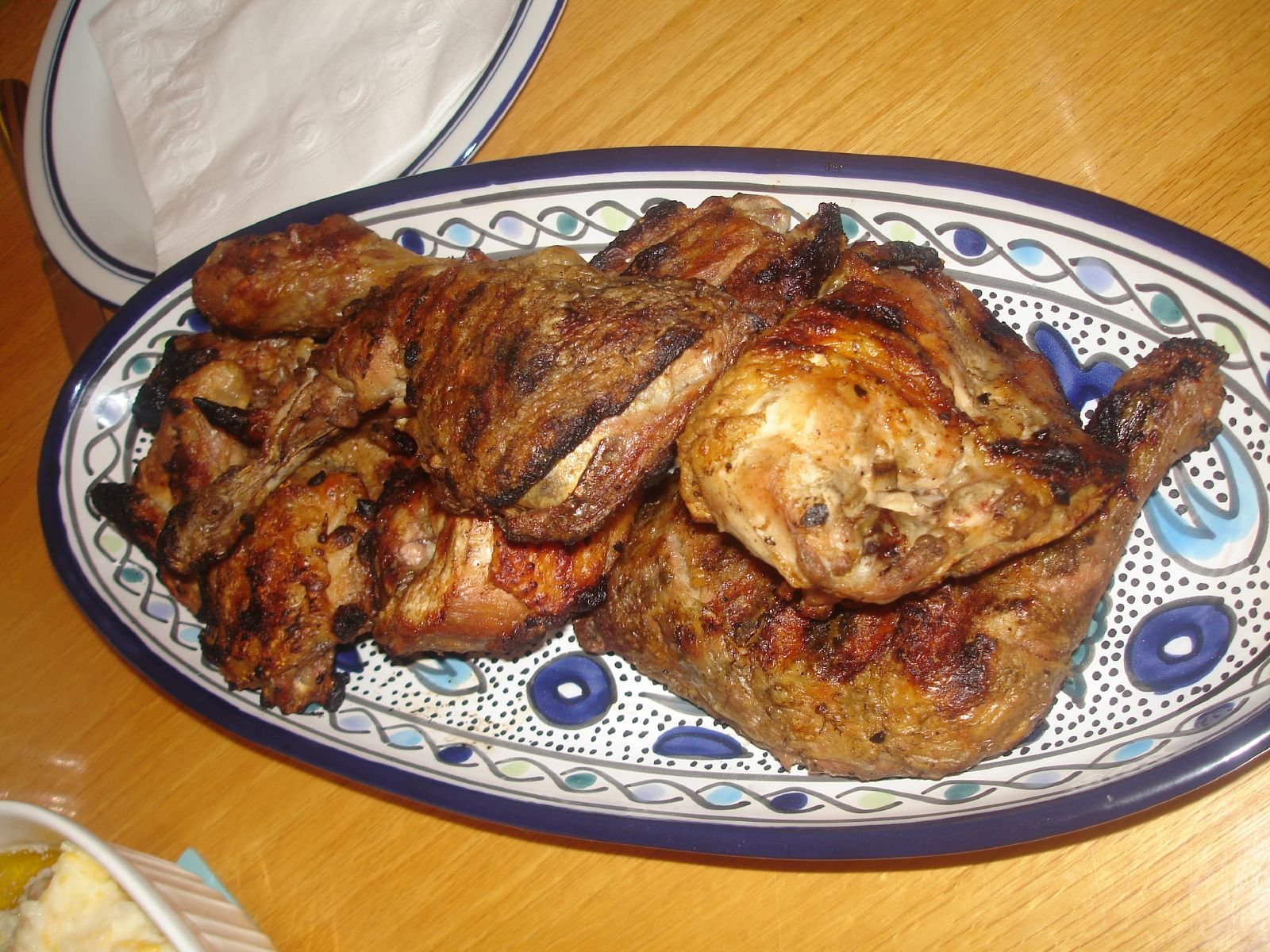
Another barbecued chicken dish

Barbecue chicken consists of chicken parts or entire chickens that are barbecued, grilled or smoked. There are many global and regional preparation techniques and cooking styles. Barbecue chicken is often seasoned or coated in a spice rub, barbecue sauce, or both. Marinades are also used to tenderize the meat and add flavor. Rotisserie chicken has gained prominence and popularity in U.S. grocery markets. Barbecued chicken is one of the world's most popular barbecue dishes.

== Preparation ==
Various techniques exist for cutting poultry for barbecuing, including skewering, butterflying, halving quartering and using individual pieces.

== Regional variations ==
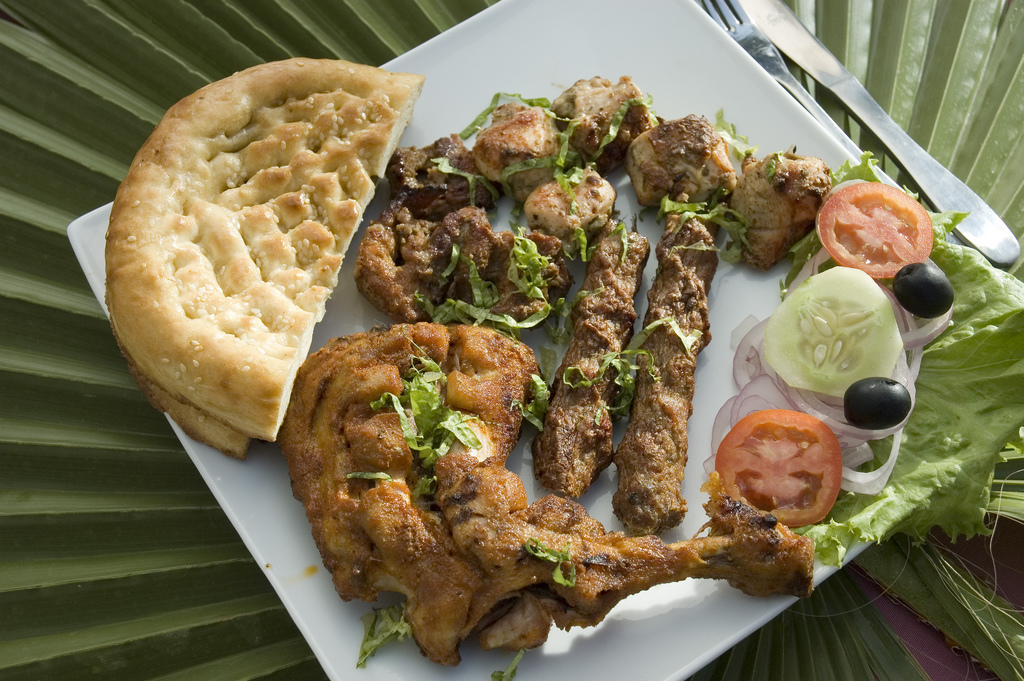
Pukhtún chicken tikka with a variety of other dishes cooked by barbecueing

Regional variations in the preparation of barbecue chicken include culinary variance in preparation, cooking and saucing techniques.

=== Asia ===
In Asia, barbecue chicken is sometimes cubed and marinated in a spiced soy-based sauce, then threaded onto skewers and grilled.

==== India ====
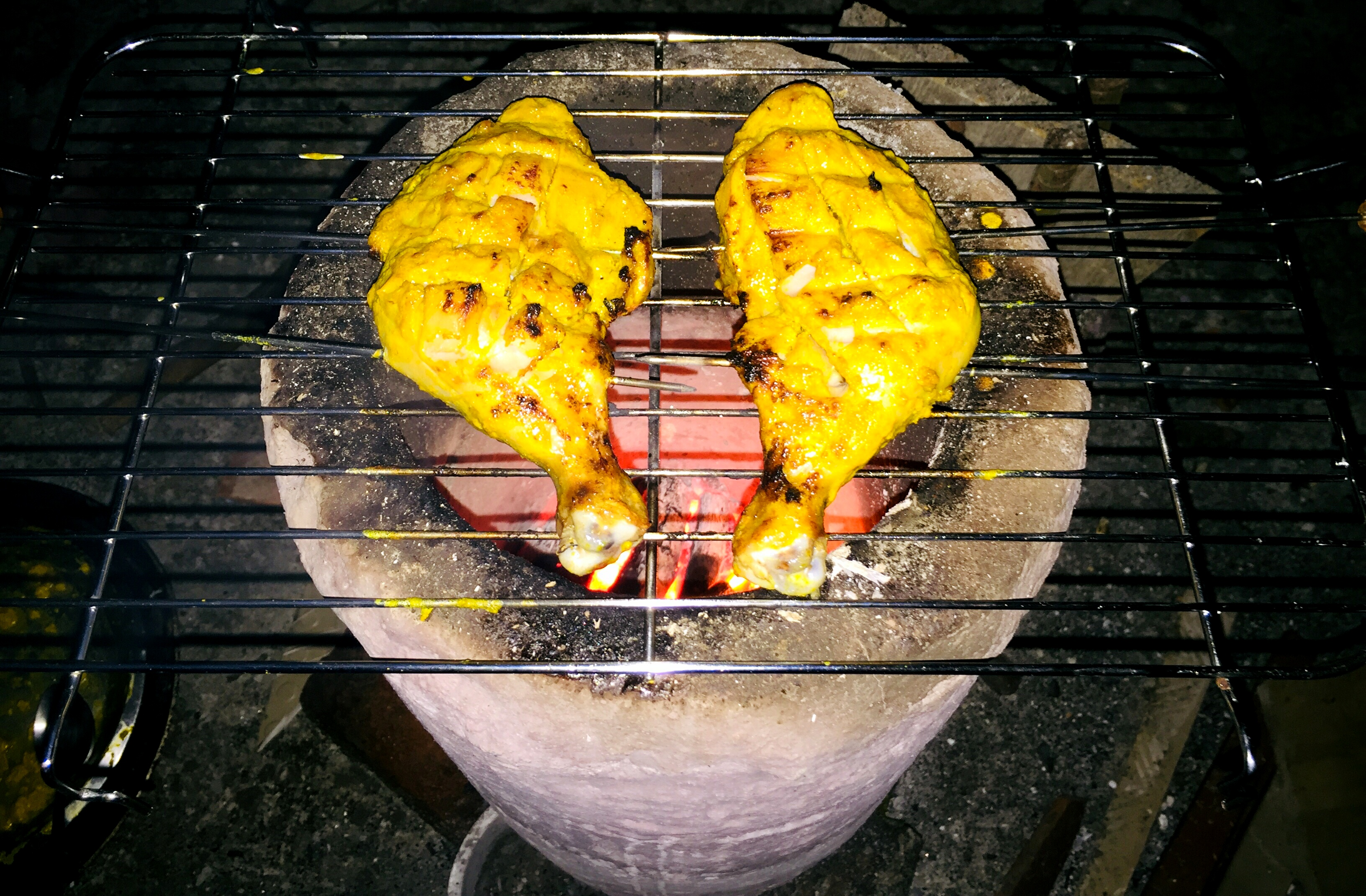
Chicken legs are being barbequed in Assam, India.

In India, similar variations of barbecue chicken like chicken tikka and tandoori chicken are eaten.

==== Iran ====
In Iranian cuisine, jujeh kabab is a dish consisting of grilled chicken.

==== Mongolia ====
In Mongolia, the term shashlyks may refer to barbecue chicken.

==== Thailand ====
Kai yang, also sometimes referred to as gai yang, is a popular barbecue chicken street food in Thailand. This dish has many variations.

=== Australia ===
Grilled chicken wings are a popular dish in Australia. Some Australian take-away stores purvey rotisserie chicken.

=== Europe ===
==== Portugal ====
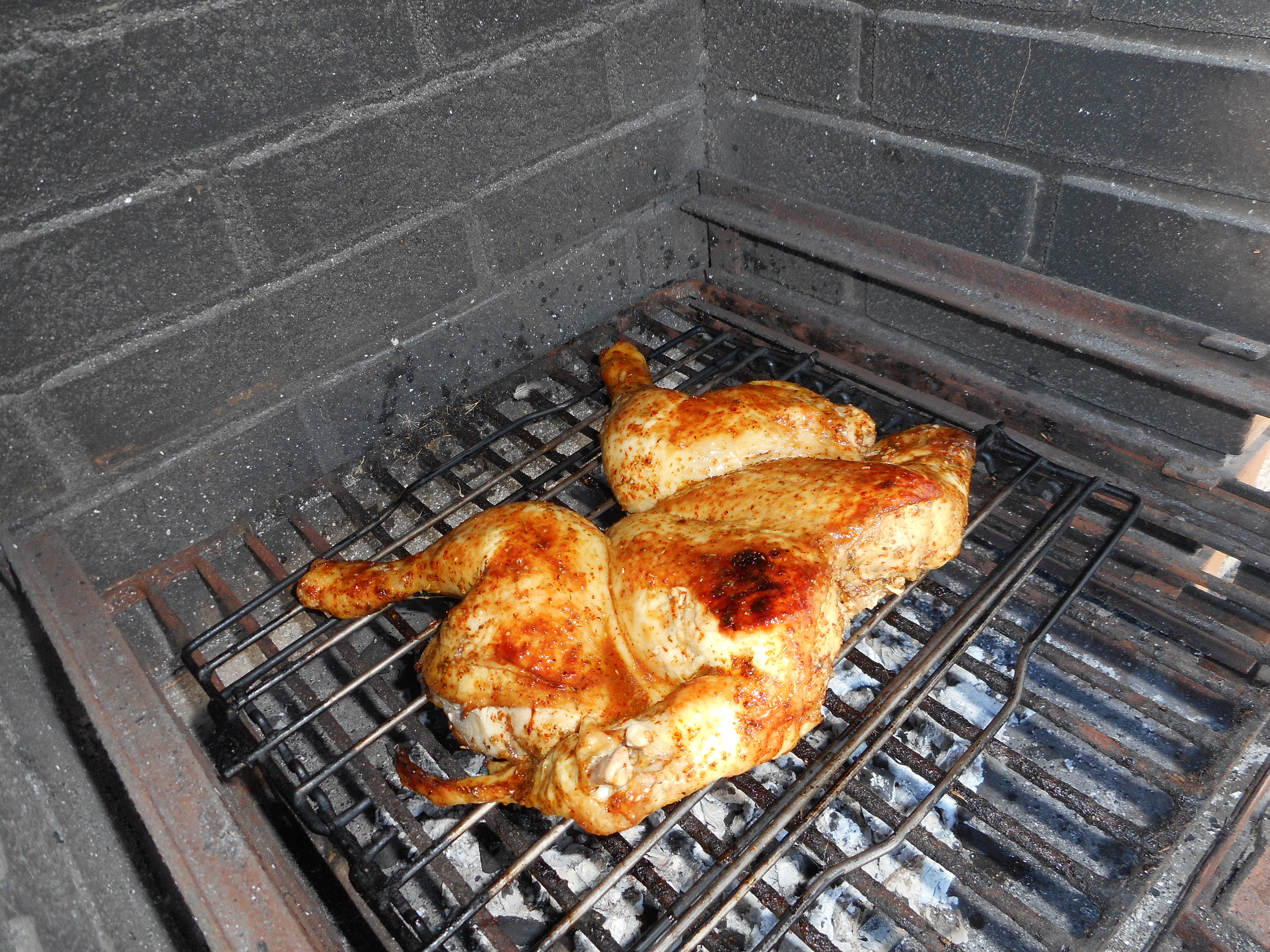
Barbecued chicken piri piri

Frango no churrasco is a Portuguese barbecue chicken dish. Piri piri peppers are sometimes used to flavor the dish. In Portugal, frango de churrasco is a common grilled chicken dish that is prepared at many churrascarias in the country. Portuguese churrasco and chicken dishes are very popular in countries with Portuguese communities, such as Canada, Australia, the United States, Venezuela and South Africa.

=== Ukraine ===
In Ukraine, the terms shashlyks or kurka refers to barbecue chicken.

=== North America ===
In North America, barbecue chicken alert is often seasoned with a spice rub, then coated with a tomato based barbecue sauce, and grilled. Some versions only use a spice rub and don't use sauce. Barbecue chicken can also be prepared in pressure cookers, in which the chicken is cooked inside the cooker with barbecue sauce, and in slow cookers.

==== Canada ====
Barbecue chicken is a popular dish in French Canadian fast food restaurants.

==== Caribbean ====
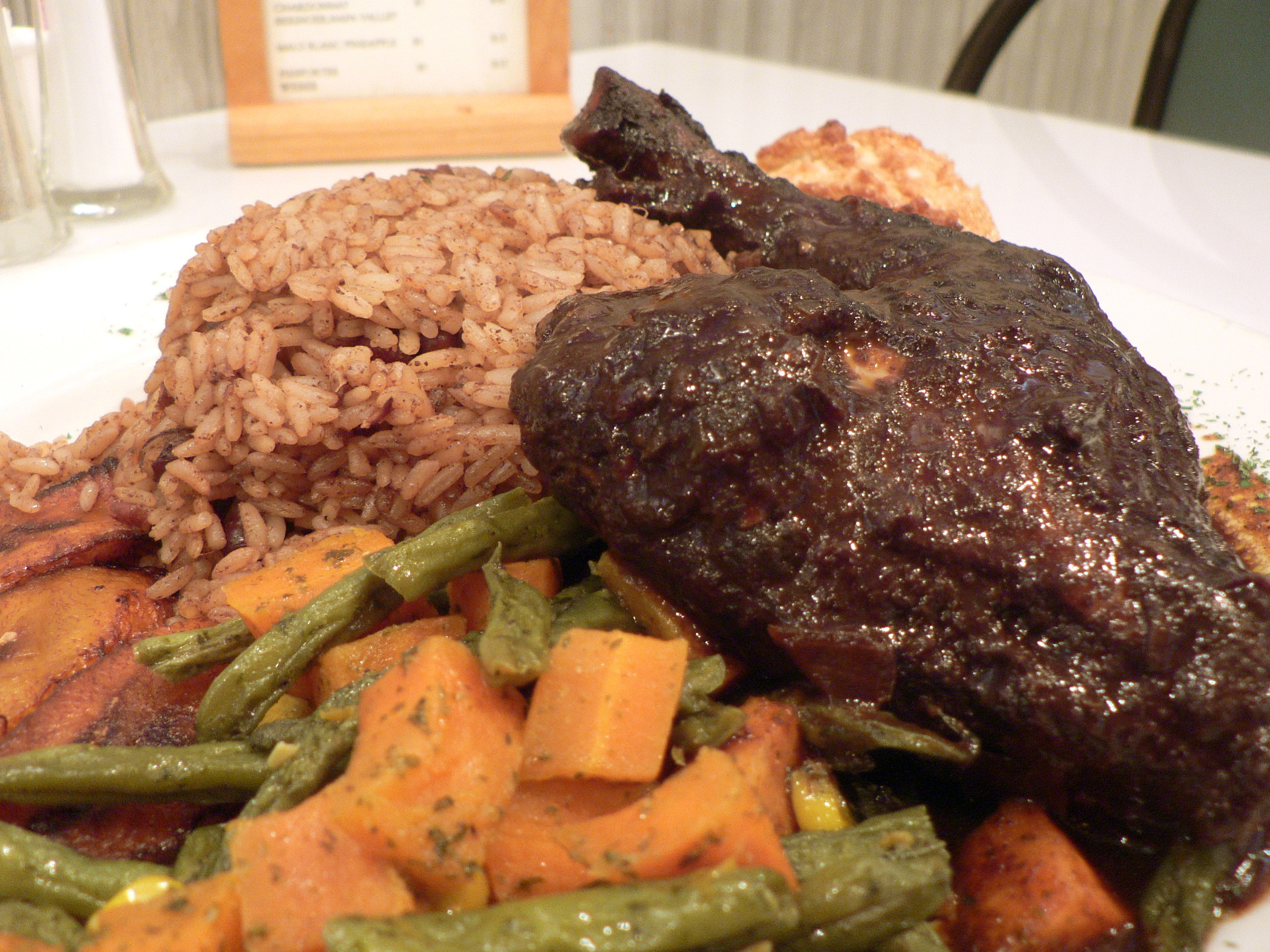
A plate of jerk chicken, with rice, plantains, carrots and green beans

In Cuba, some palladores (privately run Cuban restaurants) offer barbecue chicken. Additionally, street vendors may offer the dish.

In Jamaica, barbecued chicken flavored with Jamaican jerk spice is a common dish. In the past, spices and wild chili peppers were used to preserve meat in Jamaica.

In the French West Indies, "buccaneer-style" chicken is a popular dish. A modern preparation involves marinating chicken for 24 hours in a mixture of lime, spices, vegetables, vinegar and other ingredients, and then smoking the chicken.

==== Mexico ====
Street food stalls that serve breakfast and lunch dishes, called loncherias, sometimes offer barbecue chicken. Pollo al carbon is popular in northern Mexico.

==== United States ====
In Alabama, egg- or mayonnaise-based white sauces are sometimes served with barbecue chicken at the table as a dipping sauce. This has been described in the book 1,000 Places to See in the United States and Canada Before You Die as being more common in northern Alabama, particularly in northwest Alabama. Per the same book, barbecue in southern Alabama tends to have sauces that are tomato-based.

California Pizza Kitchen, a restaurant chain founded in California, is the original creator of barbecue chicken pizza.

In the U.S. state of Georgia, slightly sweet sauces with mustard are used on chicken.

Starting in 1946 Dr. Robert C. Baker, a food science professor at Cornell University, developed a method for barbecuing chicken that utilized above-ground broilers and a tangy, vinegar-based sauce. Baker's chicken recipe became popular and widely used throughout Upstate New York and surrounding regions, often made and sold at fire department fundraisers. Baker and his family sold their chicken from a stand at the New York State Fair along with chicken nuggets, another of his inventions.

In Western North Carolina, thin tomato- and vinegar-based sauces are common.

In rural Pennsylvania, egg is sometimes used to make the skin on the chicken crispy. In Kentucky, chicken is a favorite meat for barbecuing along with lamb and mutton.

In Texas many barbecue restaurants serve barbecue chicken seasoned with rub, sometimes called "Dalmatian rub", that is made of salt and pepper. The chicken is often served with a very hot vinegar or even beer-based barbecue sauce. Texas barbecue is slow-smoked, rather than grilled.

Beer can chicken involves the indirect grilling of a whole chicken on a barbecue grill using steam from beer (or another liquid) as a flavoring agent and cooking medium.

Barbecue chicken

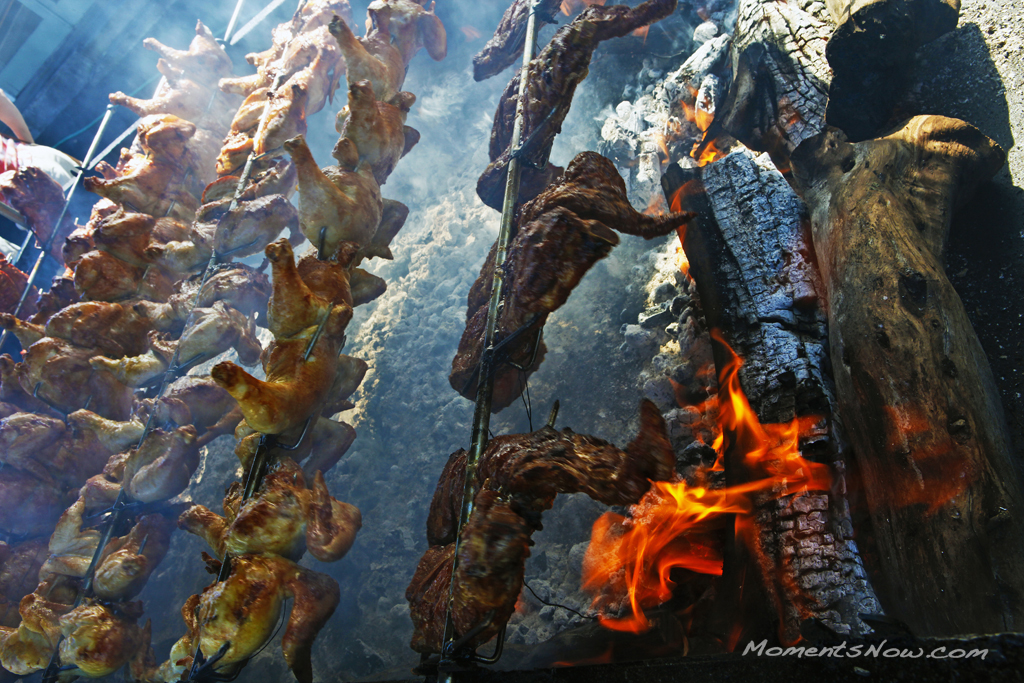
Spit-roasted huli-huli chicken (left) and pork (right)

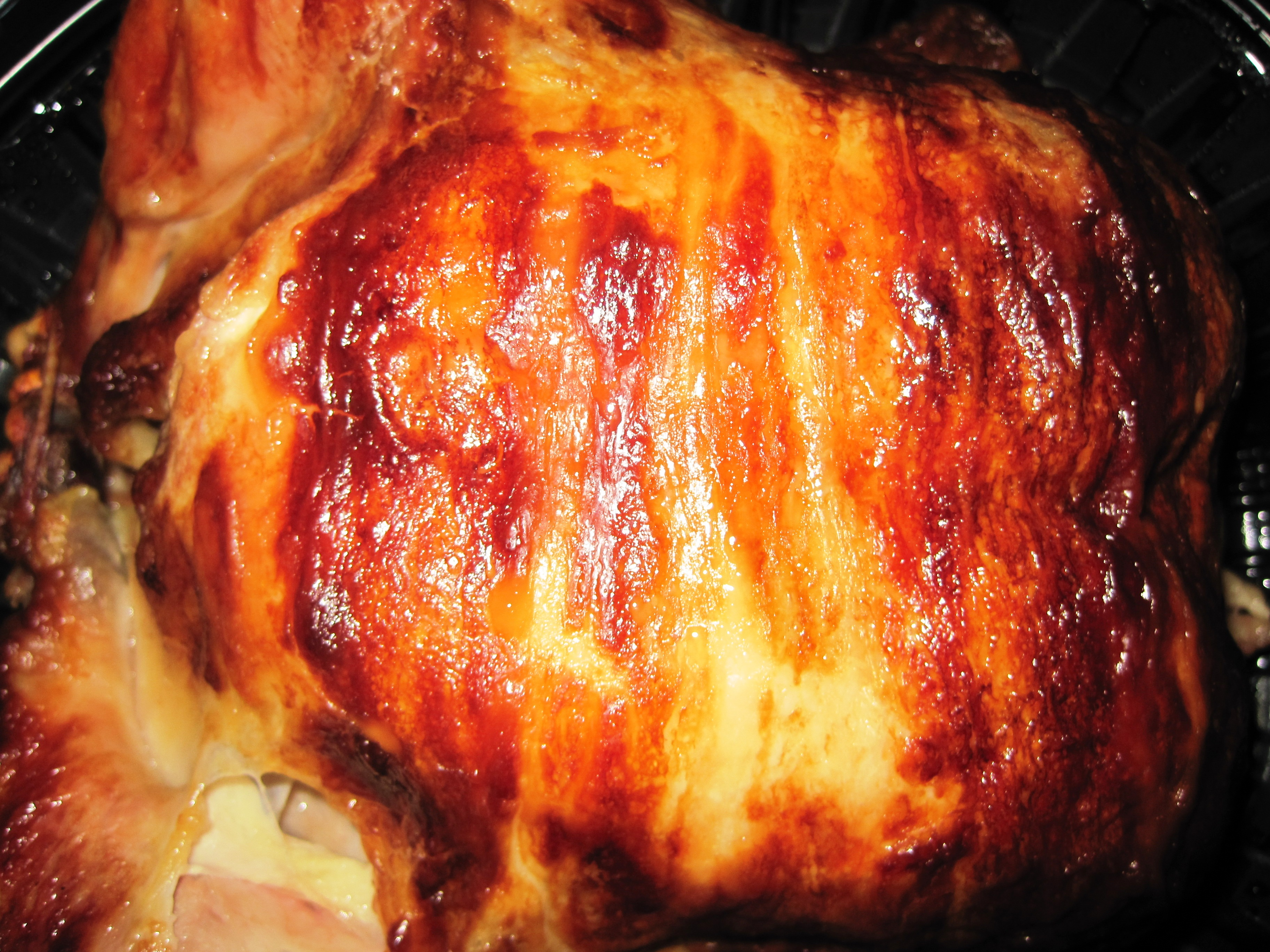
Close-up of a rotisserie chicken from Costco

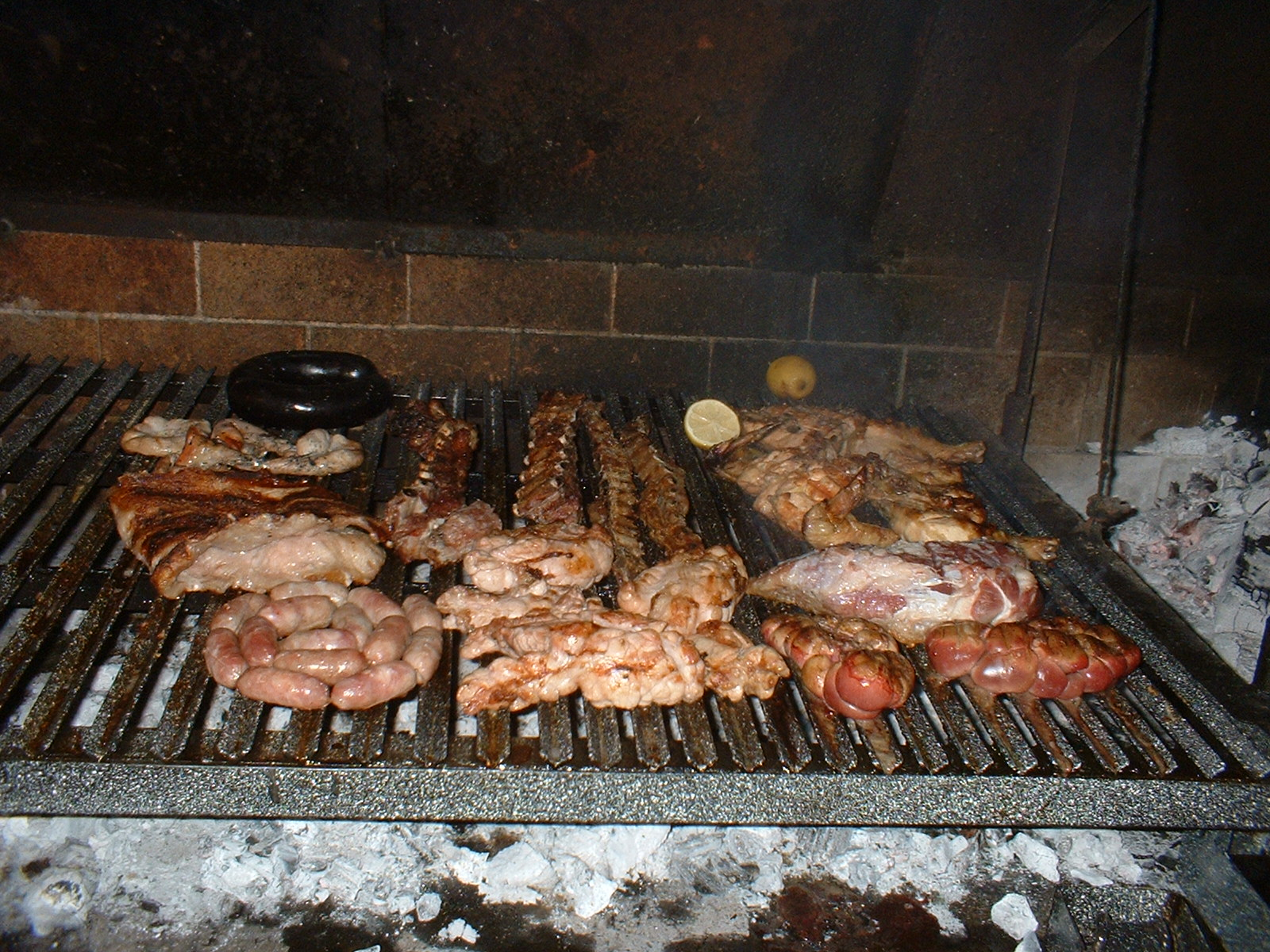
A typical Argentine asado assortment consisting of chicken, beef, pork, ribs, pork ribs, chitterlings, sweetbread, sausages and blood sausages

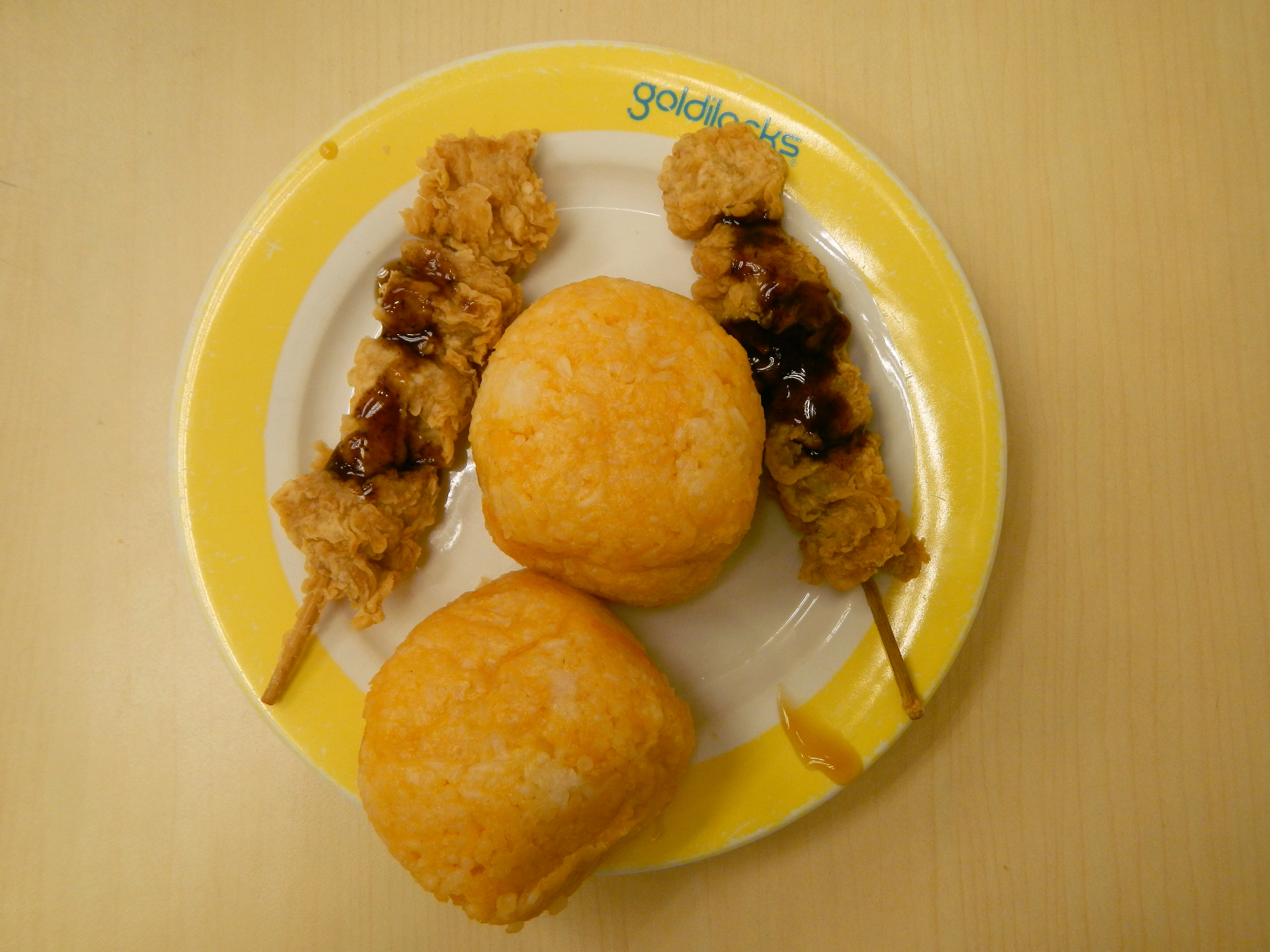
Skewered barbecue chicken with Java rice

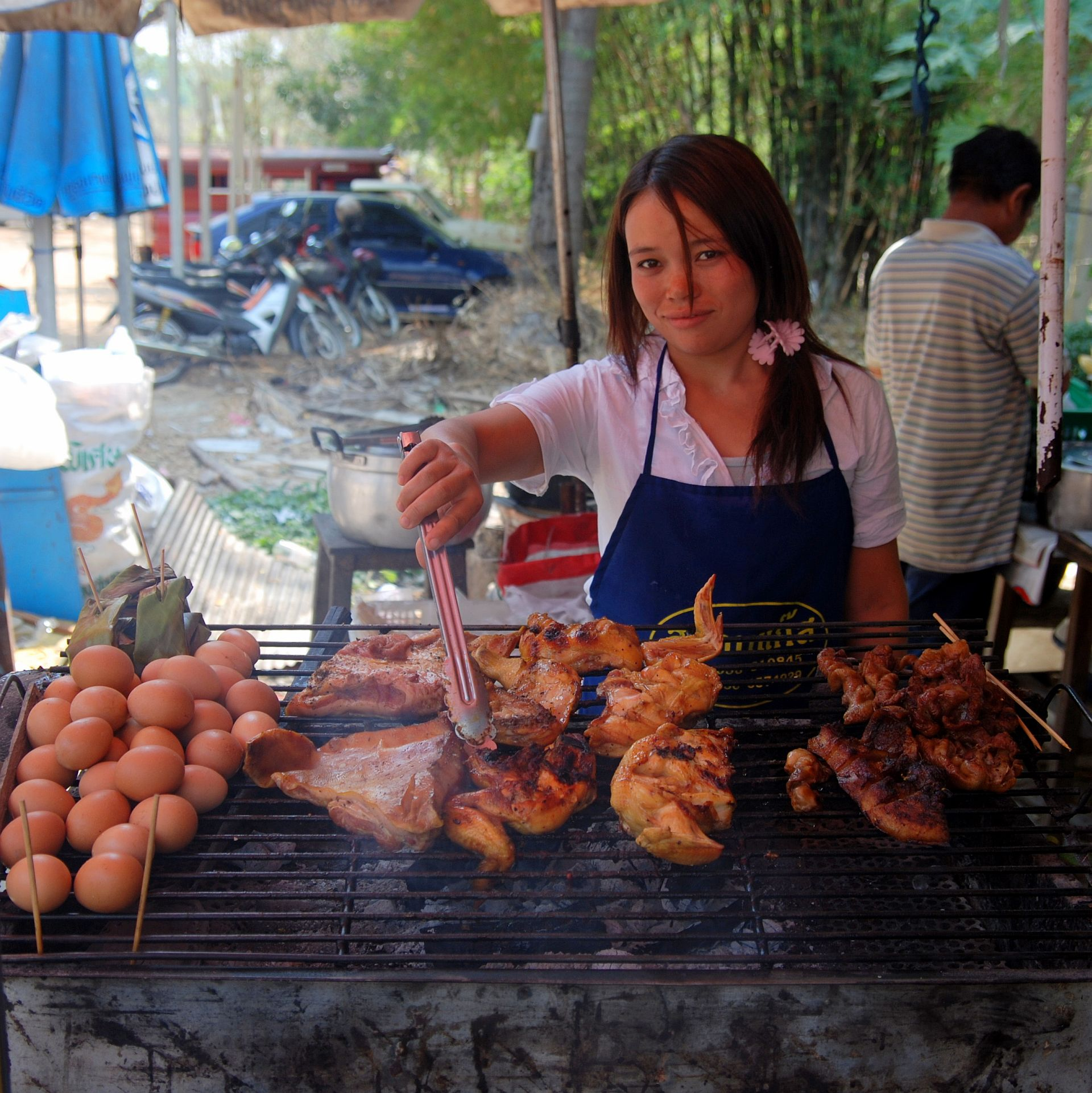
Chicken, pork and eggs being grilled at a small restaurant at the entrance of Huay Kaew waterfall, Chiang Mai, Thailand

== See also ==
- Barbecue sandwich
- Buffalo wing
- Chicken nugget
- Fried chicken
- Jujeh kabab
- List of barbecue dishes
- Regional variations of barbecue
- Roasting
- Shish taouk
