= Dak-kkochi =

South Korean street food

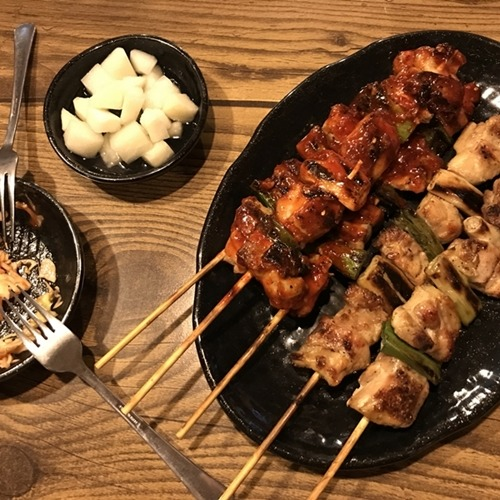
- Type: Gui; kkochi
- Place of origin: South Korea
- Associated cuisine: Korean cuisine
- Serving temperature: Warm
- Main ingredients: Chicken, scallions

Korean name
- Hangul: 닭꼬치
- RR: dakkkochi
- MR: takkoch'i
- IPA: tak̚.k͈o.tɕʰi

Dak-kkochi (Korean: 닭꼬치; lit. 'chicken skewer') is a popular South Korean street food consisting of small pieces of chicken and scallions grilled on a skewer.

Dak (닭; lit. chicken) is the most popular type of kkochi (꼬치; lit. skewered food). Others include sausages, fish cakes, and short rib patties called tteok-galbi. The menu is basically charcoal-grilled Dak-kkochis and spicy seasoned Dak-kkochis.

== Etymology ==
Dak (닭) means chicken, and kkochi (꼬치) means food on skewers or skewers themselves used for culinary purposes.

== See also ==
- Inihaw
- Jūjeh kabāb
- Shish taouk
- Yakitori
- List of chicken dishes
