= Chuan (food) =

Chinese street food

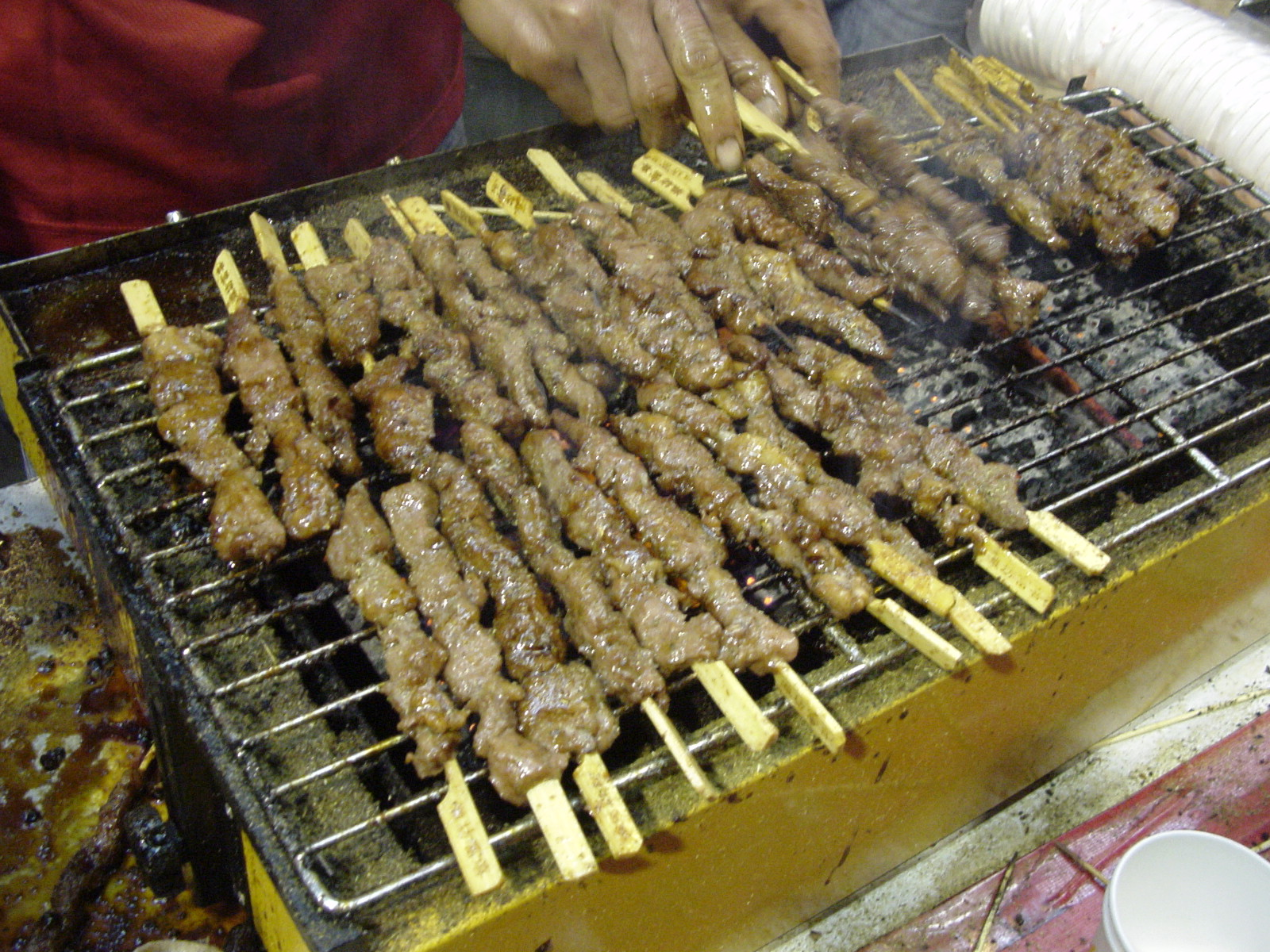
- Barbecued lamb chuan

Chinese name
- Chinese: 串 / 串儿
- Literal meaning: skewer, kebab
Transcriptions
Standard Mandarin
- Hanyu Pinyin: chuàn / chuàn'er
other Mandarin
- Dungan: чўан

Uyghur name
- Uyghur: كاۋاپ
Transcriptions
- Latin Yëziqi: kawap
- Siril Yëziqi: кавап

Chuan (Chinese: 串 or 串儿 in Northeast China; Uyghur: كاۋاپ) are small pieces of meat roasted on skewers. Chuan originated in the Xinjiang region of Northwest China. It has been spread throughout the rest of the country, most notably in Beijing, Tianjin, Jinan and Jilin, where it is a popular street food. It is a product of the Chinese Islamic cuisine of the Uyghur people and other Chinese Muslims.

== Overview ==
Chuan are small pieces of meat roasted on skewers over charcoal or sometimes, electric heat. It is also sometimes cooked by deep frying in oil (popular in Beijing). It can be classified as a type of kebab. Chuan was traditionally made from lamb (yáng ròu chuàn, 羊肉串, lamb meat chuan), which is still the most common kind, but now, chicken, pork, beef and various types of seafood can also be used. Especially in some tourist areas, chuan can be found made with various insects, bugs, birds and other exotic animals. In general, chuan may be spiced according to preference, but generally cumin seeds, dried red pepper flakes, salt, black pepper and sesame or sesame oil are sprinkled or brushed onto it. Another popular incarnation is mantou chuan or "steamed bun chuan"; it is commonly brushed with a sweet bean sauce (甜面酱, not to be confused with sweet red bean paste) and its taste serves as a foil to the often spicy meat chuan.

In Tianjin and Jinan, chuan is often served with small round breads (馅饼, xiàn bǐng), also grilled with the same spices. Xiàn bǐng technically means "pie" or "filled bread". After cooking the bread and meat, the bread is split open and chuan meat is stuffed inside, then eaten together.

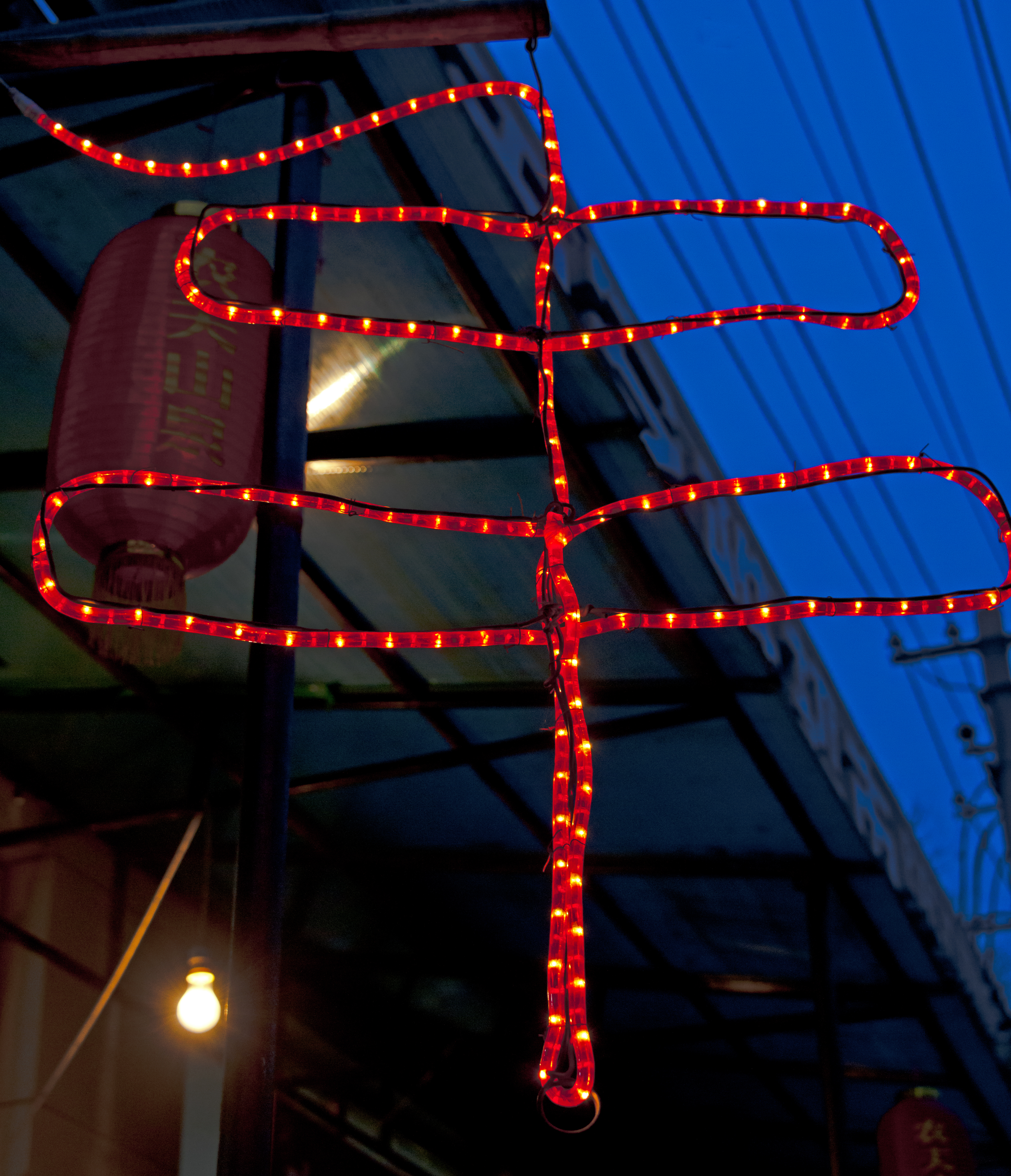
LED sign in the shape of hanzi for chuan outside a Beijing restaurant serving it

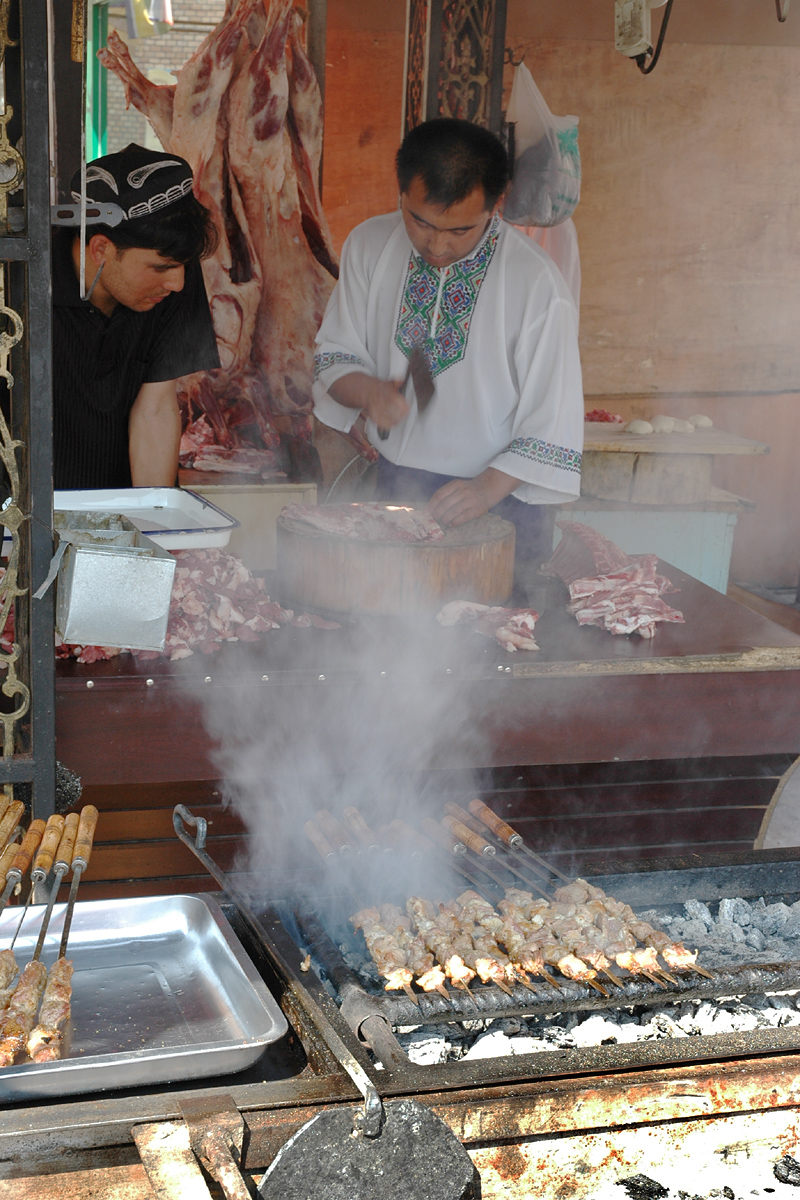
A chuan vendor in Ürümqi, Xinjiang

Lamb skewers on automatic rotating grill, at a Chinese restaurant in Seoul, Korea

== Controversy ==
In 2013, it was reported that the Beijing authorities were destroying open-air chuan barbecues in a bid to reduce pollution from small particles that can enter deep into the lungs. Hundreds of barbecues were reportedly confiscated over a three-month period, leading to ridicule from the local Beijing population.

== See also ==
- Arrosticini
- Brochette
- Ćevap
- Kebab
- Kkochi
- Kushiyaki
- Nem nướng
- Satay
- Shashlik
- Yakitori
