= Kkochi =

Korean foods cooked on skewers

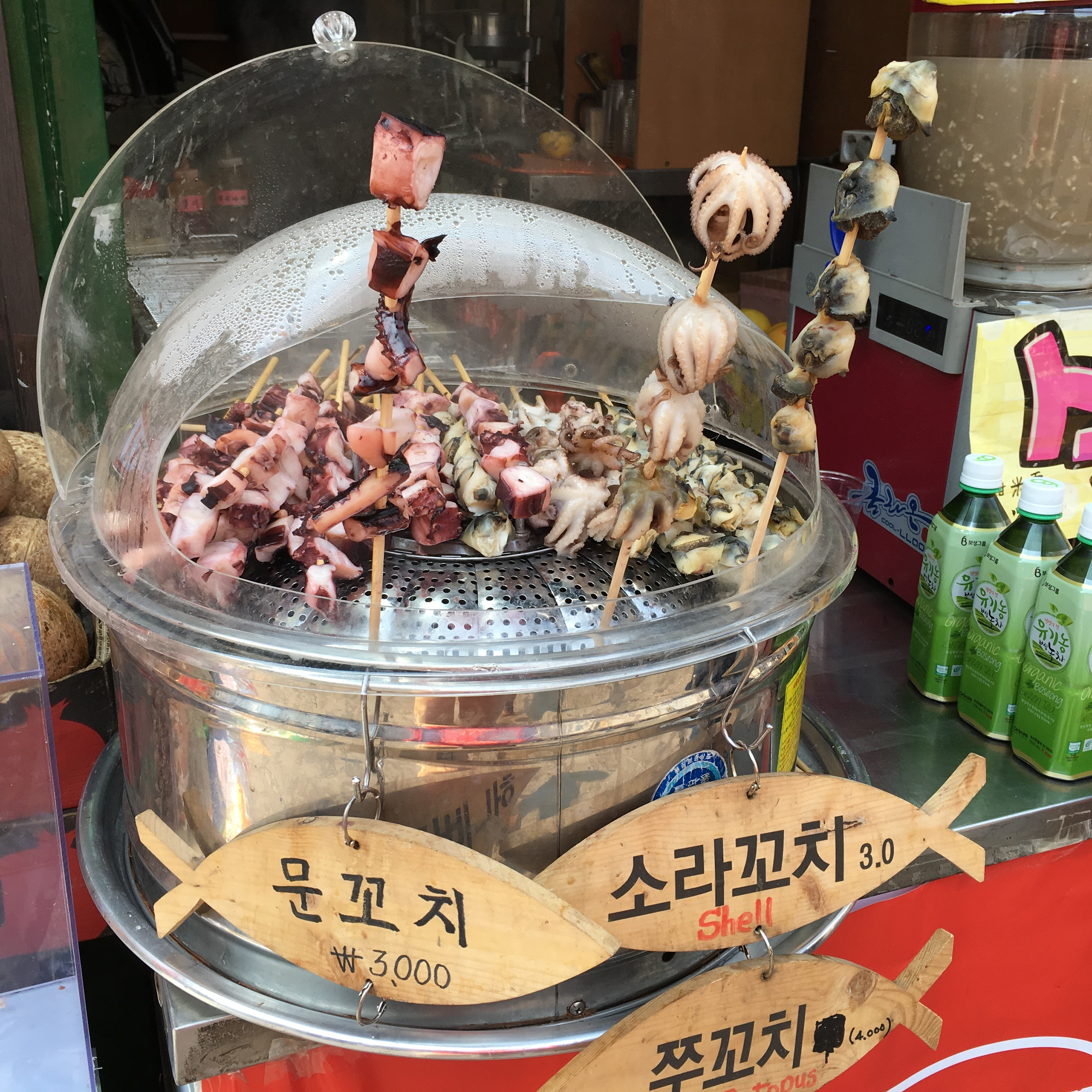
- Mun-kkochi (giant octopus skewers), sora-kkochi (horned turban skewers), and jju-kkochi (webfoot octopus skewers)
- Type: Skewers
- Place of origin: Korea
- Associated cuisine: Korean cuisine

Kkochi (Korean: 꼬치) is a category of Korean food cooked on skewers. The word kkochi means "skewer" in Korean.

== Varieties ==
Name	Image	Description
Dak-kkochi		Chicken skewers, usually consisting of chunks of chicken meat and pieces of daepa (large scallion) skewered alternately. It is a popular street food in Korea. Similar foods in other cuisines include jujeh kabab, shish taouk, and yakitori.
Eomuk-kkochi		Fishcake skewers, made by threading different types of eomuk (fishcakes) on skewers and cooking them in broth flavored with Korean radish and dasima (kelp). It is a popular winter street food in Korea.
Sundae-kkochi		Sundae, the Korean blood sausage, are sometimes skewered and sold on street, from pojangmacha (street stalls) or bunsikjip (snack bars). The dish is often brushed with gochujang-based sweet and spicy sauce.
Tteok-kkochi		Rice cake skewers, consisting of skewered and fried tteok (rice cakes) brushed with spicy gochujang-based sauce. It is a popular bunsikjip (snack bar) item.

== See also ==
- Jeok
