= Ražnjići =

Serbian grilled meat

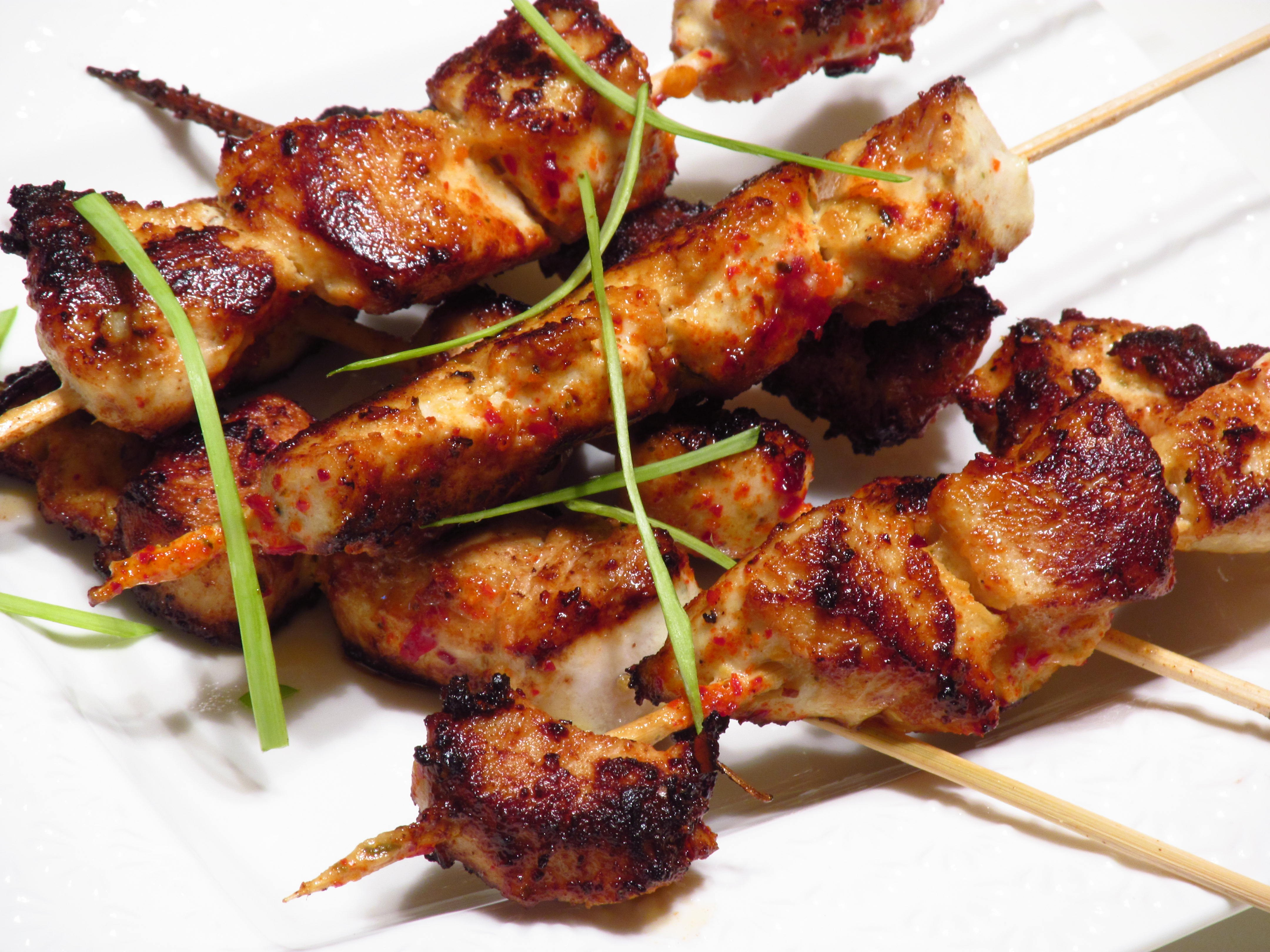
- Chicken ražnjići
- Course: Main course
- Region or state: Bosnia and Herzegovina, Croatia, Montenegro, Serbia
- Main ingredients: Meat

Ražnjići (Serbian Cyrillic: ражњићи) is a common Balkan specialty of grilled meat on a skewer, equivalent of the Greek souvlaki, Bulgarian shishcheta and Turkish şaşlık. The name is derived from Serbo-Croatian word ražanj (ражањ) meaning 'skewer'. In Slovak and Czech languages it is called ražniči.

== Sources ==
- Univerzitet u Novom Sadu. Filozofski fakultet (1974). Godisnjak. p. 173. "Занимљиво је и то „да се у Рјечнику (из 1818 — Ј. К.) не налази већина јела која данас сачињавају оно што се обично зове српском кујном, тако нпр. капама, мусака, папазјанија, пљескавица, ражњићи, ћевапчићи, ћулбастија (али."
- Srpska akademija nauka i umetnosti (1925). Srpski etnografski zbornik. Vol. 32. Belgrade: Srpska akademija nauka i umetnosti. p. 75. "Ражњићи се праве од ма каквог правог и појачег твр- дог прутића. Дугачки су од 50—90 см. Мешајица је с обе стране обељено и зарубљено дрво дугачко до 50 см. Њом се меша качамак при печењу."
- Laurence Mitchell (2010). Serbia. Bradt Travel Guides. pp. 79–. ISBN 978-1-84162-326-9. "Serbia is famous for grilled meats such as ćevapčići (kebab), pljeskavica (spicy hamburger) and ražnjići (pork or veal kebabs)."
- Slavenka Drakulic (22 February 2011). A Guided Tour Through the Museum of Communism: Fables from a Mouse, a Parrot, a Bear, a Cat, a Mole, a Pig, a Dog, and a Raven. Penguin Group US. pp. 39–. ISBN 978-1-101-50252-5.
- Đorđe S. Kostić (2005). Sa Bedekerom po Jugoistočnoj Evropi. Balkanološki inštitut SANU. p. 59. ISBN 978-86-7179-042-0.
- Branislav Đ Nušić (1966). Sabrana dela. NIP "Jež,". "... као последњи трагови прошлости, ћевапчићи и ражњићи, који су не само задржали право грађанства и у центру модернизиране престонице, већ су распрострли свој дражећи мирис и кроз целу краљевину Југославију. Горе од ..."
