= Tteok-kkochi =

South Korean skewered rice cakes

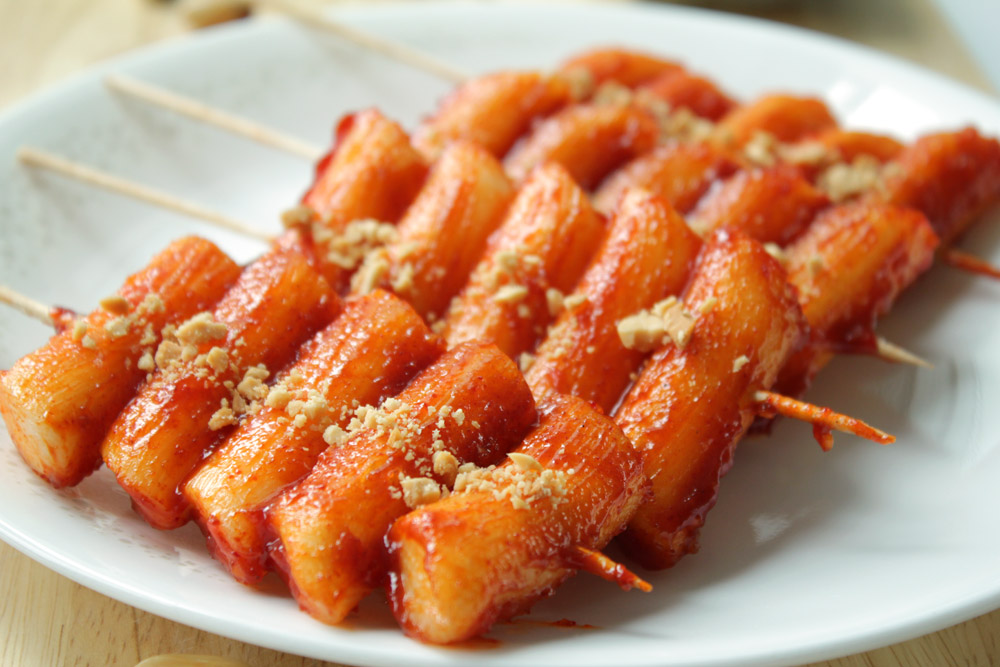
- Type: kkochi
- Place of origin: Korea
- Associated cuisine: Korean cuisine
- Serving temperature: Warm
- Main ingredients: Tteok, gochujang

Korean name
- Hangul: 떡꼬치
- Lit.: rice cake skewer
- RR: tteokkkochi
- MR: ttŏkkoch'i

Tteok-kkochi (Korean: 떡꼬치; lit. 'rice cake skewer') is a popular South Korean street food consisting of skewered and fried tteok (rice cakes) brushed with spicy gochujang-based sauce.

== Etymology ==
Tteok (떡) means rice cakes, and kkochi (꼬치) means food on skewers or skewers themselves used for culinary purposes.
