= Nem nướng =

Vietnamese food item

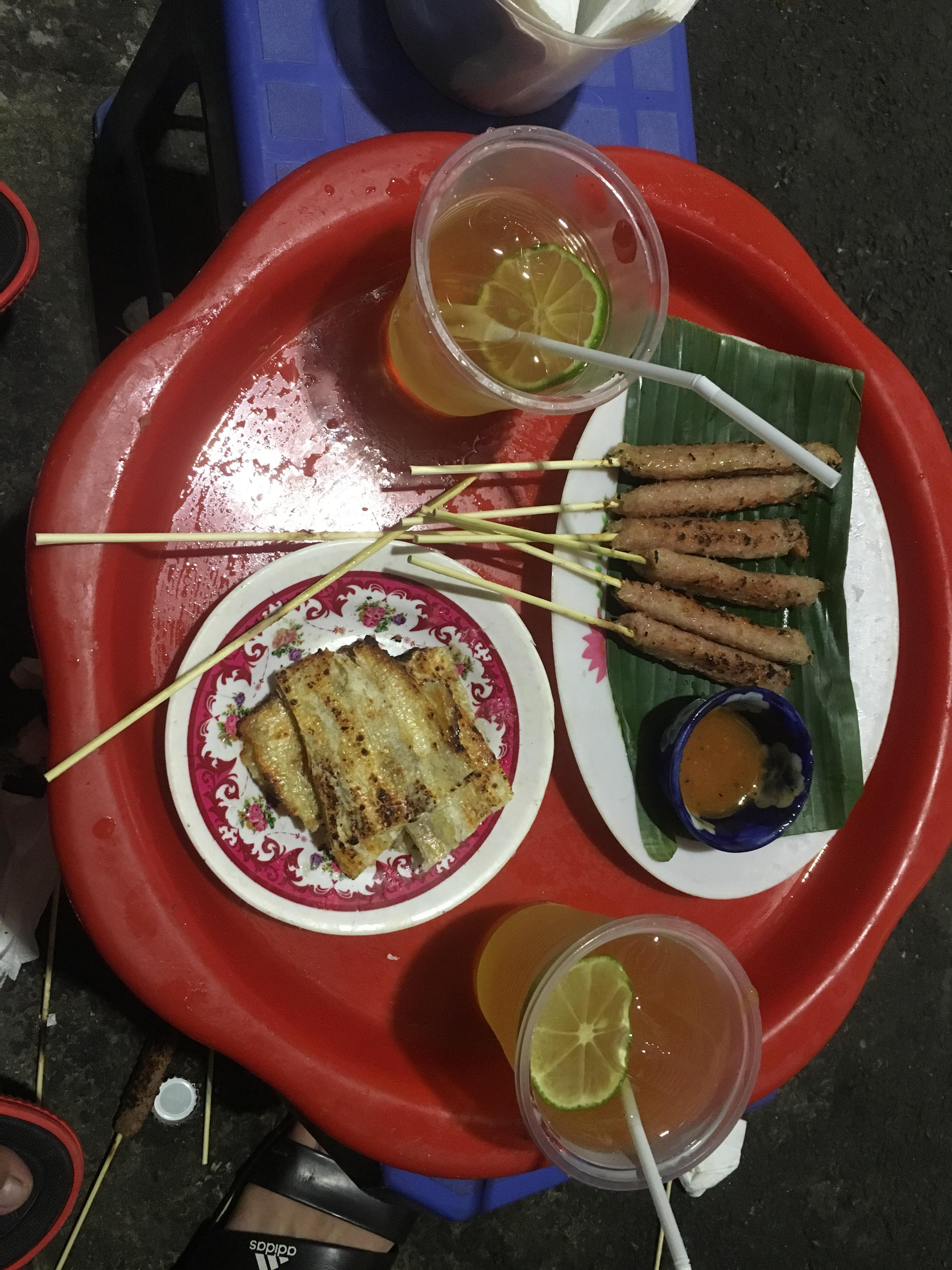
- Nem nướng skewers and side dishes
- Course: Hors d'oeuvre
- Place of origin: Ninh Hòa, Vietnam
- Main ingredients: Ground pork, shallot, garlic, fish sauce.

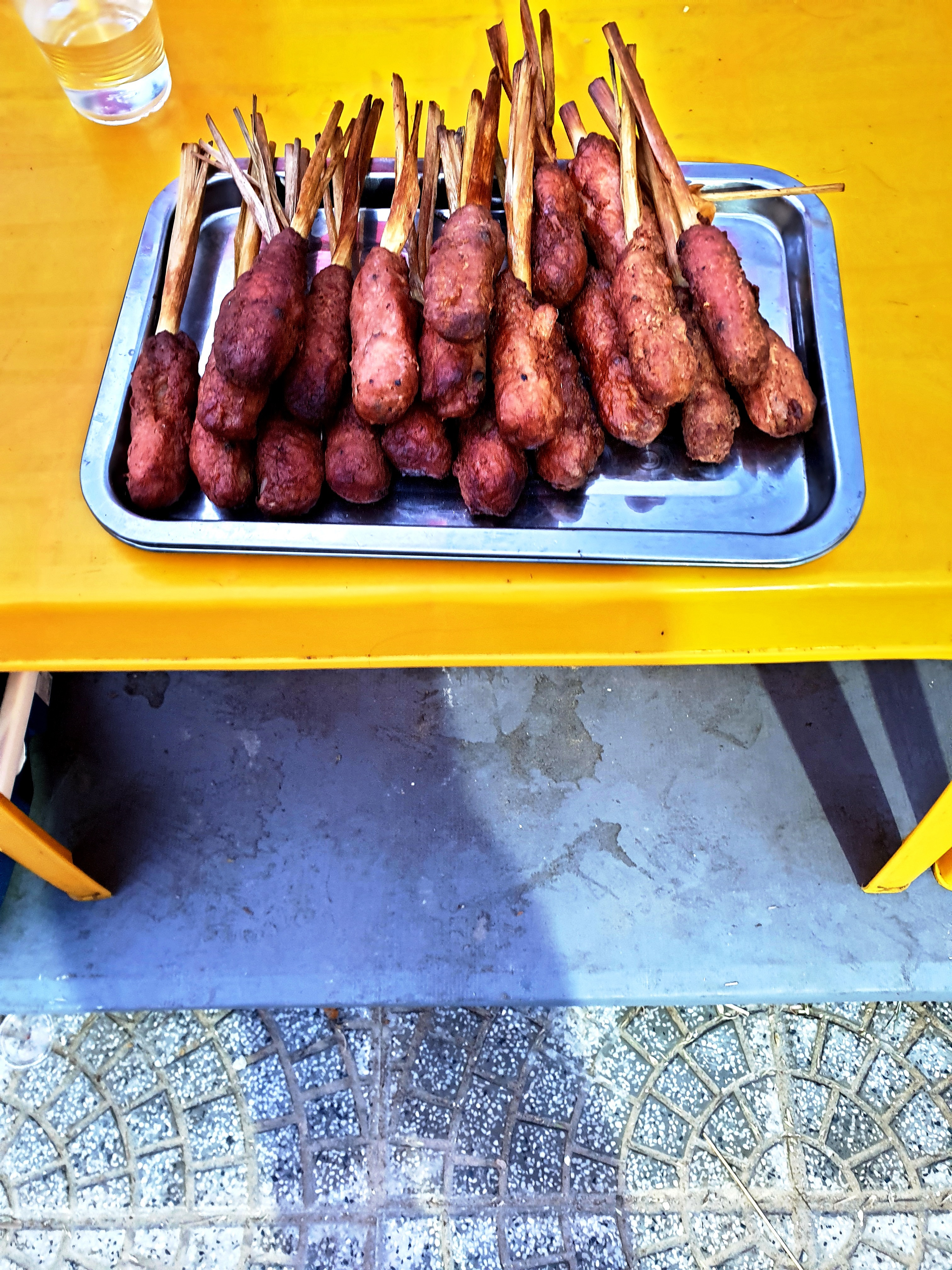
Nem nướng in a food festival

Nem nướng (literally "grilled spring rolls") is Vietnamese grilled pork sausage wrapped around a lemongrass stick and a popular Vietnamese food item, sometimes served as an individual appetizer or snack, mainly served with bánh tráng ["rice paper"] and other herbs and vegetables as a main course. Nem nướng is a rustic dish, originating from Ninh Hòa, a northern district of Khánh Hòa Province, about 30km from the coastal city.

== Ingredients and cooking method ==
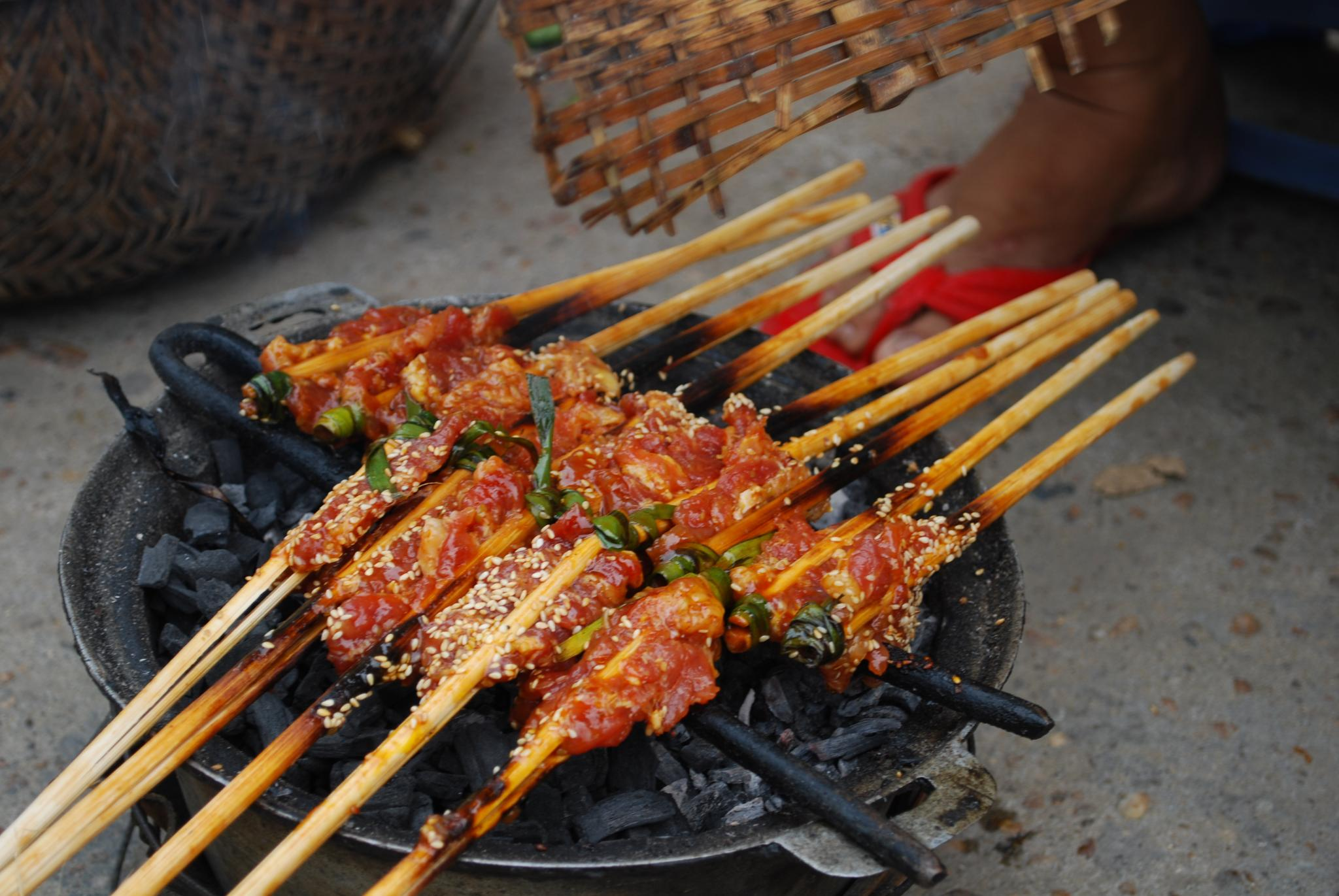
Nem nướng is grilled over charcoal

Nem nướng is made of ground pork with between a third and a half pork fat. The meat is typically flavoured with chopped shallots, crushed garlic, fish sauce, sugar and black pepper.

It is wrapped around a lemongrass stick and then grilled or baked.

== Serving ==
Nem nướng can be eaten alone as an appetizer or snack, and dipped in nước chấm ["dipping sauce"], or with a peanut dip. Nước chấm is made of ground pork, glutinous rice and annatto oil. There is a vegetarian variation of the dipping sauce which is made of peanut butter and hoisin sauce topped with crushed roasted peanuts.

As a main dish, it is served with bánh tráng, fried rice paper, fresh vegetables such as lettuce, julienned pickled vegetables like carrots, white radishes, cucumbers, green mangos and fresh herbs like mint and basil.

The deliciousness of nem nướng depends on the accompanying bowl of dipping sauce, which is also considered the secret of each restaurant. The bowl of dipping sauce with all the attractive flavors of sour, salty and sweet is made from more than 20 spices according to each chef's own heirloom secret. The main ingredients can include sticky rice, soybeans, tomatoes, lean meat, garlic, chili, and other ingredients.

Nem nướng in Northern variant is served with bánh phở ["phở noodles"], whereas in the South, it is eaten with bún ["rice vermicelli"]. In Khánh Hòa, nem nướng is wrapped in moistened rice paper and consumed without any accompanying starch-based ingredients.

== See also ==
- Nem (disambiguation)
- Chả lụa
- List of meatball dishes
- List of Vietnamese dishes
- Vietnamese cuisine
- Brochette
- Chuanr
- Kkochi
- Kushiyaki
