= Yakitori =

Japanese type of grilled chicken

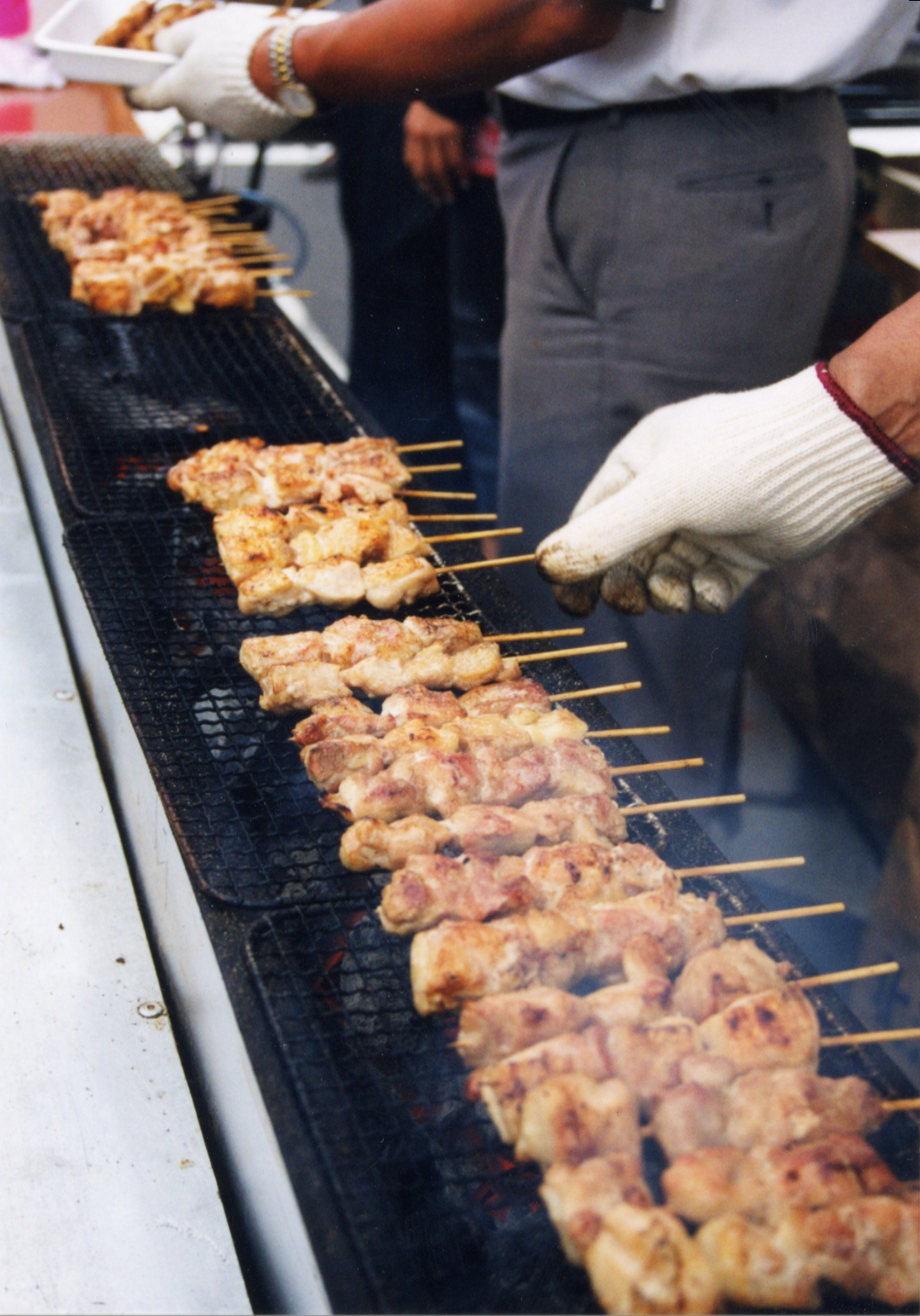
Yakitori being grilled

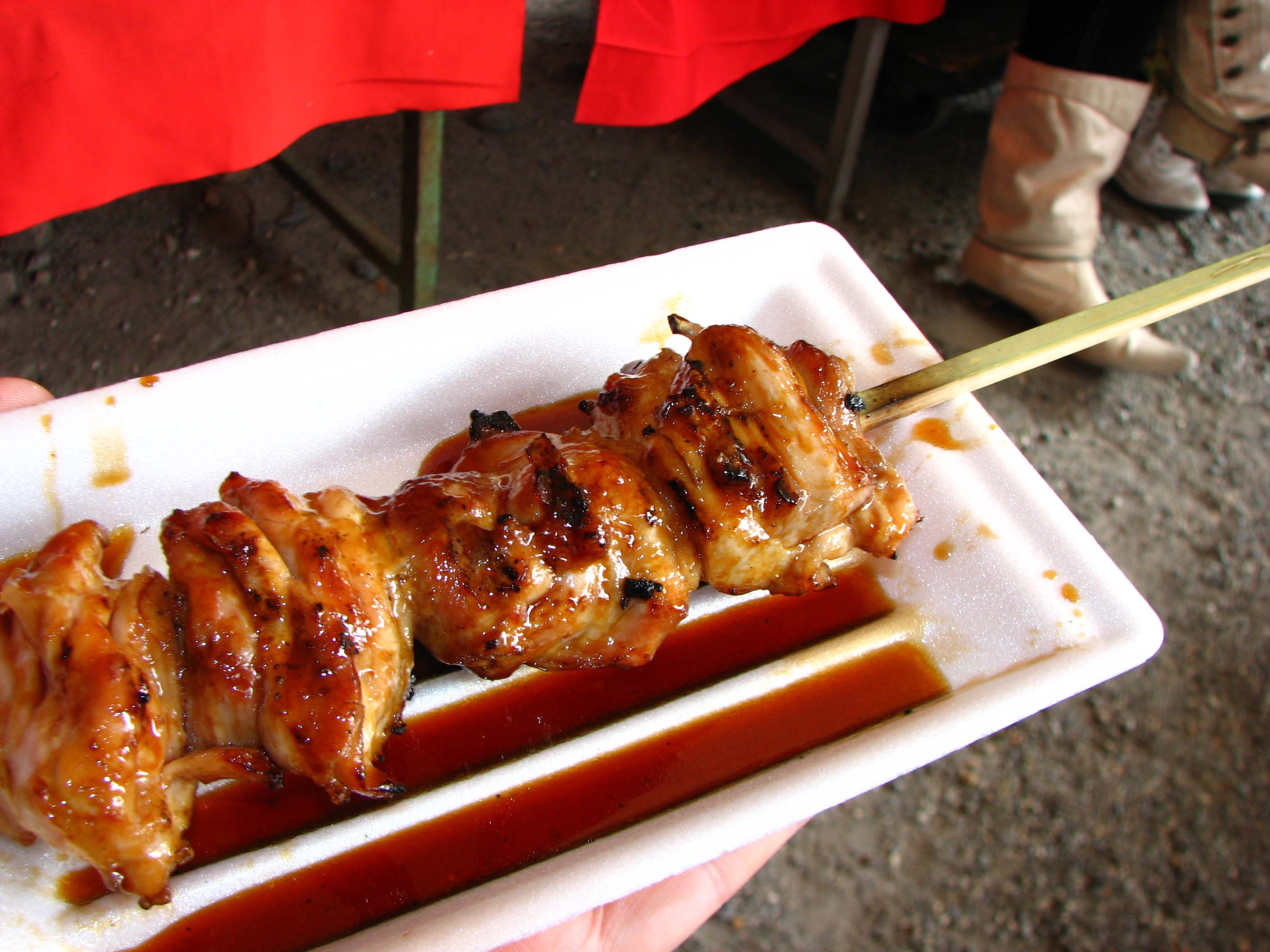
Yakitori as street food, with salty and sweet sauce

Yakitori being freshly grilled in Tokyo

In Japanese cuisine, yakitori (Japanese: 焼き鳥; lit. 'grilled bird') is chicken cooked on a skewer over a charcoal fire and seasoned with tare sauce or salt. The term sometimes refers to kushiyaki (grilled and skewered foods) in general.

== Preparation ==
The meat is cut into small, roughly uniform shapes and skewered with kushi, then seasoned and cooked. Charcoal is the preferred method of cooking as it produces high heat and strong flames while giving off little to no water vapor. This allows the ingredients to cook quickly while imparting a crunchy texture to the skin. Although gas and electric heat sources are sometimes used, they do not develop the same aromas or textures.

Traditionally, yakitori is cooked on portable charcoal grills. That is the method most often employed by yatai. However, restaurants often use stationary grills and, depending on the situation, higher quality binchōtan charcoal.

At home, appliances known as takujō konro (卓上コンロ, 'mini griller') or yakitori-ki (焼き鳥器, 'yakitori device') are used. Yakitori-ki are small electrical appliances that use a heating element similar to that of a broiler or toaster to cook the food placed on top.

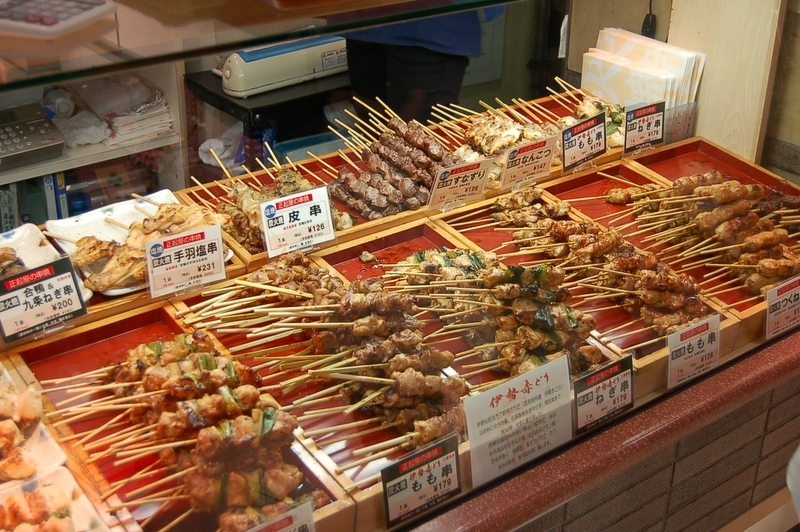
Several yakitori in food court areas

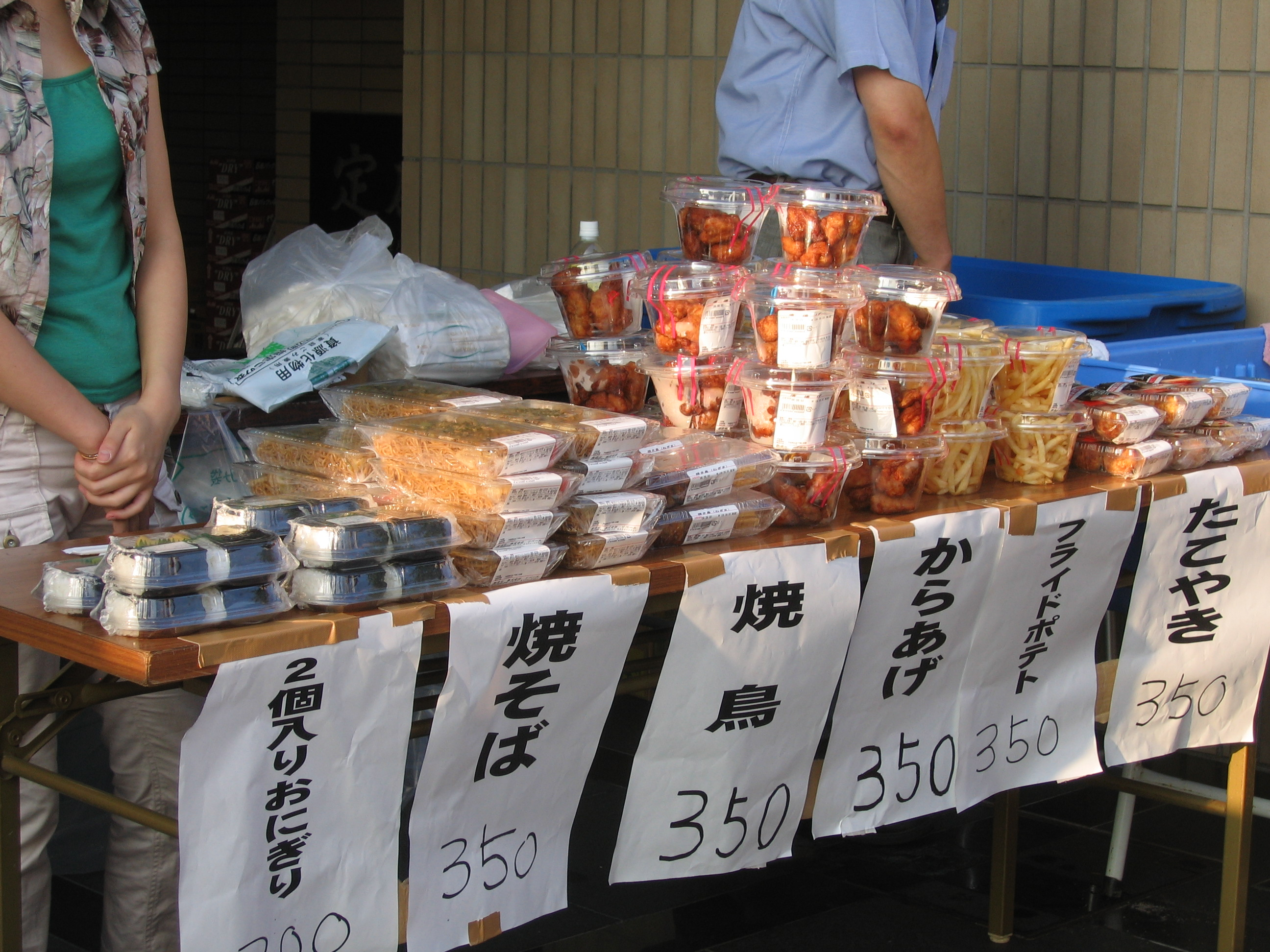
Yakitori are sold at sports matches.

=== Seasoning ===
Yakitori seasonings are primarily divided into two types: salty (shio) or salty-sweet (tare). The salty type usually uses plain salt as its main seasoning, though in some parts of Japan, such as Saitama prefecture, it may be accompanied by a spicy miso dipping sauce (karamiso). For the salty-sweet variety, tare, a special glaze consisting of mirin, sake, soy sauce, and sugar is applied after cooking. Other common spices include powdered cayenne pepper, shichimi, Japanese pepper, black pepper, yuzu koshō and wasabi, according to one's tastes.

== Sales ==
Yakitori-ya (焼き鳥屋) are small shops specializing in yakitori. They usually take the form of a compact shop offering take-out services only, but sit-down restaurants and restaurant chains are also popular.

Yakitori is not limited to speciality shops: It is readily found on the menus of izakaya all across Japan and is sold pre-cooked, as frozen vacuum packs, or even canned. The latter was made popular by Hotei Foods Corporation, the first company that started selling yakitori-in-can in 1970, with nine flavors as of 2016. Their TV commercial song has been iconic to their brand name.

Due to its ease of preparation and portability, yakitori is a very popular street food that is often sold from small carts and stalls, known as yatai. Yatai are found, among other places, dotting streets during festivals or on heavily trafficked routes during the evening commute where customers enjoy beer and sake with yakitori.

== Examples ==
Due to a wide diversity in cuts and preparation methods, yakitori takes on many forms. Some popular examples include:

- momo (もも), chicken thigh
- mune (むね), chicken breast
- hasami (はさみ), gizzard and spring onion
- sasami (ささみ), inner breast meat or 'tender'
- negima (ねぎま), chicken and spring onion
- tsukune (つくね), chicken meatballs
- (tori)kawa ((とり)かわ), chicken skin, grilled until crispy
- tebasaki (手羽先), chicken wing
- bonjiri (ぼんじり), chicken tail
- shiro (シロ), pork small intestines
- nankotsu (なんこつ), chicken cartilage
- hāto / hatsu (ハート／ハツ) or kokoro (こころ), chicken heart
- rebā (レバー), liver
- shiro rebā (白レバー) fatty liver
- sunagimo (砂肝) or zuri (ずり), chicken gizzard
- toriniku (鶏肉), all white meat on skewer
- yotsumi (四つ身), pieces of chicken breast
- seseri (せせり), chicken neck meat

== Gallery ==
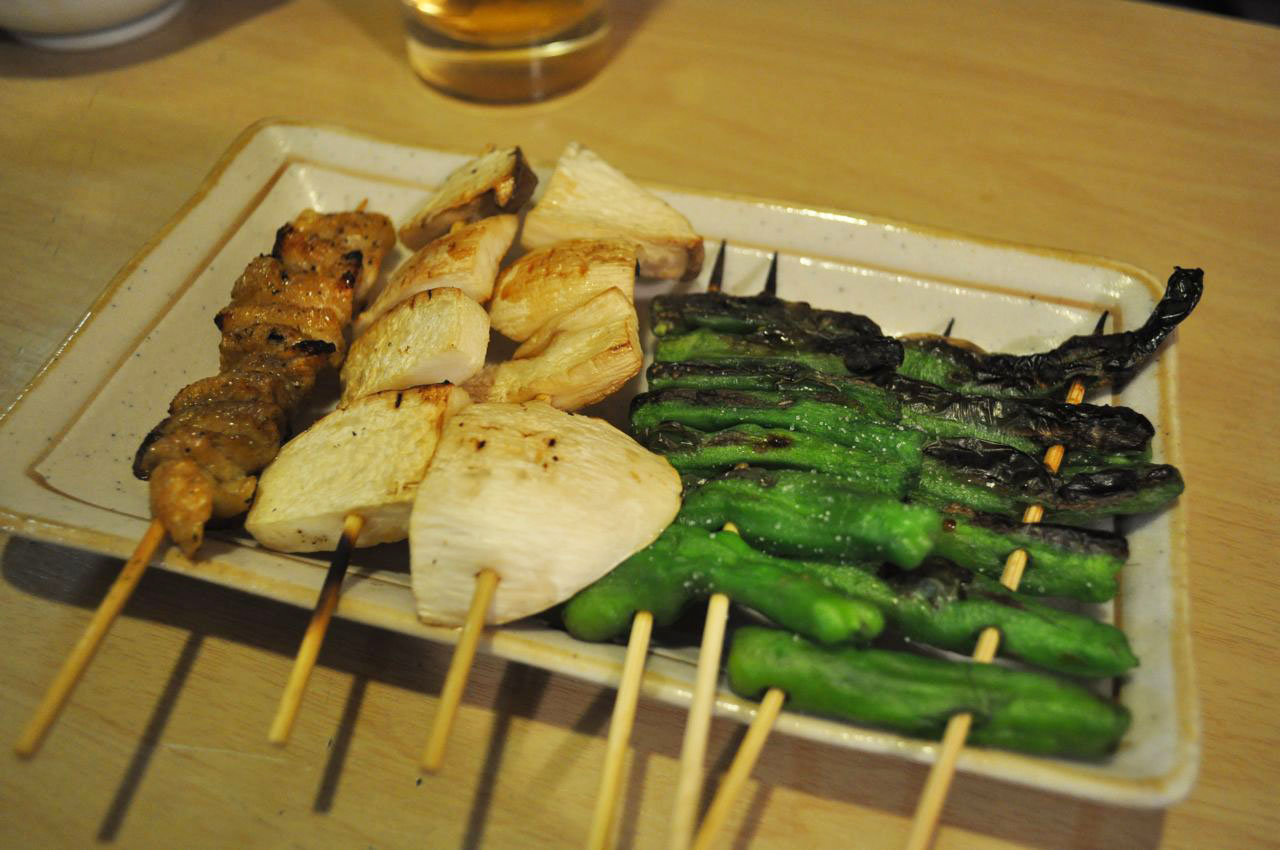
Left to right: Kawa (chicken skin); yamaimo; shishitō

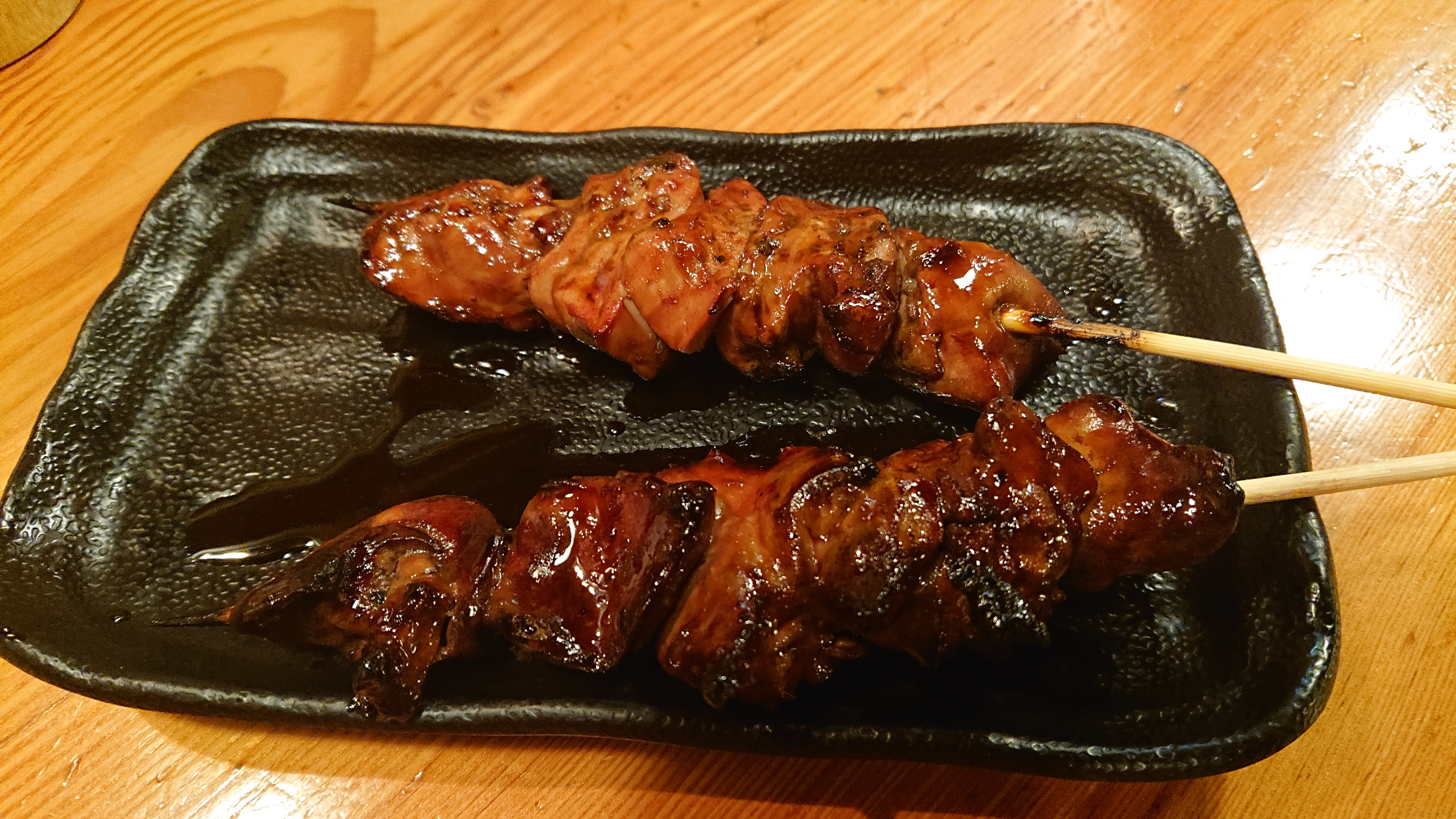
Chicken liver

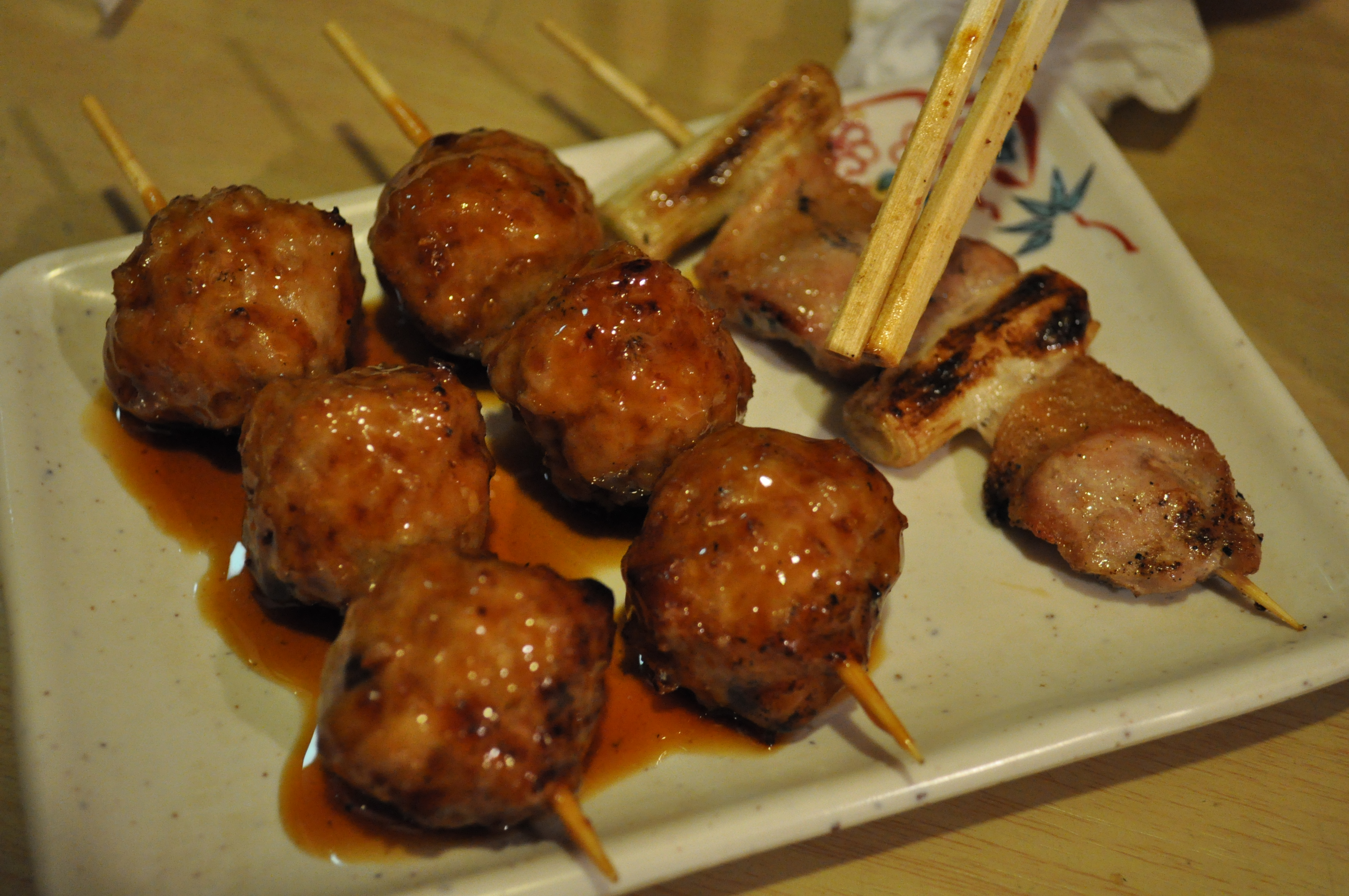
Left to right: Tsukune; negi (scallion) and butabara (pork back ribs)

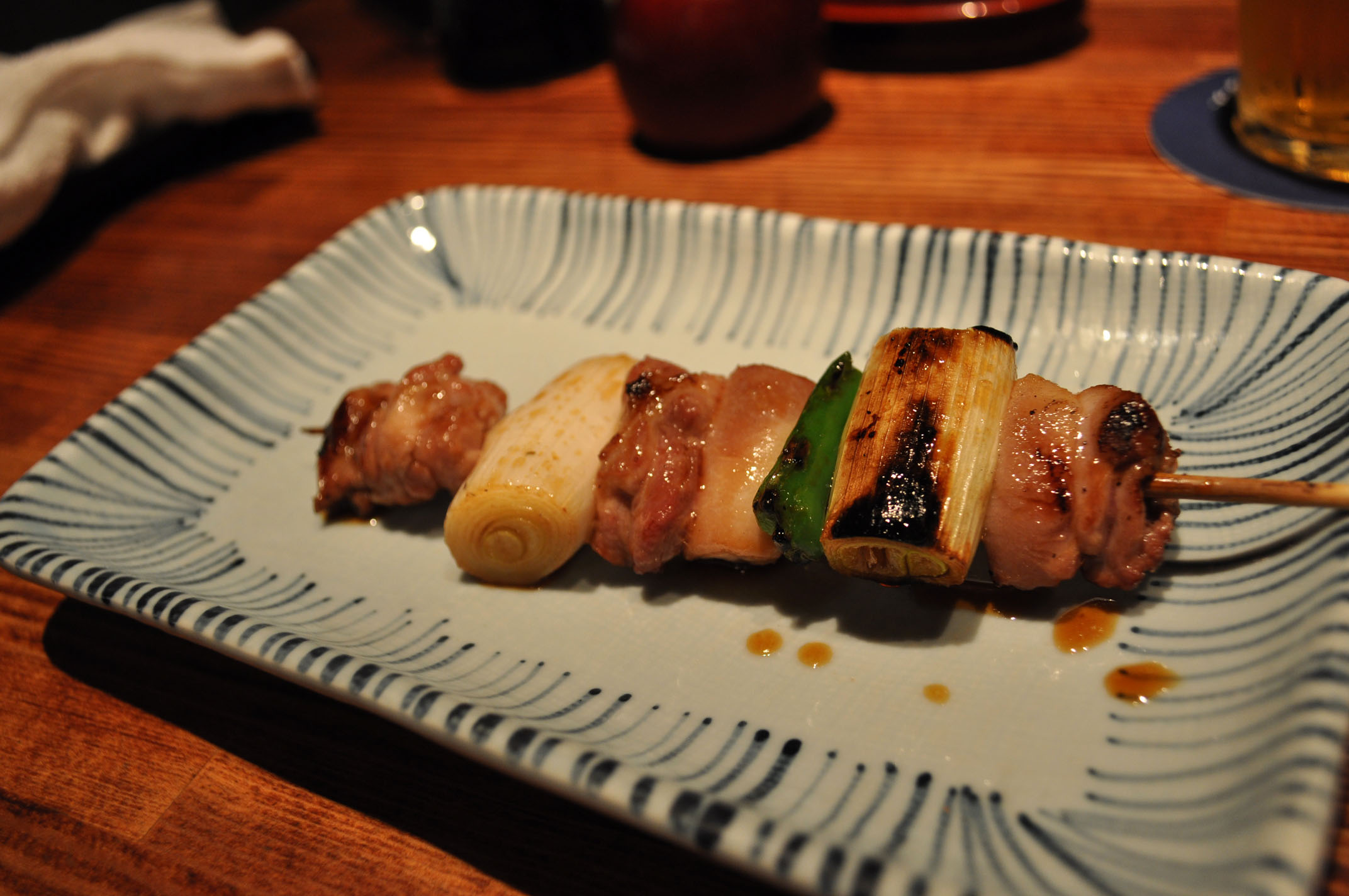
Negima (chicken thigh and scallion)

== See also ==
- Brochette
- Barbecue
- Chuan – China
- Dak-kkochi – Korea
- Japanese cuisine
- List of chicken dishes
- List of kebabs
- Nem nướng – Vietnam
- Satay – Indonesia
- Shashlik – Caucasus and Eastern Europe
- Souvlaki – Greece
