= Skewer =

Thin stick used to hold pieces of food together

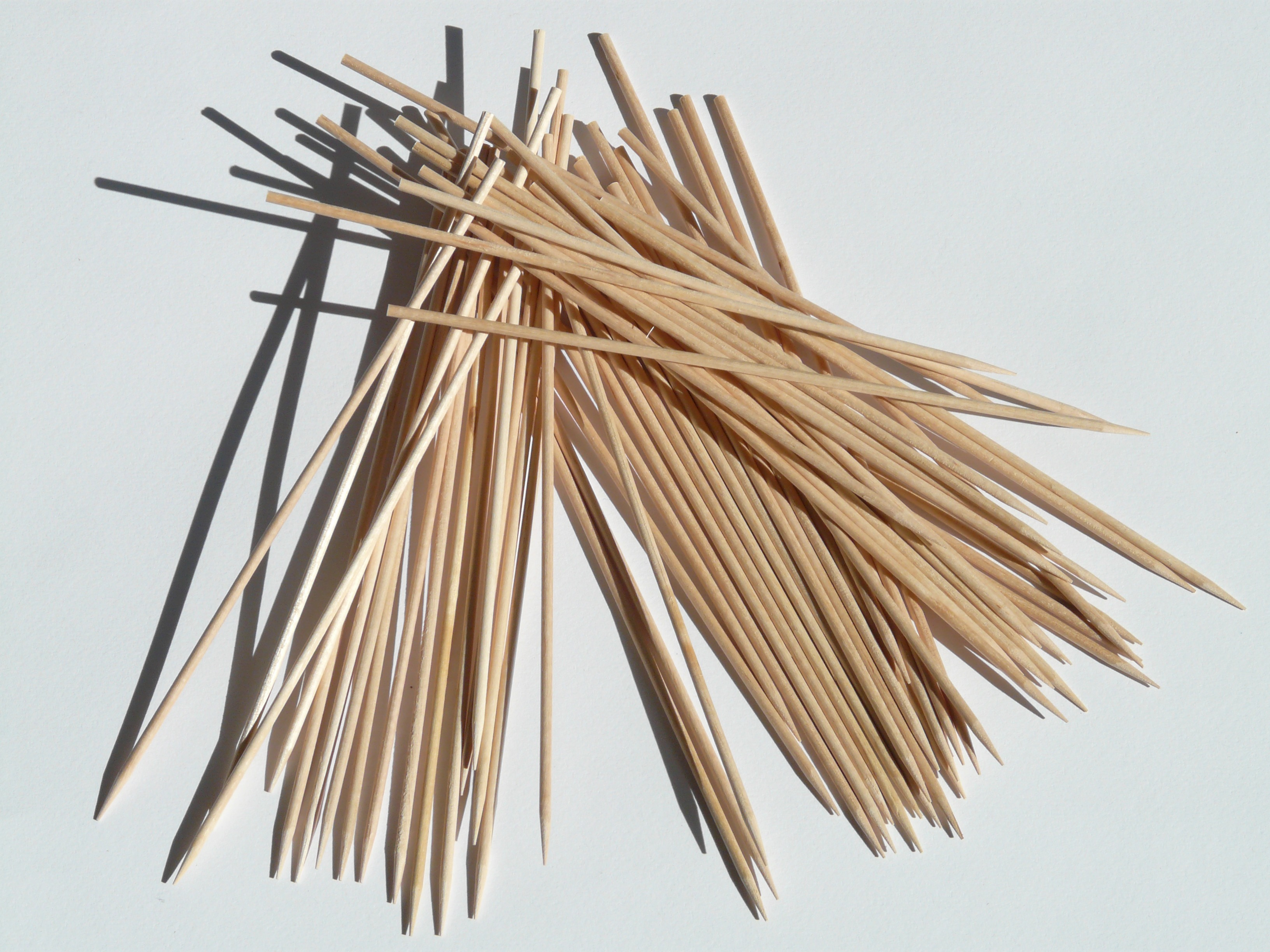
Wooden skewers

A skewer is a thin metal or wood stick used to hold pieces of food together. The word may sometimes be used as a metonym, to refer to the entire food item served on a skewer, as in "chicken skewers". Skewers are used while grilling or roasting meats and fish, and in other culinary applications.

In English, brochette is a borrowing of the French word for skewer. In cookery, en brochette means 'on a skewer', and describes the form of a dish or the method of cooking and serving pieces of food, especially grilled meat or seafood, on skewers; for example "lamb cubes en brochette". Skewers are often used in a variety of kebab dishes.

== Utensil ==
Metal skewers are typically stainless steel rods with a pointed tip on one end and a grip of some kind on the other end for ease of removing the food. Non-metallic skewers are often made from bamboo, as well as hardwoods such as birch, beech, or other suitable wood. Prior to grilling, wooden skewers may be soaked in water to avoid burning. A related device is the rotisserie or spit, a large rod that rotates meat while it cooks.

== History ==
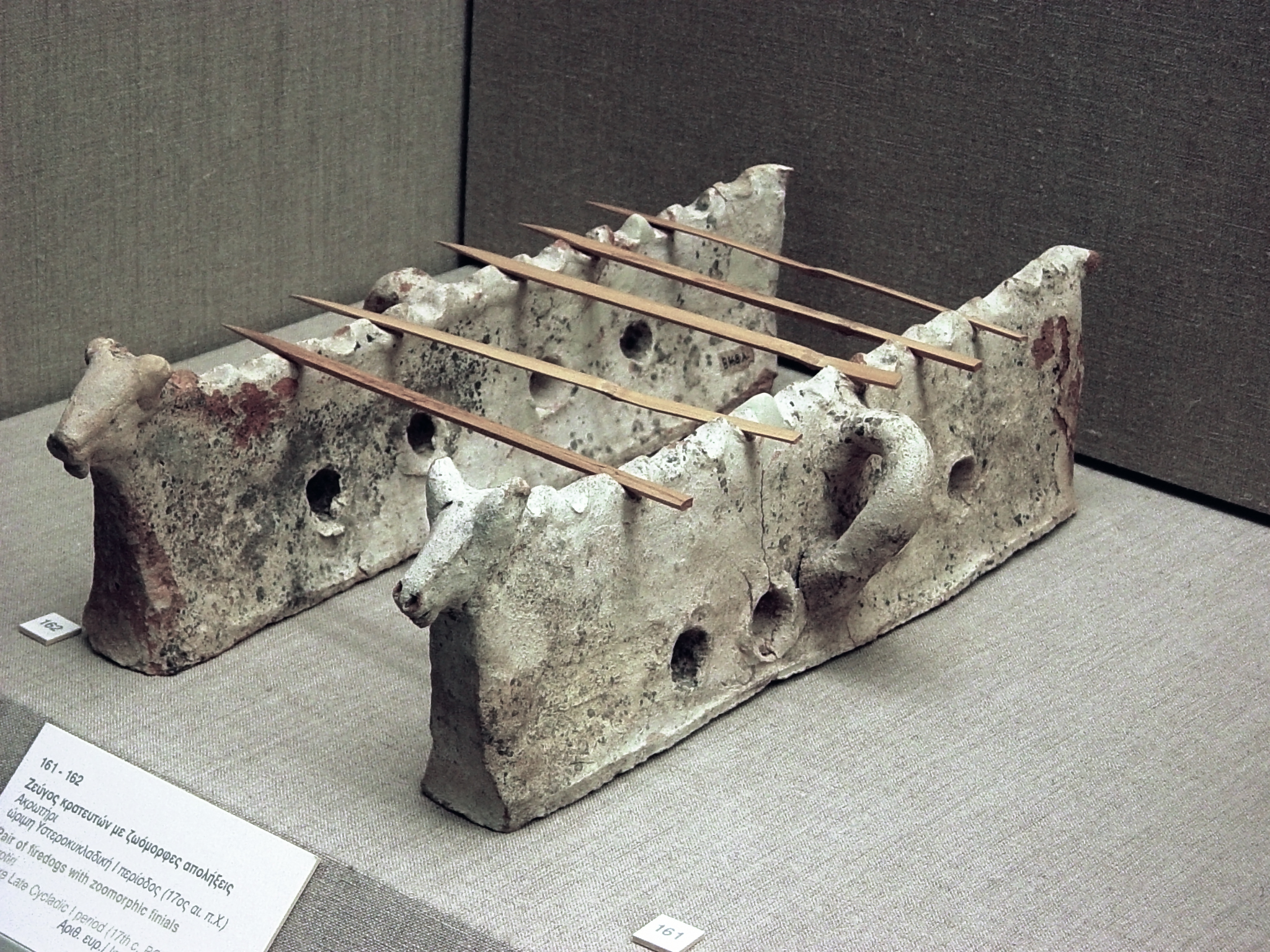
Pair of Minoan firedogs, 17th century BCE

At the 300,000-year-old Schöningen site in Germany, a stick with a burnt tip was suggested to have been used to cook meat over a fire, though later scholars have questioned this interpretation. Excavations of the Minoan settlement of Akrotiri unearthed stone "fire dogs" used before the 17th century BCE. In these supports there are pairs of indentations that may have been used for holding skewers. Homer in Iliad (1.465) mentions pieces of meat roasted on spits (ὀβελός, obelós). In Classical Greece, a small spit or skewer was known as ὀβελίσκος (obeliskos), and Aristophanes mentions such skewers being used to roast thrushes. The story is often told of medieval Middle Eastern soldiers - usually Turkish or Persian, depending on the storyteller – who cooked meat skewered on their swords.

One of the most well-known skewered foods around the world is the shish kebab. The earliest literary evidence for the Turkish word şiş (shish) as a food utensil comes from the 11th-century Diwan Lughat al-Turk, attributed to Mahmud of Kashgar. He defines shish as both a skewer and 'tool for arranging noodles' (minzam tutmaj), though he is unique in this regard as all subsequent known historical references to shish define it as a skewer.

== Examples of skewered foods ==
=== Kebab ===
A large variety of dishes cooked on skewers are kebabs (meat dishes prevalent in Middle Eastern cuisine and the Muslim world), or derived from them. Examples include Turkish shish kebab, Iranian jujeh kabab, Chinese chuan, and Southeast Asian satay. However, kebab is not synonymous with "skewered food", and many kebab dishes such as chapli kebab are not cooked on skewers. On the other hand, English speakers may sometimes use the word kebab to refer to any food on a skewer.

=== Other ===
Dishes, other than kebabs, prepared with skewers include American city chicken and corn dog, Brazilian churrasco, indigenous Peruvian anticucho, Indonesian satay, Italian arrosticini, Greek souvlaki, Japanese kushiyaki and kushikatsu, Korean jeok and kkochi, Nepali sekuwa, Portuguese espetada, Serbian ražnjići, Vietnamese nem nướng and chạo tôm, Chinese shaokao, and Malaysian-Singaporean Lok-lok.

Appetizers and hors d'oeuvres may often be skewered together with small sticks or toothpicks; the Spanish pincho is named after such a skewer. Small, often decorative, skewers of glass, metal, wood or bamboo known as olive picks or cocktail sticks are used for garnishes on cocktails and other alcoholic beverages. Many types of snack food, such as candy apples, bananacue, ginanggang, elote, telur gulung, and tanghulu, are sold and served "on a stick" or skewer, especially at outdoor markets, fairs, and sidewalk or roadside stands around the world.

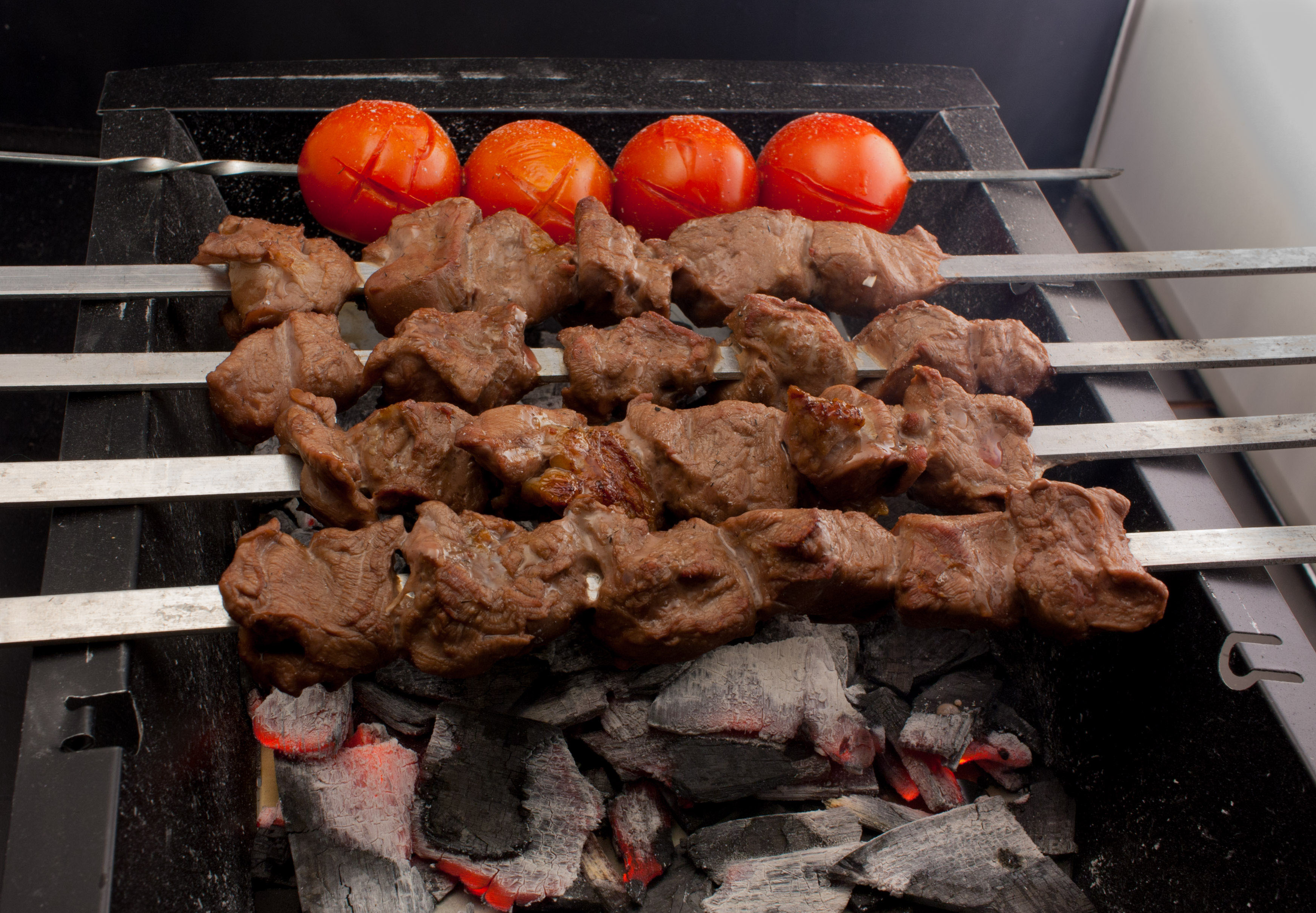
Chenjeh kebab in Iran

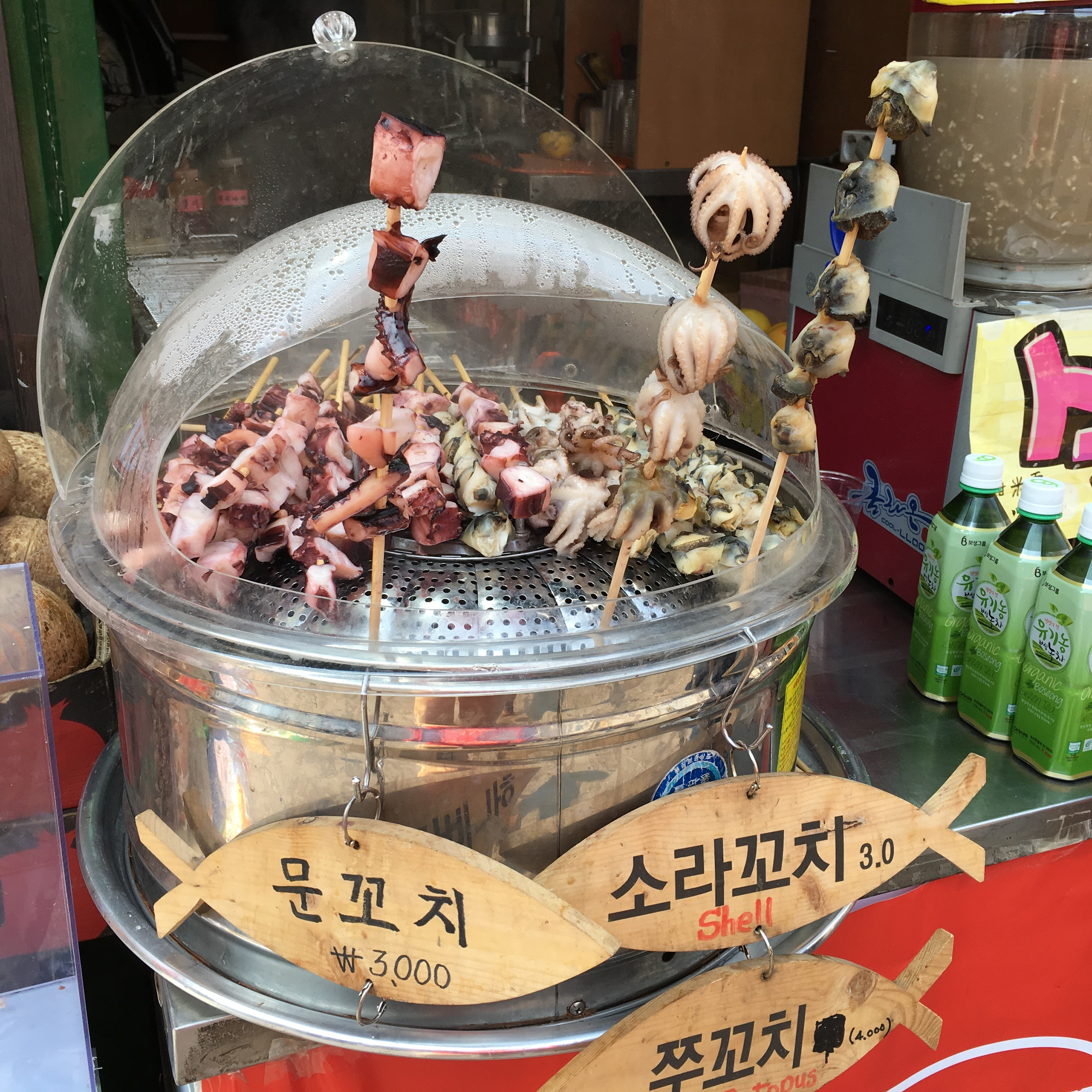
Seafood skewers sold in South Korea: mun-kkochi (giant octopus), sora-kkochi (horned turban), and jju-kkochi (webfoot octopus).

Fish ball skewers at Shida Night Market in Taipei, Taiwan

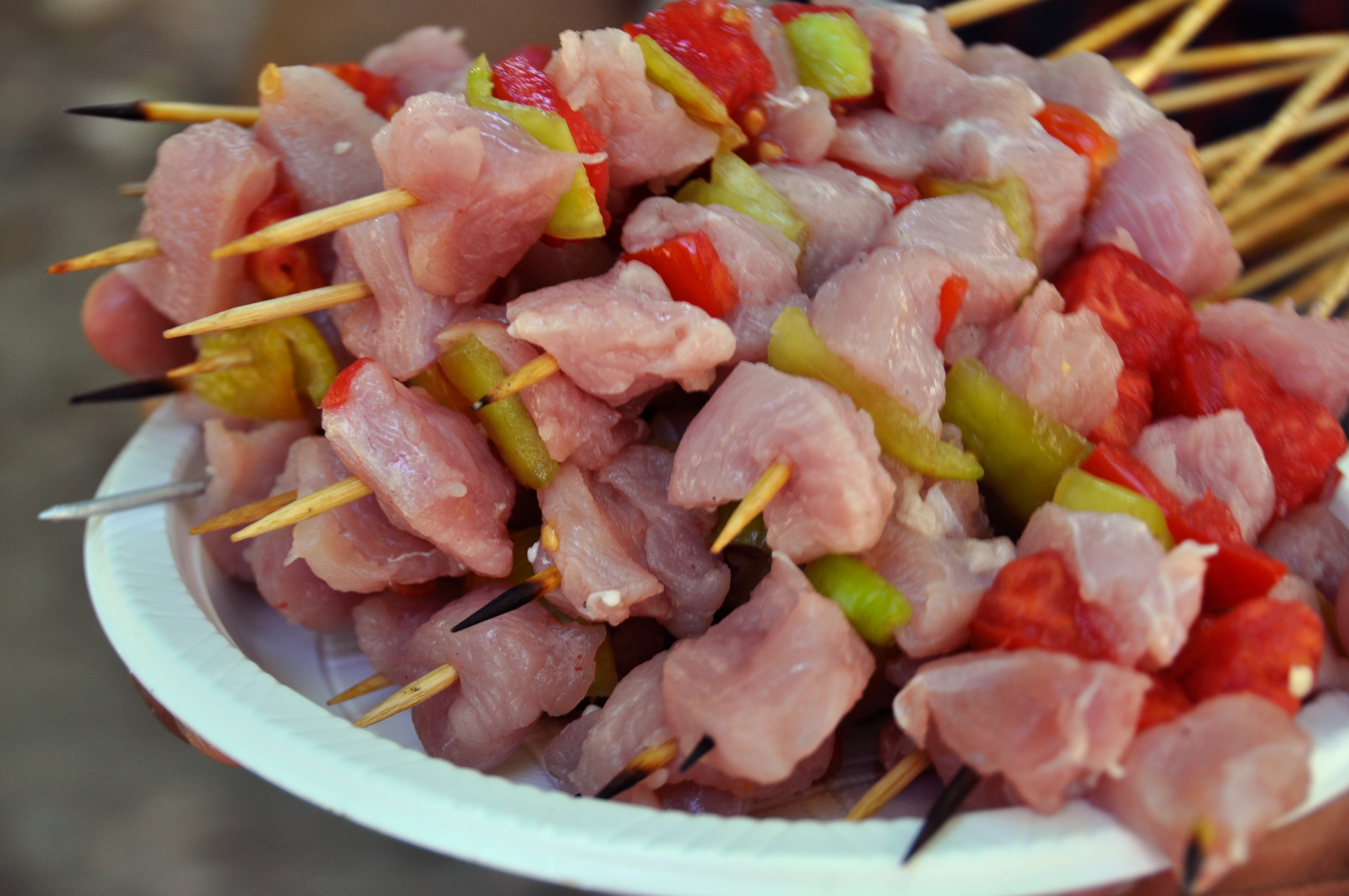
Turkey skewer on a plate from Algeria

== See also ==
- Barbecue
- Mixed grill
