= Jujeh kabab =

Persian chicken kebab

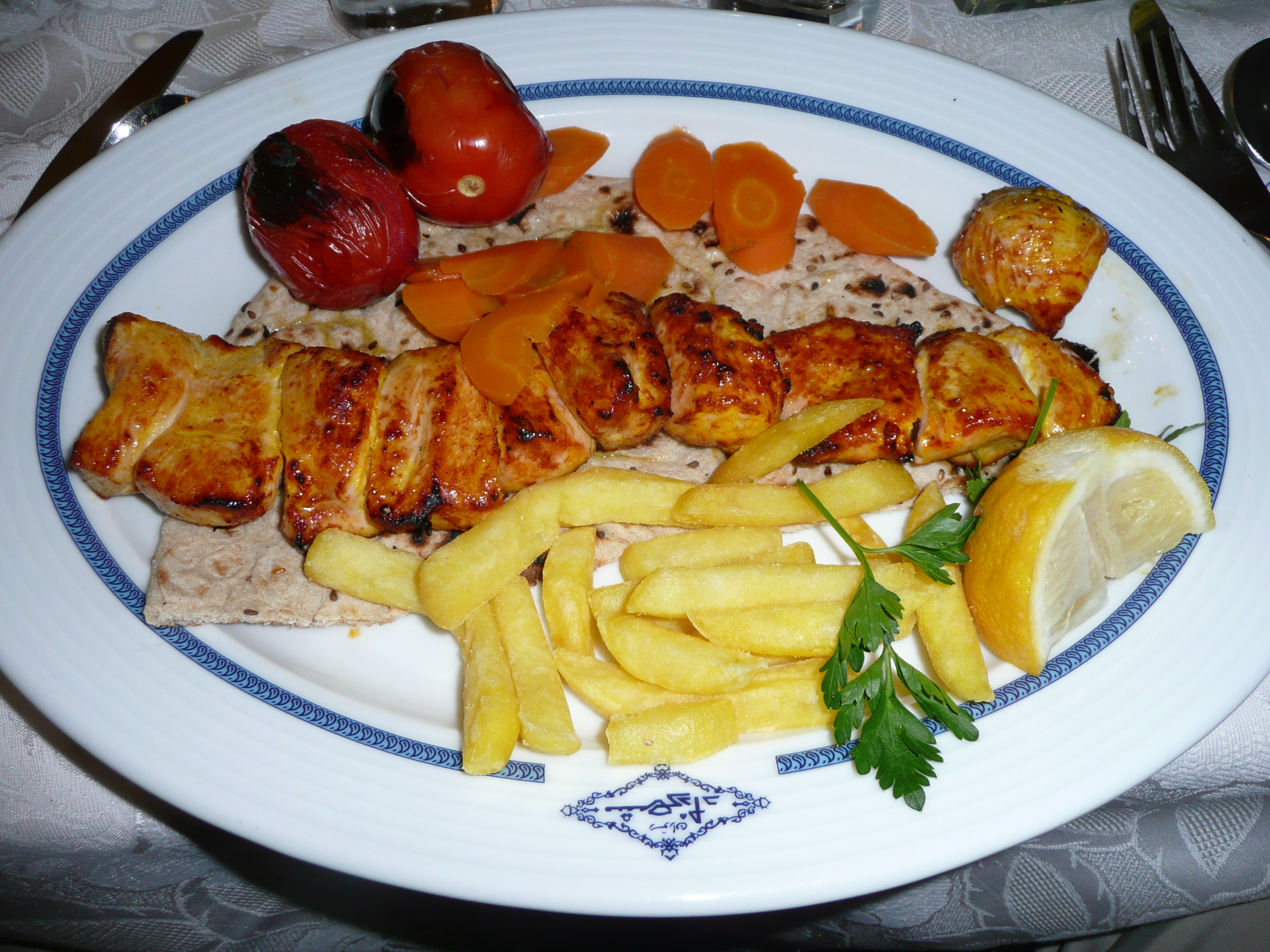
Iranian Jūje-kabāb, along with lemon, grilled tomatoes, baked carrot, French fries, and bread

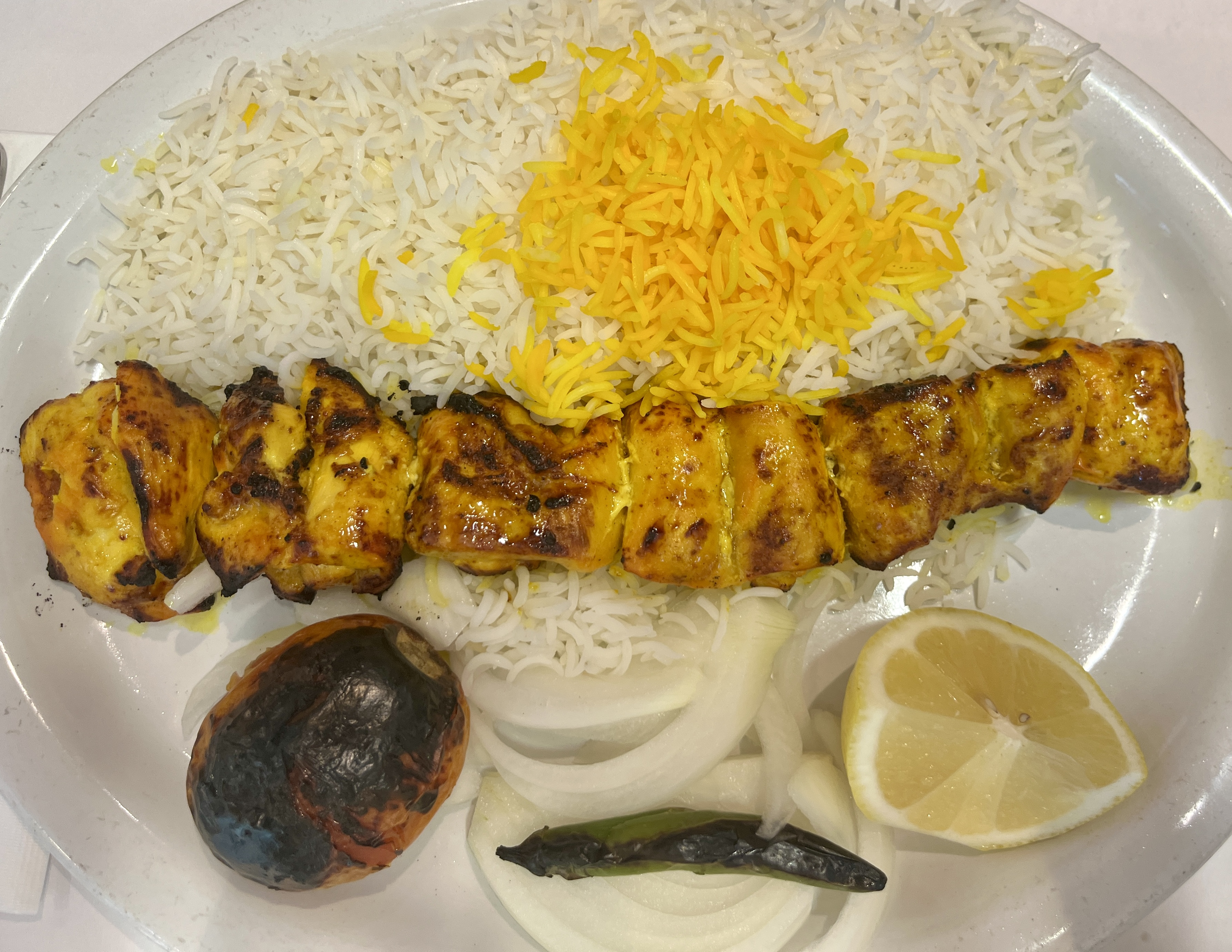
Jujeh Kabab rice

Jujeh kabab (Persian: جوجه‌ کباب) is a Persian dish that consists of grilled chunks of chicken which are sometimes with bone and other times without bone. It is one of the most common and popular dishes of Iran. It is common to marinate the chunks in minced onion, lemon juice and saffron.

It is sometimes spelled as Joojeh kabab. Often served on chelo rice or wrapped in lavash bread, both of which are staples in the Persian cuisine. The former is more often served in restaurants and elaborate parties such as wedding receptions while the latter is often eaten in domestic settings, kebab joints and picnics or packed for road trips. Other optional components include grilled tomatoes, peppers (grilled or raw), fresh lemons or other vegetables.

== See also ==
- Shish kebab
- Shish taouk
