= Shish taouk =

Chicken dish

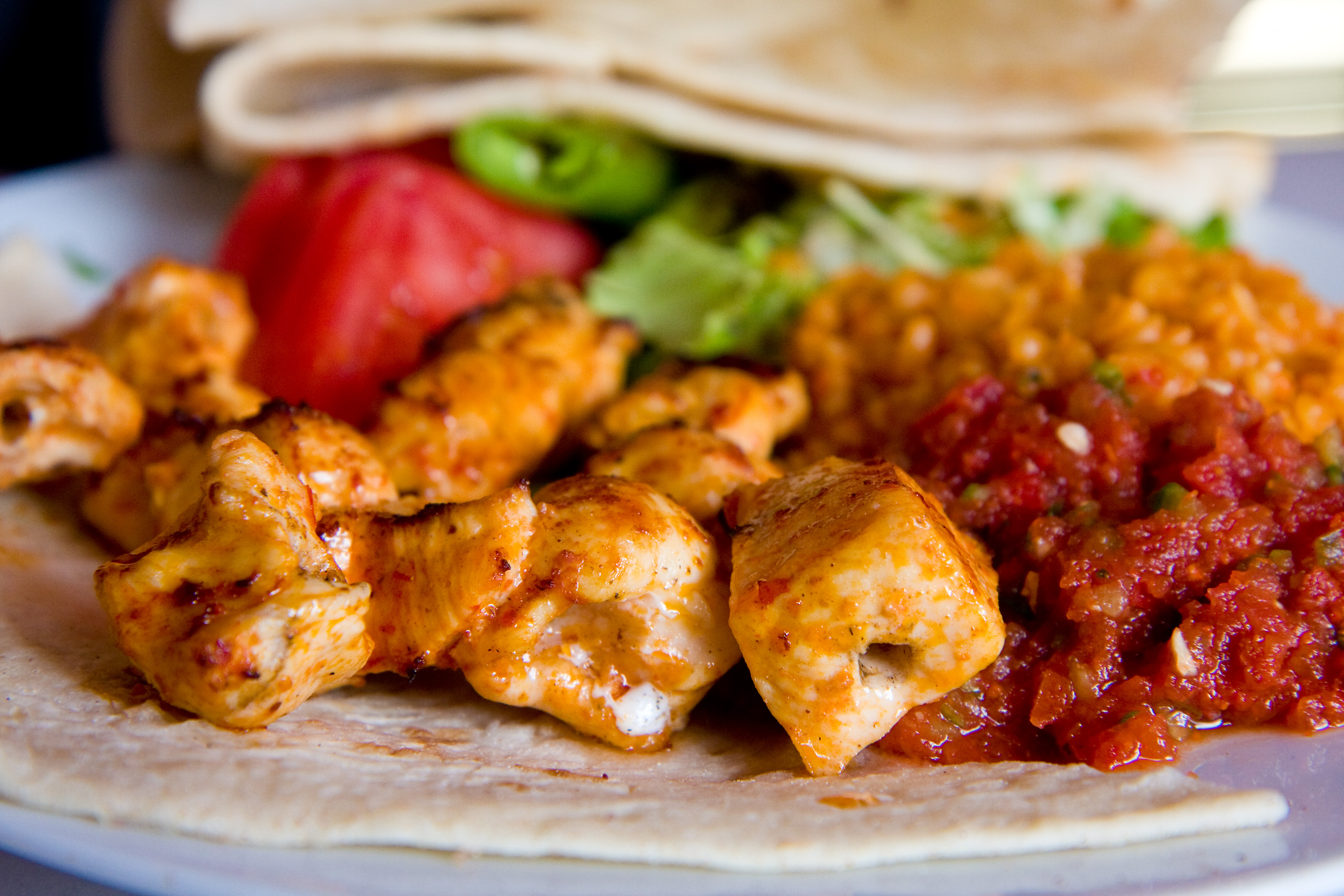
- Shish taouk
- Type: Kebab
- Place of origin: Ottoman Empire
- Associated cuisine: Ottoman cuisine
- Main ingredients: Chicken

Shish taouk or shish tawook (Arabic: شيش طاووق; Turkish: tavuk şiş) is a marinated chicken shish kebab of Arab, Armenian and Turkish cuisine and that has become part of broader Middle Eastern and Caucasian cuisine. Shish taouk is served in many kebab houses.

== Etymology ==
Shish (Levantine Arabic: شيش) in Syrian-Arabic dialects or şiş in Turkish means skewer. The word sish comes from the Turkish word şiş. It evolved from the Old Turkish word sış, meaning "pointed stick". It has been adopted in Egyptian Arabic, Lebanese-Arabic and Syrian-Arabic dialects. Tavuk (Levantine Arabic: طاووق, pronounced [taˈvuk]) comes from old Turkic takagu and means chicken.

== Preparation ==
The dish consists of cubes of chicken that are marinated, then skewered and grilled. Common marinades are based upon yogurt and lemon juice or tomato puree, though there are other variations.

== Methods of serving ==
The dish is eaten either as a sandwich or on a platter with vegetables, sometimes with rice or French fries. The Turkish cuisine version is generally served with rice, yogurt, cucumber salad and skewer-grilled vegetables. The Syrian and Lebanese version is usually served with toum (a garlic paste sauce), hummus and tabbouleh. The sandwich version comes generally in a flatbread or as a dürüm, and frequently accompanied by lettuce, tomatoes, and pickled turnips.

== See also ==
- List of Middle Eastern dishes
- List of chicken dishes
- List of kebabs
- Falafel
- Kafta
