= Sausage sandwich =

Sandwich containing cooked sausage

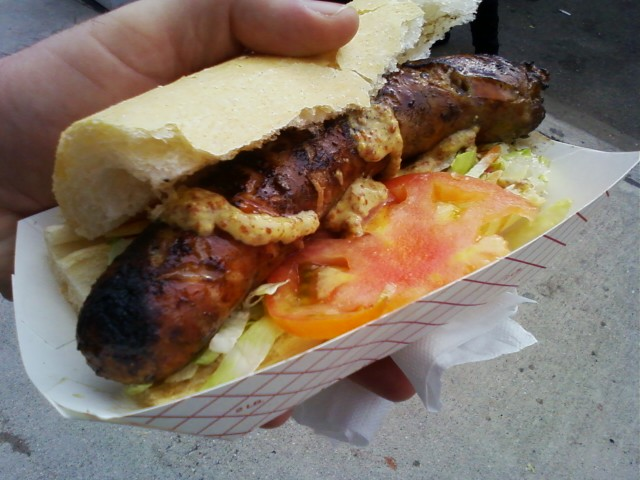
- Sausage sandwich served in New Orleans

A sausage sandwich is a sandwich containing cooked sausage. It may consist of an oblong bread roll such as a baguette or ciabatta roll, and sliced or whole links of sausage, such as hot or sweet Italian sausage, Polish sausage, German sausage (knackwurst, weisswurst, bratwurst, bockwurst), North African merguez, andouille or chorizo. Popular toppings include mustard, brown sauce, ketchup, barbecue sauce, steak sauce, peppers, onions, sauerkraut, chili, and salsa.

== United Kingdom ==
In the UK, sausage sandwiches ("sausage sarnie" or "butty" in English slang, or "piece 'n' sausage" in Scottish English) can typically be found in British cafes and roadside food stalls.

Although a breakfast favourite, it may be purchased and consumed at any time of the day. Popular combinations are sausage and bacon, sausage and egg, sausage and fried onions, and sausage and tomato.

Sausages are often served in a bread roll, finger roll or in colloquial and everyday language a hot dog bun, especially at barbecues. In the North East they are often served in a stottie cake.

In Scotland, a Lorne sausage may be substituted and is usually served in a morning roll or bap.

== Ireland ==
In Ireland, large amounts of Tomato ketchup may be added in order to enhance the flavour of the sandwich, however other sauces may also be used.

== Australia and New Zealand ==
In Australia and New Zealand, a variety is frequently sold at school fêtes and other fundraising activities. The sausage is cooked on a barbecue grill in an outdoor area and served with grilled onions on a single, folded slice of bread with tomato or barbecue sauce. The activity is commonly known as a "sausage sizzle". As well as fêtes, fundraisers and markets, in recent years it has become common for "sausage sizzles" to be regularly held outside major retailers on weekends (often for charitable causes) such as Bunnings, The Warehouse or Harvey Norman. Sausage sizzles organised by community groups are also common at election polling places, where sausage sandwiches are colloquially known as "democracy sausages".

In the majority of states of Australia, such as New South Wales, Queensland, and Western Australia, the sausages sold in a single piece of bread at a sausage sizzle are known as 'sausage sandwiches'. However, elsewhere, such as Tasmania, Victoria and South Australia, these are known as 'sausage in bread' and a sausage sandwich refers to a sandwich made with two slices of bread, a chopped up sausage (often cold), and tomato sauce or chutney.

== South Africa ==
In South Africa, a common variety is known as a boerewors roll or, colloquially, a "boerie". Similar to the Oceanic variety, the sausage is cooked on a braai (barbecue) grill, and usually served with grilled onions on a hot dog-style bread roll with tomato ketchup or barbecue sauce, chutney or sweet chili sauce.

== United States ==
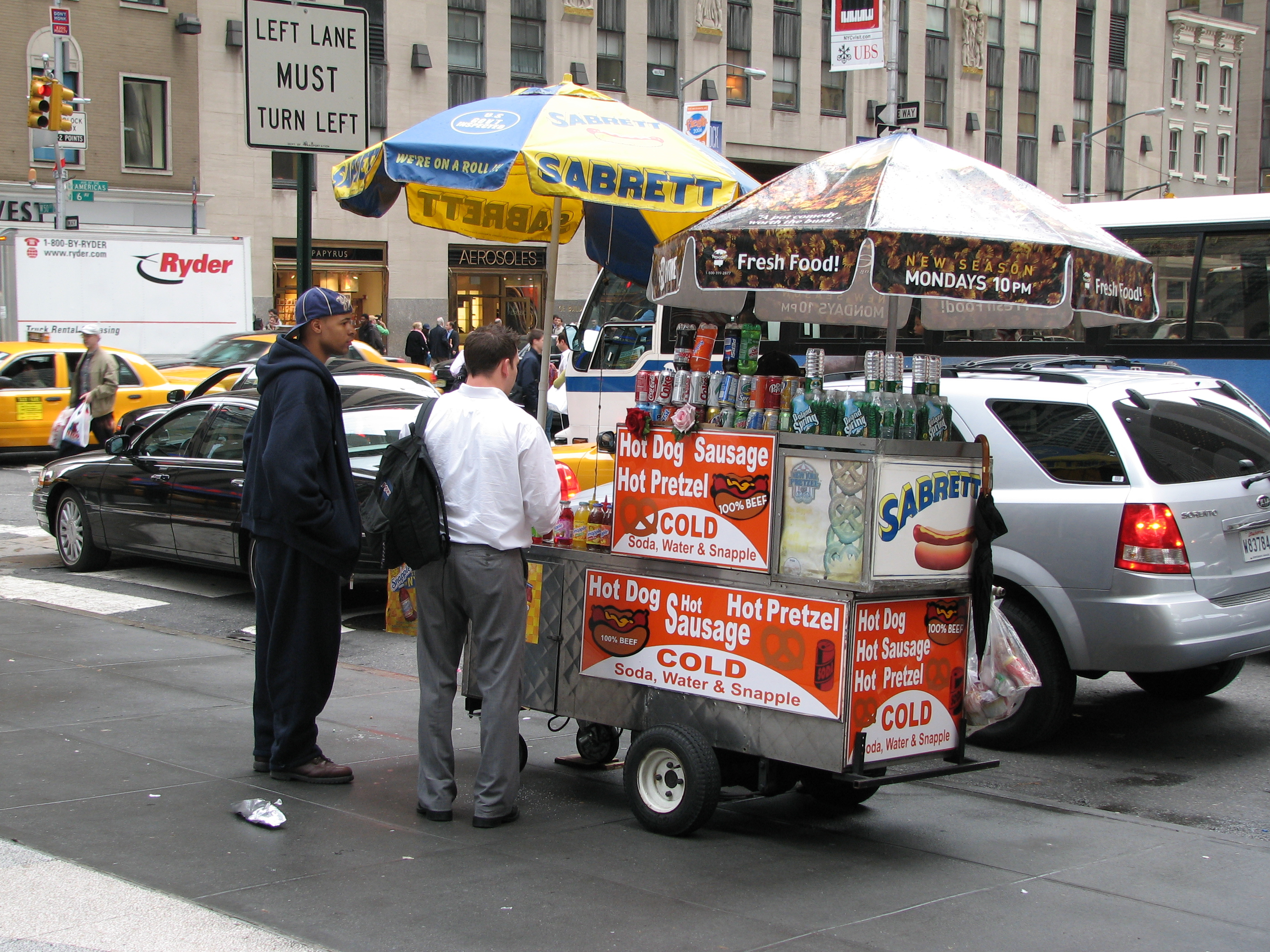
Vendor selling sausage sandwiches

In the United States, sausage sandwiches are widely popular. One variety, colloquially known as a hot dog, is particularly popular, especially at sporting events, carnivals, beaches, and fairs. They are also sold in many delis as well as food stands on street corners of large cities. Many American hot dog vendors also serve Polish, Italian, Mexican, and German (e.g. bratwurst) sausage sandwiches in addition to their regular fare.

Sausage sandwiches that come on toast, a bagel, an English muffin, a biscuit, or kaiser roll are generally referred to as breakfast sandwiches.

== Germany ==
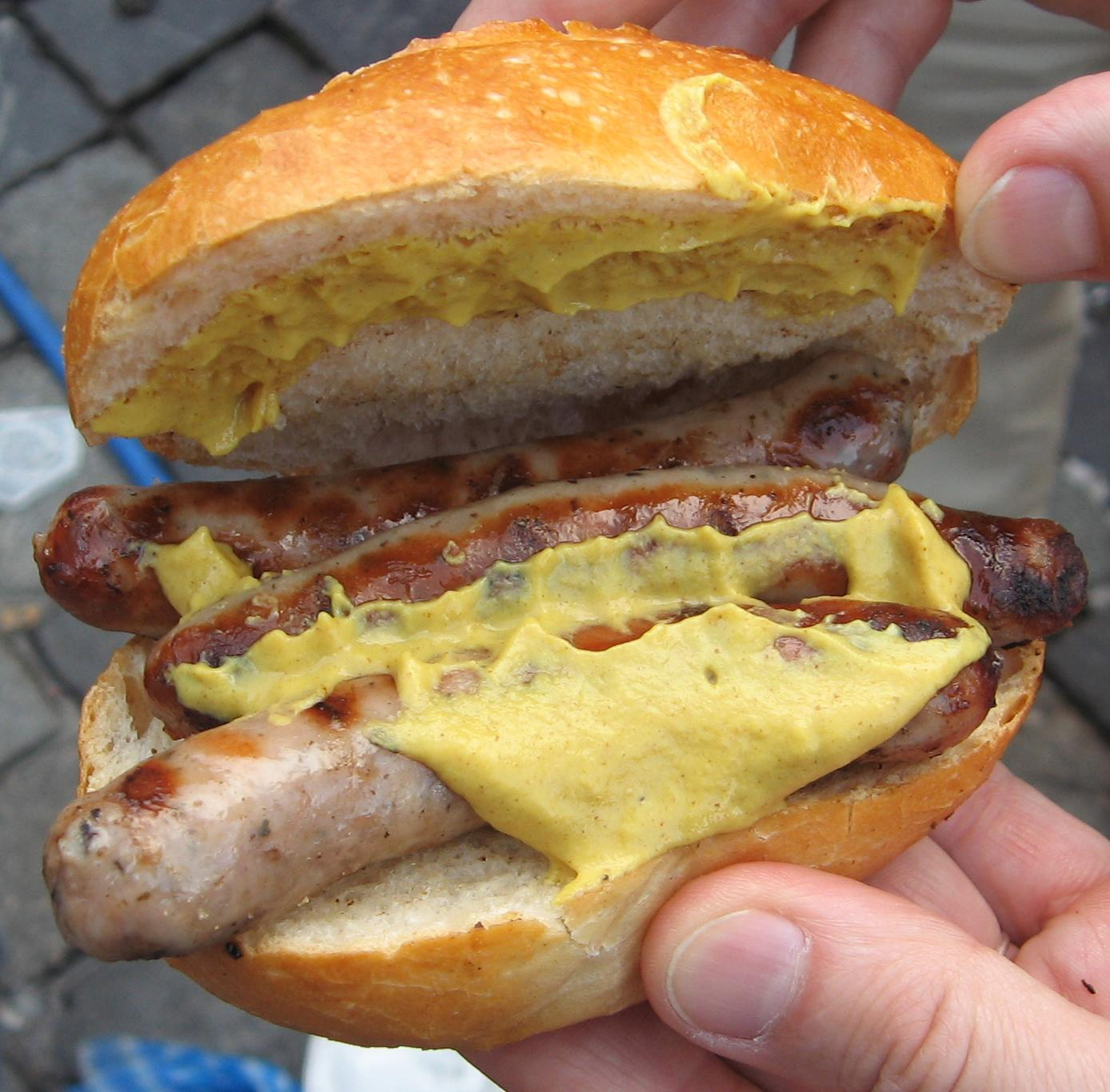
Drei im Weggla

A sausage sandwich called Drei im Weckla (literally three in a bun; also spelled Drei im Weggla) has three Nürnberger Rostbratwürste, as the snack's name implies, and mustard, in a sliced bread roll.

== See also ==
- Bacon butty
- Breakfast roll
- Choripán
- Submarine sandwich
- Steak sandwich
- Maxwell Street Polish
- List of sandwiches
