= Regional variations of barbecue =

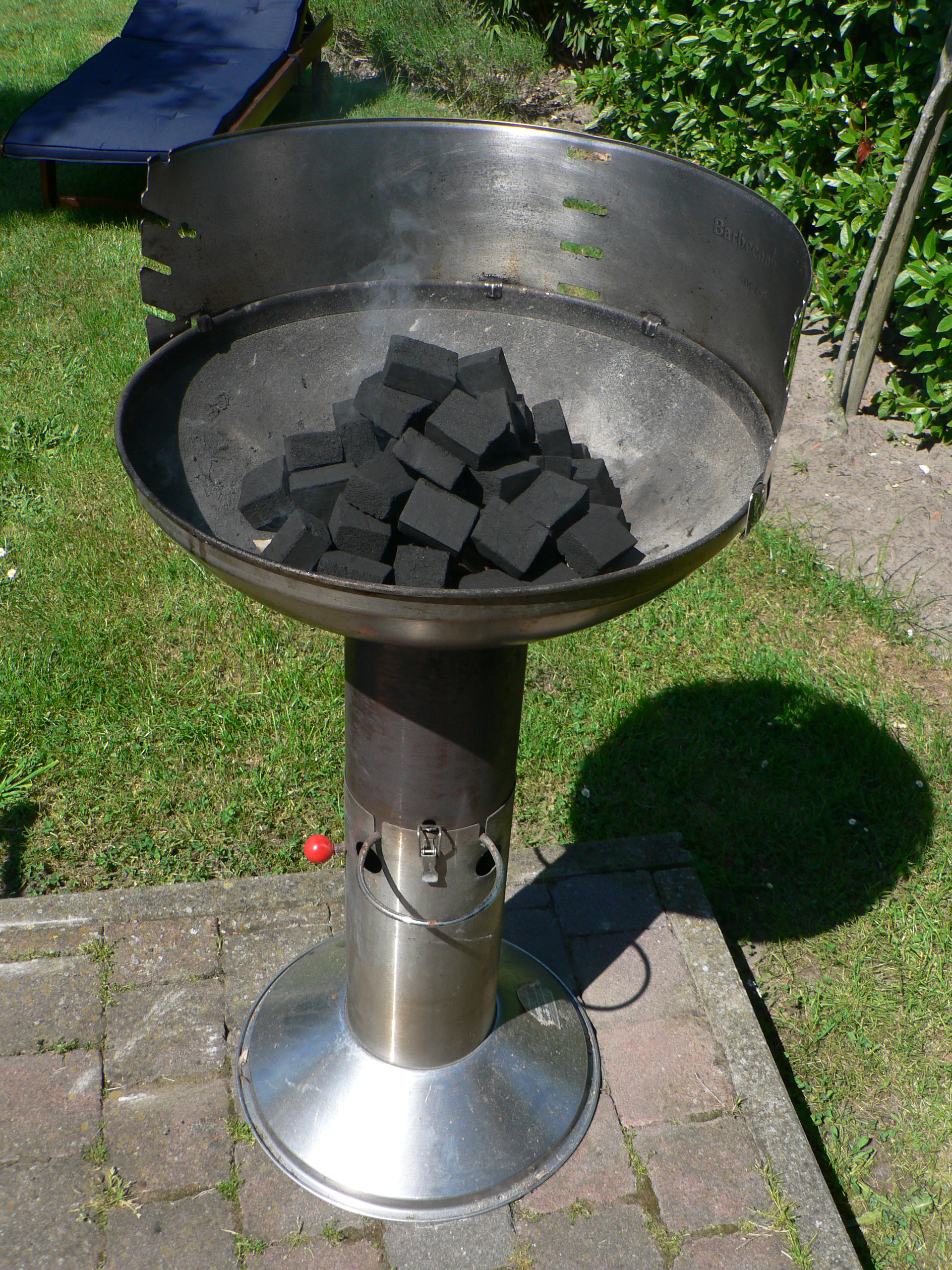
Briquettes placed in a barbecue cooker

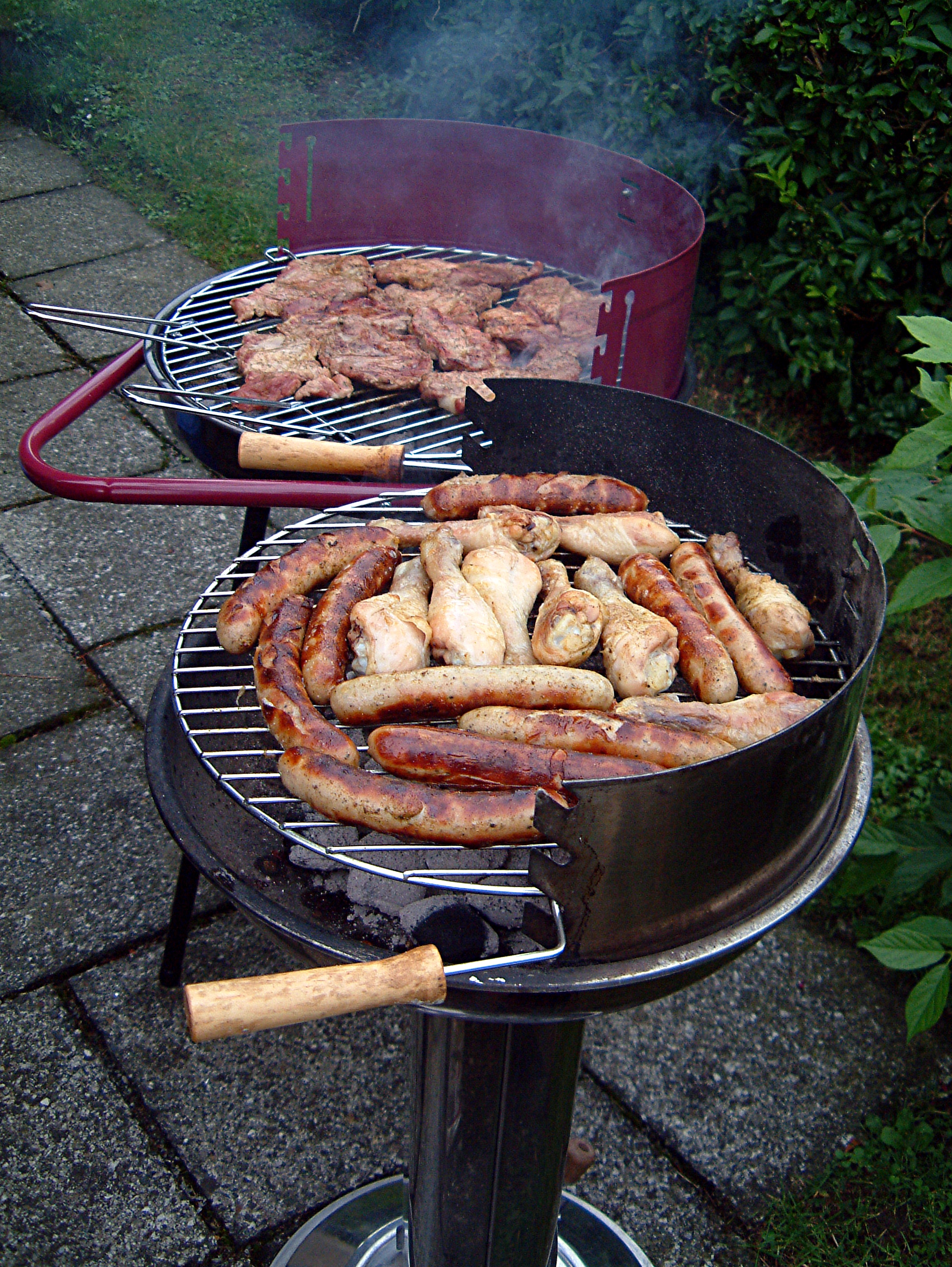
Various meats being barbecued

Barbecue varies by the type of meat, sauce, rub, or other flavorings used, the point in barbecuing at which they are added, the role smoke plays, the equipment and fuel used, cooking temperature, and cooking time.

The meat may be whole, ground (for hamburgers), or processed into sausage or kebabs. The meat may be marinated or rubbed with spices before cooking, basted with a sauce or oil before, during or after cooking, or any combination of these.

== Africa ==
=== South Africa ===
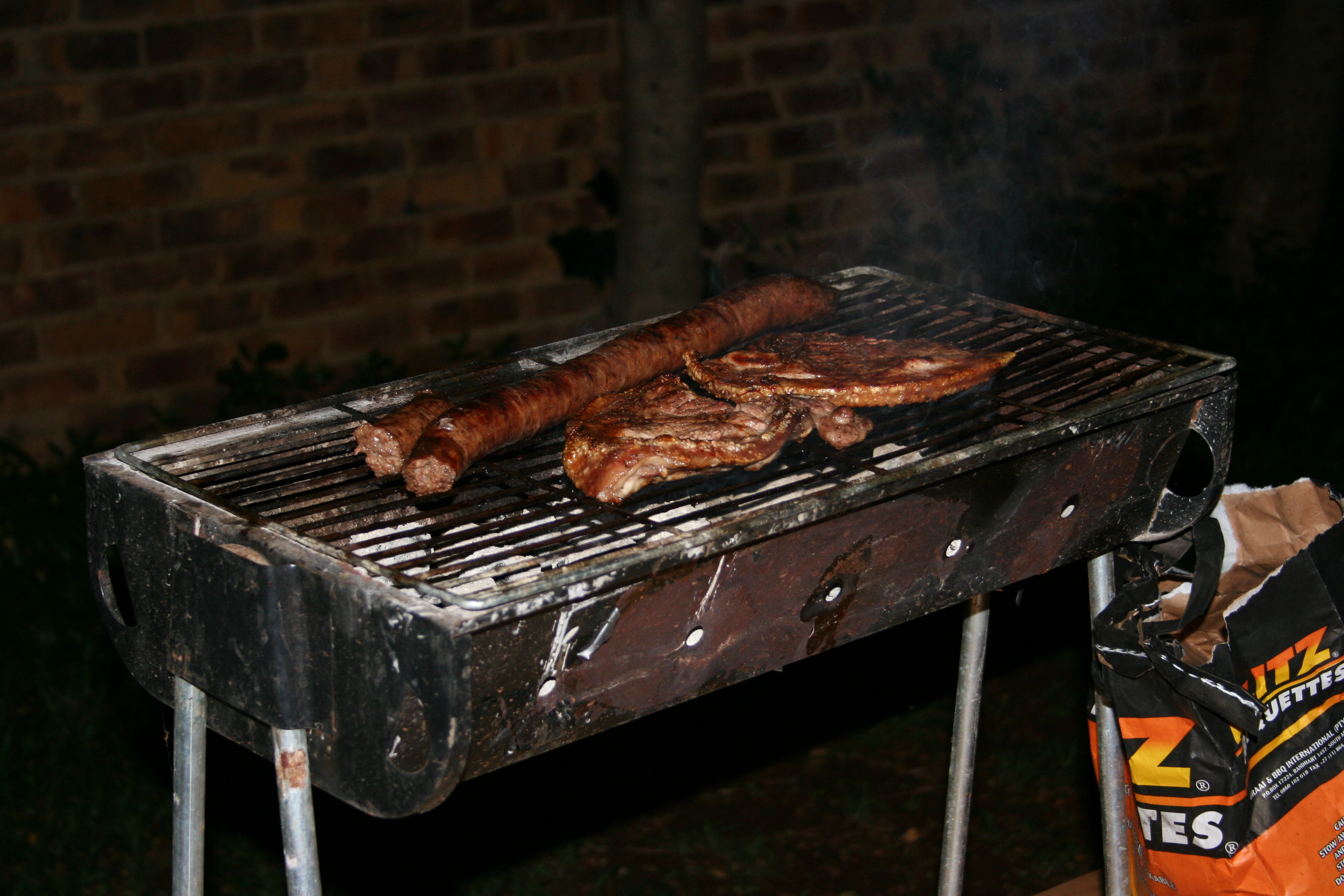
A typical braai on a small braai stand

In South Africa, a braai (plural braais) is a barbecue or grill and is a social custom in much of Southern Africa. The term originated with the Afrikaners, but has since been adopted by South Africans of many ethnic backgrounds. The Afrikaans word braaivleis (English: /ˈbraɪfleɪs/; Afrikaans pronunciation: [ˈbraːifləis]) means grilled meat. The word vleis is Afrikaans for meat, cognate with English flesh.

Braai is regarded by some as another word for barbecue, in that it serves as a verb when describing how food is cooked and a noun when describing the cooking equipment, such as a grill. The traditions around a braai can be considerably different from a barbecue, even if the method of food preparation is very similar. While wood was formerly the most widely used braai fuel, in modern times the use of charcoal, briquettes and gas (gas braai) has increased due to their convenience, as with barbecues elsewhere in the world. There has, however, been a renewed interest in the use of wood after the South African government started its invasive plant species removal programme. Many households now own both a gas and wood or charcoal braai. A portable charcoal or wood braai is called a braai stand.

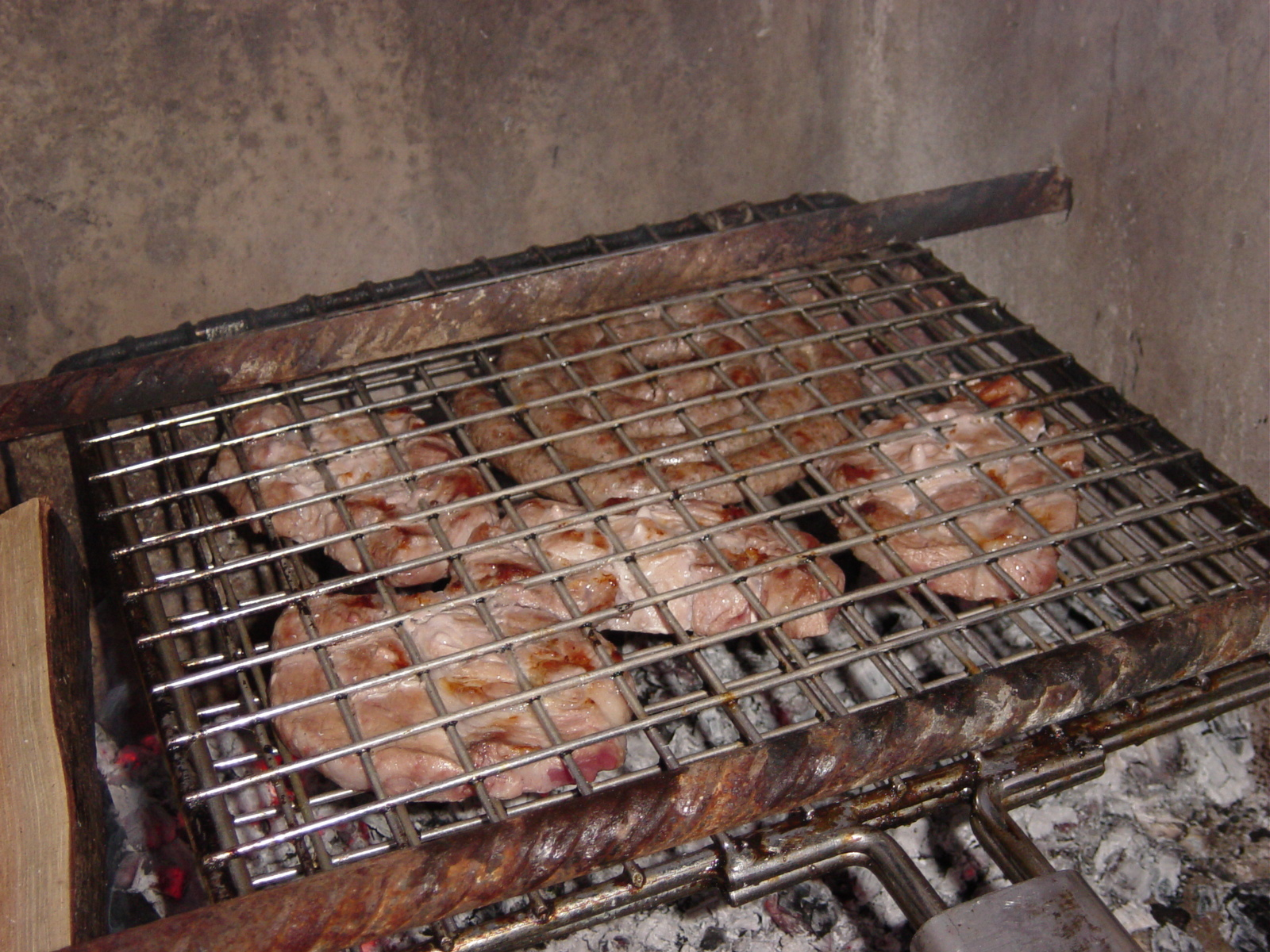
Boerewors and pork in a concrete braai structure

Similar to a potluck party, braais are casual and relaxed social events where families and friends convene at a picnic spot or someone's home (normally the garden or veranda) with their own meat, salad, or side dish in hand. A braai typically includes boerewors, sosaties, kebabs, marinated chicken, pork and lamb chops, steaks, sausages of different flavors and thickness, and possibly even racks of spareribs.

Fish and rock lobster, commonly called crayfish, are also popular in coastal areas, particularly on the west and southwest coasts, and prawns are also braaied.

"Bring-and-braai" is a braai to which guests bring food (usually including meat) and drinks (in other braais, the host usually organises the meat and guests contribute side dishes and drinks).

The other main part of the meal in some regions of the country is pap (/ˈpʌp/). Pap is made from finely ground corn/maize and may be eaten with a tomato and onion sauce, a monkey gland sauce, or a more spicy chakalaka at a braai.

Sometimes this activity is also known as a dop en tjop (dop being Afrikaans slang for an alcoholic drink, literally meaning "cap" or "bottle top", and tjop being the informal Afrikaans term for lamb chop) when significant amounts of alcohol are involved.

A braai is a social occasion that has specific traditions and social norms. The meal is subsequently eaten outside by the braai stand, since these gatherings are normally hosted during the long summer months.

General Motors South Africa used the term braai in the 1970s in its localized jingle "Braaivleis, rugby, sunny skies, and Chevrolet" to advertise their cars in South Africa—equivalent to the slogan "baseball, hot dogs, apple pie, and Chevrolet" in the US and, to a lesser extent, "football, meat pies, kangaroos & Holden Cars" used in Australia.

==== Shisa nyama ====
Shisa nyama, also spelled chisa nyama or chesa nyama, is a term used in many townships to describe a barbecue or braai where friends or families come together to grill meat over an open fire (usually near a butchery). The site is usually provided by the butcher owner, and only people who bought meat from the butcher are allowed to use the free facility. Shisa nyama is a Zulu phrase and, literally, means to "grill meat".

==== National Braai Day ====
Braai Day is a celebration of South Africa's rich cultural heritage and its unique national pastime, the braai. It aims to unite all South Africans by encouraging them to engage in an activity shared by all demographic groups, religious denominations, and body types. It is celebrated annually by South Africans across the world on 24 September (South Africa's Heritage Day).

The event was initiated by the Mzansi Braai Institute in South Africa in 2005 and, since 2008, has been promoted under the Braai4Heritage banner, a non-profit initiative. On 5 September 2007, Emeritus Archbishop Desmond Tutu (now deceased) was appointed patron of National Braai Day (now called Braai4Heritage). The initiative received the endorsement of South Africa's National Heritage Council (NHC) in 2008.

=== Zimbabwe ===
Similar to South Africa, the term braai is also used by Zimbabweans to refer to a barbecue. Other terms used are kugocha in the predominantly Shona North or chesa nyama in the South. Usually, a variety of different meats are prepared, including beef, pork and chicken. There are always several salads to accompany, including potato salad, beetroot, chakalaka and coleslaw. The popular sadza is also served during a braai, as well as rice.

=== Kenya ===
Nyama choma is the name used by Kenyans to refer to a barbecue. It is a social occasion with specific traditions and social norms. Wood and charcoal are the most widely used fuel for making Nyama choma. Ugali and kachumbari is often served as a side dish.

== East Asia ==
=== China, Hong Kong, and Macau ===
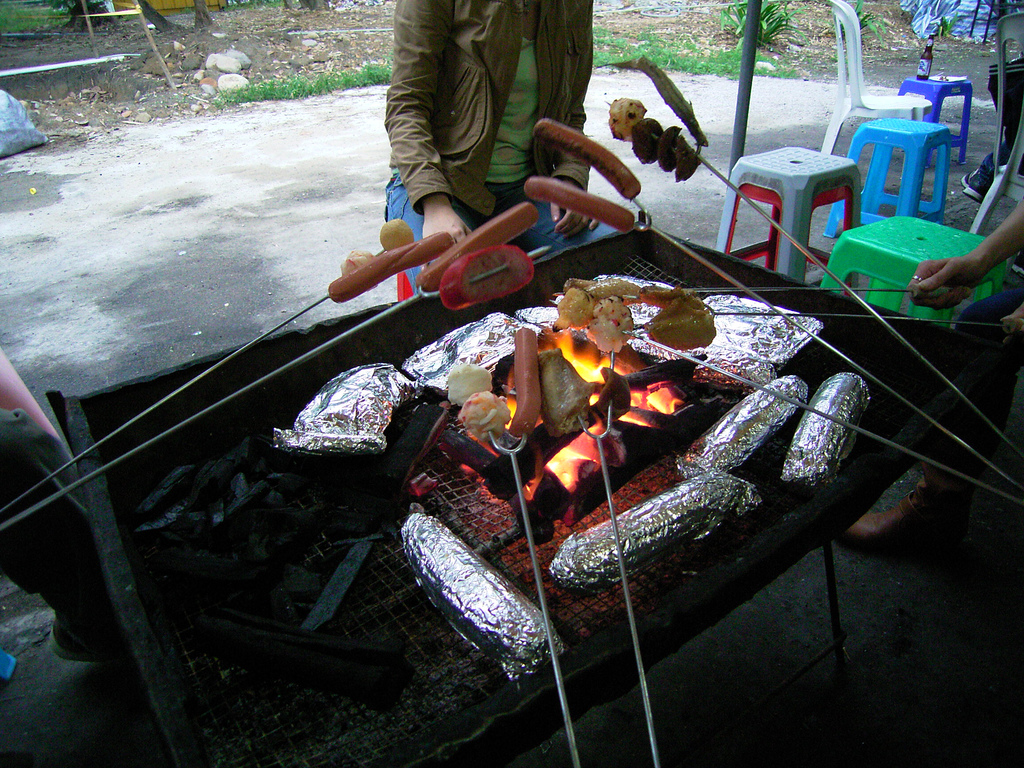
Hong Kong style barbecue

Chuanr are small pieces of meat on skewers roasted over charcoal or, sometimes, electric heat. Chuanr originated in Xinjiang and in recent years has spread throughout the rest of the country as a popular street food, most notably in northern China.

Chuanr was traditionally made from lamb (yáng ròu chuàn, 羊肉串), which is still the most common, but now, chicken, pork, beef, and various types of seafood can also be used. In busy tourist areas, chuanr can also be made with various insects, bugs, birds, and other exotic animals.

Barbecue can also be found in night markets and in some restaurants, often sold on skewers. Some restaurants allow customers to barbecue at their own table; many of these are all-you-can-eat chain restaurants.

In the Cantonese-speaking regions, pork barbecue is made with a marinade of honey and soy sauce, and cooked in long, narrow strips. This form of barbecue is known as char siu, and is commonly eaten and is a common street food.

In addition, outdoor barbecues (usually known simply as BBQ) are popular among residents on short trips to regional parks in the countryside. These are invariably charcoal-fired, with marinated pieces of meat, usually beef, pork, sausage or chicken wings, cooked using long, hand-held forks. Honey is brushed on near the end of cooking. At the same time, foil-wrapped pieces of corn and sweet potato are placed on the hot coals; these take a long time to cook, so they are usually eaten at the end of the barbecue.

Unlike Western barbecues, everyone gathers around the fire and cooks their own food, so the atmosphere is closer to that of a fondue or a hot pot.

=== Korea ===
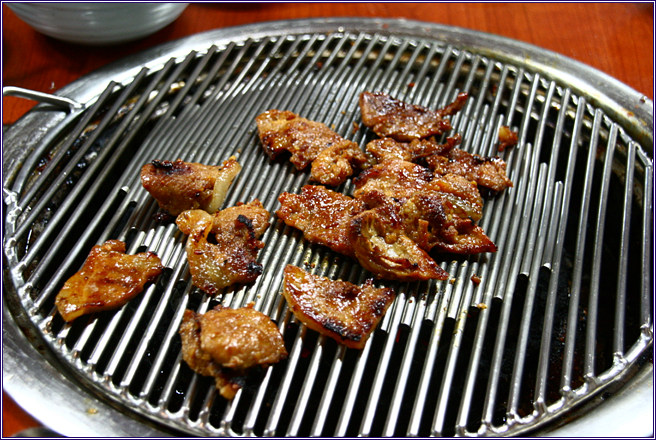
Korean barbeque grill used for cooking galbi

Bulgogi (불고기) is thinly sliced beef (sometimes pork or chicken) marinated in soy sauce, sesame oil, garlic and chili pepper, and cooked on a grill at the table. It is a main course and is therefore served with rice and side dishes such as kimchi. Bulgogi literally means "fire meat". The more common Korean BBQ is called galbi, which are marinated ribs.

=== Japan ===
Barbecuing is popular in Japan as an outdoor social activity, as well as encompassing popular styles of food preparation and presentation indoors. Soy sauce and mirin- or sake-based sauces and marinades are commonly used, such as in teriyaki. As a preparation descriptor, yaki (焼き or 焼) refers to cooking with direct heat. While it can encompass baking or pan/stir-fried on a griddle or pan, but the names of many styles of preparation use it as an affix for grilling or broiling.

Many meats are prepared by grilling or broiling. Spare ribs, chicken, steak, and pork are common staples, as well as Jingisukan (mutton), and horumonyaki (beef or pork offal). Vegetables and seafood are heavily incorporated in many Japanese barbecue styles as well.

Some popular examples are:

- Robatayaki (炉端焼き; "fireside-cooking"), often shortened to robata (ろばた), is a communal style of Japanese barbecue, cooked over Binchōtan (white charcoal). It developed first in Hokkaido, where fishermen used traditional irori sunken hearths to cook and keep warm. Today, irori or raised dais are typically used, and the style is popular throughout Japan and abroad.
- Kushiyaki (串焼き) is a broad, formal term for food items prepared on a skewer (kushi) and grilled (yaki). While yakitori refers specifically to chicken (or, regionally, when the same marinade is applied, as in Muroran to pork), the term is often informally used interchangeably with kushiyaki. Kushiyaki seasonings are primarily divided among two categories: salty or salty-sweet.
- Yakiniku refers broadly to grilled meat and vegetables cooked on gridirons or griddles over a flame of wood charcoals carbonized by dry distillation (sumibi, 炭火) or a gas or electric grill, typically in bite-sized pieces. While yakiniku originally referred to western "barbecue" food in the late 19th century, the origin of contemporary yakiniku is considered to be Korean barbecue.

=== Mongolia ===
Nomadic Mongolians have several barbecue methods, one of which is khorkhog. They first heat palm-sized stones to a high temperature over a fire and alternate layers of lamb and stone in a pot. The cooking time depends on the amount of lamb used. It is believed that it is good for one's health to hold the stone used for cooking.

Another way of cooking is a boodog (boo means "wrap" in Mongolian). Usually marmot or goats are cooked in this way. There is no pot needed for cooking boodog, after slaughter and dressing, the innards are put back inside the carcass through a small hole, and the whole carcass is cooked over the fire.

The Mongolian barbecue often found in restaurants is a style of cooking falsely attributed to the mobile lifestyle of nomadic Mongolians. Originating in Taiwan in the mid to late 20th century, the so-called "Mongolian barbecue", a popular dish in American and Canadian Chinese restaurants, consists of thinly sliced lamb, beef, chicken, pork, or other meat, seasonings, vegetables, and noodles, or a combination thereof, which is quickly cooked over a flat circular metal surface that has been heated.

== Southeast Asia ==
Satay is popular in several Southeast Asian countries, such as Thailand, Malaysia, Singapore, Indonesia and the Philippines. It consists of pieces of meat skewered on bamboo sticks marinated in a mixture of spices similar to a curry mix and pulverised peanut.

Most common meats are chicken, lamb, and beef, and in non-Muslim enclaves one will also find satay made from pork and animal offal.

Satay is a mainstay of most Malaysian, Indonesian, and Singaporean barbecues. Traditional satay uses only chicken thigh meat cut into strips before they are skewered. Other types of satay include pork, mutton, and beef.

After the meat has been cooked over a charcoal flame, it is served with a thick, gooey dipping sauce made from the same mixture as the marinade for the meat, a peanut-tasting, curry-like mixture.

In the mountainous regions of North Borneo, the local Kadazan people's specialities are chicken satay and snake-meat satay, though the latter, as of 2007, is only available under exceptional circumstances.

Before 1990, it was possible to get satay of animals like tapir, elephants, flying fox, goannas and wild boar. However, these animals are now rare or endangered and their use in this manner is prohibited.

=== Philippines ===
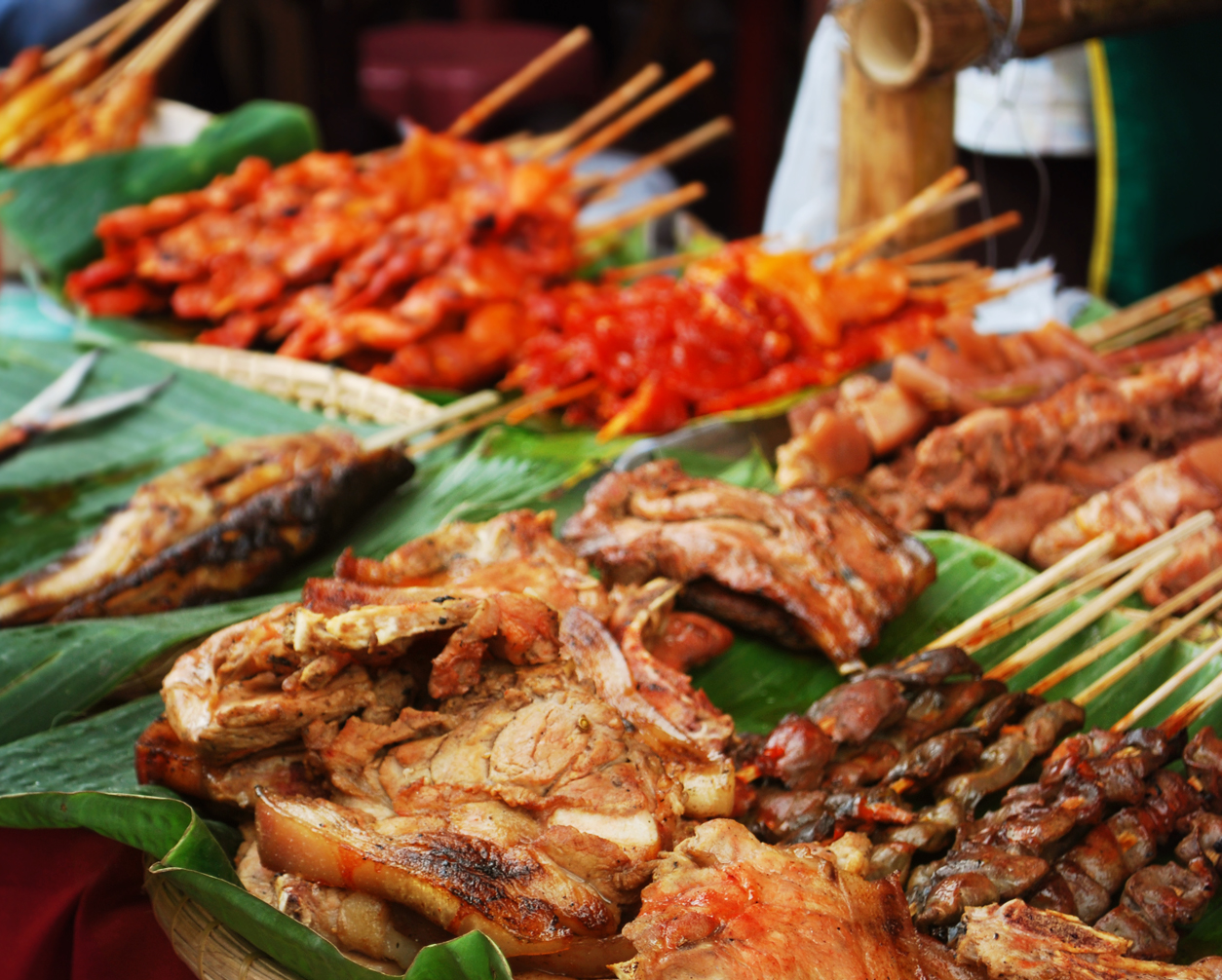
Various types of inihaw at the Dinagyang Festival

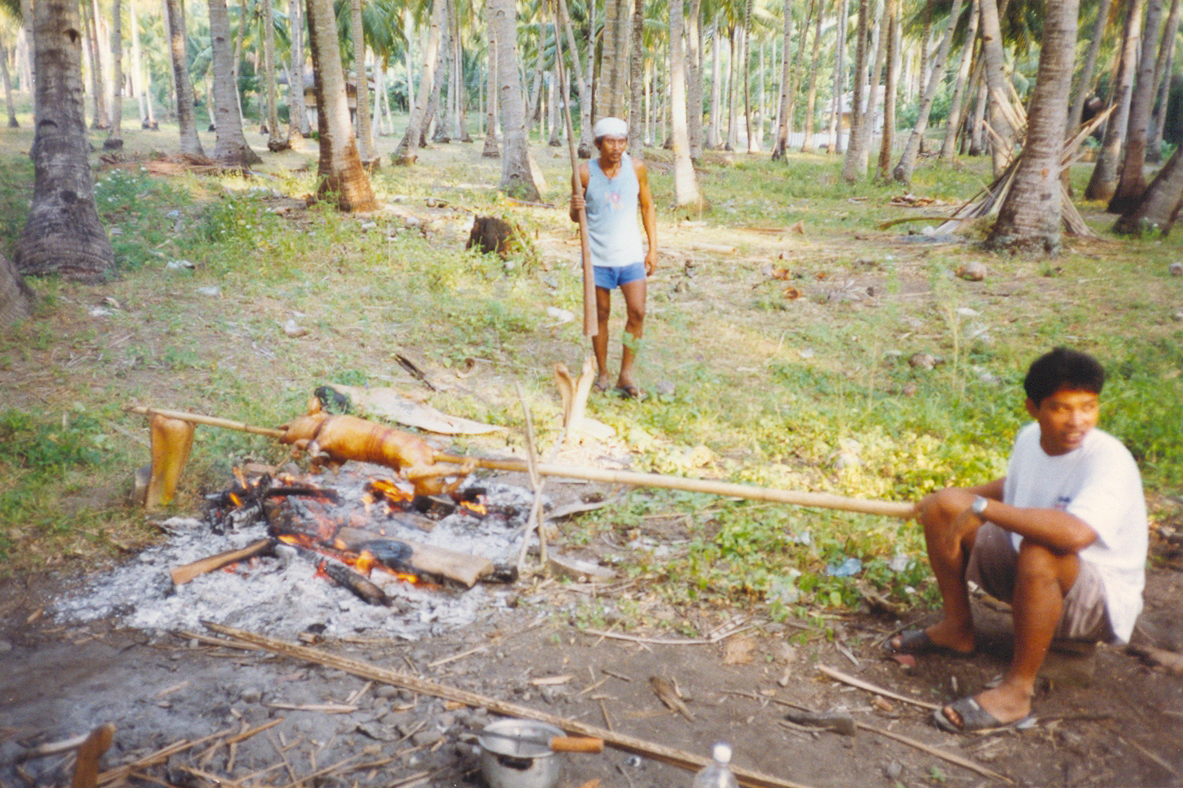
Philippine lechón being roasted

In the Philippines, native barbecue dishes are generally referred to as inihaw (also sinugba or inasal). They are usually made with pork or chicken and are served on bamboo skewers or in small cubes with a soy sauce and vinegar-based dip. It can also refer to any meat or seafood dish cooked and served in a similar way.

Inihaw are commonly sold as street food and are eaten with white rice or rice cooked in coconut leaves (pusô). Notable versions of inihaw dishes include chicken inasal, satti (a native version of satay), and isaw.

An extremely popular type of inihaw is the lechón, which is a spit-roasted whole pig dish stuffed with lemongrass and spices. Although it has acquired a Spanish name during colonial times, the method of cooking and the ingredients are indigenous to the Philippines. Lechon manok, a variant made with whole chicken, is also popular.

"Barbecue" (also "BBQ" or "barbeque") is also a general term in Philippine English to refer to food cooked on skewers. This includes dessert dishes like banana cue and camote cue.

=== Singapore ===
In the city state of Singapore, barbecue or BBQ, as it is commonly known, is a common feature at social gatherings, but a less common feature of a typical Singaporean's daily lifestyle and diet.

A majority of Singaporeans live in government subsidised apartments or HDB flats. A lack of open space in homes results in BBQ gatherings in parks or chalets.

The Singapore National Parks Board rents out barbecue pits that are placed in popular parks such as East Coast Park, Punggol Park, Pasir Ris Park, West Coast Park, Changi Beach Park, Sembawang Park, and Pulau Ubin.

Singapore-styled BBQ is mostly charcoal fired and Singaporeans roast a variety of Southeast Asian and Western food.

Besides satay, other BBQ food includes sambal stingray or cuttlefish wrapped in aluminium foil, grilled meat (chicken, pork, beef) marinated in BBQ sauce commonly made from soya sauce, pepper, salt, sugar, and oyster sauce. Taiwanese sausages, chicken franks, and sausages are also grilled. Marshmallows skewered using satay sticks is another highlight of a Singaporean barbecue.

The fire starter used is not the typical lighter fluid or charcoal chimney starter used in western grills. Instead, the fire starter comes in a box of small rolled up briquettes made of sawdust and wax which is lit and placed under a stack of charcoal briquettes.

=== Thailand ===
Mu kratha is a cooking method that originated in Thailand, In Philippines, Singapore and Malaysia, it is known as mookata.

Mu kratha is prepared with sliced meat (most often pork) is grilled on the dome in the centre while the vegetables and other ingredients, such as fish balls, cook in the soup (also called Thai suki). The hot pot sits on a pail of burning charcoal which grills or boils the food. The best foods for this cooking method are pork, chicken, mutton, lamb, seafood, vegetables, and mushrooms. The local traditional Thai mu kratha is usually served with nam chim suki, a popular dipping sauce. It is well known for using chili sauce as the main ingredient. Some restaurants serve nam chim seafood to accompany seafood.

When cooking mu kratha, a chunk of fat is commonly grilled at the apex of the pan so its grease prevents food from sticking.

Barbeque in Thailand are mostly found at restaurants inside shopping malls for example Bar-B-Q Plaza which is a mu kratha restaurant.

Besides mu kratha, common barbecued foods in Thailand are satay, kho mu yang, and kai yang.

== South Asia ==
=== India, Pakistan, and Afghanistan ===
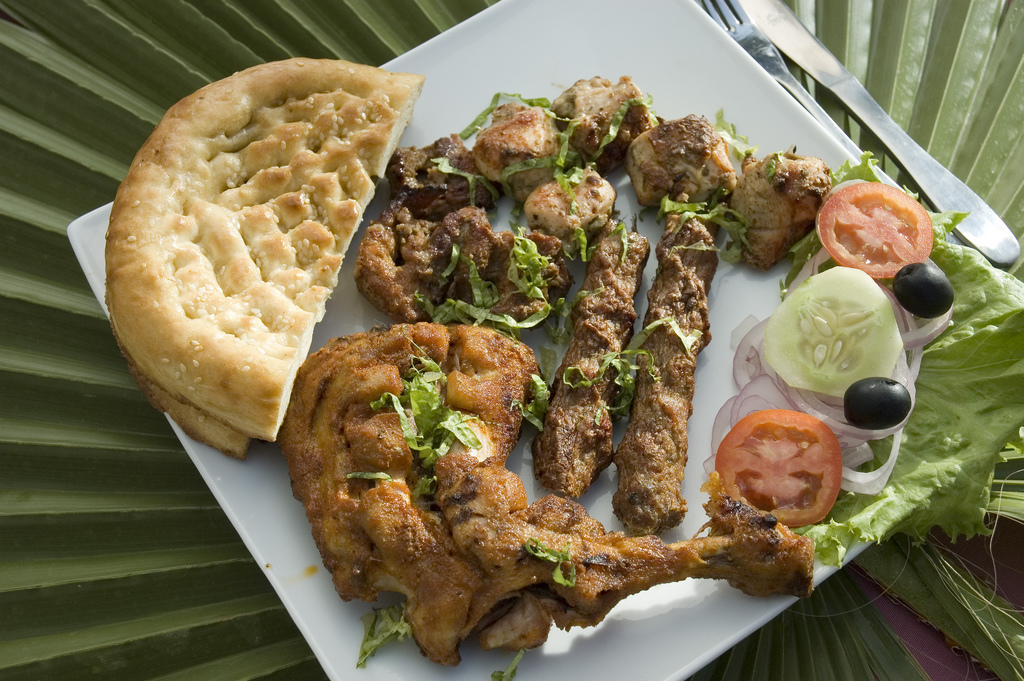
Chicken tikka with a variety of other dishes cooked and served under the BBQ method

Using the tandoor oven is a method of South Asian barbecue and baking common in Northern India, Afghanistan, and Pakistan. Traditionally tandoori grilling and roasting use native, local spices, especially the many curry blend variations. Tandoor-grilled meats, vegetables, and flatbreads (roti, naan), may be served after seasoning and grilling, or used as a preparation step for other dishes, like makhani, or variations like tikka masala, both popular representations of traditional and modern international Indian cuisine.

Pathar-ka-Gosht is also another dish of South India made on a stone grill using goat meat.

== Europe ==
=== The Alps ===
A traditional cooking method used in, but not exclusive to, the French and Swiss Alps, pierrade involves the (usually) communal cooking of meats on a hot stone, situated on the serving table.

=== Germany ===
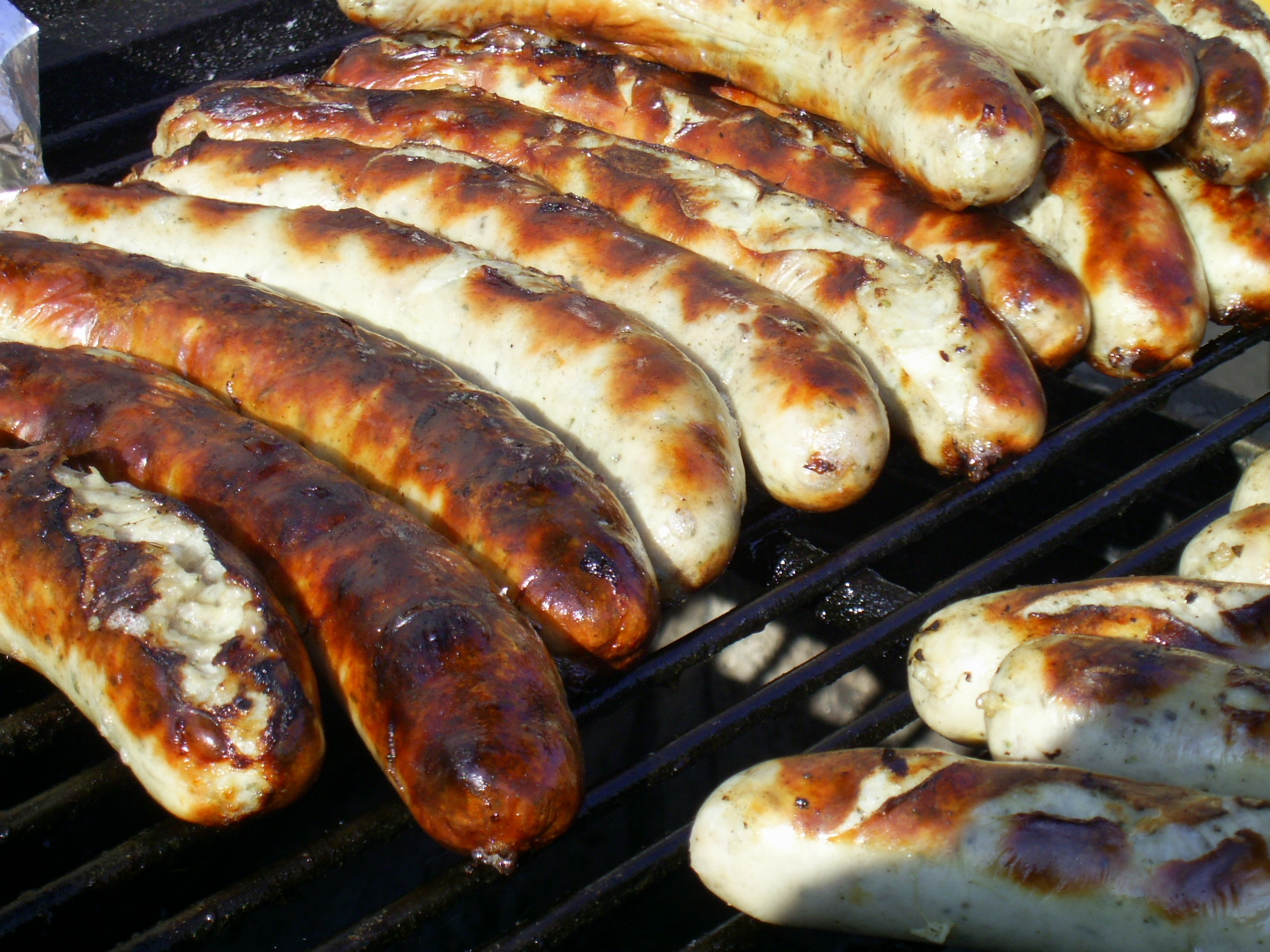
Thuringian sausages on the "Rost"

Germans are enthusiastic about their version of barbecue, grilling (Grillen), especially in the summertime. It is the one area of traditional home cooking that is a predominantly male activity.

Germans grill over charcoal or, increasingly, gas, and grilled meats include variations of the Bratwurst such as Thuringian sausage for example, as well as steaks (especially marinated pork steaks from the shoulder), Frikadellen (minced meat dumplings), Rostbrätel and poultry. Regional festivals feature grilled items ranging from eel to trout, whole sides of pork or beef, chicken, and duck.

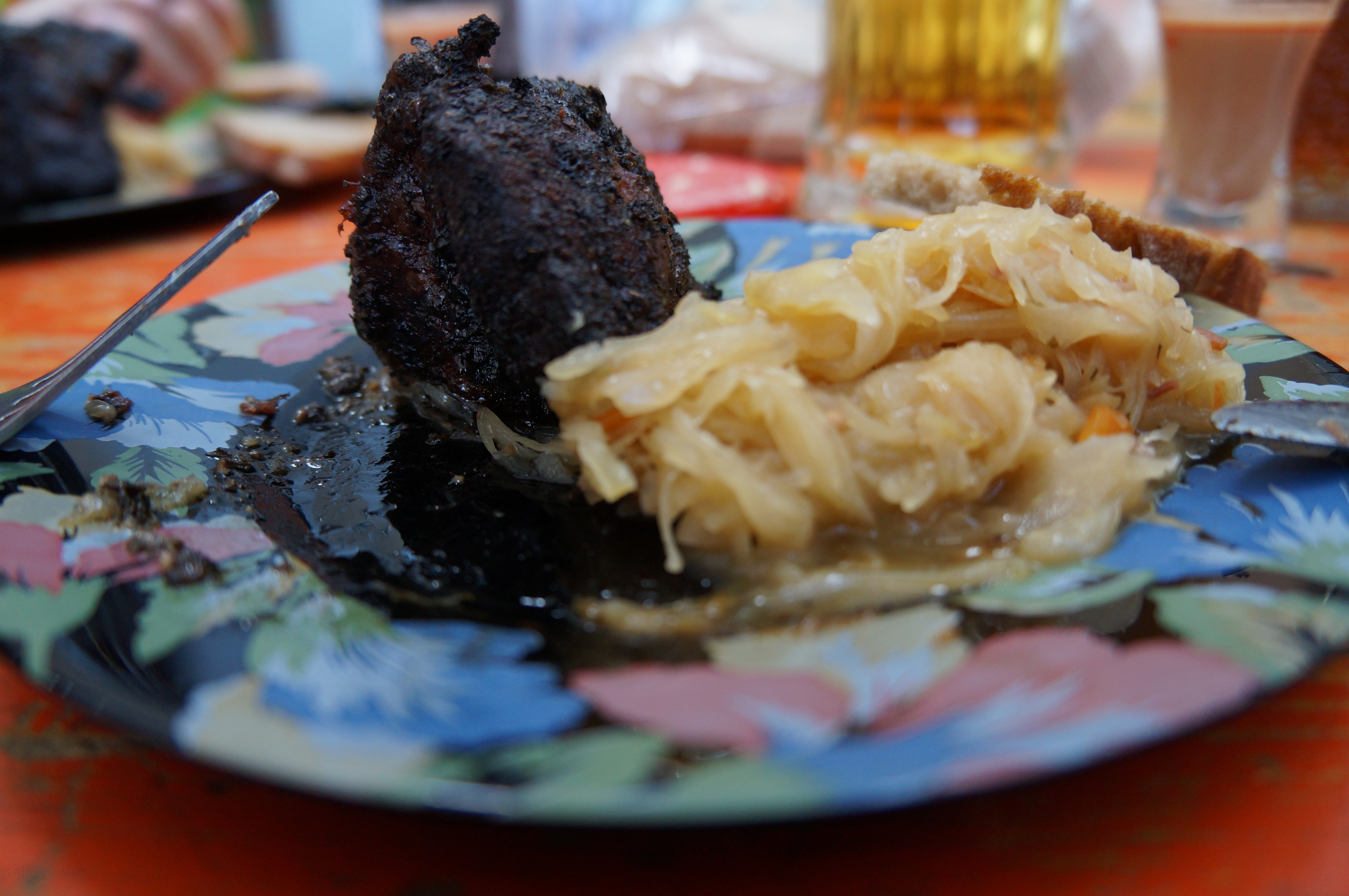
Mutzbraten with sauerkraut and bread

Smoking is common practice in German butchering, but pure smoke-based techniques have not yet become popular until a few years ago.

An old German barbecue-style food is the Mutzbraten (pork shoulder) in Saxony and Thuringia, a fist-sized piece of pork with a strong, dry marinade with marjoram, pepper and salt, cooked and smoked over pieces of birch wood. It is usually served with rye-wheat bread, sauerkraut and mustard.

Meanwhile, classic barbecue smoking techniques are also spreading in Germany and even industrially produced pulled meat like pork, chicken and turkey as well as a selection of barbecue sauces and side dishes like coleslaw are available as convenience food in many supermarkets.

Barbecue variations have come from the United States, Turkey, Greece, the Balkans, and immigrant communities in Germany, along with notable traditions of outdoor grilling in Germany developed by immigrants and visitors from the former Soviet Union.

=== Mediterranean ===
Barbecuing is popular in Mediterranean countries, influenced by traditional Mediterranean cuisine. Olive oil is a key part of the Mediterranean barbecue style.

The most common items cooked are chicken, beef steaks, souvlakis/brochettes, halloumi cheese, and pita bread, and may be grilled, baked, or both. In addition, some dishes combine grilling with braising for more variety.

Often, barbecue meat items are marinated with olive oil and citrus juice mixtures, and then garnished with various herbs and spices; basic persillade and several variations are often put on top of the meat.

=== Russia ===
Shashlik is the Russian version of shish kebab, and like all other international variants, is cooked on a grill. It is traditionally made of lamb, but there can also be pork, beef, ground seasoned beef, chicken, or sturgeon shashliks.

=== Scandinavian countries ===
Barbecue in Scandinavian countries, such as Finland, Denmark and Sweden, is very similar if not identical to barbecue in Germany, even having the same name. Typically, more traditional meats such as chicken, beef, lamb, pork and sausages, are cooked. Local fish like salmon, perch and mackerel are commonly grilled on open fire or smoked.

=== United Kingdom and Republic of Ireland ===
Barbecuing is a popular al fresco cooking and eating style in both the United Kingdom and Republic of Ireland. Many homes have a barbecue, usually located in the back garden. Most popular are steel-built kettle and range-style barbecues with wheels to facilitate moving the equipment, but permanent brick barbecues are also used. Both charcoal and bottled gas are used as fuel, with wood-fired and mains gas equipment being less common.

The most common foods cooked are chicken, hamburgers, sausages, beef steaks, pork chops, corn-on-the-cob, shish kebabs, and pork or beef ribs, cooked by grilling, baking or a combination of both methods.

Less common food items include lamb, fish, prawns, lobster, halloumi (cheese), squashes, potatoes, plantains, asparagus, beetroots, pork fillets, pork patties, and vegetarian soya or Quorn-based products.

Similar to the United States, barbecue sauce is sometimes spread on the meat before or during its cooking. All of the major supermarket chains now offer a range of barbecue products, although availability is usually limited to the barbecue season (late spring to early autumn).

Modern British cuisine, including barbecuing, is often cosmopolitan in nature, drawing on traditions and influences from the nation's multi-ethnic minority communities and around the globe. Generally, the British barbecuing style tends to most closely resemble that of North America, Germany, and Australia, however.

In recent times, barbecue cook-off competitions have started to take place in the British Isles, similar to those held in the United States, Canada, continental Europe, and Australia. Some competitions allow teams, as well as individuals from various countries, to compete against each other.

== West Asia and Eastern Mediterranean ==
Barbecue is an ancient tradition in West Asia, with medieval references to hunting for game, such as hare, gazelle, and wild boar, in the forests and mountains of Anatolia, Syria, and Lebanon

=== Iran ===
There are various types of Persian-style kabob, the main one being kubideh kabob, seasoned ground beef skewered and barbecued outside on a charcoal flame. There is also a marinated chicken kabob called jujeh kabob, and a filet-mignon steak kabob called kabob barg. Both are skewered as well.

All three main types of Persian kabob are usually served with Iranian style saffron rice and Shirazi salad, but can also be eaten with Middle-Eastern lavash bread.

=== Levant ===
In the countries of the Levant, various types of barbecued food are very popular. Kebabs such as shish taouk and others are often cooked on a mangal. Barbecued food is called mashawi in Levantine Arabic.

==== Israel ====
In Israel, "Al-Haesh" (Hebrew for "on the fire") is a common occurrence. Most often occurring on national holidays, such as Independence Day (Israel), small often single-use grills are used to cook a series of foods. Most common are kebabs with chicken, beef (primarily steak), alternating meat and vegetables, or all vegetables.

==== Lebanon ====
While Lebanese cuisine is not heavy on meats, barbecue is still popular on holidays with every home having a charcoal barbecue, usually placed on the balcony.

==== Turkey ====
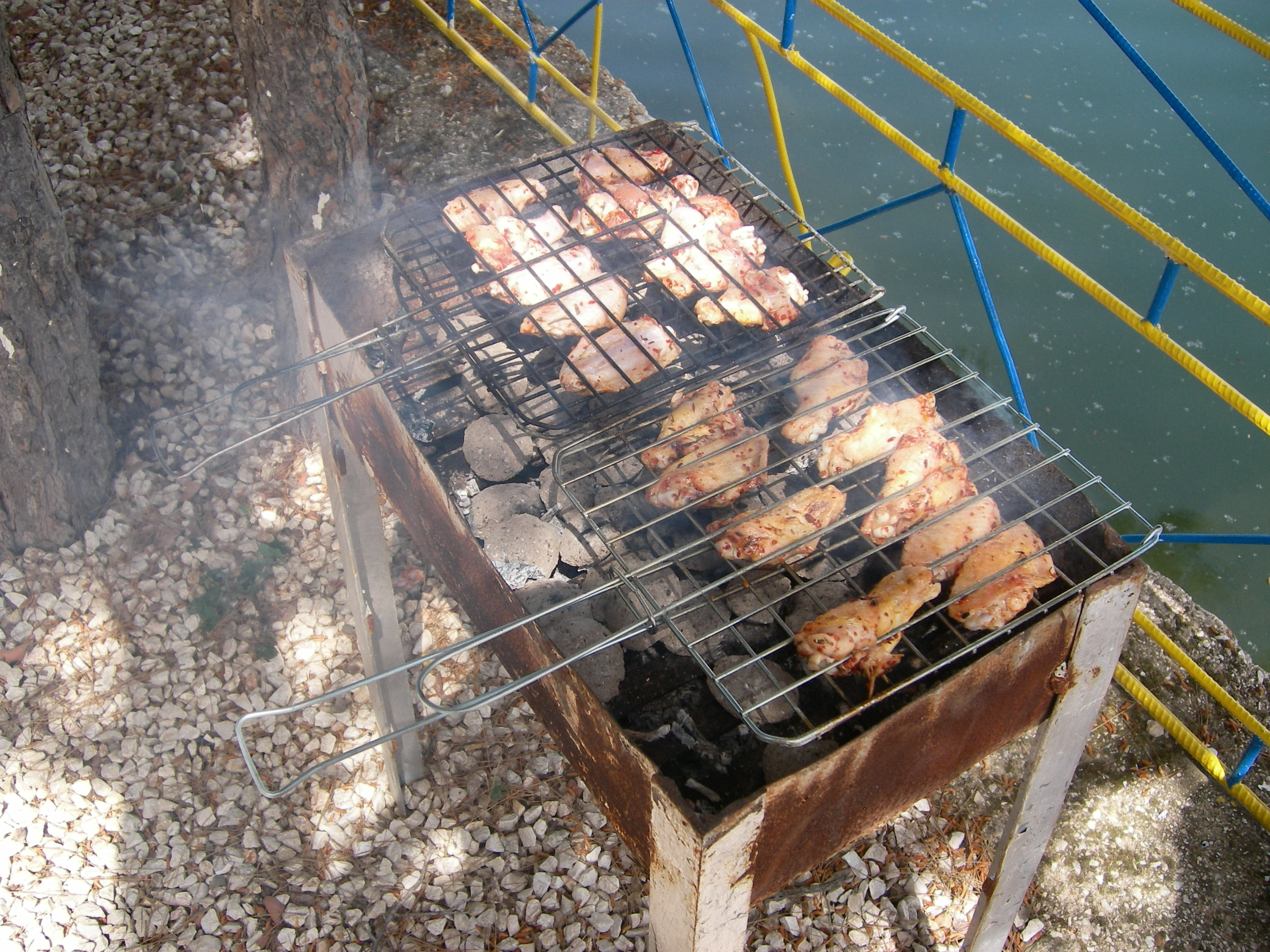
Turkish mangal

Like other Mediterranean cuisines, barbecuing is popular in Turkey. Kebabs such as şiş kebap, Adana kebap, köfte, fish, chicken, some offal like heart, kidney, liver, testicle, sucuk, and some vegetables are usually cooked on a mangal.

== North America ==
=== Canada ===
Meats have been cooked over open flames by the Aboriginal peoples of Canada since the beginning of the human habitation of North America. US-style barbecue culture is a recent import to Canada, having been introduced following the Second World War. Its arrival coincided with the commercially driven popularization of a type of "domestic masculinity" for middle-class suburban fathers in the 1950s.

This was a sharp break with Canadian tradition, however, and as late as 1955, an article in Maclean's magazine called the practice "weird". Therefore, barbecue, in the American sense, cannot be said to be a deeply held Canadian tradition (though it has always existed in the original barbacoa sense of meat cooked on a framework of sticks over a fire). Yet by the late 1950s, the barbecue, once a fad, had become a permanent part of Canadian summers.

Canadian barbecue takes many influences from its American neighbour, as well as from British, Central European, and Euro-Mediterranean barbecue styles. The most common items cooked on a Canadian barbecue are chicken, burgers, ribs, steaks, sausages, and shish kebabs. Barbecue sauce is either brushed on when the meats are cooking, or before the meats are served.

As in the United States, barbecue cook-off competitions are quite common. Barbecue cookouts, either pit-smoking, baking, grilling (charbroiling or griddling), or braising (by putting a broth-filled pot on top of a charbroil-grill) may also be combined with picnics.

=== Caribbean ===
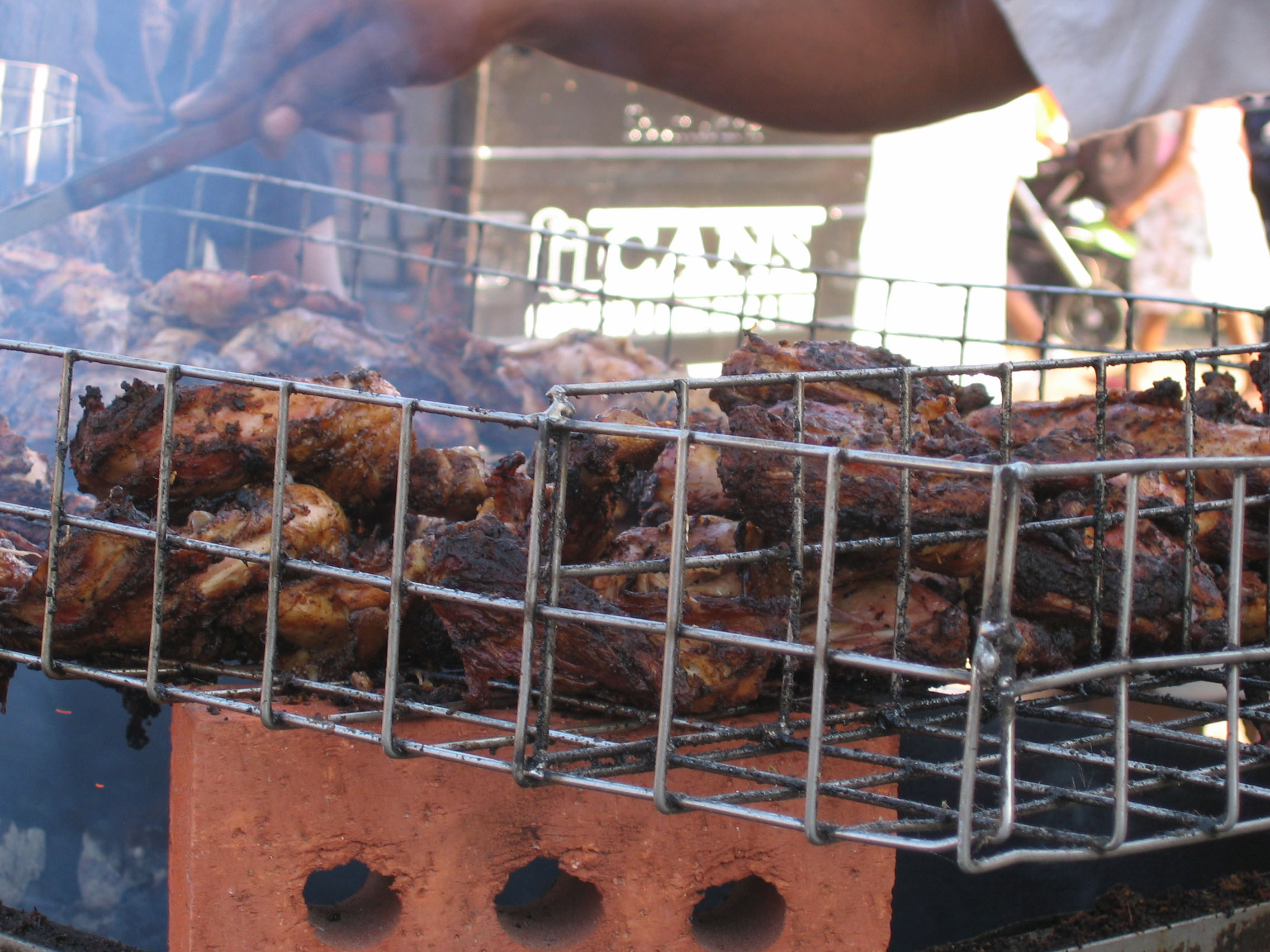
Jerk chicken being cooked

Barbecue is popular in all of the Caribbean islands, with each having its own local variations and traditions.

==== Cuba, the Dominican Republic, and Puerto Rico ====
The indigenous Native Taíno peoples method has involved slowly cooking meat over a wooden mesh of sticks. In Spanish-speaking islands of the Caribbean, such as Cuba, the Dominican Republic, and especially Puerto Rico, lechon is a common delicacy. Lechon consists of taking a whole pig, slicing it from the head to tail along the chest and stomach, and slow-grilling the hog as it is turned on a rod.

==== Jamaica ====
Jamaican jerk chicken is an example of barbecue in Jamaica.

=== Mexico ===
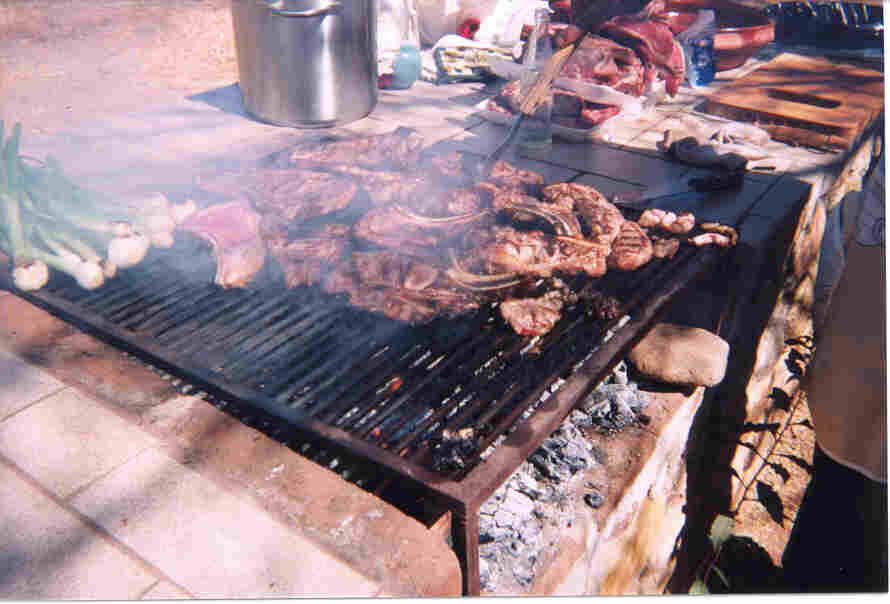
Parrillada carne asada

In Mexico the horno is a traditional earthen barbecue tradition. Carne asada (literally meaning "roasted meat") consists of marinated cuts of beef rubbed with salt and pepper, and then grilled. Normally, it is accompanied with tortillas and grilled onions and bell peppers as well. This dish is now extremely popular in the entire country; although it is widely believed to have originated in the northern part of Mexico, it is now found almost everywhere in Mexico and the southwestern United States.

Additionally, there are several other types of meats that are barbecued in Mexico, depending on the geographic region. In the northern part of the country, cabrito is a popular barbecue dish, which consists of an entire kid goat, minus head, hooves and entrails (except the kidneys), slowly grilled/smoked on an open charcoal grill. The kidneys release a strong desired flavor as the carcass is slowly cooking over the fire.

A somewhat similar dish, popular all over the country, is barbacoa, which is sheep meat slowly cooked over an open flame, or more traditionally in a fire pit. Also, as in many other places in Latin America, there is a strong tradition in Mexico of preparing pollo asado (roasted halved chicken) on mesquite charcoal-fired grills after the chicken meat has been marinated overnight in an often secretly guarded recipe adobo sauce.

In addition to carne asada, there are several types of beef, chicken and pork, as well as sausages (such as chorizo and moronga) that are grilled during back-yard or picnic-style events, commonly referred to as parrilladas.

Some types of vegetables may be grilled alongside the meat, most commonly green onions, bell peppers and chile peppers, commonly referred to in Mexico as chiles toreados, or "bullfight chiles".

Often quesadillas and tortillas accompany the consumption of grilled meat at these events, as well as soft drinks for children and alcoholic beverages for adults.

=== United States ===
There is a wide variety of barbecue styles in the United States, but four major styles are commonly referenced: North Carolina and Memphis, which rely on pork and represent the oldest styles, and Kansas City and Texas, which use beef as well as pork.

The US has a range of contemporary suburban barbecue equipment and styles, which often consist of baking, grilling (charbroiling, grid ironing, or griddling), braising (by putting a broth-filled pot on top of a charbroil grill or gridiron grill), or smoking various meats (depending on the cut).

== South America ==
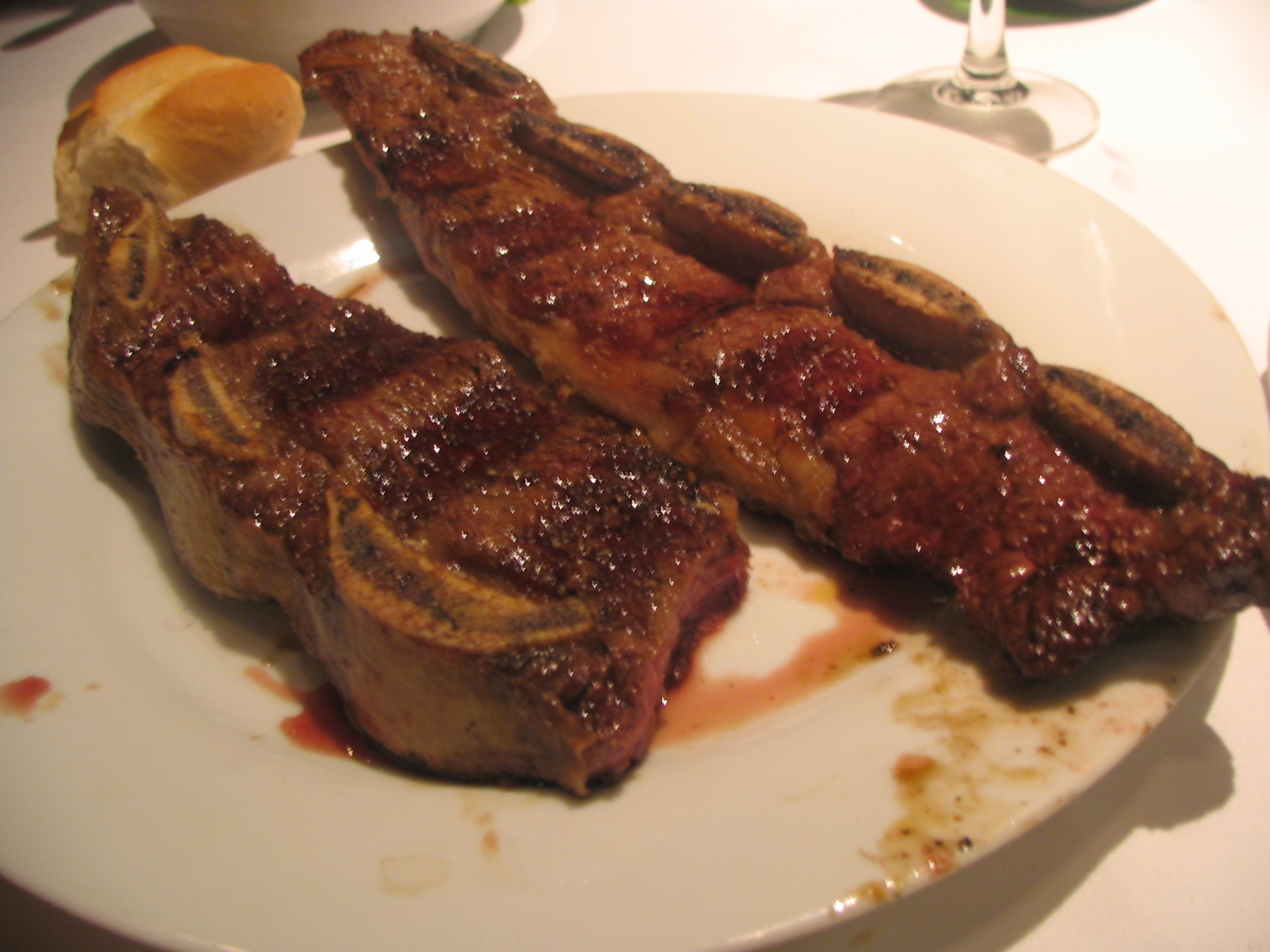
Asado de tira (flank-cut short ribs)

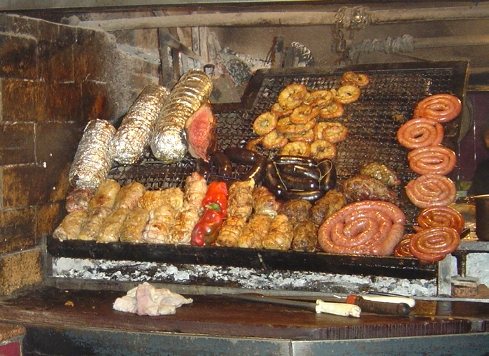
Asado with achuras (offal) and sausages

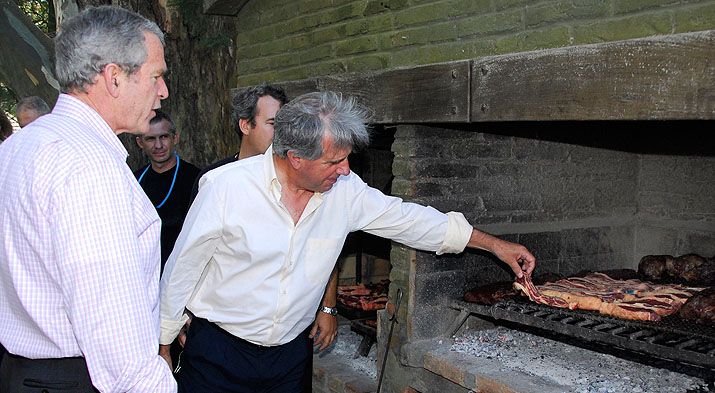
Former President of Uruguay Tabaré Vázquez receives former US President George W. Bush with asado a la parrilla

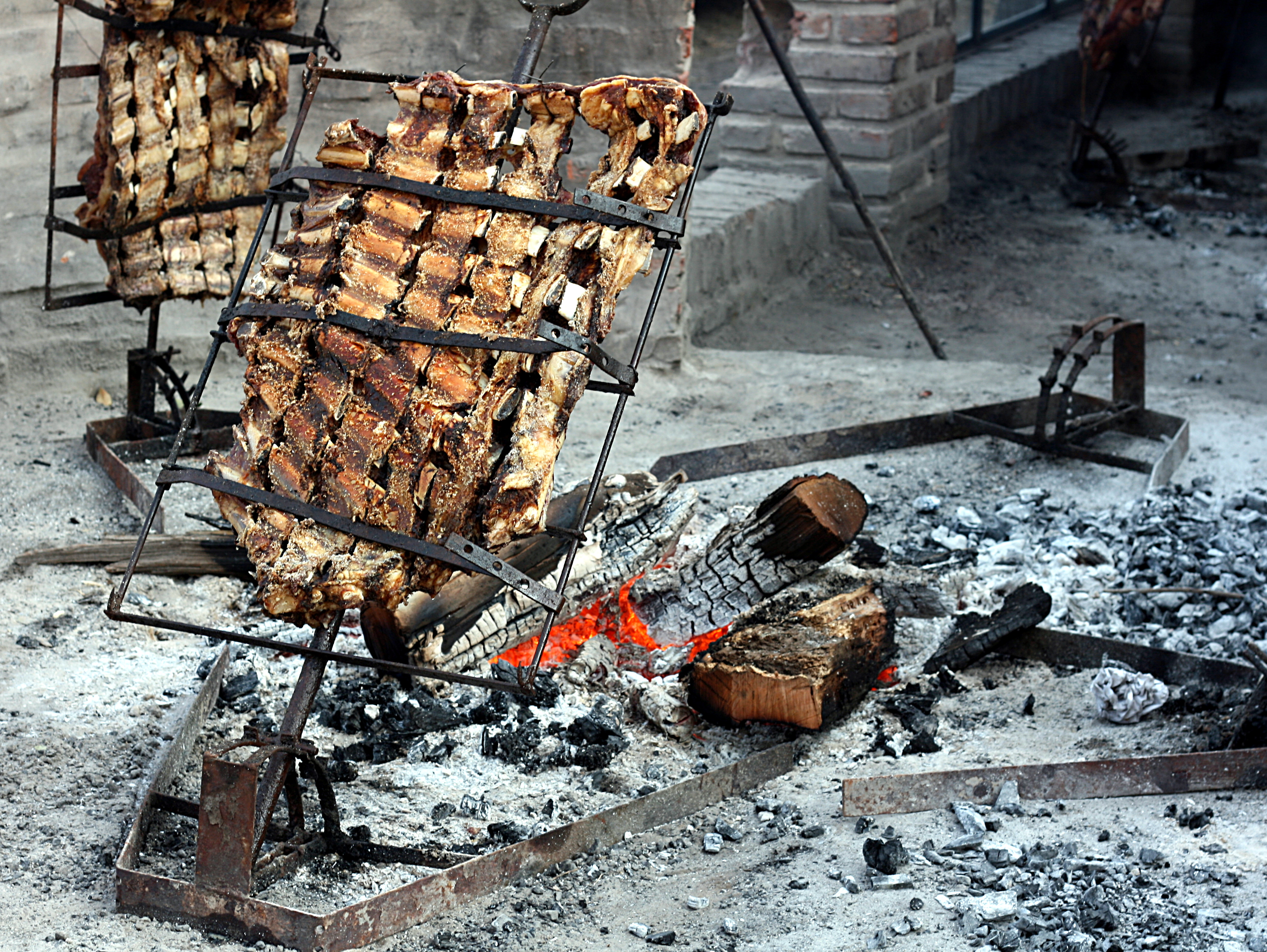
An asado on an open pit, an alternative desirable in good weather and with a large crowd of guests

Asado is a technique for cooking cuts of meat, usually beef, alongside various other meats, which are cooked on a grill (parrilla) or open fire. It is considered the traditional dish of Argentina, Uruguay, Paraguay, Chile, Brazil, and Bolivia.

=== Argentina and Uruguay ===
Also generally called parrilla or asado in Argentina and Uruguay, some alternatives are the asado al disco and asado al horno de barro, especially in the countryside. The recipe does not change, only the method of cooking the meat and offal. In the more conventional style asado a la parrilla, different cuts of meat, sausages and offal are placed on top of a metallic mesh with legs (parrilla) such that the meat stands some 15 cm above the ground. Below the parrilla is placed charcoal, and the cooking takes some 60 to 90 minutes depending on the thickness of the meat cut.

In the asado al disco, the worn-out disc of a plough is used. Being metallic and concave, three or four metallic legs are welded and with hot coal or wood below it is easily transformed into a very effective griddle (the meat is not directly exposed to coals or flame, thus it is not grilled). Meat and offal are arranged in a spiral, in such a way that the fat naturally slips to the centre, preventing the meat from being deep-fried. Chili peppers and onions are usually put next to the edge, so that they gradually release their juices onto the meat.

The asado al horno de barro differs from traditional asado, as an horno (adobe oven) is used. These primitive ovens are a common view in Argentine estancias, and their primary function is to bake bread, but they are well suited for roasting meat.

Suckling pig and, less commonly, lamb are served, as they are less likely to dry out. Though not technically a grill, it is a traditional way of cooking that still requires the great skills of an asador and the gathering of family and friends, which are the essence of asado. Moreover, this cooking method yields a tender dish with a smoky flavor.

=== Brazil ===
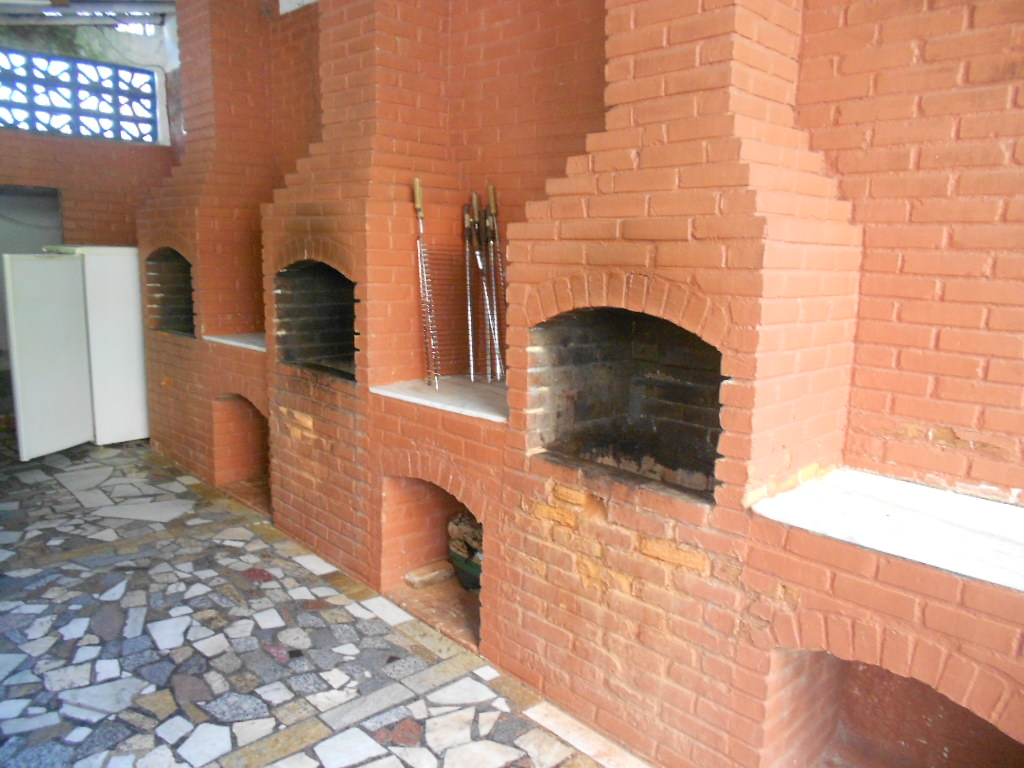
Brazilian churrasqueira

Churrasqueira in Portuguese is any type of assembly, installation or electrical device, intended for preparing churrasco. It usually comes with a fixed or removable grill or gridiron. "Grill", "grillroom", and "grill area" are common English translations for churrasqueira.

In Brazil, a churrasqueira is often a brick pillar with a grilling space in the middle. In a Brazilian barbecue, a variety of meats, pork, sausage, and chicken are cooked on a purpose-built churrasqueira, frequently with supports for spits or skewers. Portable churrasqueiras are similar to those used to prepare the Argentine and Uruguayan asado, with a grill support, but many Brazilian churrasqueiras do not have grills, only the skewers above the embers. The meat may alternatively be cooked on large metal or wood skewers resting on a support or stuck into the ground and roasted with the embers of charcoal (wood may also be used, especially in the state of Rio Grande do Sul).

=== Chile ===
In Chile, the local version of the asado is usually accompanied with pebre, a local condiment made from pureed herbs, garlic and mildly hot peppers.

== Oceania ==
=== Australia ===
In Australia, barbecuing is a popular summer pastime, often referred to as a "barbie". Traditional meats cooked are lamb chops, beef steak, and sausages (colloquially known as "snags"). Coin-operated or free public gas or electric barbecues are common in city parks.

Beer is often drizzled over meat during cooking, the theory being that it adds flavor while making the meat more tender. Meat is sometimes marinated for flavor and is then cooked on a hot plate or grill. Australian barbecues tend to be either all hot-plate or half and half hot-plate/grill.

The barbecuing of fish and other seafood such as shellfish, like prawns and rock lobster (colloquially known locally as "crayfish" or just "crays"), has become increasingly popular in Australia over the last few decades.

Breakfast is another popular meal prepared on the barbecue, which generally consists of the items served in a full breakfast (bacon, eggs, sausages, tomato, mushrooms) being cooked on a hot plate and/or grill. US-style barbecuing, or smoking, as opposed to the traditional grilling techniques, is becoming increasingly popular.

Holding barbecues is also a common method of fundraising for schools and local communities, where sausages and chopped onions are cooked on a hot-plate style barbecue and served on white bread or hotdog buns, with tomato sauce or unheated barbecue sauce. These events are often referred to as sausage sizzles. This is also a popular method for feeding emergency services volunteers, evacuees, and stranded travellers, often with a range of commercially made salads. The Democracy Sausage Sizzle is a well recognized event in which BBQs appear at polling places on political election days.

=== Hawaii ===
The cooking customs of the indigenous peoples of Polynesia became the traditional Hawaiian barbecue of kalua in an underground oven called an imu, and the lūʻau, of the Native Hawaiians. It was brought to international attention by 20th-century tourism to the Hawaiian islands.

=== New Zealand ===
Barbecues are a very popular activity in New Zealand. A common feature in New Zealanders' gardens, it is generally powered by bottled LPG. Electric barbecues are also provided for free at many beaches and public parks throughout the country.

Foods cooked include beef, lamb, pork, fresh fish, crayfish, shellfish, and vegetables. Sausages are a popular and demanded element of barbecues and, as in Australia, sausage sizzles are one of the most common forms of fundraiser.

New Zealand barbecue is similar to a mix of American, British, Australian, South African and Pacific Island styles. Multi-cultural society in New Zealand has also led to Pakistani, Indian,(South Asian), Middle Eastern, East Asian, and South American, which all have influenced the flavors and types of food found at a barbecues around the world.

=== South Pacific islands ===
Barbecuing is popular in the Australasian, Melanesian, Micronesian, and Polynesian islands, and every country and culture has its own version of earth oven barbecue cuisine. Some of the most legendary and continuously practiced examples can be found in South Pacific Oceania.

Tahitians call their earth oven barbecue a hima’a. A thousand miles away in the Marquesas Islands, it is known as the umu. With many tropical islands' styles of barbecue, the meat is marinated, glazed with a savory sauce, and adorned with local tropical fruits. While pork predominates, horse is also popular in countries such as Tonga and Samoa.

== See also ==
- List of barbecue dishes
- List of smoked foods
