= Boerewors =

Sausage originating from South Africa

Boerewors Sausage
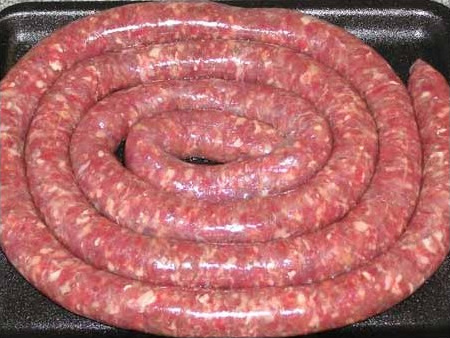
- Raw boerewors
- Place of origin: South Africa, Botswana, Zimbabwe
- Main ingredients: Minced meat

Boerewors (pronounced [ˈbuːrəˌvɔrs]) is a type of sausage which originated in South Africa. It is an important part of South African, Setswana, Zimbabwean cuisine and is popular across Southern Africa. The name is derived from the Afrikaans words boer (literally, a farmer) and wors ('sausage'). According to South African government regulation, boerewors must contain at least 90 percent meat or fat from beef, pork, lamb or goat. The other 10% is made up of spices and other ingredients. Not more than 30% of the meat content may be fat. Boerewors may not contain offal other than the casings, or any mechanically separated meat (as recovered through a process where meat and bone are mechanically separated).

== History ==
Boerewors is made from coarsely minced beef, minced pork, lamb and/or goat. When locally available antelopes such as springbok or oryx are included, the sausage must be labelled with the species from which the meat originates. It also contains spices (usually toasted coriander seed, black pepper, nutmeg, cloves and allspice). Like many other forms of sausage, boerewors may contain a high proportion of fat, and is preserved with salt and vinegar, and packed in edible sausage casings, which are the only part of the sausage which may be offal. Traditional boerewors is usually formed into a continuous spiral. It is often served with pap (traditional South African porridge / polenta made from mielie-meal). Boerewors is also very common throughout Namibia, Botswana, Mozambique as well as with expatriate South African communities worldwide.

=== Guinness World Record ===
On 3 May 2014, the Guinness World Record for braaiing the longest boerewors in the world was broken in South Africa by Aiden. The sausage measured 1,557.15 m (5,108 ft 9 in) in length. The boerewors was distributed freely to old-age homes and the Abraham Kriel Orphanage.

== Ingredients ==
- 2 kg beef (30% fat)
- 1 kg fatty pork (neck, shoulder, belly)
- 45ml whole coriander seeds
- 5ml whole cloves
- 15ml fresh ground black pepper
- 2ml grated nutmeg
- 10ml ground allspice
- 10ml brown sugar
- 125ml dry red wine or 125 ml dark vinegar
- 90g thick sausage casings, soaked in water

== Preparation ==
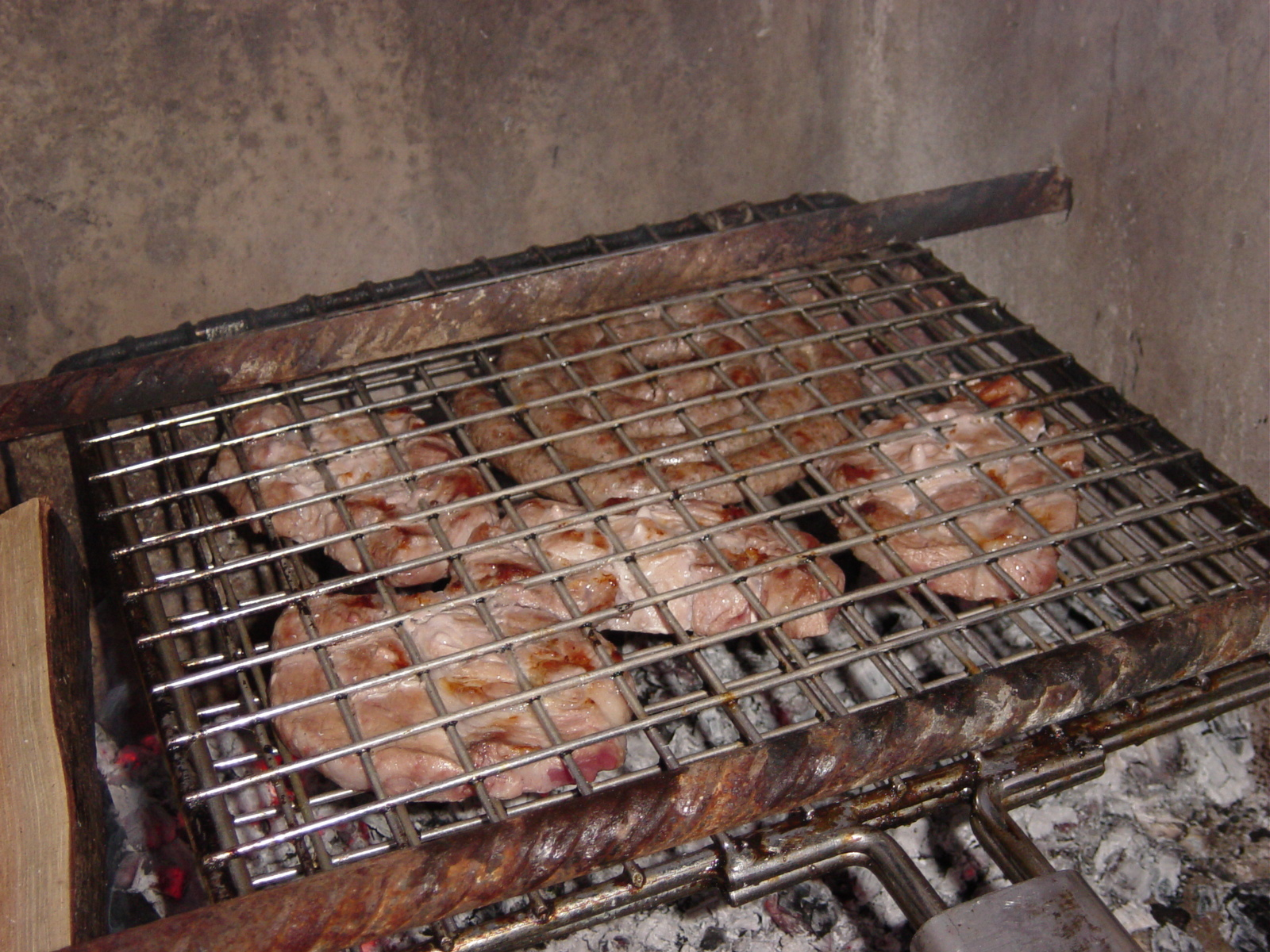
Boerewors and other meat on a grill

Boerewors is most traditionally braaied (grilled over charcoal or wood), but is often cooked under an electric grill, or roasted in an oven, or fried in a pan. When cooking Boerewors, pricking the casing will lead to the sausage losing much of the moisture and fat during cooking. A local variant of the hot dog is the boerewors roll, or "boerie" roll, which is a piece of boerewors in a hot dog bun, often served with a tomato, chili and onion relish or chakalaka. Some people prefer boerewors stew which can be prepared with mashed potatoes or pap.

== Variations ==
The many varieties of boerewors include specialties such as garlic wors, kameeldoring (camel thorn), Karoowors (sausage from the Karoo region in South Africa), and spekwors (made with cubed pork fat). Other ingredients include cheese and chilli peppers.

A similar sausage may also be made from the meat of different animal species, such as kudu, and springbok, but it may not be sold as boerewors. Instead, it is named after the predominant meat species, but only if it contains at least 75% meat from that specific species. When a sausage is made from different types of game, it may not be labelled boerewors but must be labelled as game sausage and with the names of the game species in it.

Boerewors does not keep well unrefrigerated. A similar dried or cured sausage called droëwors is prepared instead in a process similar to the preparation of biltong. Droëwors has become popular in its own right as a snack.

In response to the modern plant-based food movement, various vegan boerewors substitutes, mostly made by small and home-based industries, have begun to appear in retailers and food markets in South Africa. They may not be labeled as boerewors.

== Competitions ==
The preparation and grilling of boerewors has become a fine art with many local, regional and national competitions taking place. The Shoprite supermarket chain hosts an annual competition to determine the best new preparations. The winner of this competition has the privilege of having their product/recipe manufactured and sold in all Checkers stores nationwide, under the Championship Boerewors brand.

== See also ==
- South African cuisine
