= Sausage sizzle =

Sausage on bread

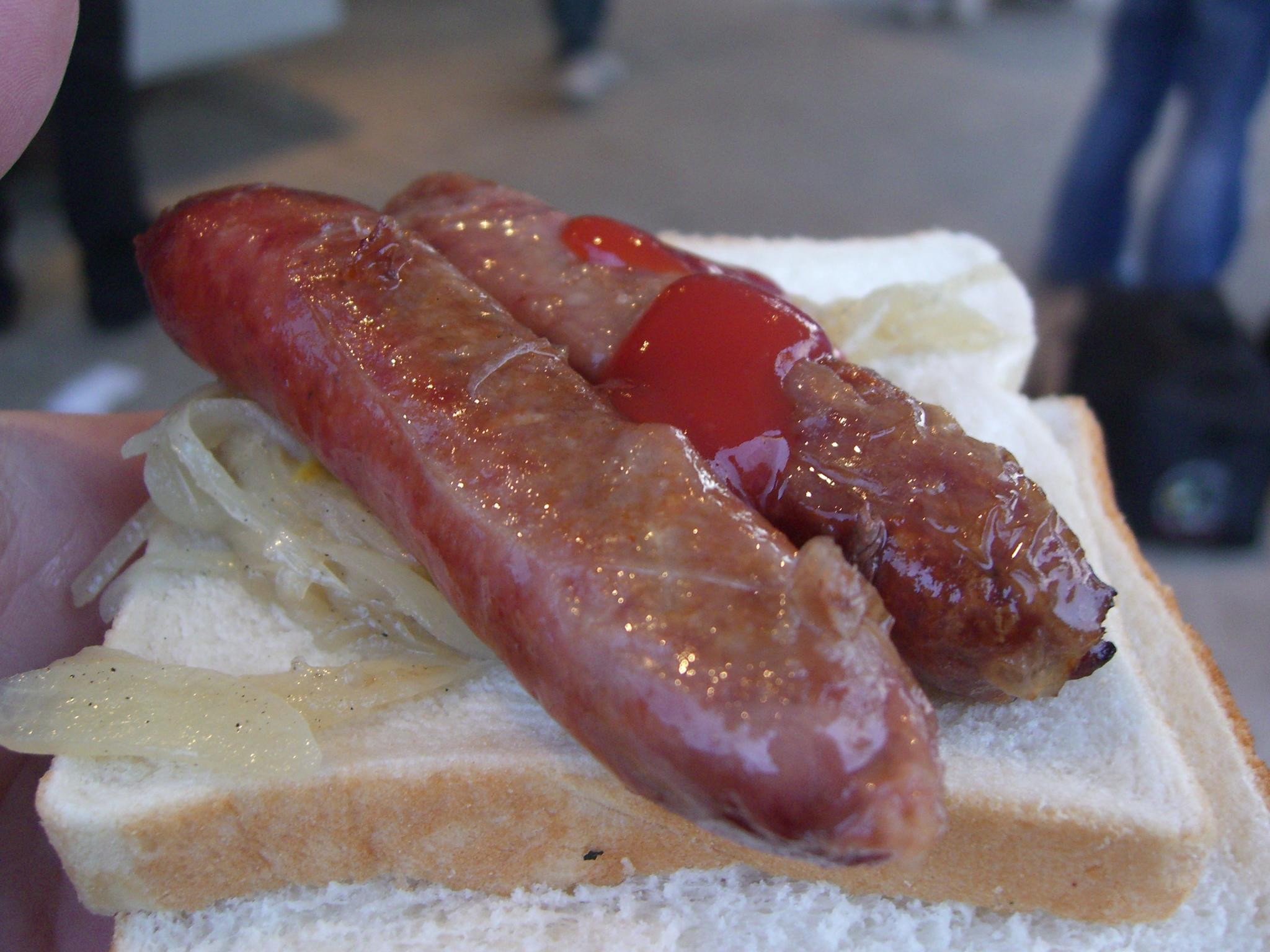
- Two sausages in bread served with onions and tomato sauce
- Course: Snack
- Associated cuisine: Australia, New Zealand
- Main ingredients: Sausage, sliced bread

A sausage sizzle is a community event originating from either Australia or New Zealand to cook and serve sausages in bread (also referred to as sausage sandwiches or sausage sizzles), which are grilled or barbecued sausages (most commonly beef or pork) served in sliced bread with grilled onions and various condiments, most commonly tomato sauce, barbecue sauce or mustard. The term "sausage sizzle" came into common use in the 1980s and is used primarily to refer to the barbecuing event, but also to the sausage itself, mostly in Western Australia.

Sausage sizzles are generally held either as free community events or as fundraisers for charities, schools, sports clubs and other organisations. As such, ingredients and equipment are cheaply purchased or donated by suppliers. Fundraising sausage sizzles have become particularly associated with elections in Australia (colloquially known as a democracy sausage) and the hardware chain Bunnings.

== Format ==
Most commonly, the main sale item at a sausage sizzle is a pork or beef sausage (often colloquially referred to as a "snag"), cooked on a grill or barbecue and served on a single slice of white sandwich bread, or a hot dog roll in Western Australia. Tomato sauce is the most common accompaniment, and is usually available for no extra cost, although other condiments such as barbecue sauce and American mustard are regularly available. Grilled onions are often available, for free or at extra cost.

Some sausage sizzles also offer the option of a white bread roll as an alternative to sliced bread. Vegetarian or gluten-free options are infrequently available, but they are often sold at events with more extensive menus, including hamburgers or complete meals. Cans of soft drink or bottled water may also be available for purchase, especially to maximise fundraising.

== Prevalence ==
=== Australian elections ===
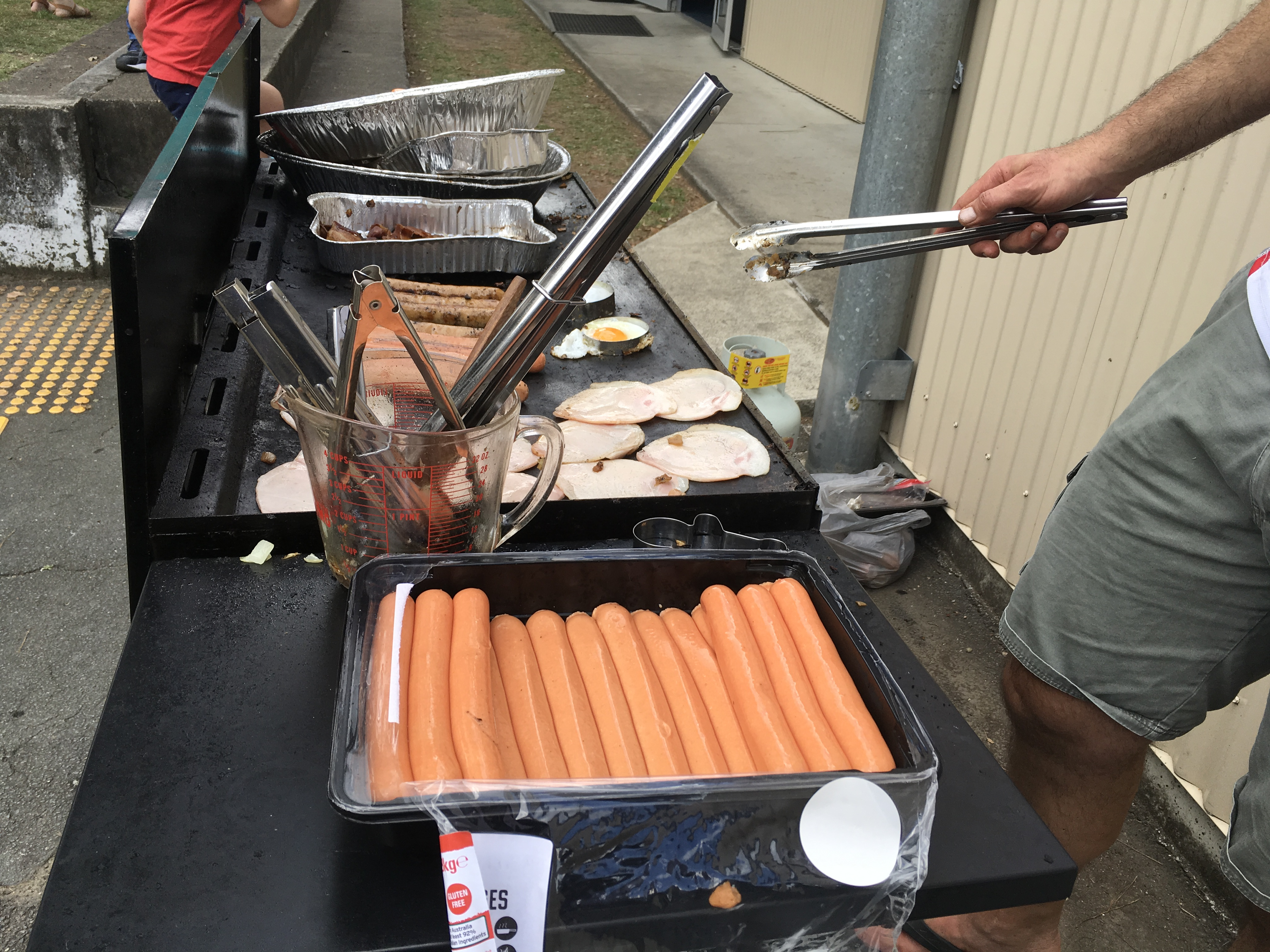
Democracy sausages at a sausage sizzle in the electoral district of Moggill at the 2017 Queensland state election

Sausage sizzles have become a recognised and expected addition to polling booths at Australian elections, with sausages at these stations nicknamed 'Democracy Sausages'. There was widespread media coverage of this in the 2013 and 2016 Australian federal elections, with the hashtag "#democracysausage" trending on Twitter. Twitter also added a sausage-in-bread emoji to the '#ausvotes' hashtag on the day of the 2016 election; it was the most widely used emoji in relation to the election under that hashtag. During the 2016 election, the leader of the Australian Labor Party, Bill Shorten, came under scrutiny for the way in which he consumed his sausage in bread.

=== Bunnings Warehouse ===
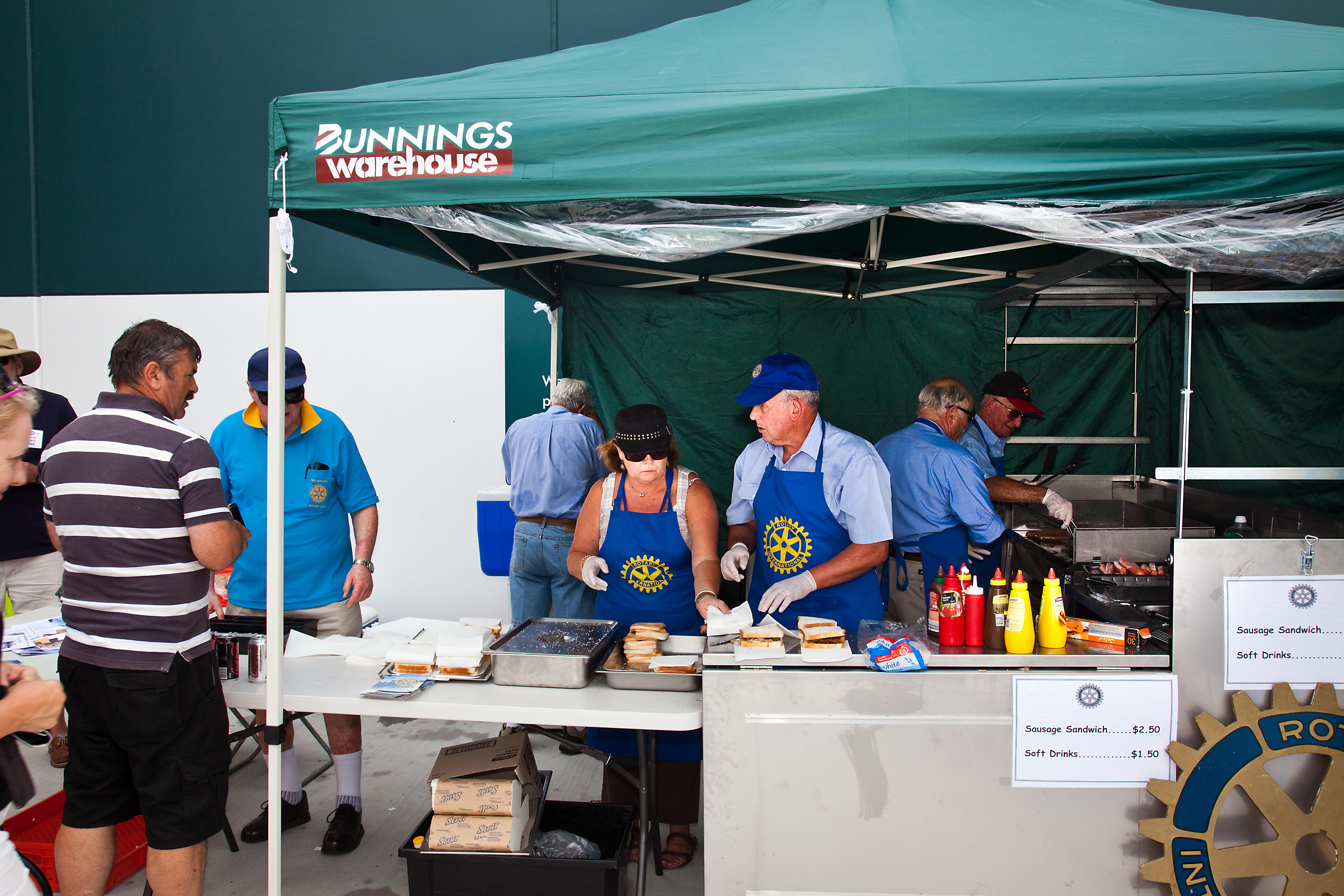
A sausage sizzle fundraising event at Bunnings

Australian hardware chain Bunnings offers barbecue facilities at all of its stores for hire to community groups. Sausage sizzles at these locations usually occur on weekends and have become associated with the Bunnings brand. In 2016, when Bunnings expanded to the United Kingdom, it brought the sausage sizzle there as well, resulting in considerable media coverage.

== See also ==
- Sausage sandwich
- Hot dog
- Cheese roll
