= Chakalaka =

South African vegetable relish

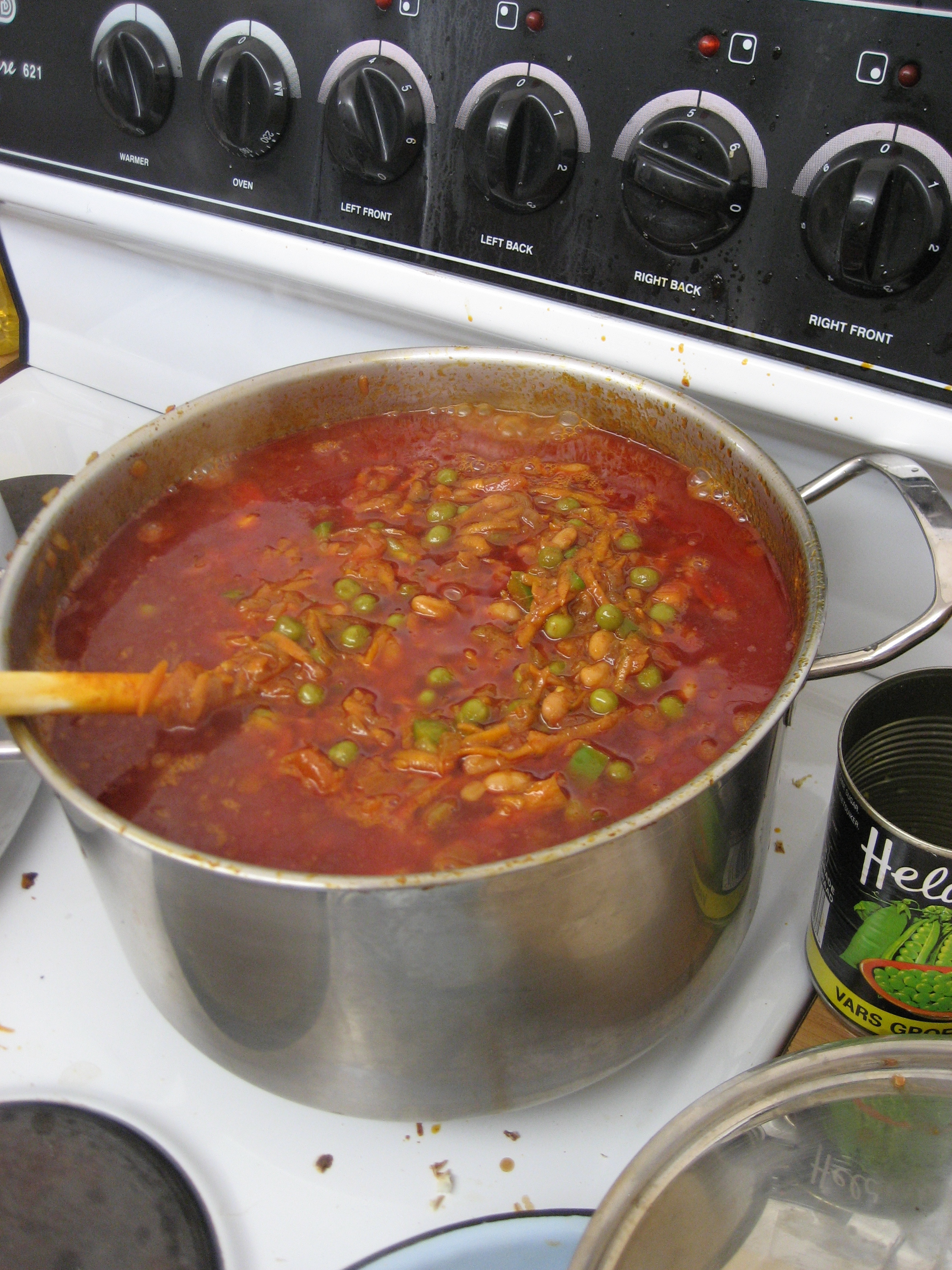
Chakalaka

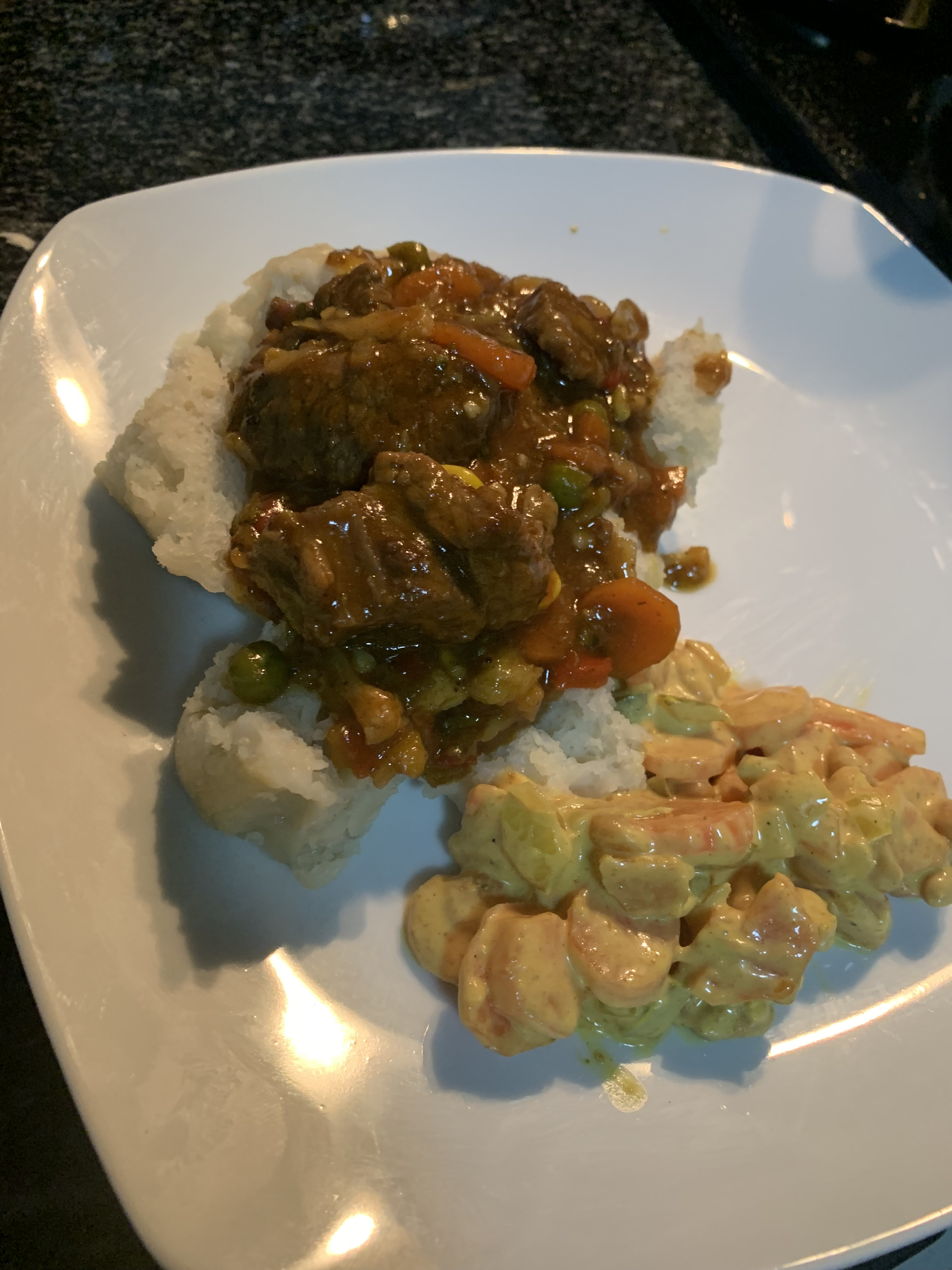
Chakalaka served with stew

Chakalaka is a South African vegetable relish, usually spicy, that is traditionally served with bread, pap, samp, stews, or curries. Chakalaka is said to have originated in the townships of Johannesburg or in the gold mines surrounding Johannesburg, when Mozambican mineworkers leaving their shift cooked tinned produce (tomatoes, beans) with chili to produce a spicy Portuguese-style relish to accompany pap. Many variations of Chakalaka exist, depending on region and family tradition. Some versions include beans, cabbage and butternut squash. For example, canned baked beans, canned tomatoes, onion, garlic, and curry paste can be used to make the dish.

It is frequently served at a braai (barbecue) or with a Sunday lunch. It can be served cold or at room temperature. It is also served at eateries and supermarket delis that have traditional South African or Botswana menu.

== See also ==
- Indian pickle
- List of African dishes
- South African cuisine

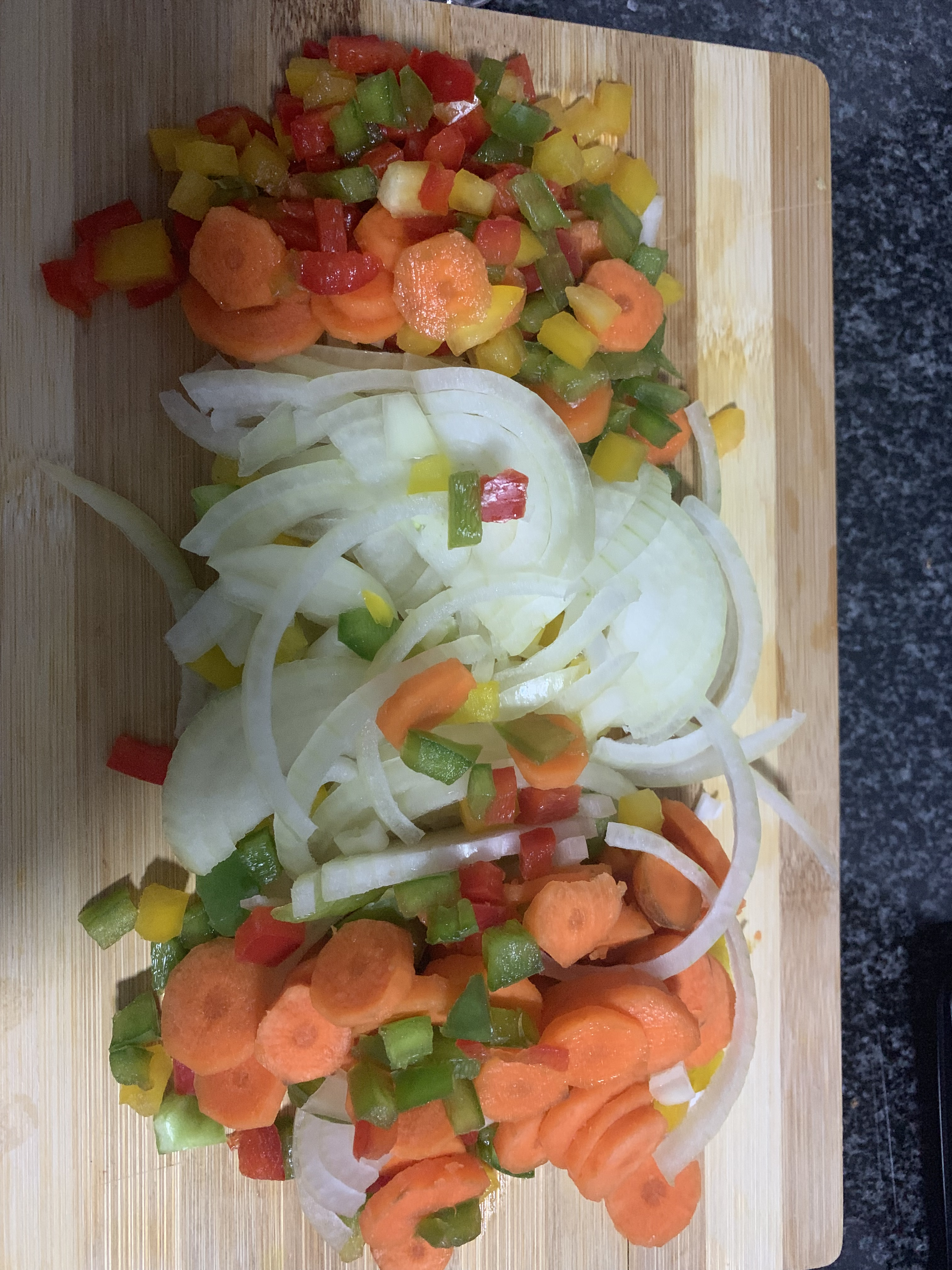
Chakalaka vegetables
