= Democracy sausage =

Fund-raising food during Australian elections

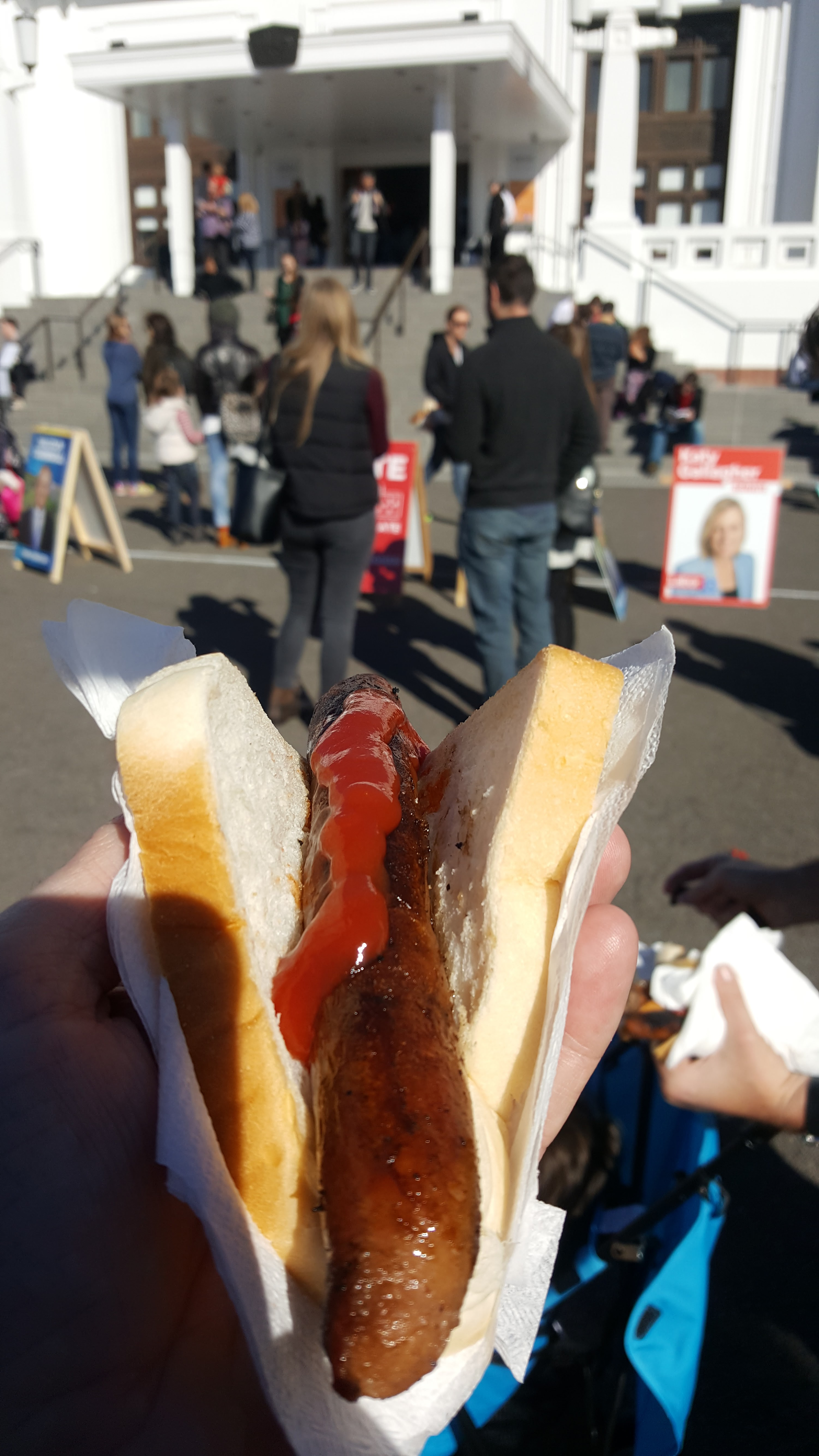
A sausage in bread at a polling booth in front of Old Parliament House, Canberra, during the 2016 federal election

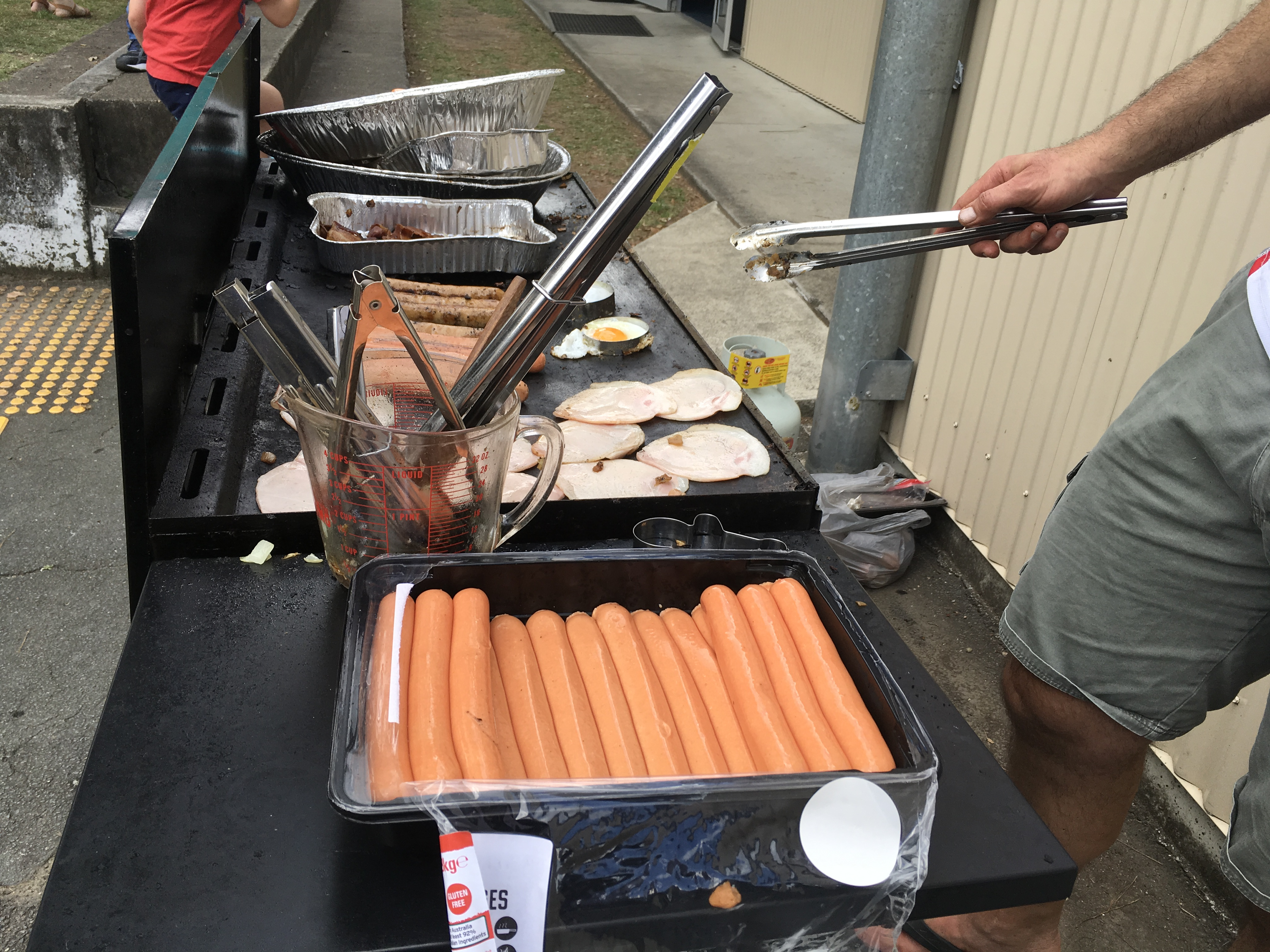
Democracy sausages being barbecued at the polling booth at Kenmore State School in the electoral district of Moggill at the 2017 Queensland state election

Democracy sausages are sausages wrapped in slices of bread bought from a sausage sizzle operated as a fundraiser at many Australian polling places on election day, often to raise money for the institutions that host the polling place (such as schools, churches and community centres). In 2016, 1,992 polling booths (just under one-third of those across Australia) had a sausage stand by the count of the Election Sausage Sizzles website.

Fundraising stalls have been present at polling booths since at least the 1920s, there being a photograph showing a cake stall in front of a booth at the time. The sale of sausages began appearing in the early 1980s as portable barbecue grills became available. The first use of the phrase "democracy sausage" on social media was in the lead-up to the 2013 Western Australian state election, but the phrase was probably in spoken use before.

In the 2010s, the democracy sausage had become so well recognised in Australian culture that in the 24 hours leading up to the 2 July 2016 federal election Twitter changed its emoji for #ausvotes from a ballot box to a sausage lying on a slice of white bread topped with sauce. In December 2016 the Australian National Dictionary Centre selected "democracy sausage" as its Australian Word of the Year for 2016.

As Australians always vote on a Saturday and voting is compulsory, there is always high voter turnout for both state and federal elections. Many polling places are located at schools, community halls, and churches, with these groups often taking advantage of the large number of people coming to their location by setting up fundraising stalls. For many community groups this is the biggest fundraising event of the year.

Variations on the standard sausage in bread are also available at some election day stalls. Voters can also purchase vegan, vegetarian, or gluten-free alternatives as well as other food items, including cakes and drinks such as coffees. Various websites and social media accounts have been set up to help the public locate which polling booths have stalls and what will be available at them so that they can choose a polling location according to their food choices. At the 2016 federal election, one such site recorded 2301 polling booths as having sausages or cakes available, and another recorded 2094, each of which is over one-third of the total number of booths.

Some cake stalls sell themed sweets which are named as a play on politicians' names such as Alba-Cheesy Cakes (Anthony Albanese); Malcolm Turnovers and Malcolm Turnballs (Malcolm Turnbull); Plebislice (referring to a plebiscite); Jacqui Lambingtons (Jacqui Lambie); Tanya Plibiscuits (Tanya Plibersek); and Richard Di Nutella Fudge (Richard Di Natale).

== See also ==
- Elections in Australia
- Politics of Australia
