= Filipino barbecue =

Filipino grilled skewers

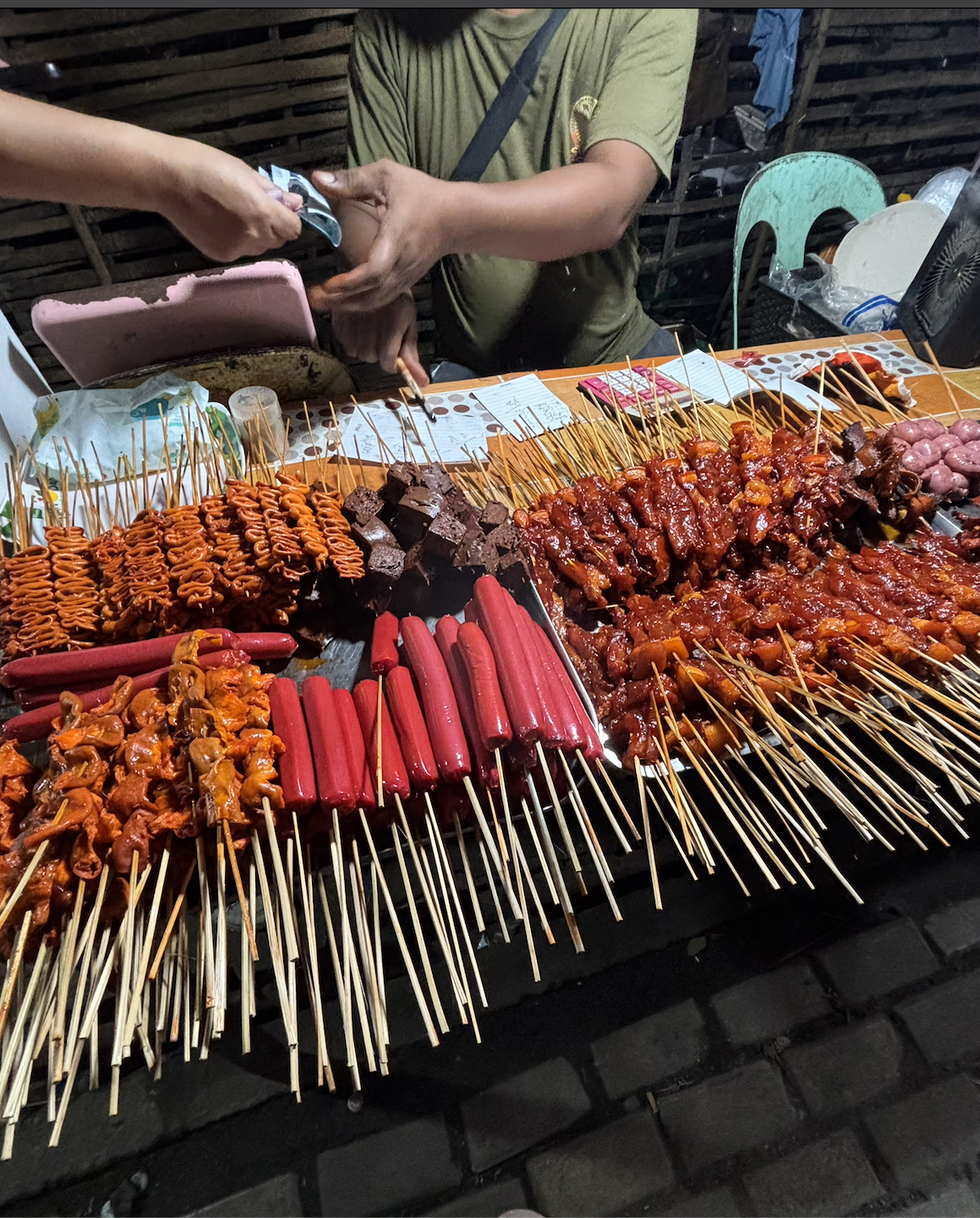
Selection of Filipino barbecue skewers

Filipino barbecue or Pinoy barbecue (Tagalog: ihaw-ihaw, reduplication of 'grill') is a Filipino cuisine variety of skewers (tusok-tusok) that are grilled (inihaw). Entrenched in the street food of the Philippines since the 1950s, Filipino barbecue is quintessentially based on marinated pork, chicken and offal.

== Preparation and consumption ==
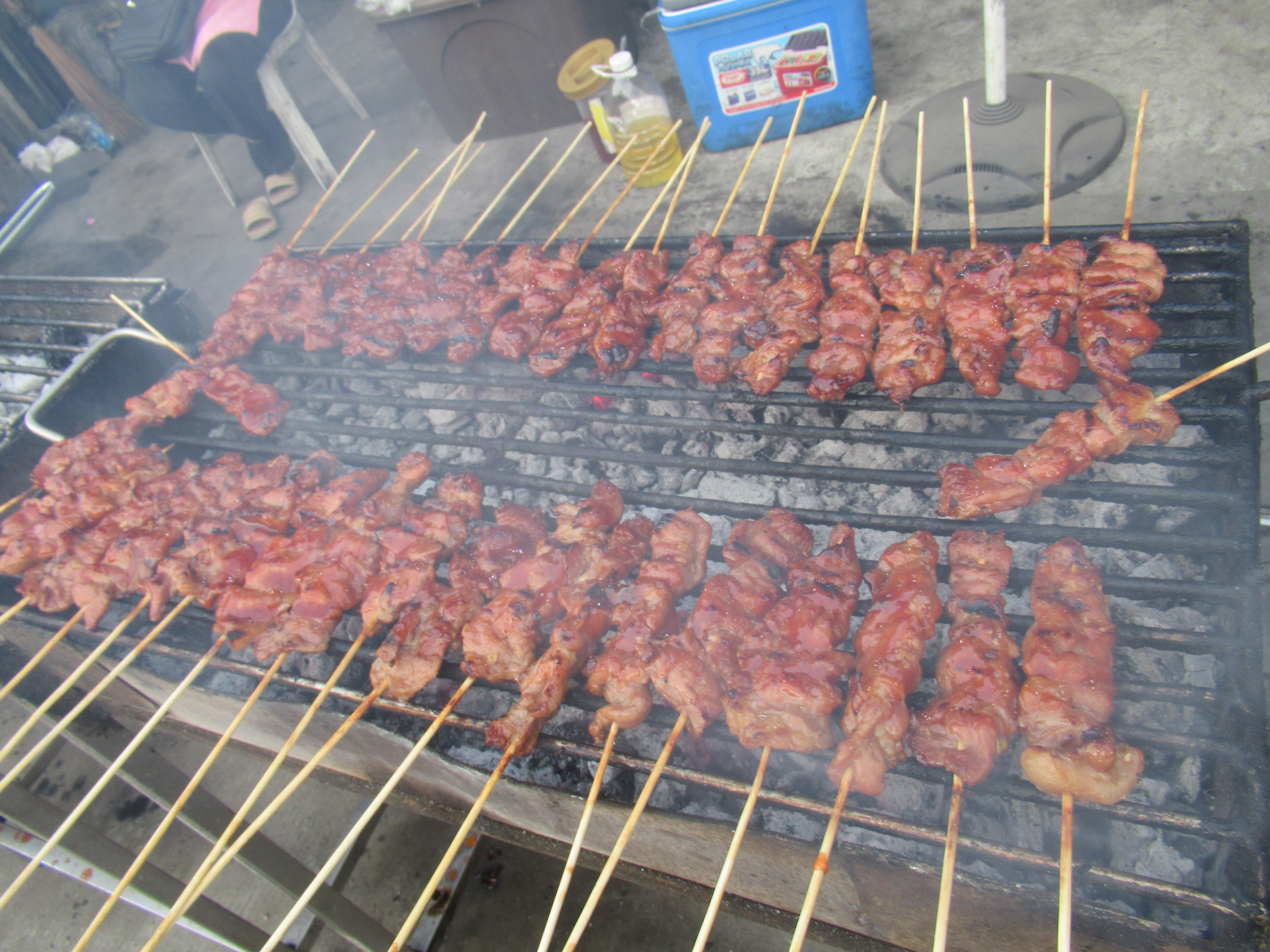
Skewered brochettes of marinated pork (baboy) on a grill

Filipino barbecue is based on a widespread marinade of banana ketchup, calamansi juice, lemon-lime soda (classically 7-Up), and soy sauce. According to Filipino food historian Ige Ramos, the carbonation from the soda is colloquially intended to tenderize tough cuts of meat. The marinated brochettes are skewered and grilled, typically over a charcoal grill moderated with a pamaypay hand fan, with the marinade re-applied during cooking to caramelize.

Filipino barbecue skewers are typically served with atchara, an unripe papaya pickle, along with a vinegar-based sawsawan for dipping. Filipino barbecue is eaten both as a merienda light meal, and as an ulam, or the main component of a Filipino-cuisine meal with rice.

=== Street food ===
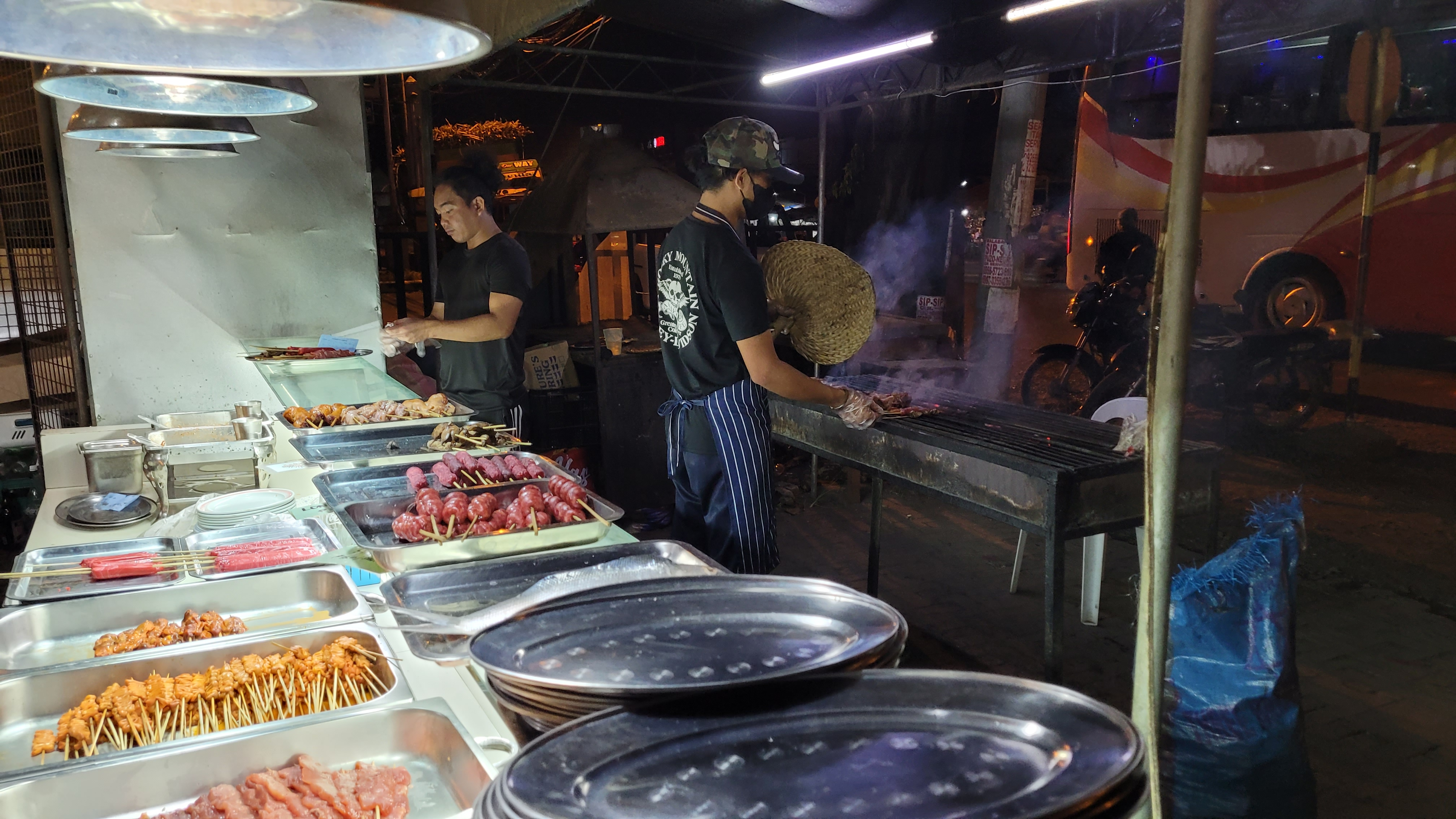
Roadside barbecue food stall (Tagalog: barbecuhan); worker at right uses a sawsawan hand fan

Filipino barbecue is endemic to street food of the Philippines. Food booths specializing in Filipino barbecue (Tagalog: barbecuhan) offer large communal pots of sawsawan to dunk skewers. Carinderias, a variety of Filipino eatery, also serve Filipino barbecue skewers alongside other varieties of inihaw grilled dishes and street foods.

== History ==
Filipino barbecue developed in the 1950s in Metropolitan Manila; according to Filipino chef Jordy Navarra, the style is couched in the charcoal-grilling of rural inihaw. The development of the grilling style may come from the influence of the United States colonization of the Philippines from 1898 to 1946, through which soda, ketchup and American barbecue were introduced in the 1930s. Filipino food historian Ige Ramos opines that the precursor to the standard marinade of Filipino barbecue was created by combining imported American foods, to cherish and maximize their perceived value. During World War II in the Philippines, banana ketchup was invented as an ersatz good that defined the nascent Filipino barbecue marinade after the war.

Chicken and pork prime cuts along with grilled squid (inihaw na pusit) were the skewers of choice from the 1950s until the 1969 Philippine balance of payments crisis. The continued economic hardships in the Philippines of the 1970s during the Marcos dictatorship drove increasingly impoverished Filipinos to eat cheaper offal cuts as poverty food. By the early 1990s, Filipino barbecue with its modern offal skewers had become entrenched as a street food, sold during the day on streets in both urban and suburban contexts, as well as at night markets alongside ukay-ukay stalls. The slang terms for various offal skewers were largely established by this time; Filipino food historian Doreen Fernandez opined that the humorous, euphemistic names were an expression of how offal barbecue skewers were seen as a 'lesser' snack - a pantawid-gutom - as opposed to a primal cut skewer, which could constitute an ulam main meal-portion.

== List of varieties ==
Variety (Note: Tagalog language names may be further defined by a preceding "inihaw na" ('grilled').)	Slang	Ingredients	Ref.
Atay ng baboy		Pork liver	
Atay ng manok		Chicken liver	
Balúmbalúnan (balun-balunan)		Gizzard	
Bato ng baboy		Pork kidney	
Botsi		Chicken crop	
Dugo	Betamax	Blood curd	
Hotdog		Hot dog	
Isaw ng baboy (tumbóng); Cebuano: ilogon	Mag wheels	Pork chitterlings (bung)	
Isaw ng manok	IUD	Chicken chitterlings	
Kurbata	Necktie	Chicken esophagus	
Paa ng manok	Adidas	Chicken feet	
Pakpak ng manok	PAL (Philippine Airlines)	Chicken wings	
Pork mask	Tagalog: Maskara	Pork jowl and other parts of the head	
Proven		Chicken proventriculus	
Pusit		Squid as food	
Puso na manok	Spanish: corazon	Chicken heart	
Pwet na manok	Tagalog: Wetpak, transl. butt	Chicken tail	
Tenga ng baboy	Walkman	Pig's ears	
Ulo ng manok	Helmets	Chicken heads or combs	

== See also ==
- Filipino lechon
- Lechon manok
- Satay
- Anticucho
- Burmese pork offal skewers
- Kushiyaki
- Stigghiola
