= Weasand (disambiguation) =

Weasand is a term for the oesophagus.

Weasand may also refer to:

- Weasand clip, a device in meatpacking for closing off the weasand
- Weasand (comics), a minor adversary of Batman
- A geographical term denoting a narrow place
  - Weasand of Cados, a fictional location in Tales of Vesperia
