= Chaudin =

Meat dish from Louisiana, U.S.

Chaudin (from the French word for stomach), also referred to as ponce or Southern Louisiana Ponce, is a meat dish from southern Louisiana, US, (primarily the southwestern portion of the state). It is a sausage-like variant made from ingredients sewn up in a pig's stomach. The stuffing includes spices, pork, rice (or it can be served over rice) and vegetables including onions and peppers. It can be prepared in a Dutch oven, crock pot, or baked in an oven and is often sold smoked. It is often made with a Holy Trinity Gravy, a roux with brown chopped onion, bell pepper, celery and garlic in water, broth or wine.

Traditional in Cajun cuisine, it is listed on the Ark of Taste. It is served sliced and can be eaten cold or reheated.

== See also ==
- Haggis
- Saumagen
- Hog maw
- List of smoked foods
- List of stuffed dishes
