= Weasand =

Esophagus as food

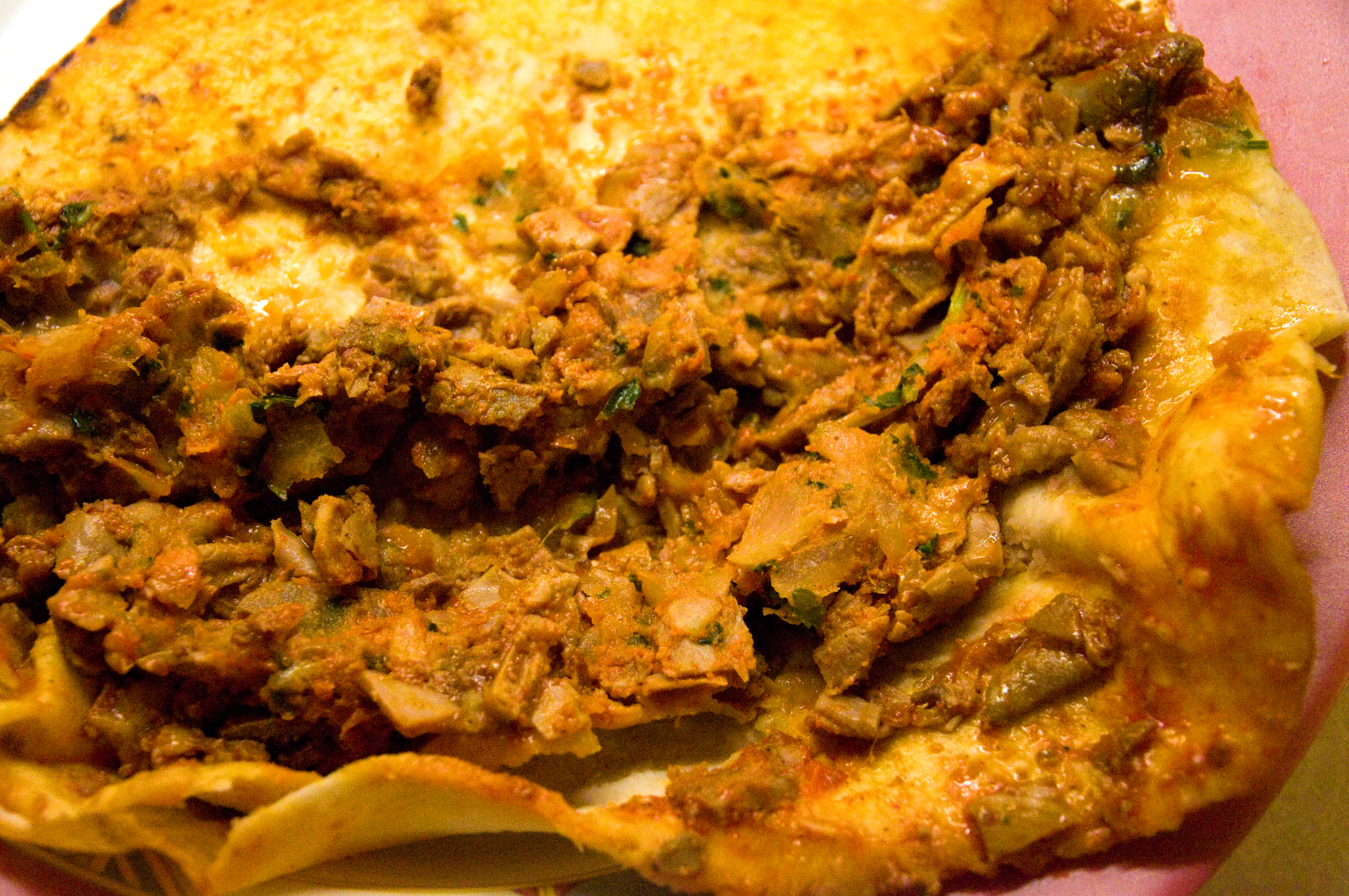
Deep-fried pork weasand (Spanish: buche) in a burrito, unwrapped; El Paso, Texas

Weasand (British English; also gullet) is the esophagus as offal. The esophagus of birds as offal is typically defined by and referred to as the crop, a large pouch connected to the esophagus prior to the digestive organs.

== Description and preparation ==
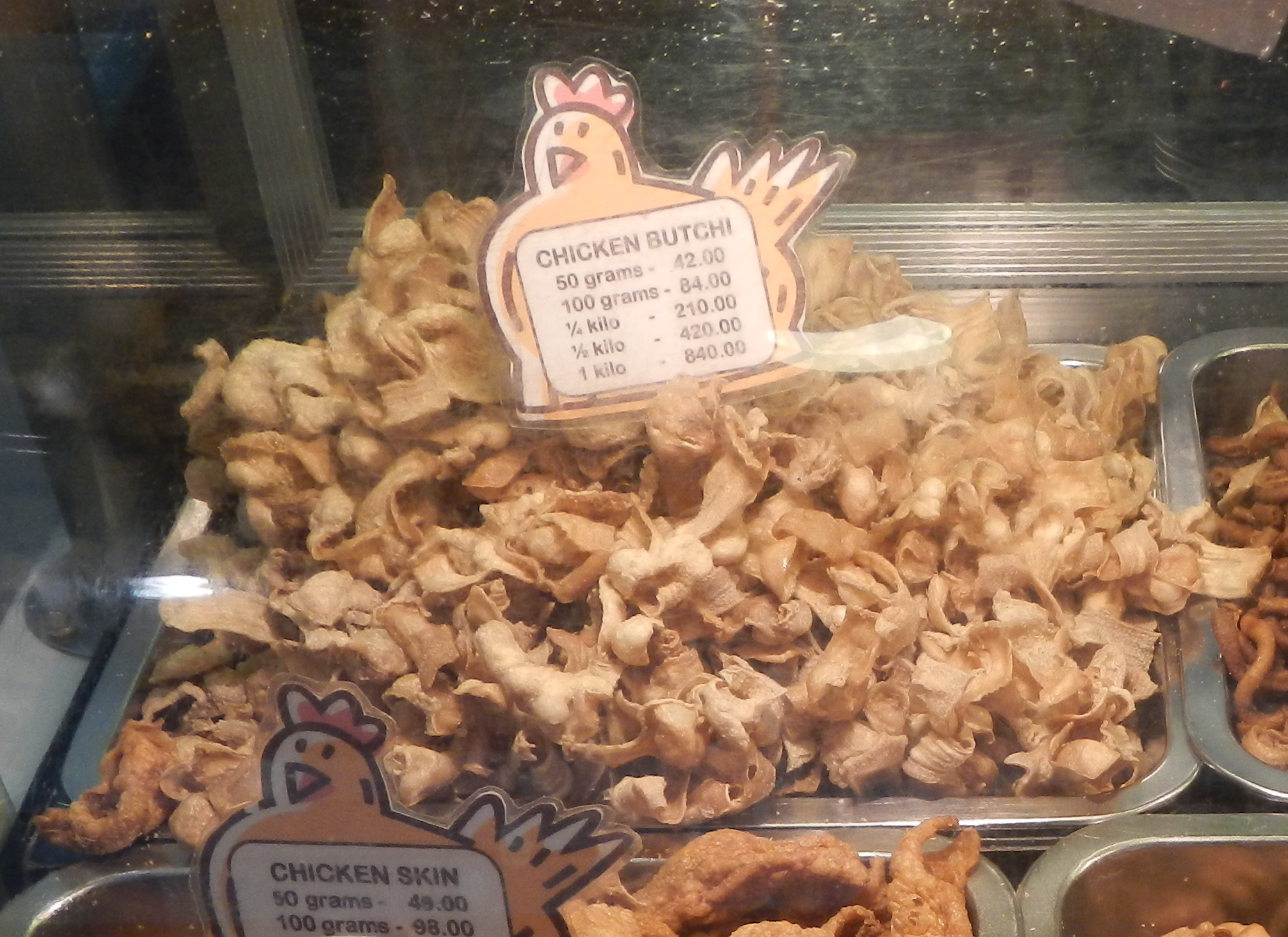
Fried chicken crops (butcherons), Bulacan, Philippines

The meat of the weasand is the smooth muscular layer on the outside of the mucous membrane, running from the larynx to the stomach. Weasand is part of the traditional definition of 'pluck' along with the heart, liver, lungs as food and trachea, referring to how the group of offal organs is 'plucked' from the carcass after severing the diaphragm.

The scraped and cleaned submucosa of lamb and beef weasands can be used as sausage casings. Beef weasand casings are typically 0.6 metres (2 ft) long.

== List of dishes ==
- Burmese pork offal skewers include pork weasand.
- In Japanese horumonyaki (a variety of yakiniku), beef and pork weasand (nekutai lit. 'necktie' (gairaigo), nodosuji, shikin) is an uncommon cut cooked rare. The trachea (fuegarami, urute) is cooked and eaten separately, typically tenderized by scoring.
- In Filipino street food cuisine, chicken crops (Tagalog: botsi, buchi, butchi, butse) are fried as chicharons (Tagalog: butcheron), eaten both as a street food and given as gifts as a pasalubong. Crops are also served skewered and grilled by food stalls as Filipino barbecue.
- In Japanese yakitori, chicken esophagus (Japanese: さえずり, romanized: saezuri) is grilled on skewers (kushiyaki). The esophagus included with the thymus of the chicken neck (sweetbread) is also a distinct cut, called otafuku.
- In Mexican cuisine, pork weasand is grouped with hog maw and chitterlings as "buche". Buche is stewed down and used as a taco and burrito filling.

== See also ==
- Hog maw
- Tripe
- Tongue as food
- Gizzard
- Proventriculus
- Weasand clip
