= Palatine cuisine =

Regional cuisine

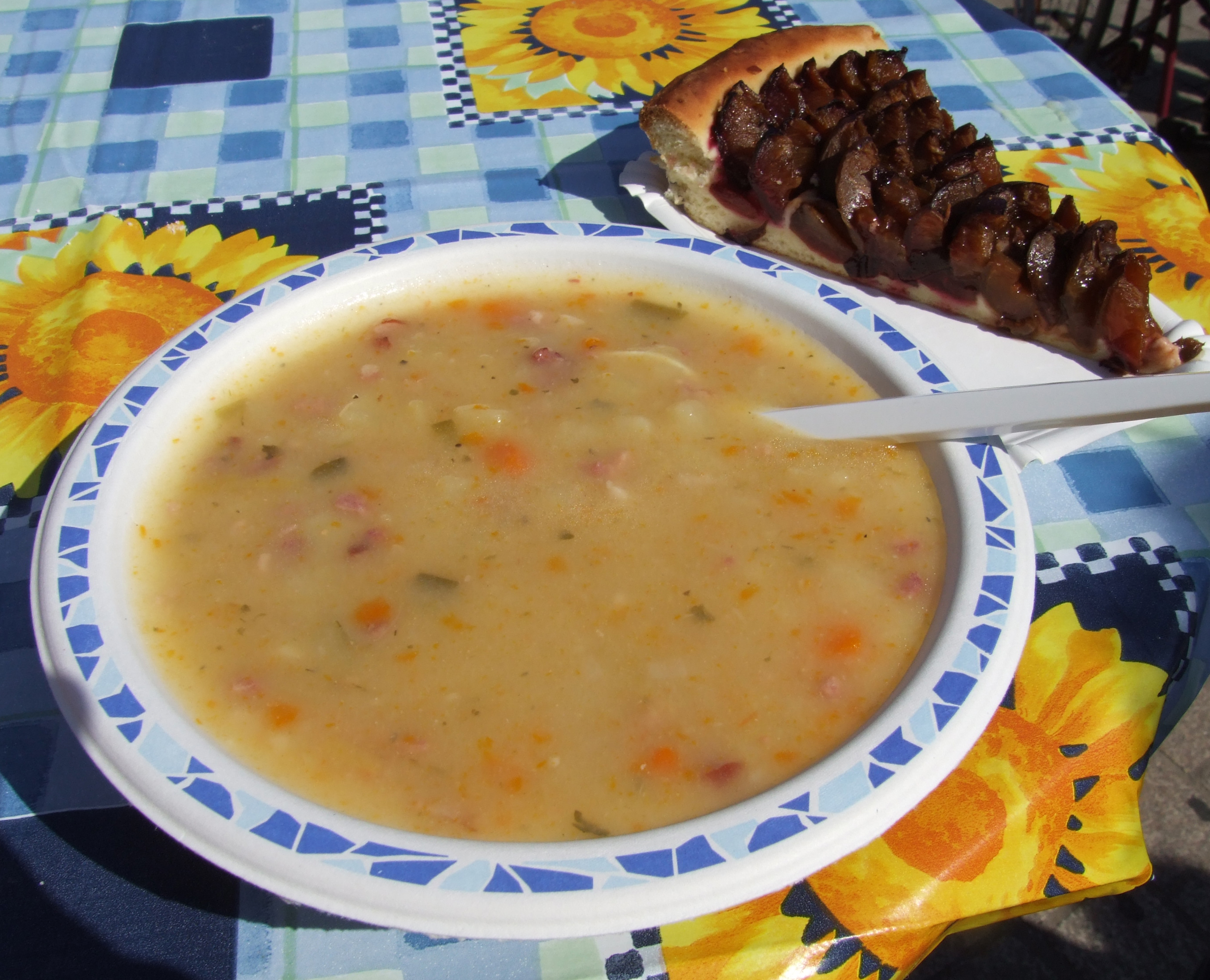
Grumbeersupp un Quetschekuche (potato soup and plum cake)

The cuisine of the Palatinate region of Germany is essentially determined by regional dishes that have become popular throughout the whole region and even beyond.

== General description ==
The traditional Palatine cuisine is in parts very hearty and substantial, mainly because the recipes were developed by the physically hard-working population or in times of poverty. In comparison to other regional German cuisines its dishes are also hotter and spicier. A typical spice used for sausage and potatoes is marjoram.

== Meat ==
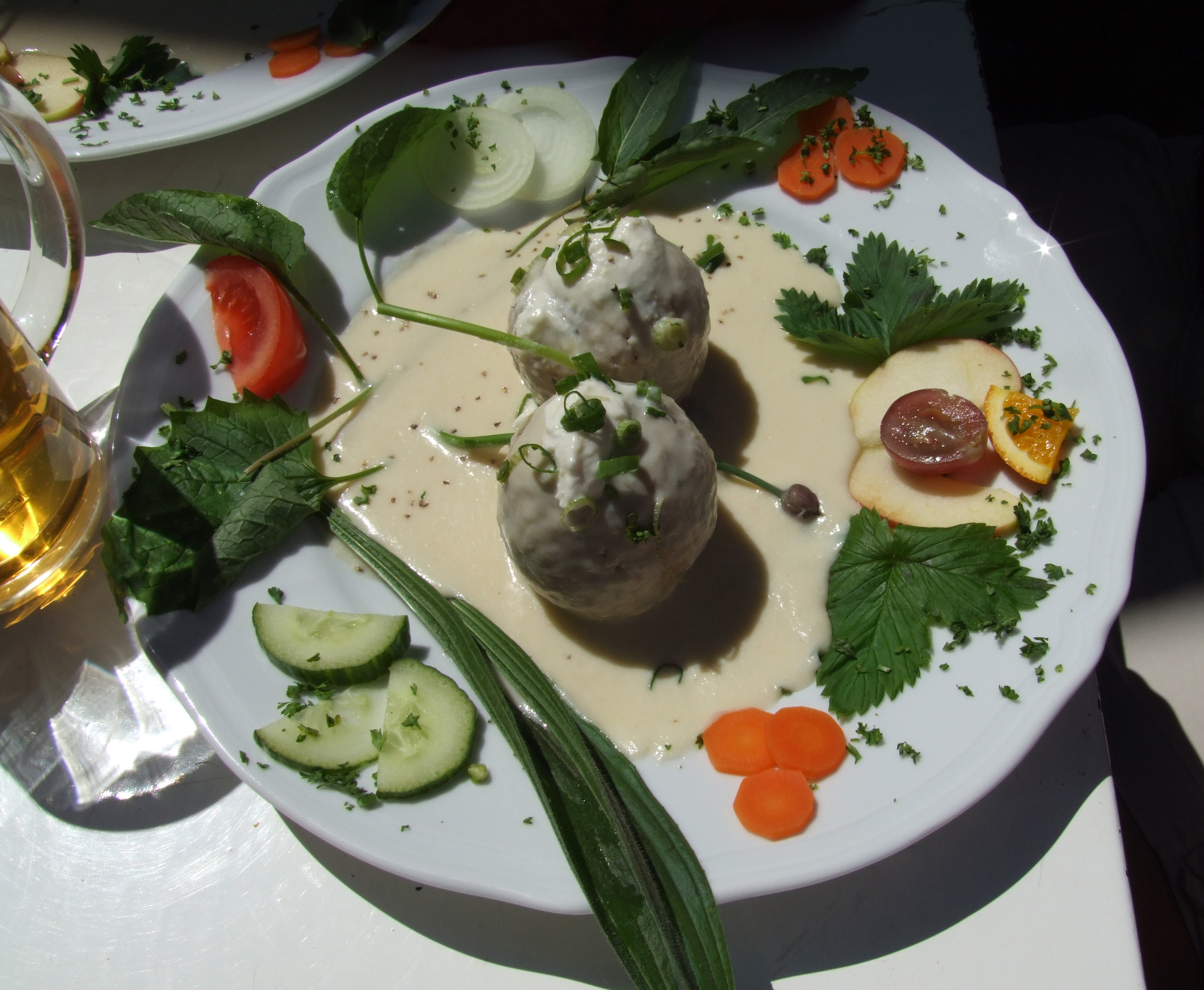
Flääschknepp (meatballs) with horseradish sauce

The most renowned dish from the Palatinate is Saumagen (meaning pig stomach) which is a mixture of lean pork, sausage meat, potatoes, onions, marjoram, cloves and pepper in a casing, traditionally a pig stomach, in which the mixture is simmered. As with most traditional dishes, there are variations with additional ingredients and spices. The finished product is cooled, cut into finger-thick slices and sold at all butchers in the Palatinate region. The slices are fried and usually served with sauerkraut and bread or mashed potatoes, sometimes with brown sauce.

Coarse Bratwürste, liverwurst and blood sausage, liver Knödel and meatballs, the latter most commonly served with a horseradish sauce, are integral parts of the Palatinate cuisine.

Like in neighbouring Alsace, sauerkraut is a typical side dish in all seasons, but especially in winter. Other very common additions to the main dish are mashed potato and brown sauce although many restaurants serve typical rye bread instead of the mashed potato.

Another very famous dish which is of eminent cultural importance is Pfälzer Dreifaltigkeit ("Palatinate Trinity"): it is a combination of the above described Saumagen, the typical Bratwurst and liver Knödel.

== Fish ==
In the Middle Ages numerous little streams running from the Palatinate Forest to the Rhine were impounded by monasteries or peasants in order to create little fish ponds. Although many of these have gone, there are still many traditional restaurants in the middle of the forest whose menus feature a variety of fish. Nowadays, many "modern" varieties of fish are served alongside traditional species like trout, roach, zander, pike and carp.

A second very notable tradition of fish dishes beside the one that was nurtured by fish ponds existed along the river Rhine which was very rich in fish, especially before industrialization. Many men were fishermen and in the city of Speyer there was even a guild for this occupation which caught a variety of fish species, but especially salmon and eel were very important. In the course of the industrialization the Rhine became polluted and many species could not live there, or the fish were no longer edible.

But even after the loss of their own fishing grounds, the population retained its fondness for fish and nowadays there are still many restaurants along the Rhine and the Rhine valley that specialize in fish dishes and many villages still celebrate the traditional fishermen's feasts in which a diverse selection of fish are offered.

== Miscellaneous ==
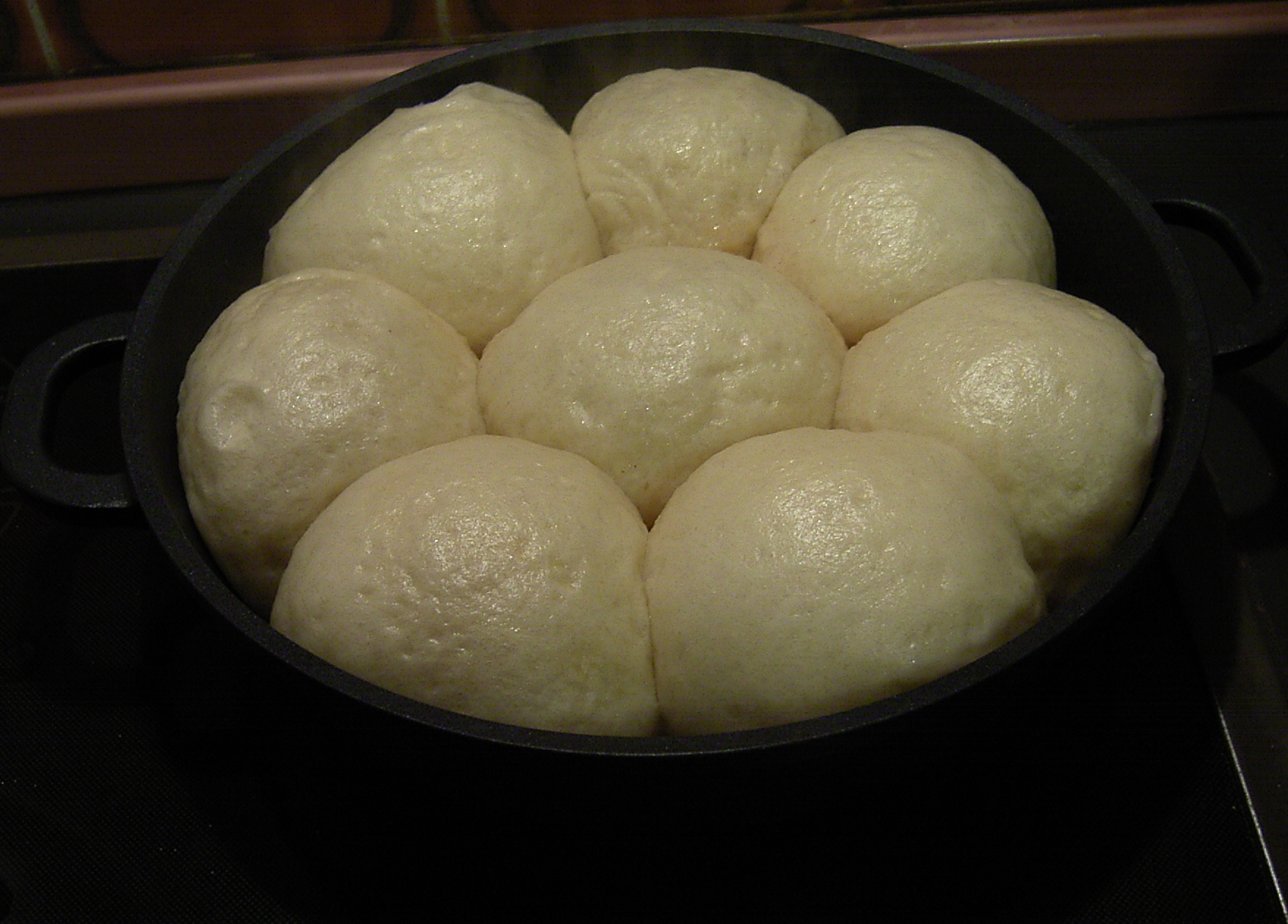
Dampfnudle

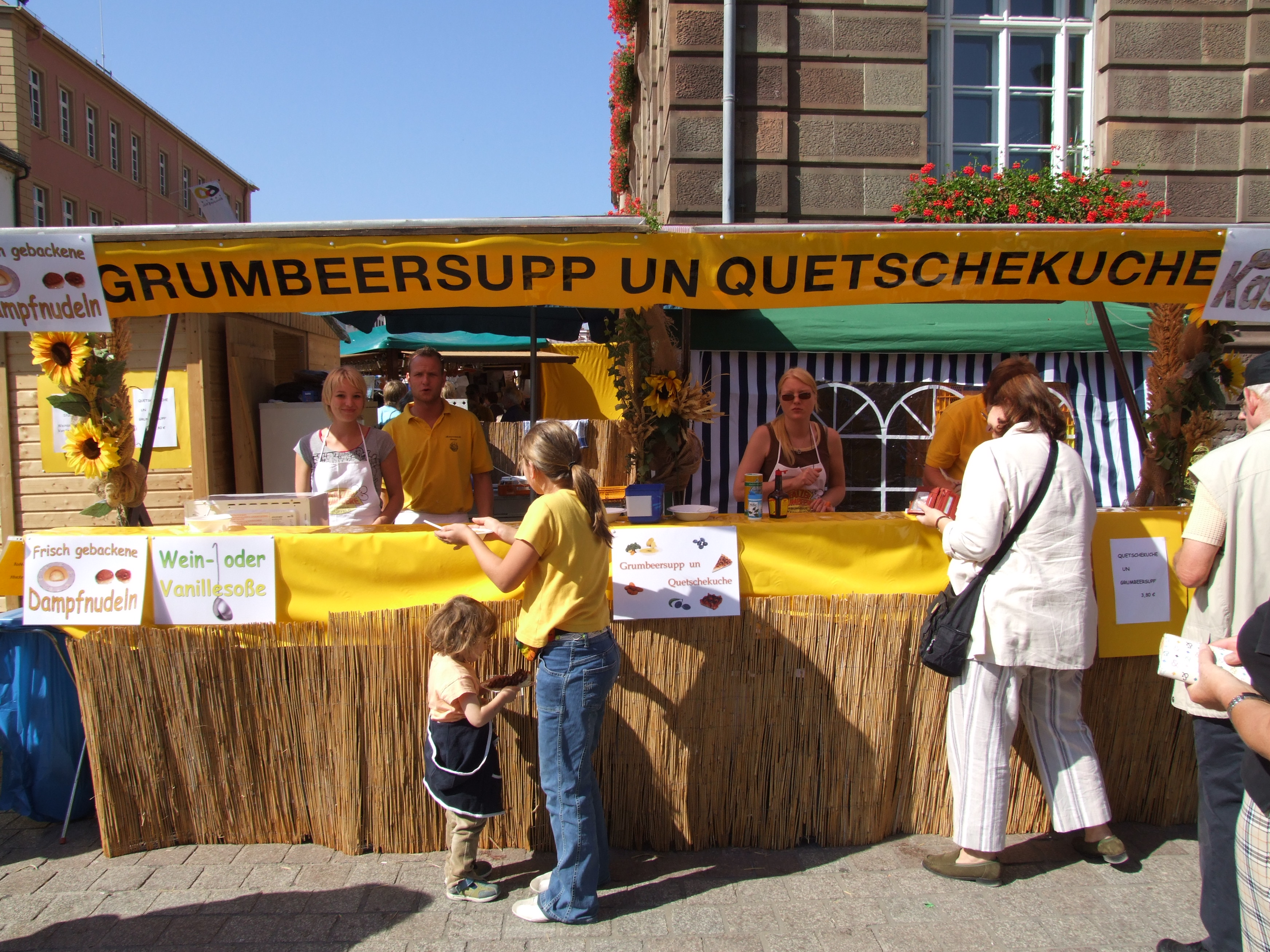
Grumbeersupp und Quetschekuche

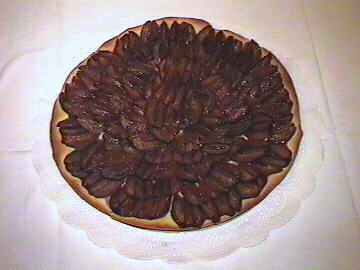
Plum cake

A very famous dish from the Palatinate is Dampfnudeln ("steamed noodles") with a salty crust. It is traditionally a main dish and enjoyed either with sweet side dishes such as wine sauce, vanilla sauce or fruit preserves such as mirabelle, plums or pear or with hearty side dishes like potato soup, vegetable soup or goulash. In some parts of the Palatinate it is even common to eat them as an appetizer with a hearty soup and then with sweet side dishes as the main dish.

During plum season a common main dish is "Grumbeersupp und Quetschekuche" which is potato soup and plum cake and for dessert Kerscheplotzer is served. Another seasonal dish is Zwiebelkuchen which is commonly served with Federweisser in autumn.

Also very frequently eaten are Gebreedelde which is the Palatinate version of baked potatoes with diced bacon or liverwurst. But also boiled potatoes with quark, onions, caraway, pepper or chive are very popular.

A traditional snack which exists mainly because of the working men in vineyards is Weck, Worscht un Woi (bun, meat and wine).

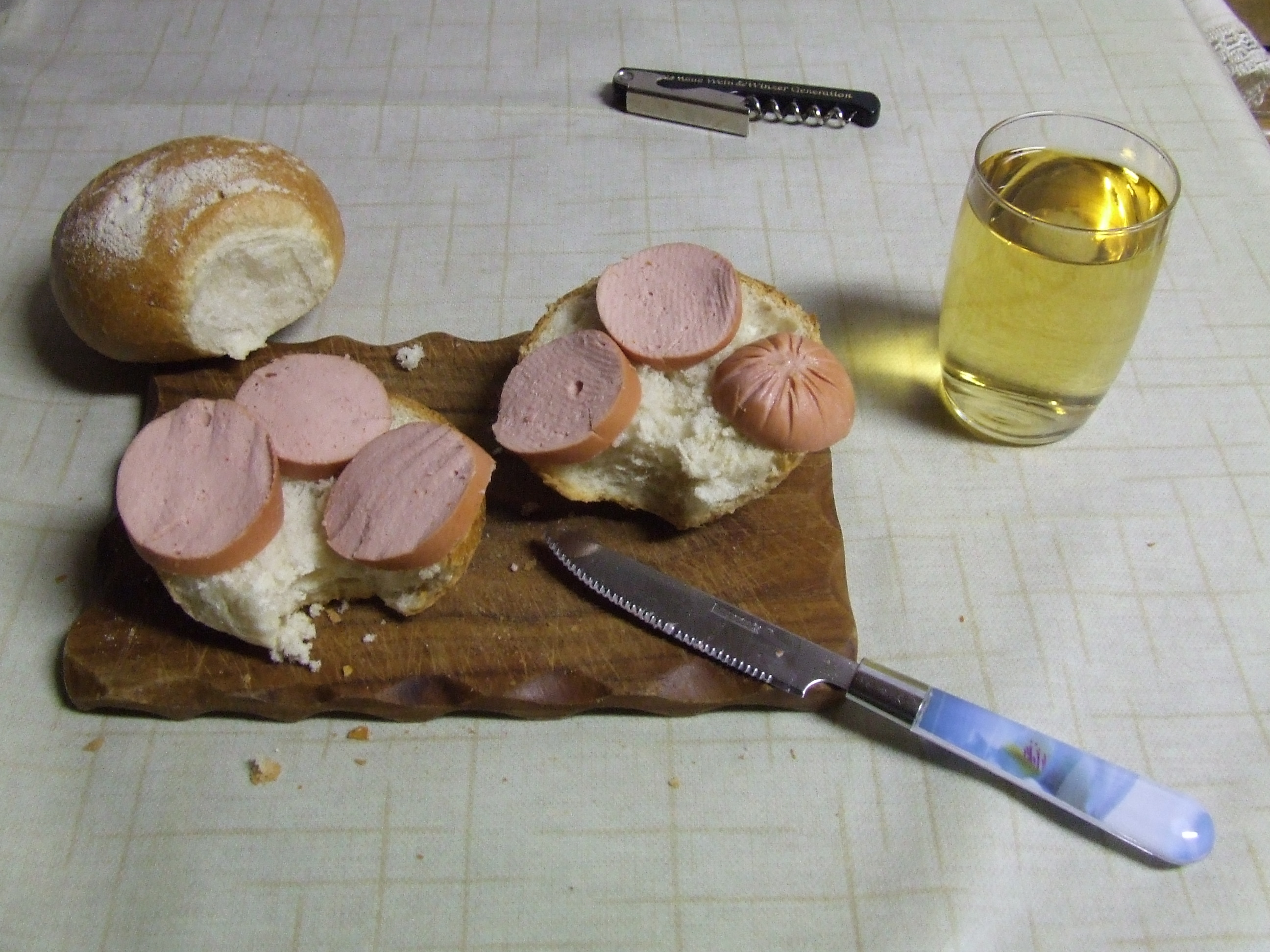
Weck, Worscht un Woi

== Regional differences ==
=== Anterior and South Palatinate ===
The most important product of the agriculture there and also one of the most popular export articles is the wine. It is grown mainly along the Weinstraße where because of its situation at the western edge of the Rhine valley and next to the range of mountains Haardt a very mild climate guarantees optimal conditions. Traditionally white wines are particularly Riesling, Müller-Thurgau, Silvaner and Kerner. Famous red wines are Blauer Portugieser and Dornfelder. The wines are not only important for drinking with meals but are also frequently used as an ingredient in sauces or desserts.

As many chestnut trees are growing in the Haardt the cuisine of this region features many chestnut dishes especially during autumn and Christmastime. They are preferably served with game, duck or rabbit which is also the traditional way of eating them but in recent years the cooks of sophisticated restaurants adapted many chestnut dishes from Italy and France. Important cultivars are vegetables and potatoes in the Vorderpfalz and asparagus in the Rhine valley. Due to the Mediterranean climate there are also almonds, kiwis, citron fruit and figs growing there and therefore the cuisine resembles the cuisines of the Mediterranean states like Italy, Spain and especially France.

The Palatine people's love of good food resembles that of the French and is especially visible in the public festivals and funfairs whose themes are frequently about food or drink. Beside the many wine feasts there are also other culinary specialties highlighted and celebrated such as asparagus in Dudenhofen, pretzel in Speyer, radish in Schifferstadt, Handkäse in Lustadt, potato in Bellheim or the dish Saumagen in Kallstadt.

=== West Palatinate ===
This region's cuisine is even heartier and traditional dishes include:

- Hooriche (meaning "hairy"), little potato balls served with a cream-bacon-sauce
- Schales, a dish consisting mainly of raw shredded potatoes, bacon, onions, and a lot of nutmeg. It is typically baked in a bread pan, and it is often served with apple sauce
- Lakzervelat, a kind of sausage made from cured meat, especially common between Christmas and New Year's Eve
- Anduddel, also a very spicy sausage for stewing.

=== Border to France ===
In the region bordering France, the neighbouring influence is notable. Dishes such as Flammkuchen are very popular and even escargots are common.
