= Horumonyaki =

Japanese dish of beef or pork offal

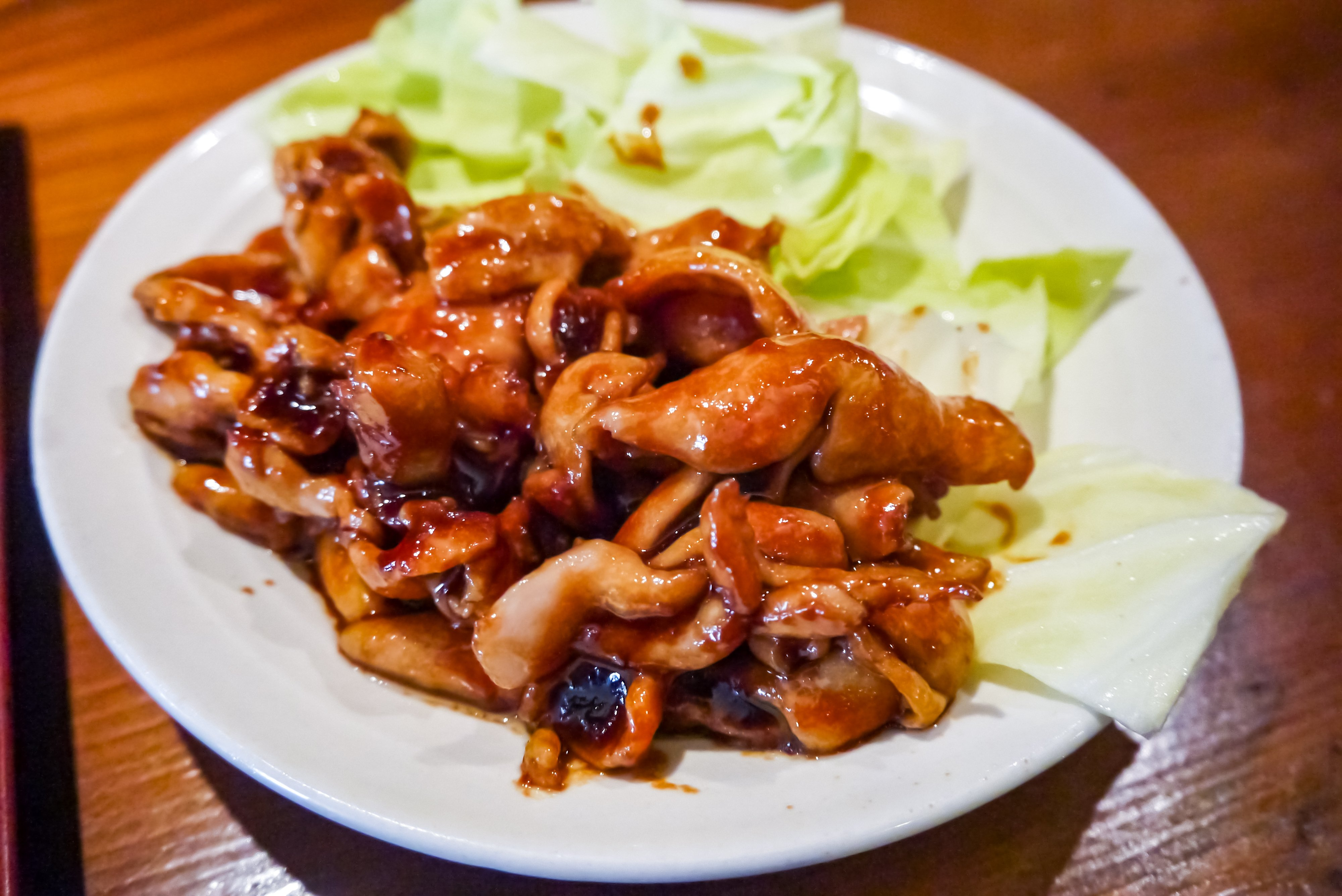
- Horumonyaki
- Place of origin: Japanese
- Associated cuisine: Japanese cuisine
- Main ingredients: Offal

Horumonyaki (Japanese: ホルモン焼き) is a kind of Japanese cuisine made from beef or pork offal. Kitazato Shigeo, the chef of a yōshoku restaurant (one that specializes in Western-derived cuisine) in Osaka, devised this dish and registered a trademark in 1940. It was originally derived from yakiniku. The name horumon is derived from the word "hormone", with the intended meaning of "stimulation", as in the original Greek. Horumonyaki has a reputation for being a "stamina-building" food.

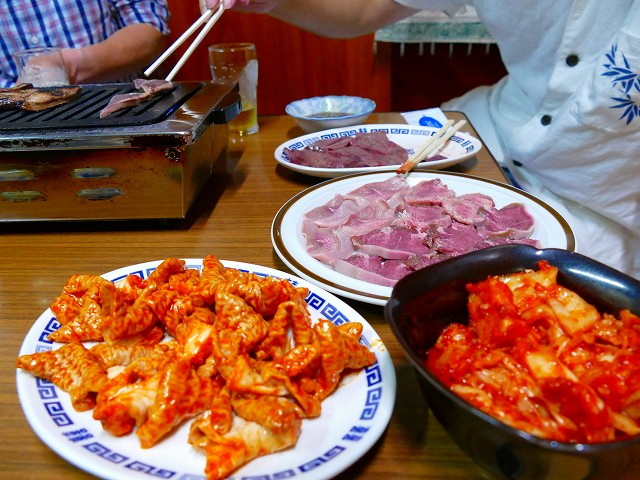
Horumonyaki restaurant in Japan

== Ingredients ==
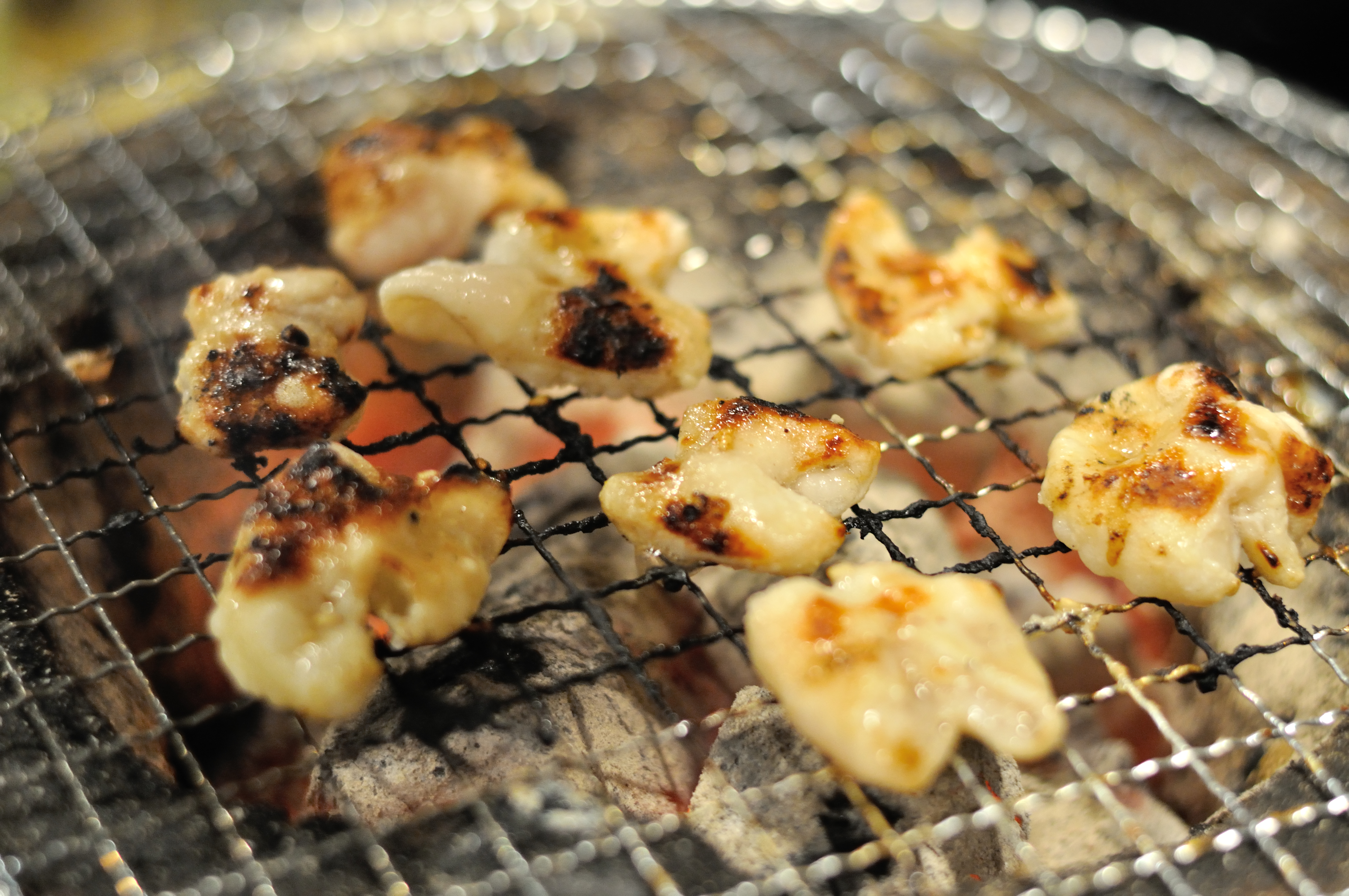

Although horumon may be beef or pork, beef is more commonly used. (Note: Names vary considerably depending on the source animal and also on regional dialect.) Common horumon items include:

- gari: Weasand (esophagus)
- hatsu: heart*
- hatsumoto ("heart-base"): pulmonary artery*
- kobukuro: uterus
- oppai ("teat"): mammary
- rebā: liver
- sagari: diaphragm
- shibire: pancreas
- shiro ("white"): intestine
- teppō ("rifle"): rectum

* although "hearts" would typically be pronounced and written in roman script (romaji) with an elongated "a" sound written as "aa" as in haatsu, in this culinary sense, it is pronounced in Japanese unelongated, hence the one "a".
