= Kushiyaki =

Japanese term for skewered and grilled food

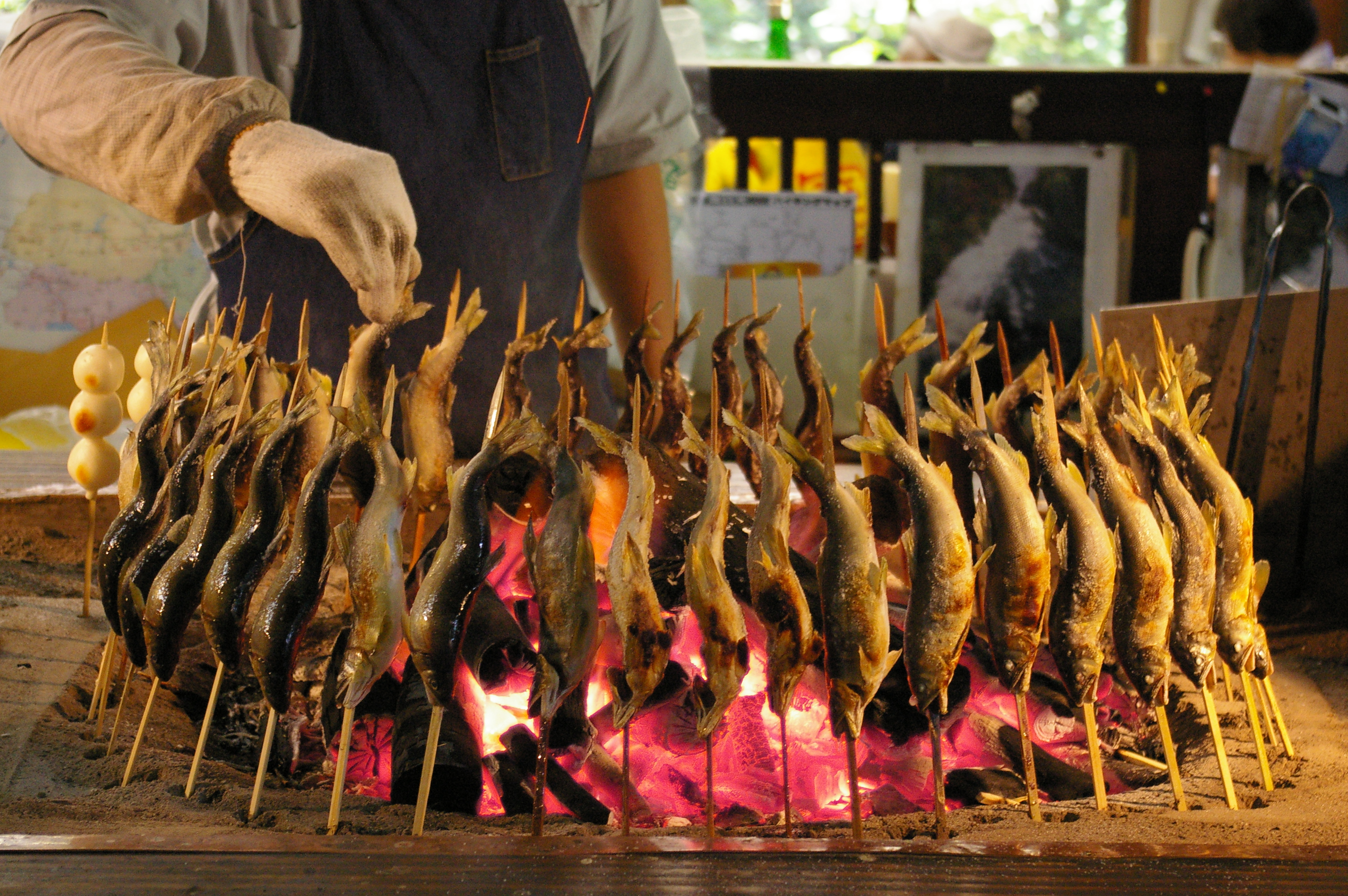
- Ayu being grilled with salt
- Type: Skewered meat
- Place of origin: Japan
- Main ingredients: Beef, pork, seafood, and seasonal vegetables
- Similar dishes: Sate, shish kebab

Kushiyaki (串焼き) is a formal term that encompasses food items skewered and grilled. At times, restaurants group them as kushimono (串物) and yakimono (焼き物).

== Yakitori and kushiyaki ==
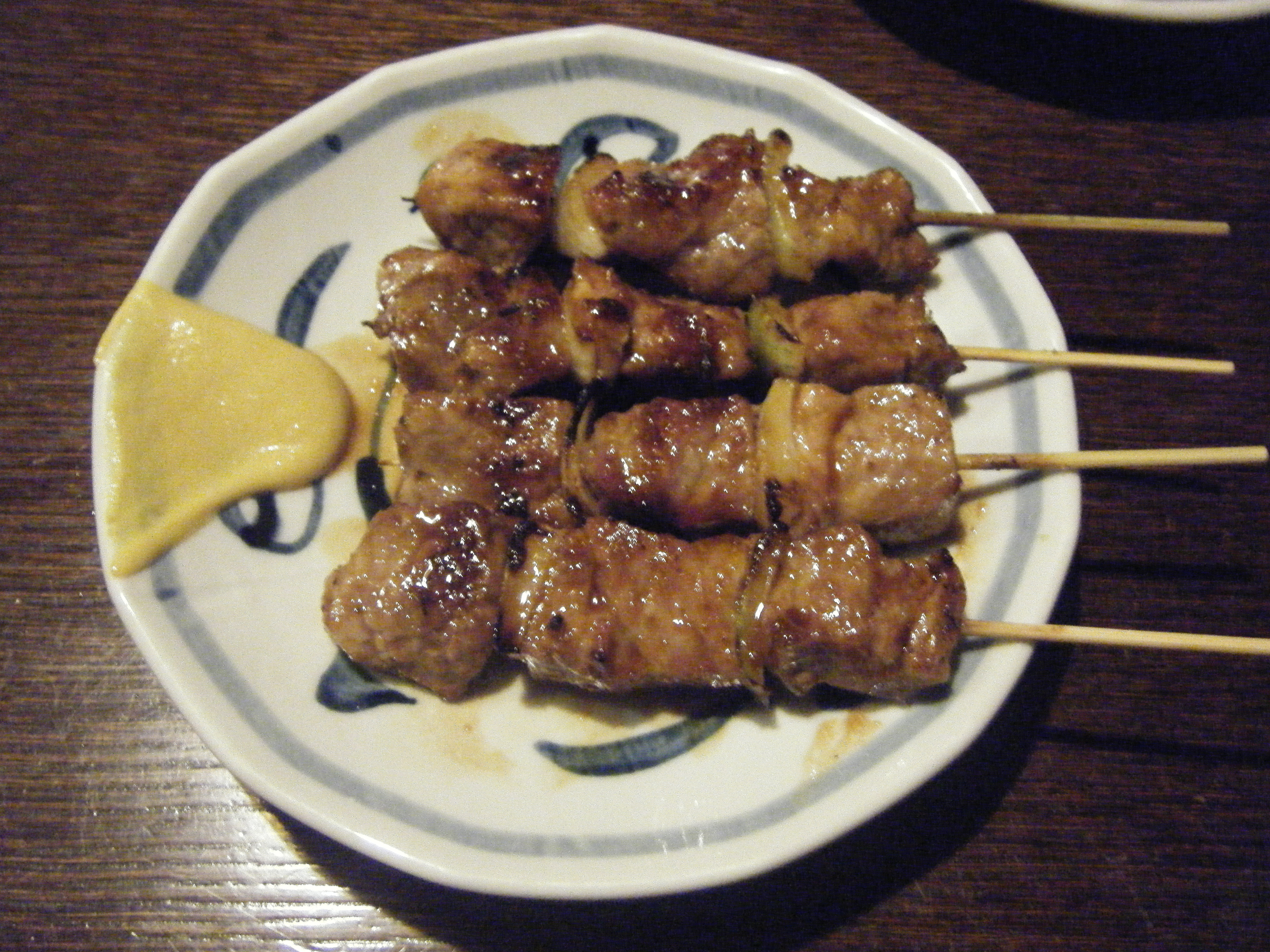
Muroran yakitori is actually pork, not chicken

Both yakitori and kushiyaki are used interchangeably in Japanese society to refer to skewered meat collectively; however, when referring to a specific item, yakitori will not be used unless the primary meat is chicken. While using pork, grilled pork on skewers are cooked with the same sauce as yakitori, and that is why in some areas as Muroran, grilled pork on skewers are called "yakitori", instead of yakiton (やきとん; skewered and grilled pork).

While kabayaki is also skewered and grilled over charcoal, it is rarely categorized as kushiyaki since they are not served on skewers. Fish grilled whole on skewers with salt and served after pulling off the skewer including sea bream (tai) and sweetfish (ayu) is not called kushiyaki but shioyaki ("grilled with salt") at high-end restaurants. At food stalls or yatai, ayu is sold on skewers.

== Variety ==
In order to facilitate even cooking, the ingredient is cut into small, roughly uniform shapes. Skewers or kushi are made with bamboo or Japanese cypress, and shape as well as length varies to use for the type of food: flat skewers are used for minced meat, for example.

Meat
beef (gyūniku), pork meat (butaniku), cartilage (nankotsu) and offal (horumon), horse meat (baniku).
Seafood
sweetfish (ayu), minced and seasoned Atlantic horse mackerel (aji) and sardine (iwashi), prawn and shrimp (ebi), Japanese scallop (hotate), squid and cuttlefish (ika).
Vegetable
onion (tamanegi), eggplant (nasu), cherry tomato, potato, pumpkin (kabocha), scallion (negi), ginkgo nuts (ginnan), green bell pepper (pīman), garlic (ninniku), Japanese pepper (shishitō).
Products and prepared
Tōfu, nattō, steamed rice.

== Seasoning ==
Kushiyaki seasonings are primarily divided among two types: salty or salty-sweet. The salty type usually uses plain salt as its main seasoning. For the salty-sweet variety, tare, a special sauce consisting of mirin, sake, soy sauce, and sugar is used. Other common spices include powdered cayenne pepper, shichimi, Japanese pepper, black pepper, karashi, beni shōga miso, yuzu kosho, and wasabi, according to one's taste.

== Examples ==
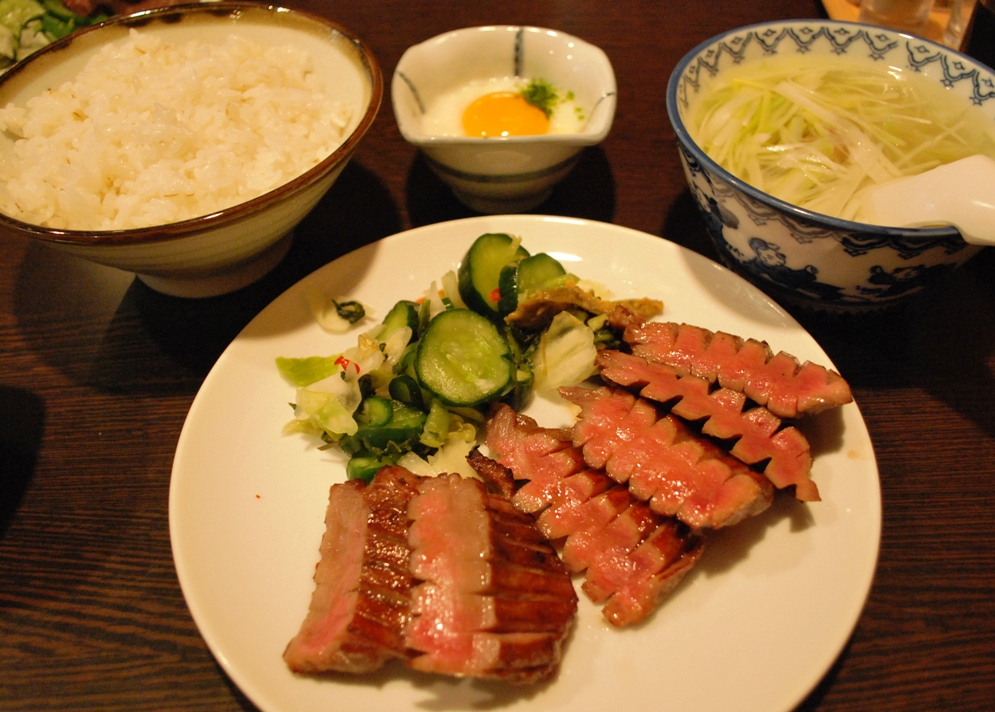
Gyūtan teishoku, a table d'hôte of Gyūtan in Sendai

Products and prepared food are applied for receipt.

- pīman no nikuzume (ピーマンの肉詰め), bell pepper stuffed with minced pork
- tomato no bēkon maki (トマトのベーコン巻き), cherry tomato wrapped with bacon strips
- fukuro (袋), fried thin tofu (aburaage) pouch filled with nattō
- gyūtan (牛タン), beef tongue, sliced thinly
- butabara (豚ばら), pork belly
- atsuage dōfu (厚揚げ豆腐), thicker variety of deep-fried tōfu
- enoki maki (エノキ巻き), enoki mushrooms wrapped in slices of pork
- asuparabēkon (アスパラベーコン), asparagus wrapped in bacon

== Gallery ==
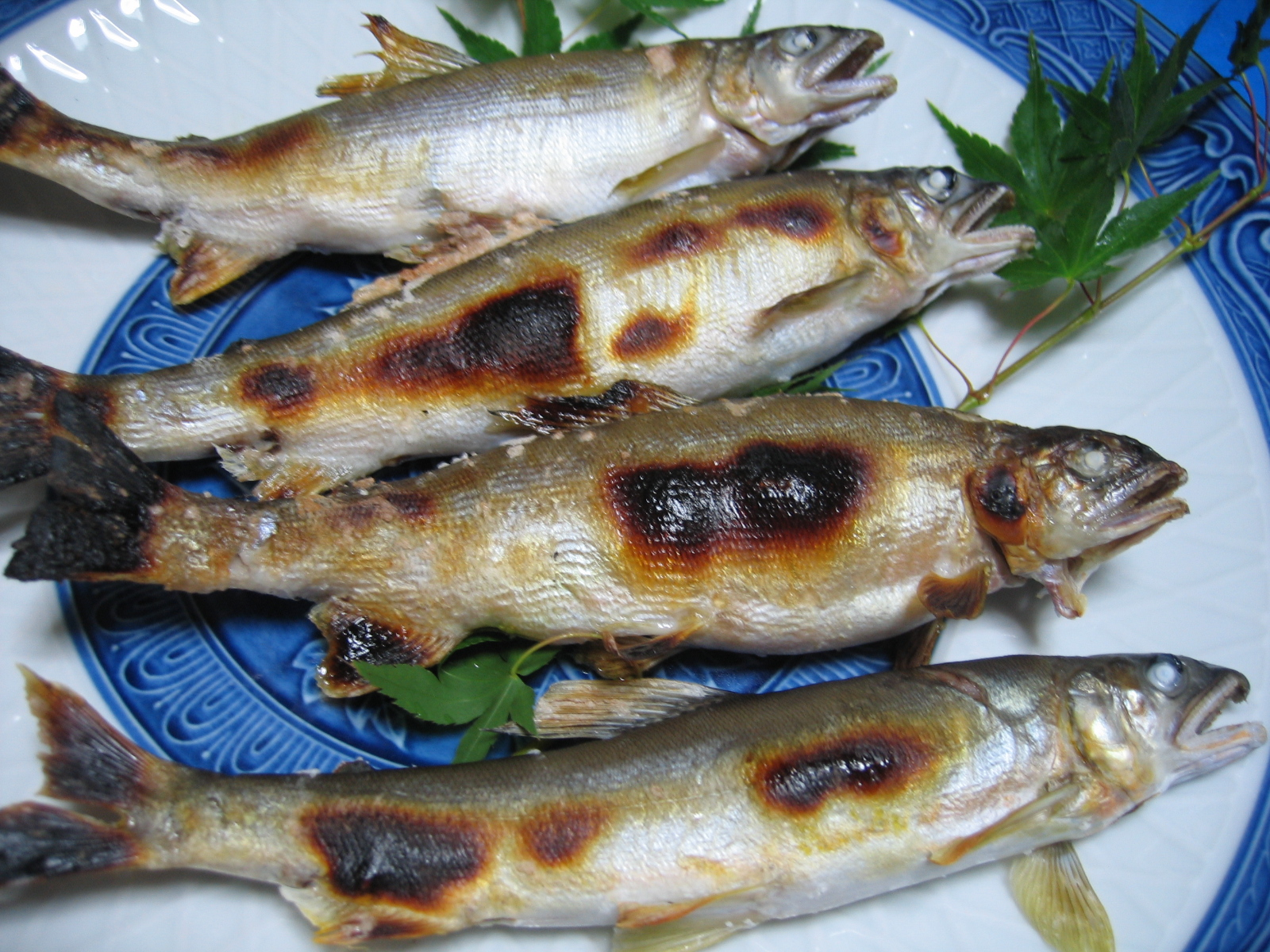
Shioyaki (ayu grilled with salt)

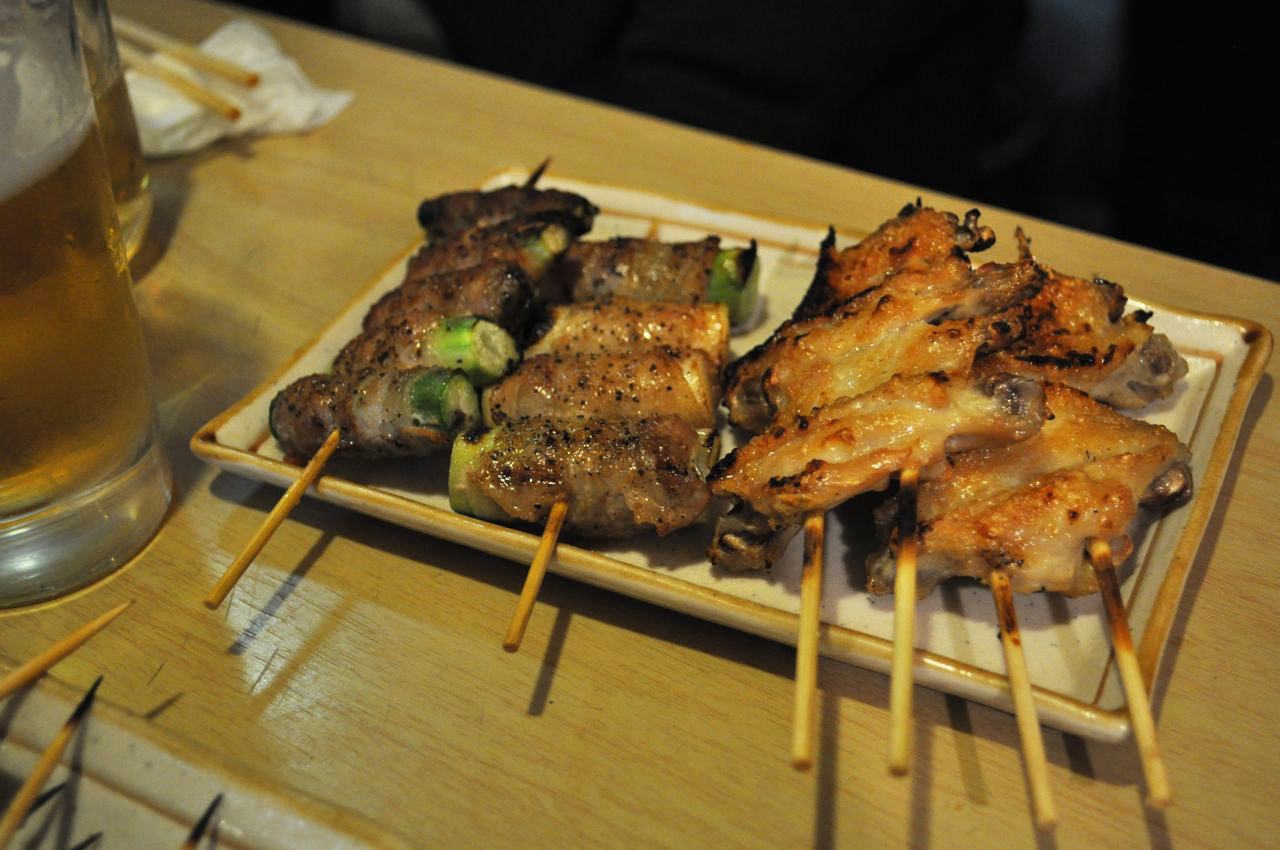
Left: Asuparamaki (asparagus wrapped in thinly sliced pork)

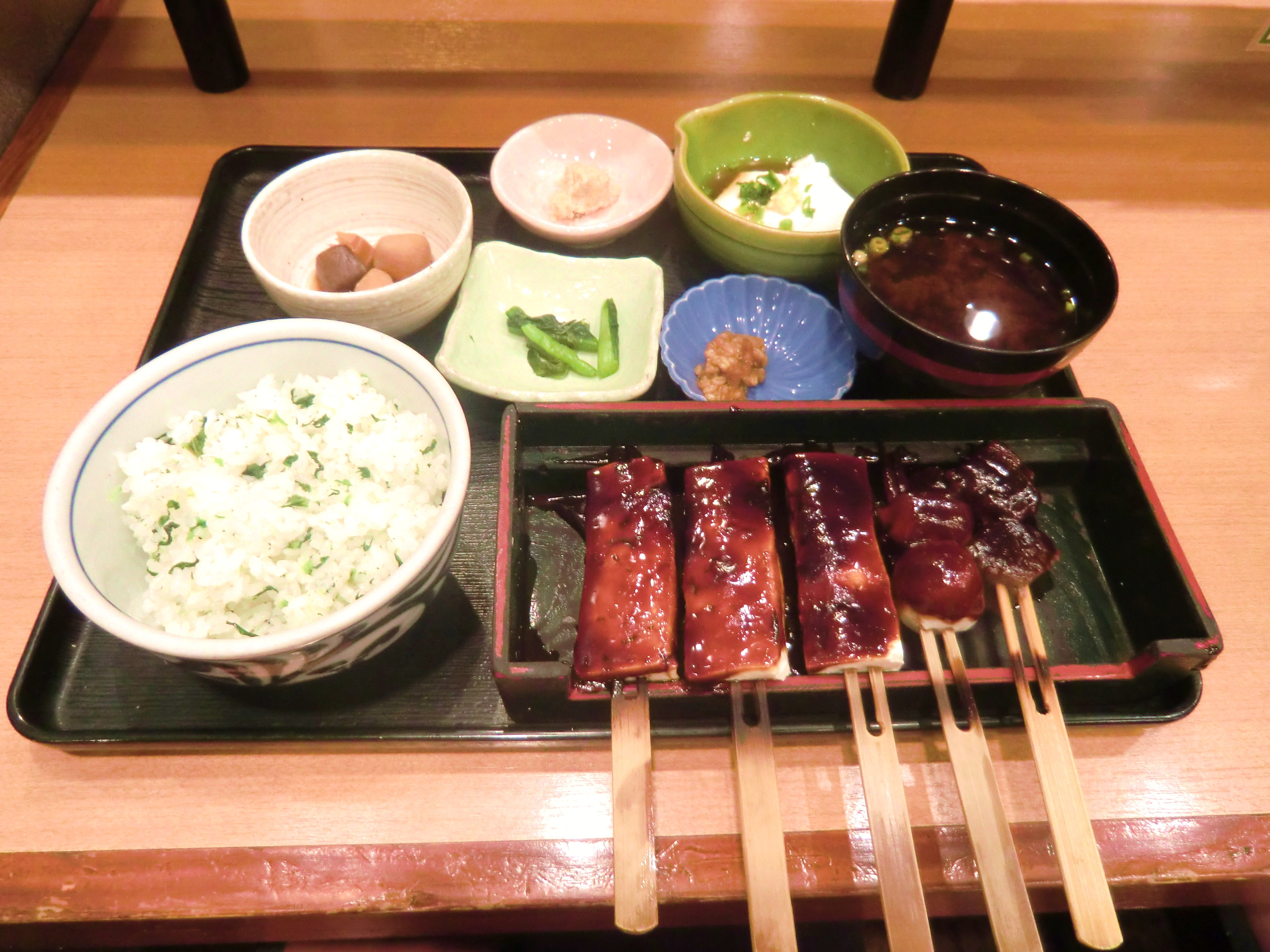
Tōfu dengaku served in teishoku style

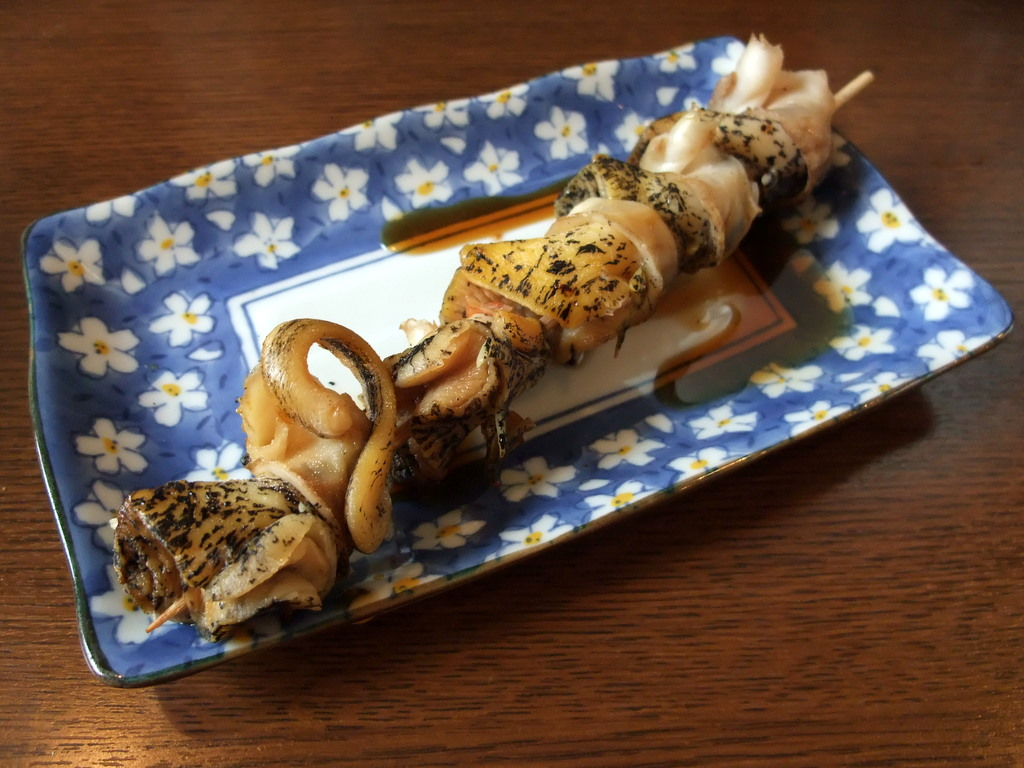
Tsubugai or whelks

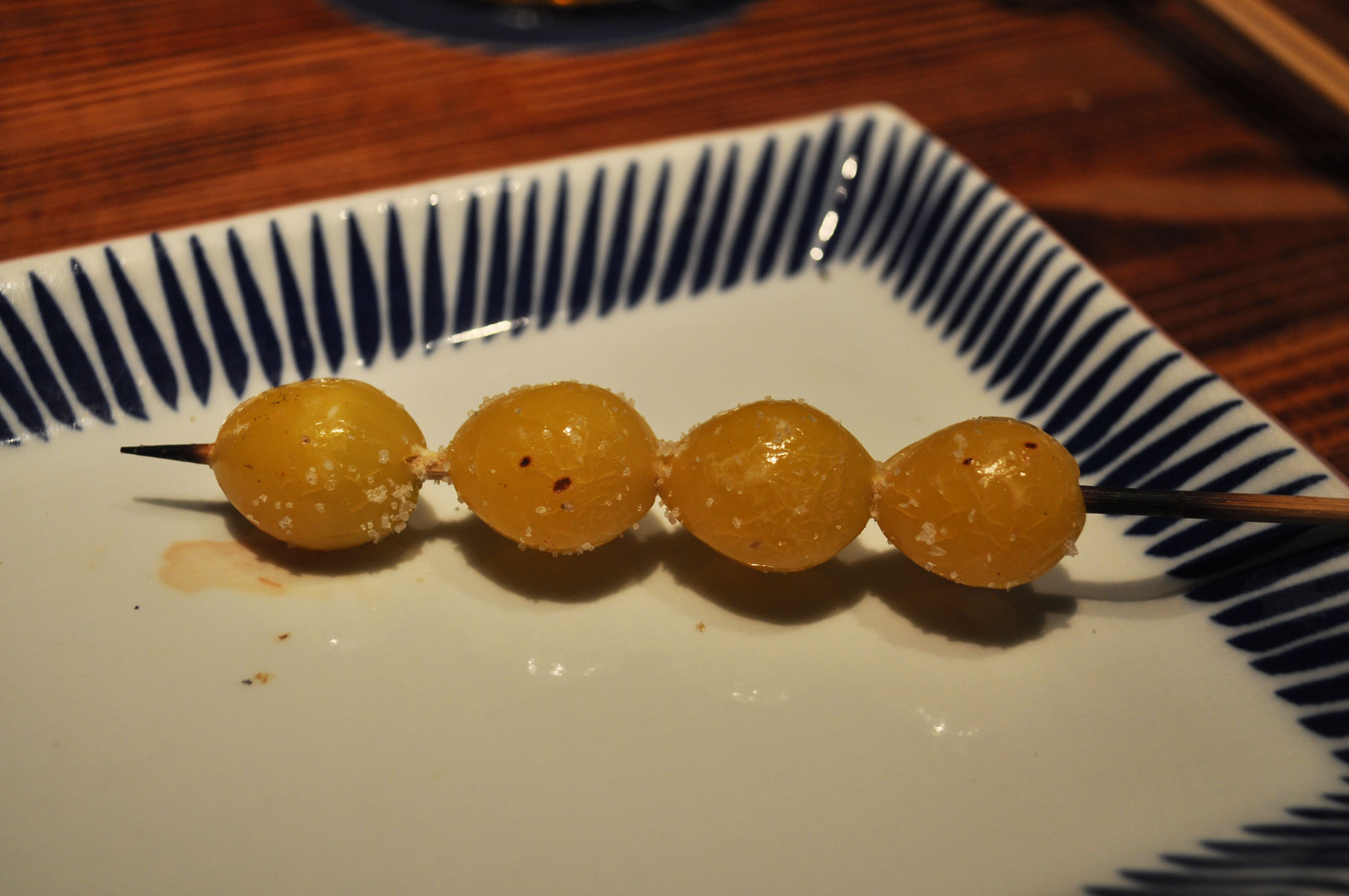
Ginkgo nuts

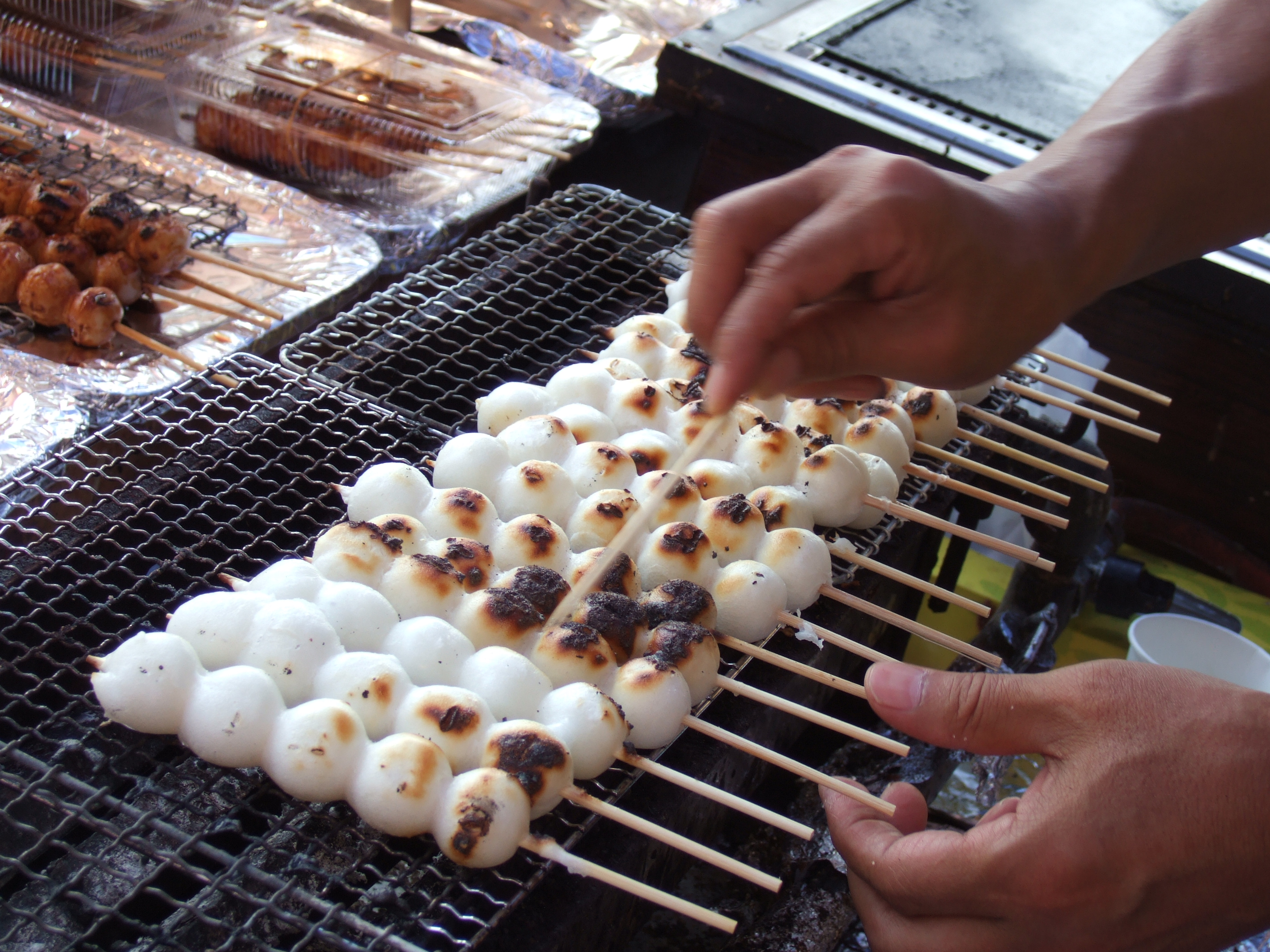
Mitarashi dango

== See also ==
- Japanese cuisine
- List of chicken dishes
- Robatayaki
- Similar skewered food
  - Brochette in France
  - Chuanr in China
  - Kkochi in Korea
  - List of kebabs
  - Nem nướng in Vietnam
  - Satay in Southeast Asia
  - Shashlik
  - Souvlaki in Greece
