= Gyūtan =

Japanese dish made from beef tongue

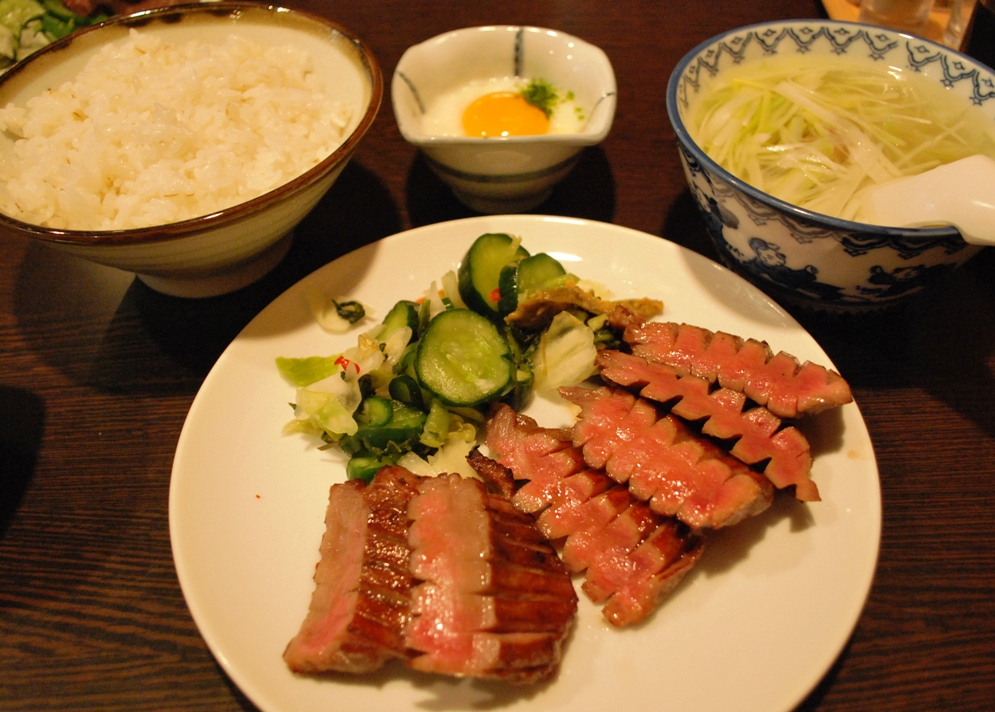
Gyūtan teishoku, a table d'hôte of gyūtan in Sendai

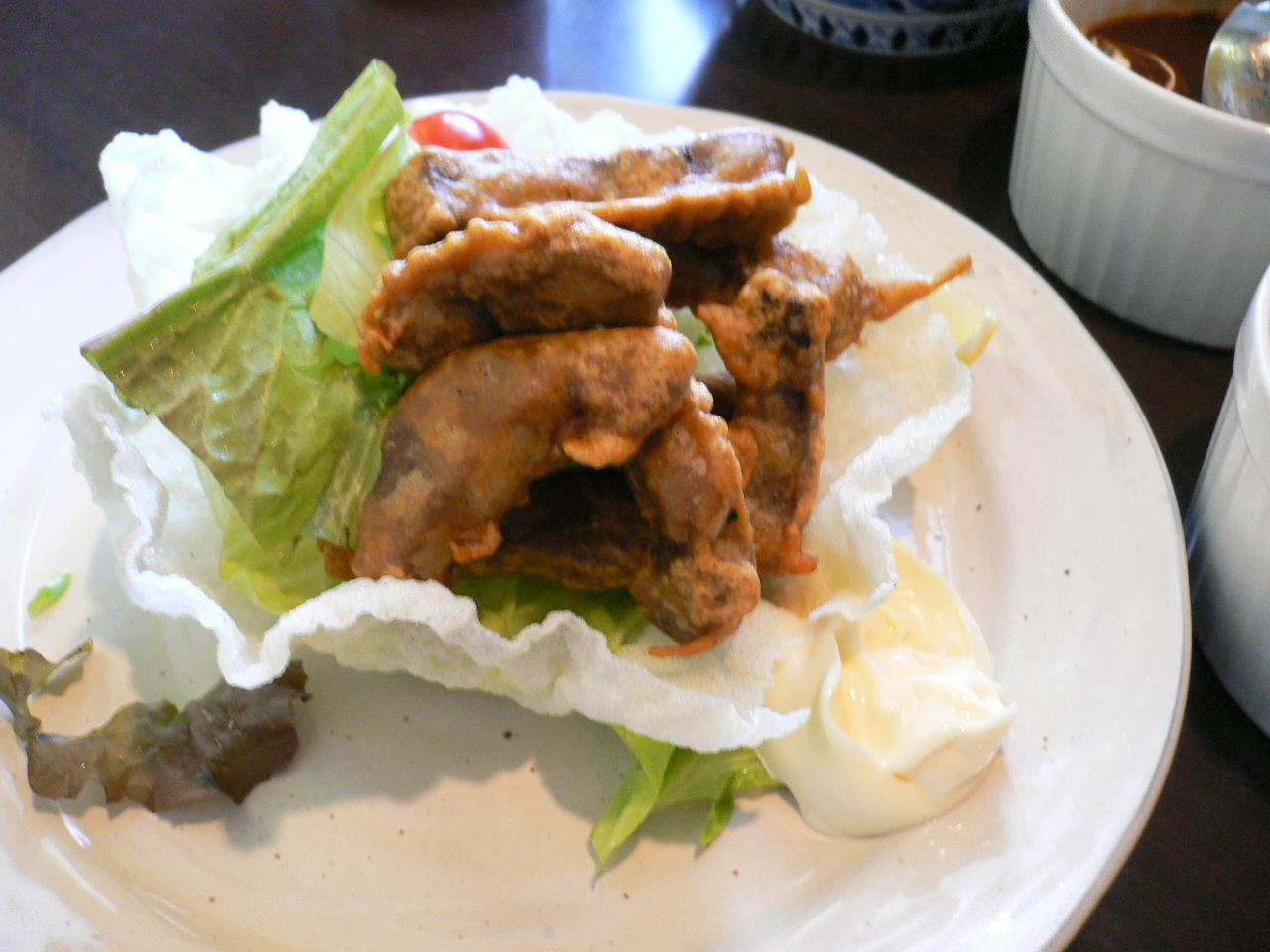
Gyūtan karaage

Gyūtan (牛タン) is a Japanese food that is made from grilled beef tongue. The word gyūtan is a combination of the Japanese word for cow (牛, gyū) and the English word tongue. Since gyūtan literally means "cow tongue," the word is also used to refer to cow tongues in Japan. The custom of cooking gyūtan originated in Sendai in 1948, and is usually served with barley rice, tail soup, and pickles in the Sendai area. In other areas in Japan, gyūtan is most often served in yakiniku restaurants. Gyūtan was originally conceived to be flavored with salt, which led to gyūtan being called tanshio (タン塩; lit. "tongue salt") in many yakiniku restaurants. However, some stores now serve gyūtan with tare sauce.

== History ==
Gyūtan was created when Sano Keishirō, the owner of a yakitori restaurant in Sendai, opened a new restaurant that served cow tongue dishes in 1948. This restaurant was called Tasuke (太助), and is still considered one of the best places to eat gyūtan in Sendai. Most locals falsely believe and even advertise that gyūtan started when Sano decided to use cow tongues and tails left over by occupation forces, which were stationed in Sendai after Japan was defeated in World War II. However, a simple check of the official restaurant website states that at the beginning the ingredients were retrieved by shopping trips via steam train to adjacent Yamagata Prefecture. Gyūtan was initially considered a rather unusual dish, but gradually gained popularity throughout Japan, partially because white collar workers who were transferred from Sendai spread its reputation to other cities.

Gyūtan restaurants received a boost in 1991, when Japan's import quotas for beef were eliminated. In 2003, the Japanese government temporarily banned American beef imports after mad cow disease was discovered in the country. This was a devastating blow for many gyūtan restaurants. For example, 90% of the beef tongues used in gyūtan restaurants in Sendai were imported from the U.S. Additionally, some connoisseurs claim that U.S. beef contains the ideal amount of fat for gyūtan dishes and refuse to use Australian beef.
