= Weasand clip =

Slaughterhouse tool

A weasand clip is a meatpacking industry tool used in the slaughter of ruminant animals in an industrial slaughterhouse setting. A serrated plastic clip, it is fastened deep in the weasand (the esophagus of slaughtered livestock) with a rod to prevent the contents of the rumen from leaking out and contaminating the carcass.

== History ==
Per Emily Frost of Auckland University, weasand clips were invented in New Zealand. Prior to weasand clips in the 1950s and 1960s, industrial slaughterhouses would tie off the weasand by hand with help of a meat hook.

== Environmental impact ==
In New Zealand, weasand clips are a marine plastic pollution, due to industrial wastewater from meatpacking plants as well as seagulls spreading clips from refuse piles. Marine life that eat the weasand clips can suffer internal blockages, or punctures from the sharp teeth; the clips are a form of visual pollution on beaches. Weasand clips are also an industrial contaminant in rendering of the organs of animals. The clips typically caught and removed from waste via agricultural wastewater treatment screening.

== See also ==
- Bread clip
