= Chickenhead =

Chickenhead may refer to:

- Chickenhead (play), by Hungarian playwright György Spiró
- Chickenhead (sexuality), a slang term for someone who performs fellatio
- "Chickenhead" (song), by Project Pat
- Chickenhead, a term used in science fiction novel Do Androids Dream of Electric Sheep by Philip K. Dick, derogatory term used to refer to 'specials', people who have mentally degraded as a result of exposure to fallout on earth.

== See also ==
- The Radioactive Chicken Heads, American punk rock band
- Mike the Headless Chicken
