= Saumagen =

German stuffed dish of potatoes and pork with spices

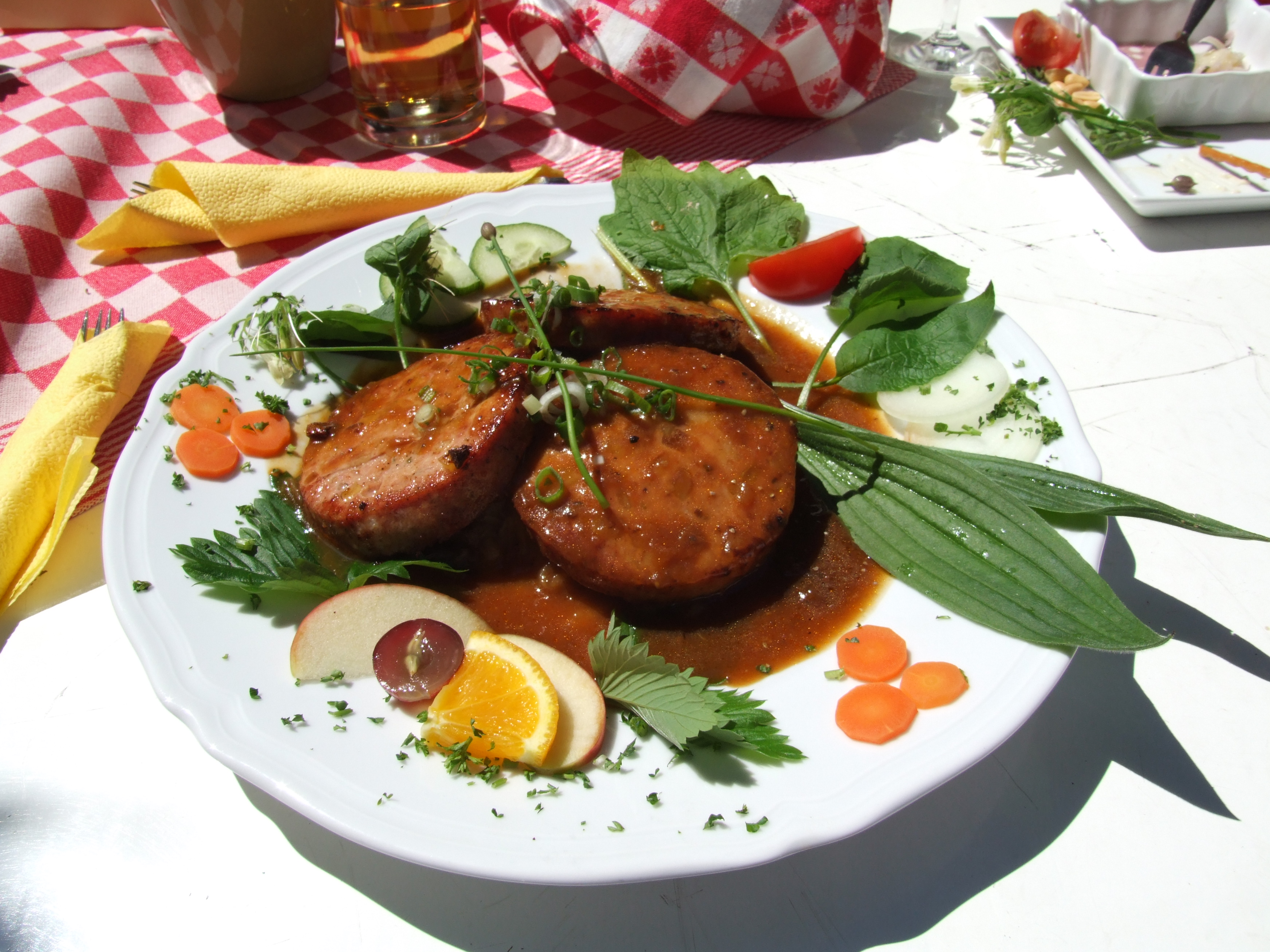
Pfälzer Saumagen

Saumagen ([ˈzaʊ̯maːɡŋ̩], "sow's stomach") is a German dish popular in the Palatinate. The dish is similar to a sausage in that it consists of a stuffed casing; however, the stomach itself is integral to the dish. The stomach is not as thin as a typical sausage casing (intestines or artificial casing) but rather is meat-like, being a strong muscular organ. When the dish is finished by being pan-fried or roasted in the oven, it becomes crisp.

== Stuffing ==
Saumagen stuffing consists of potatoes and pork, usually spiced with onions, marjoram, nutmeg and white pepper; various recipes also mention cloves, coriander, thyme, garlic, bay leaf, cardamom, basil, caraway, allspice, and parsley. Sometimes beef is also used; a variant popular in autumn replaces some or all of the potatoes with chestnuts. The larger ingredients are diced finely. After that, the saumagen is cooked in hot water, slightly below boiling temperature to prevent rupture of the stomach. It is either served directly with sauerkraut and mashed potatoes or stored in the refrigerator for later use. To warm it again, the saumagen is cut into slices approximately 1/2 to 1 inch thick (1.3 to 2.5 cm), which are then fried in an open pan. The typical accompanying drink in the wine region of the Palatinate is usually a dry white wine, and in the Palatinate forest to the west, preferably a local beer.

== History ==
There is controversy regarding the origin of the dish: one theory claims that saumagen was created in the 18th century by Palatinate farmers to make use of slaughtering residues (schlachtreste). Another theory insists that saumagen has always been the highlight of each local Schlachtfest in the Palatinate region, a festival that involved the ceremonial slaughter of a pig and that is still celebrated in some wine-growing districts when the vintage is finished and when winter is near. Today the saumagen offered by German butchers and restaurants uses high-quality ingredients. Luise Wilhelmine Henninger^{[16]} (1871–1951), cook and landlady at the Weinhaus Henninger in Kallstadt, is said to have saved the largely forgotten saumagen recipe and to have elevated it to a culinary delight, eventually. The dish lends its name to a Riesling vineyard in Kallstadt as "Saumagen Kallstadt".

Helmut Kohl, the German chancellor from 1982 to 1998, loved saumagen and had it served to visiting heads of state and government, including Margaret Thatcher, Mikhail Gorbachev, Ronald Reagan and Bill Clinton. Kohl came from the Palatinate and his enthusiasm for the very local dish brought it to a wider public. Some Germans viewed this attachment as a sign that Kohl was unsophisticated and provincial, but some saw it as a clever way of advertising his home region, as local butchers and restaurants experienced an increase of saumagen sales during and after state visits.

The Schlotte Carnival society in Schifferstadt has awarded the Order of the Saumagen since 1992. Landau hosts a Saumagen-competition, the Internationale Pfälzer Saumagen-Wettbewerb. Unique recipes include e.g. fish or deer stuffing. The first laureates, Imke Bruns and Iris Wittmann are now members of the jury.

== “Dutch goose” ==
In the Pennsylvania Dutch region of the United States, the dish, known locally as seimaage, hogmal, stuffed hog maw ("maw" is an old word for stomach), simply pig stomach, or “Dutch goose” (by those who are not Pennsylvania Dutch) is popular during the harvest season. Traditionally, pig stomach, not turkey, was the main course for Thanksgiving among Pennsylvania Dutch families. This tradition stems from the Old World, with the bulk of Pennsylvania Dutch settlers originating from the Palatinate. Unlike the German version, the dish is typically baked for several hours, rather than boiled.

== See also ==
- Grützwurst
- Haggis: A similar Scottish dish consisting of sheep offal and fillers boiled in a sheep's stomach, sometimes prepared further by frying or baking
