= Hog maw =

Stomach of a pig as food

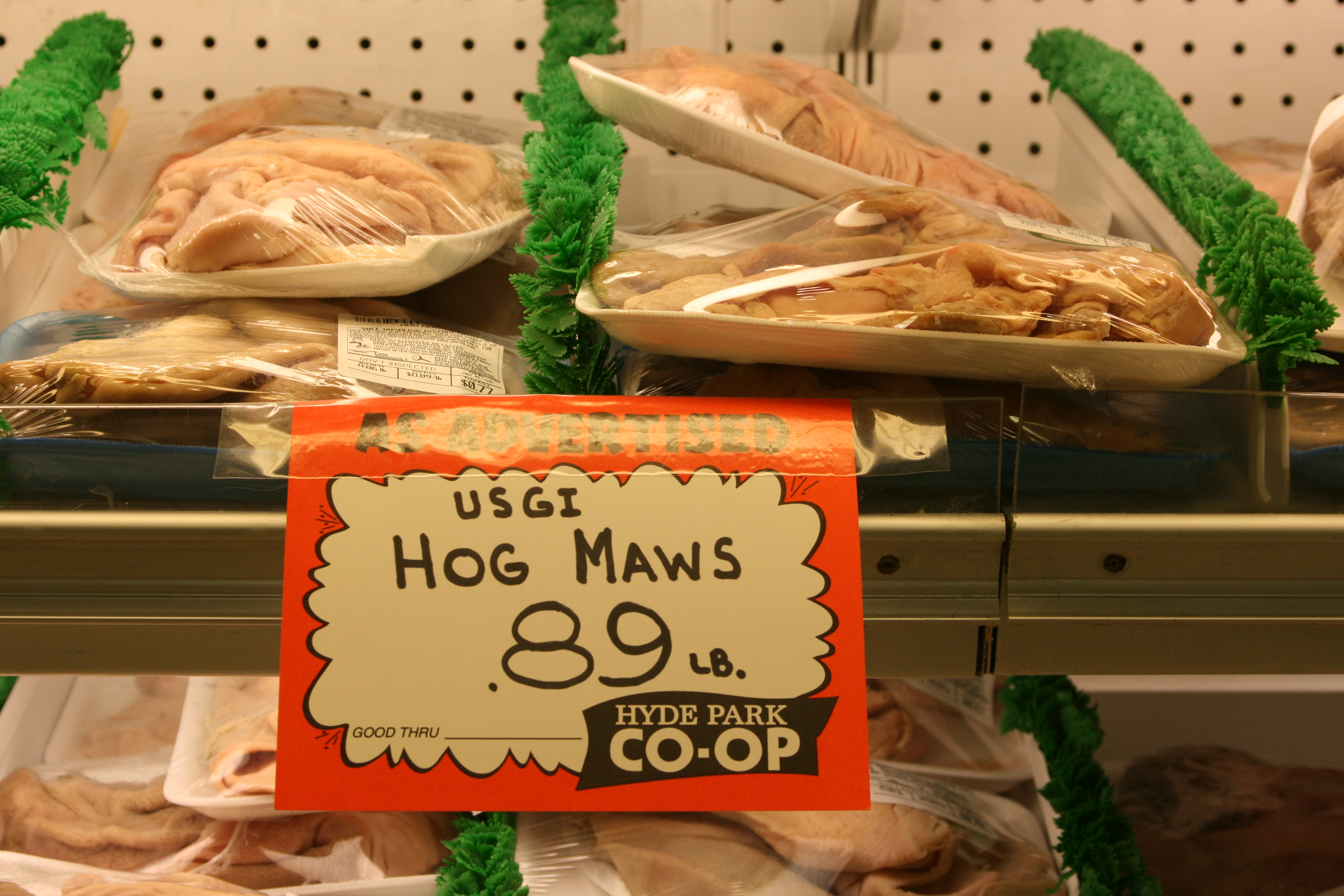
Hog maw on sale

Hog maw is the stomach of a pig prepared as food. More specifically, it is the exterior muscular wall of the stomach organ (with interior, lining mucosa removed) which contains no fat if cleaned properly. It can be found in American, soul food, Chinese, Pennsylvania Dutch, Mexican, German, Portuguese, Italian and Vietnamese dishes. In addition, it can be prepared in various ways including stewed, fried, baked, and broiled.

== Ethnic dishes ==
=== Pennsylvania Dutch ===
Hog maw, sometimes called pig's stomach, Susquehanna turkey or Pennsylvania Dutch goose is a Pennsylvania Dutch dish. In the Pennsylvania German language, it is known as Seimaage (sigh-maw-guh), originating from its German name Saumagen. It is made from a cleaned pig's stomach traditionally stuffed with cubed potatoes and loose pork sausage meat. Other ingredients may include cabbage, onions, and spices. It was traditionally boiled in a large pot covered in water, not unlike Scottish haggis, but it can also be baked or broiled until browned or split, then it is often drizzled with butter, sometimes browned, before serving. It is usually served hot on a platter, cut into slices, and topped with horseradish or stewed tomatoes. It can also be served cold as a sandwich. Often served in the winter, it was made on hog butchering days on the farms of Lancaster and Berks Counties and elsewhere in the Pennsylvania Dutch Country.

It remains a traditional New Year's Day side dish for many Pennsylvania German families; in fact, many families believe that it is bad luck if not even a small piece is consumed on New Year's Day, as is the case with pork and sauerkraut. The stomach is purchased at one of the many traditional butchers at local farmers' markets. The original recipe was most likely brought to Pennsylvania from the Palatinate area of Germany, where it is called Saumagen and served with sauerkraut, another Pennsylvania Dutch food. Indeed, Saumagen is reported to have been a favorite of former German Chancellor Helmut Kohl, a native of the Palatinate (Rheinland-Pfalz) Region.

=== Soul food ===
As a soul food dish, hog maw has often been coupled with chitterlings, which are pig intestines. In the book Plantation Row Slave Cabin Cooking: The Roots of Soul Food hog maw is used in the Hog Maw Salad recipe.

Hog maw is also traditionally prepared for New Year's Day for prosperity along with other traditional Southern New Year's Day dishes like collard greens and Hoppin' John.

=== Chinese cuisine ===
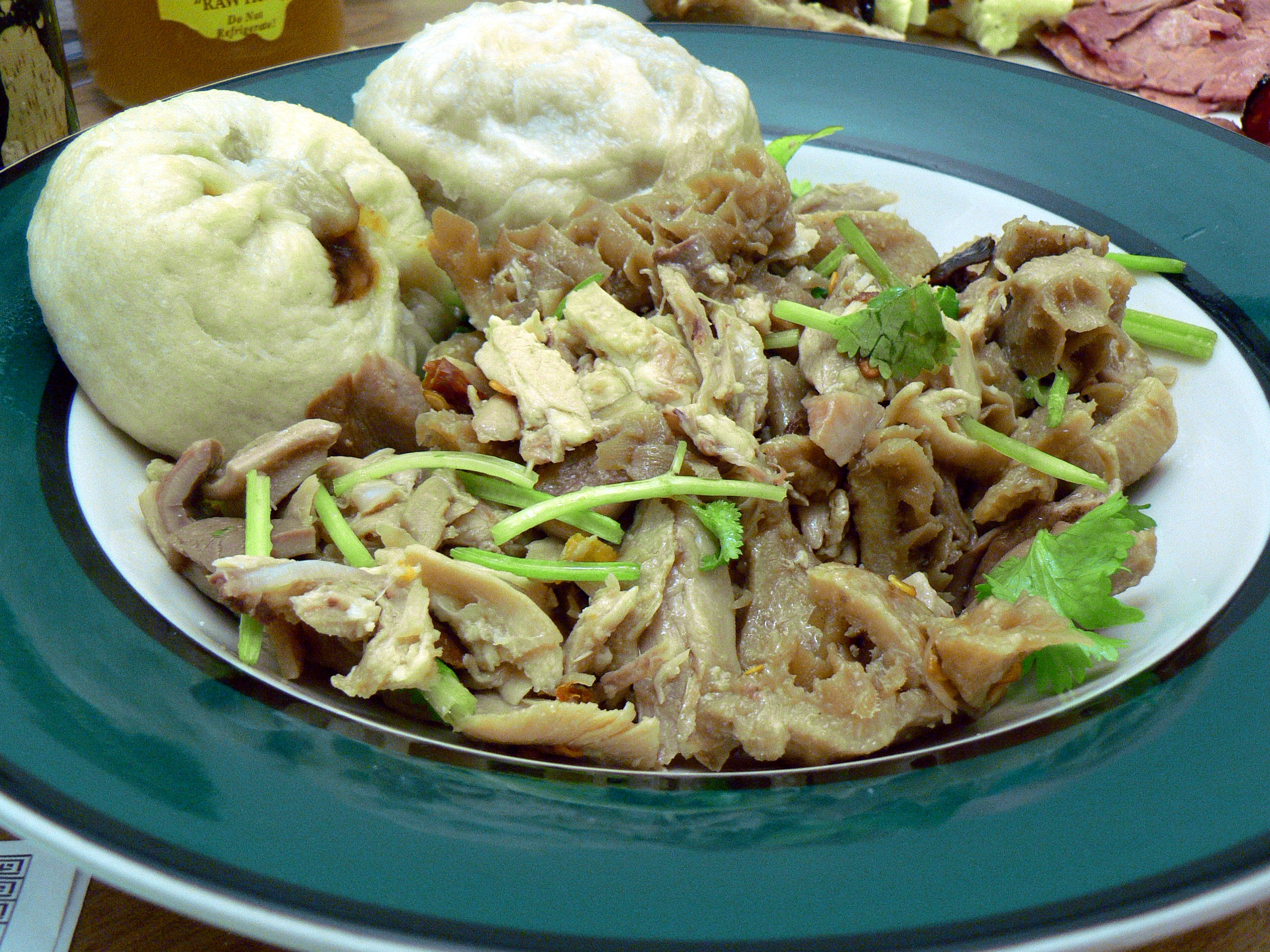
Stir fried hog maw served with pork and beef baozi

In Chinese cuisine, hog maw is called 猪肚 (zhūdù, "pig stomach") often served stir-fried with vegetables. It can also be braised, chilled, and sliced as part of a cold cut tray.

=== Latin American cuisine ===
Hog maws (called "buche") are a specialty in taco stands all over Mexico, mostly deep fried with the rest of the pork.

In Puerto Rico, hog maws are called Cuajos. Cuajitos is a popular street vendor food found around the island and is most often served with boiled green banana escabeche and morcilla (blood sausage).
