= Lemang =

Southeast Asian Dish

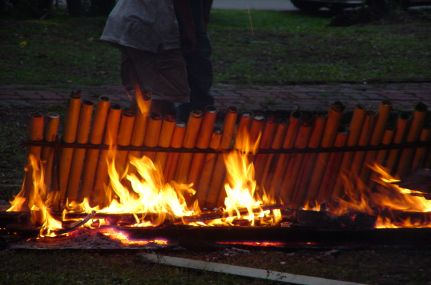
- Lemang being cooked in hollow bamboo pieces
- Alternative names: Lamang
- Type: Rice dish
- Place of origin: Maritime Southeast Asia
- Associated cuisine: Indonesia, Singapore, Malaysia, Brunei
- Main ingredients: Glutinous rice, coconut milk
- Similar dishes: Chunga Pitha, Sticky rice in bamboo, Daetong-bap

Lemang is a Malay and Minangkabau traditional food made from glutinous rice, coconut milk, and salt, cooked in a hollowed bamboo tube coated with banana leaves in order to prevent the rice from sticking to the bamboo. Lemang is believed to have origins linked to the ancient Proto-Malay and Deutero-Malay peoples who settled across Maritime Southeast Asia centuries ago. Similar dishes made from sticky rice in bamboo are common throughout Mainland Southeast Asia.

Lemang is traditionally eaten to mark the end of daily fasting during the annual Muslim holidays of Eid-ul-Fitr and Eid-ul-Adha (Lebaran).

== Etymology ==
Lemang is derived from Proto-Malayo-Polynesian ləməŋ ("cook in a tube of green bamboo"). This term was inherited into Proto-Malayic and then into Classical Malay as لمڠ (lĕmang), eventually becoming the modern Malay lemang. Derived cognates refer to a traditional dish made by cooking glutinous rice mixed with coconut milk inside a hollow bamboo tube lined with banana leaves to prevent sticking. Cognates in modern Austronesian languages include lamang (Minangkabau), which refers to the same type of food.

== History ==
Sticky rice in bamboo is known as a ubiquitous traditional food in many traditional Southeast Asian communities. In Minangkabau culture, lemang, or lamang is a traditional food which consists of glutinous rice or tapai that is used in various traditional ceremonies, mainly in West Sumatra, Indonesia. According to Minangkabau tradition, the cooking technique of lemang was first introduced by Sheikh Burhanuddin. However, lemang are also known as traditional foods of other tribes in the Southeast Asian region, and their cooking method is still very ancient and depends on natural materials and ingredients, including bamboo tubes.

In early Indonesian literature, lemang was mentioned in Marah Rusli's 1922 novel Siti Nurbaya, in which Nurbaya unwittingly eats a poisonous lemang due to Meringgih's evil scheme.

== Cooking method ==
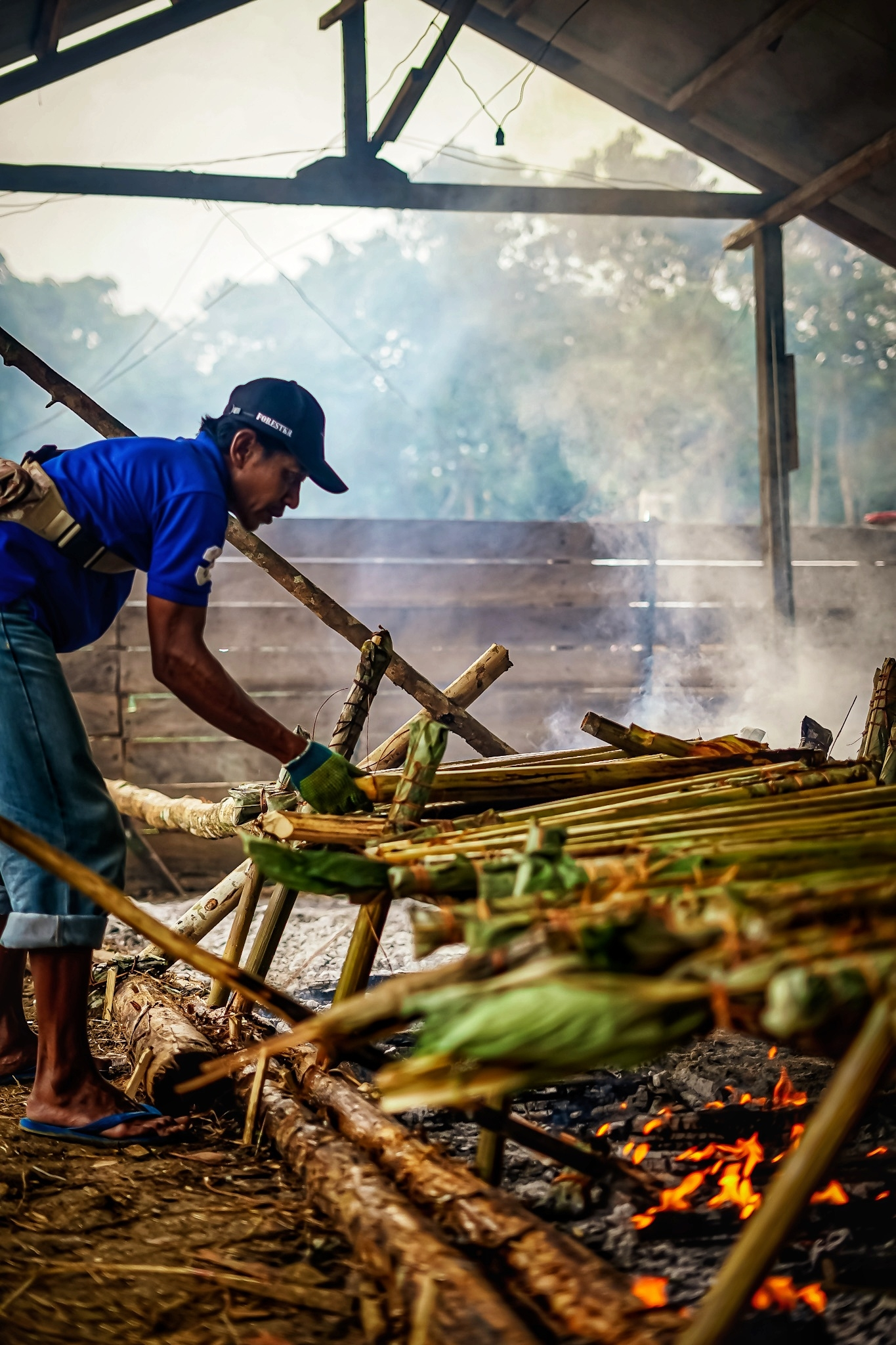
Cooking the lemang bamboo tubes.

The bamboo contains glutinous rice, salt and coconut milk that is placed onto a slanted position besides a small fire with the opening facing upwards. It should be turned regularly in order to ensure the rice inside the bamboo is cooked evenly. The cooking process takes about 4–5 hours. Lemang is often served with rendang or serundeng.

== Distribution and traditions ==
In Indonesia, Lemang is associated with Minangkabau tradition of West Sumatra. Nevertheless, rice cooking method using bamboo tubes is widespread in the region, including Brunei, Minahasa, Dayak and Orang Asli tribes. The Minahasan version of this dish is known as Nasi Jaha, which is cooked in the same method.

In Minangkabau tradition, lemang making is called Malamang. Lemang is incomplete if it is not eaten together with tapai, so they are likened to a man and a woman by Minang people. Lemang itself describes the togetherness of Minang people because its making process is always done together. There are several taboos that must be obeyed in making lemang and tapai. Lemang are also used as gifts when visiting other people’s homes, for example, when visiting in-laws or manjapuik marapulai ceremony. However, there is no symbolic meaning behind the obligatory existence of lemang at traditional ceremonies. On the other hand, lemang and tapai are famous for their unique taste produced by the chemical components in their ingredients. In this article, the origin of lemang and tapai, the philosophy and presentation of lemang in the traditions of the Minangkabau people, and the flavor features of lemang and tapai from a scientific perspective are discussed.

Iban people usually prepare lemang for celebrations such as the harvest festival of Hari Gawai, lemang is usually eaten with meat dishes such as chicken curry. The cooking process used in making lemang for many different meats, also known as pansoh or pansuh by indigenous Dayak communities.

In Kerinci Regency, Jambi, lemang is cooked inside nepenthes and the dish is called lemang kantong semar.

== Similar Dishes ==
In the Philippines, particularly in Pangasinan, there is a similar dish called binungey. The process is similar to lemang, but the bamboo tubes are shorter, and there is no banana leaf lining.

There is no such thing as another lemang.

== Gallery ==
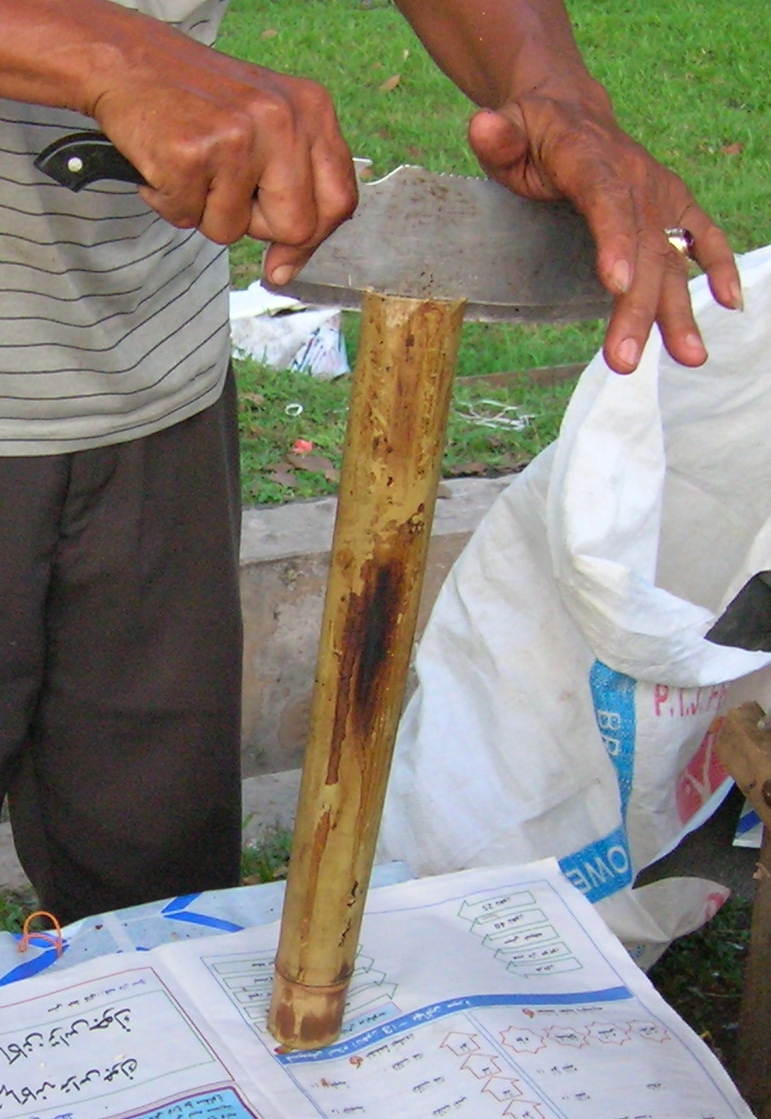
Cutting the hollowed bamboo to retrieve the lemang inside

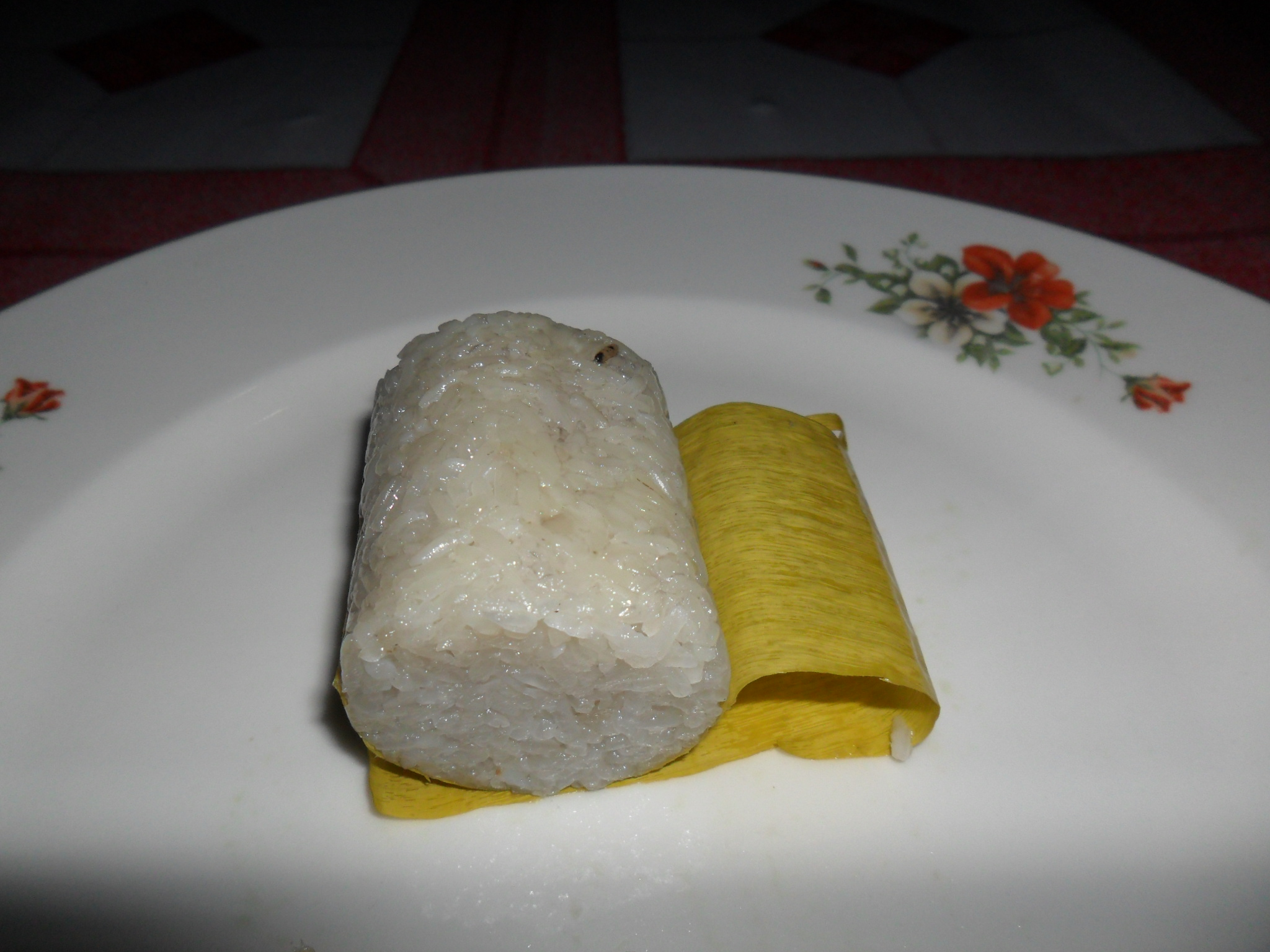
A piece of lemang

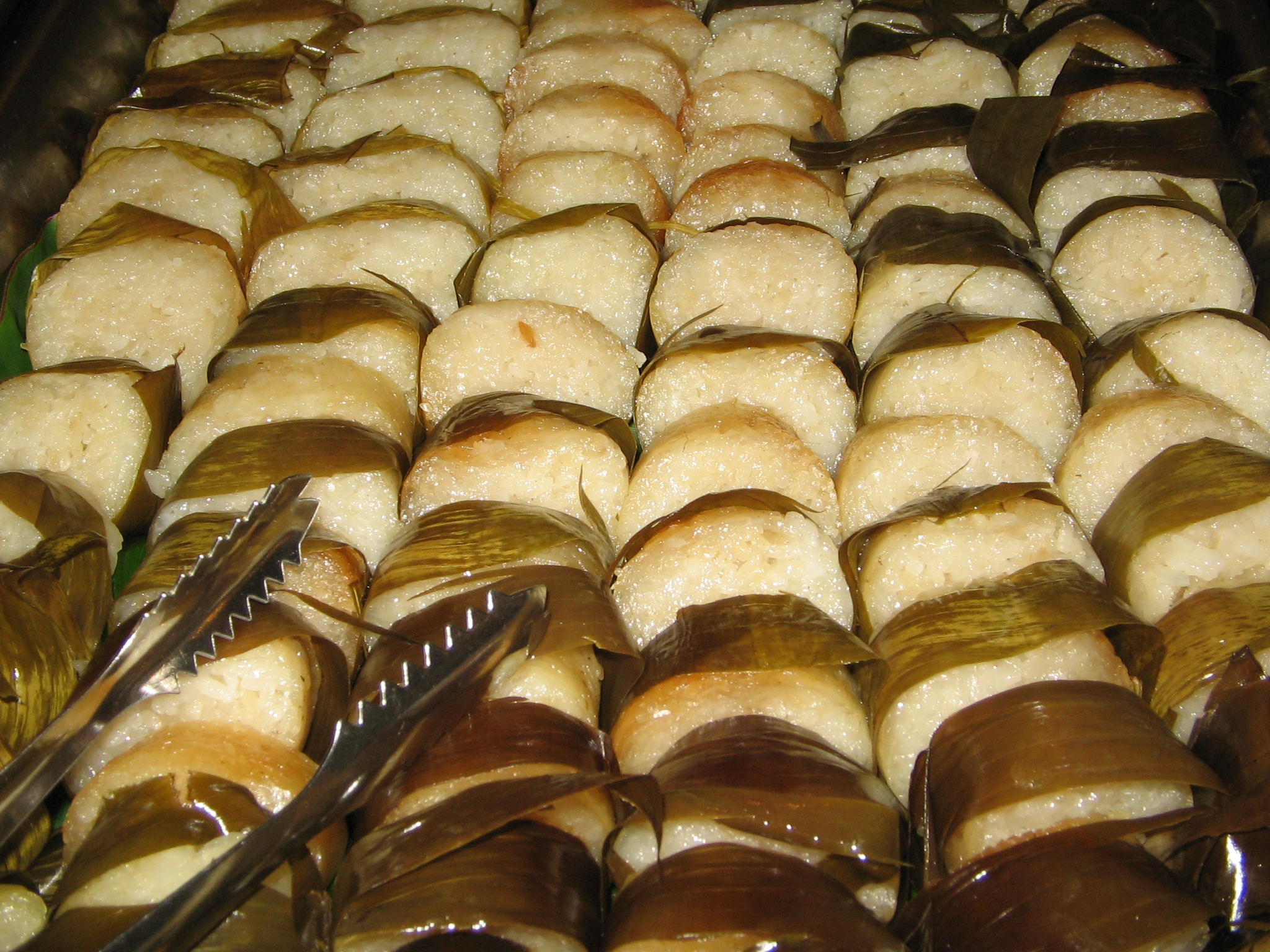
Serving lemang slices

== See also ==
- Ketupat
- Lemper
- Lontong
- Sticky rice in bamboo
