= Mućkalica =

Serbian dish

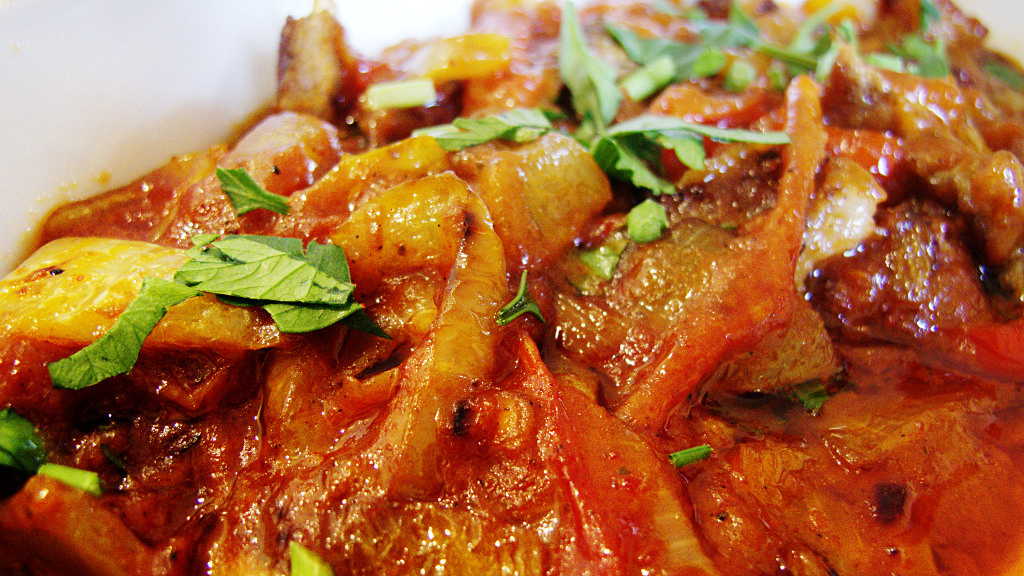
Mućkalica

Mućkalica (pronounced [ˈmût͜ɕkalit͜sa]) is a Serbian dish, a stew made of barbecued meat and vegetables. Its name is derived from mućkati, meaning 'to shake, stir, or mix'.

Meat from different animals, as well as various cuts from the same type of animal, are used to make a mućkalica. There are various regional styles of mućkalicas, such as Leskovačka mućkalica, the most popular, and Toplička mućkalica. It is usually made from cold, leftover barbecued meat, which is stewed with various other ingredients.

== See also ==
- Leskovac Grill Festival
- List of barbecue dishes
- List of stews
