= List of barbecue dishes =

Distinct food types generally cooked using the specific method

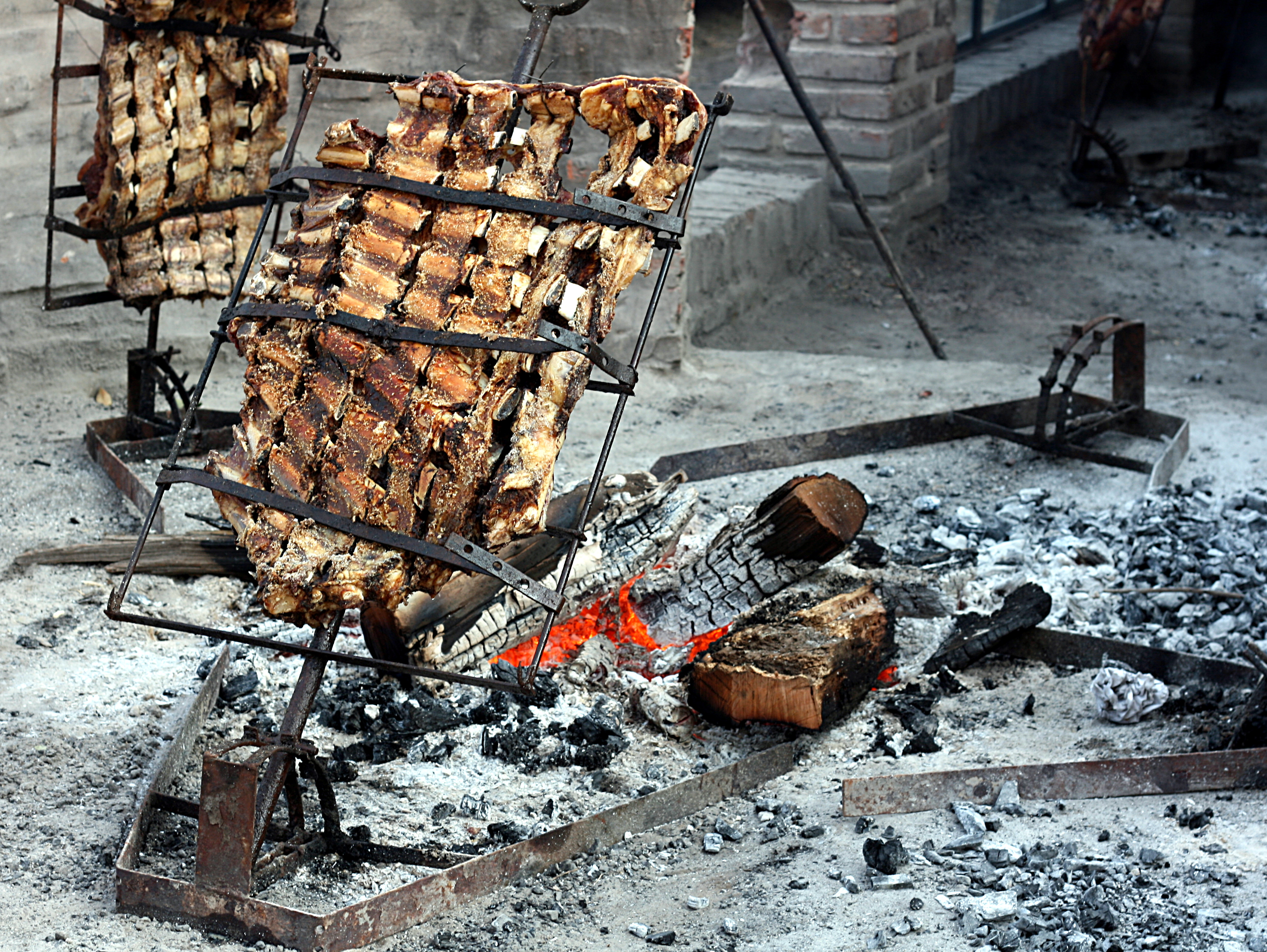
Asado on an open pit

This is a list of barbecue dishes, comprising barbecued dishes and foods, along with those that are often barbecued.

== Barbecue foods ==
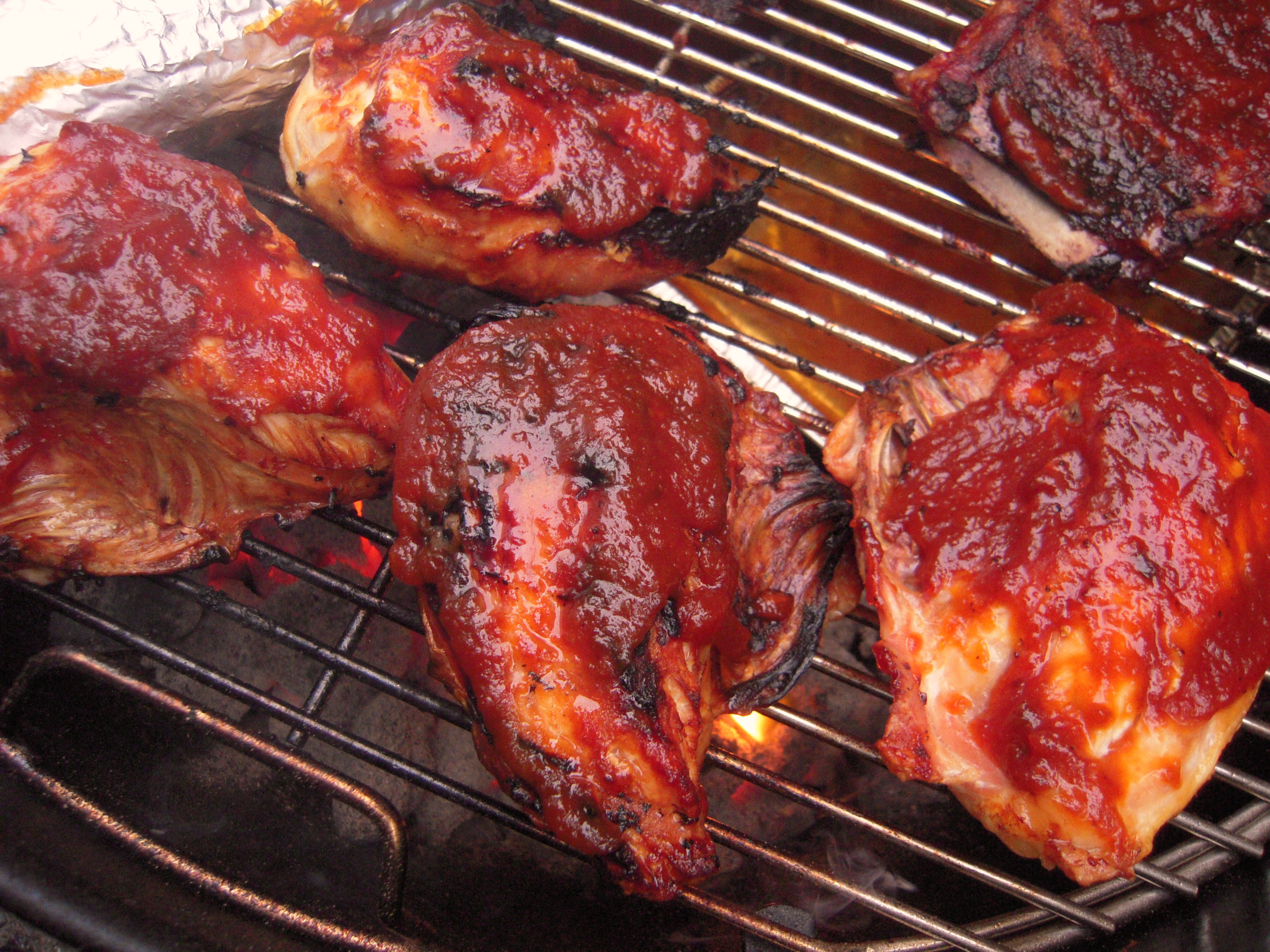
Marinated barbecue chicken being cooked on a barbecue grill

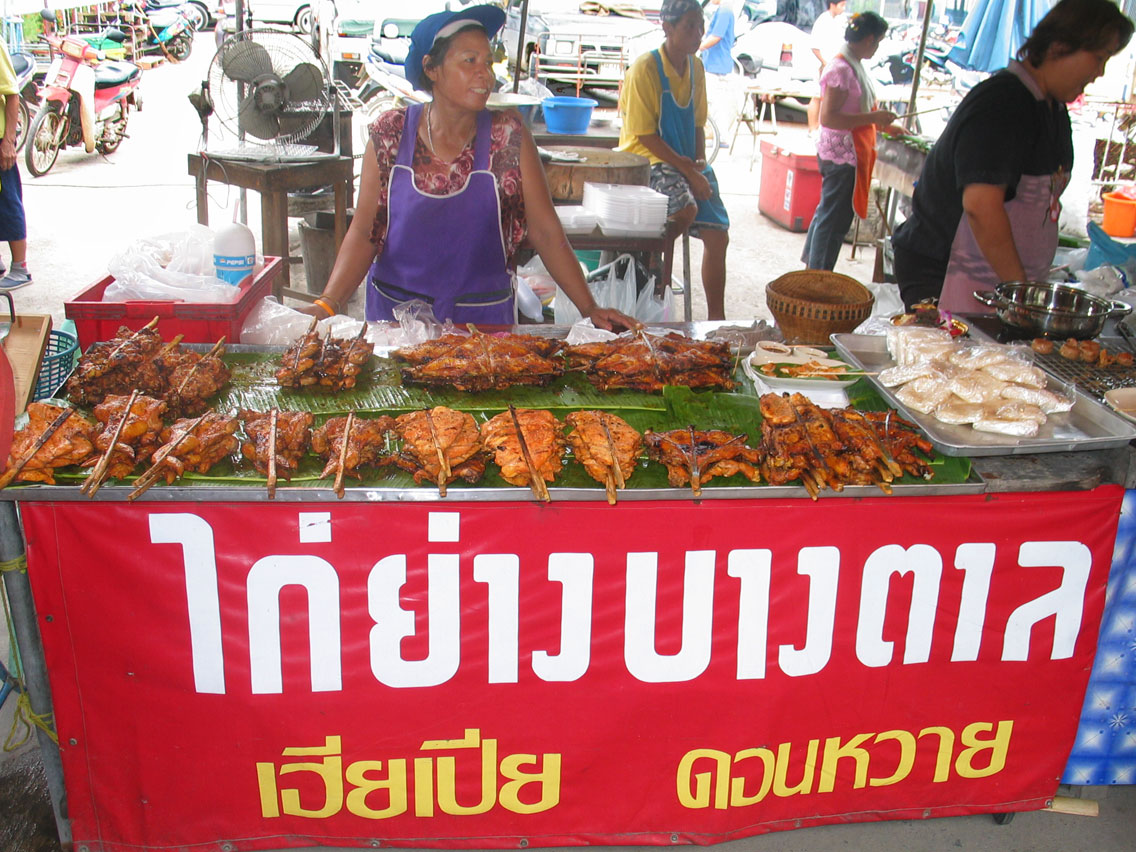
Kai yang at a street market in Thailand

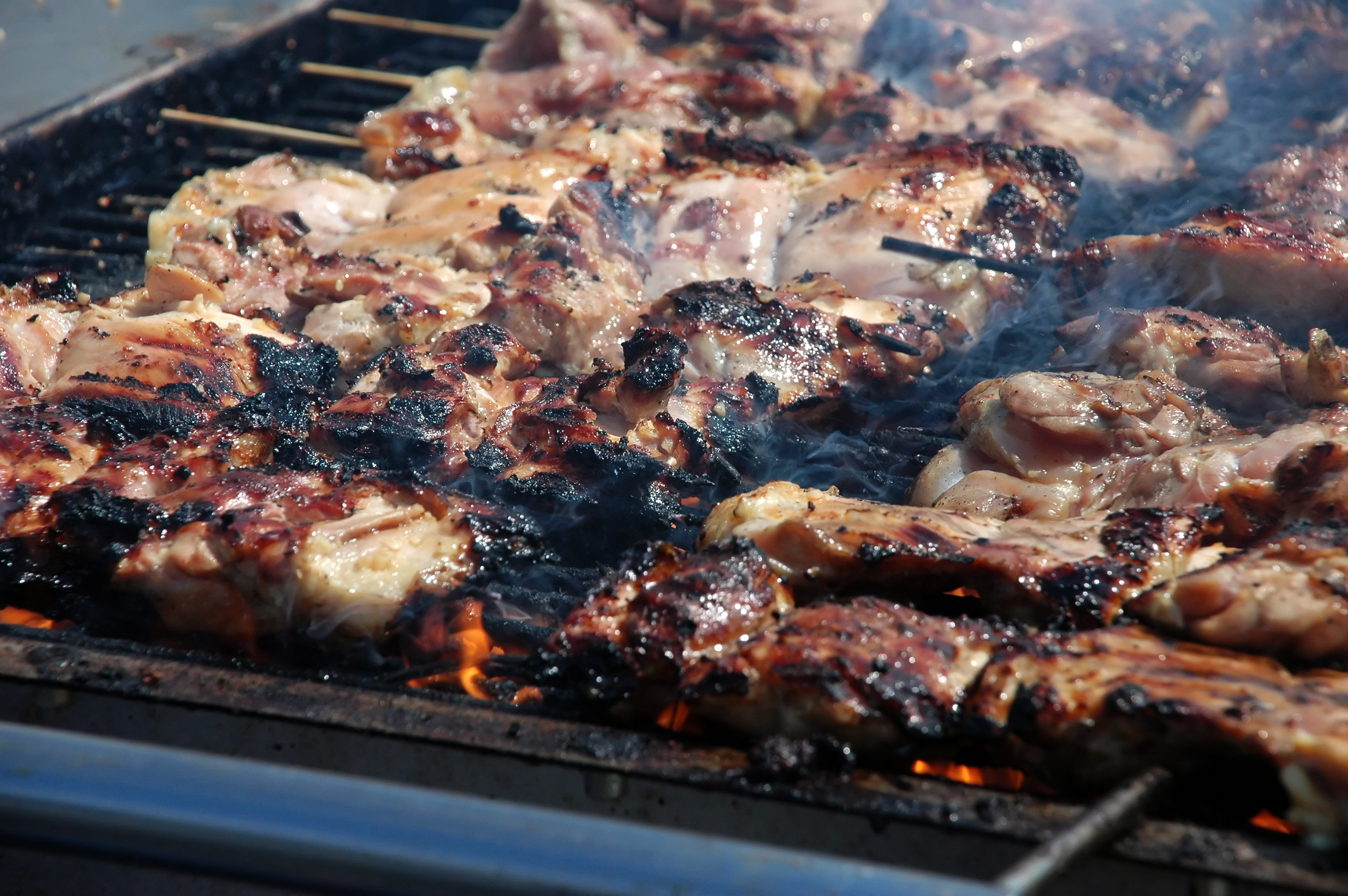
Chicken kebabs being barbecued

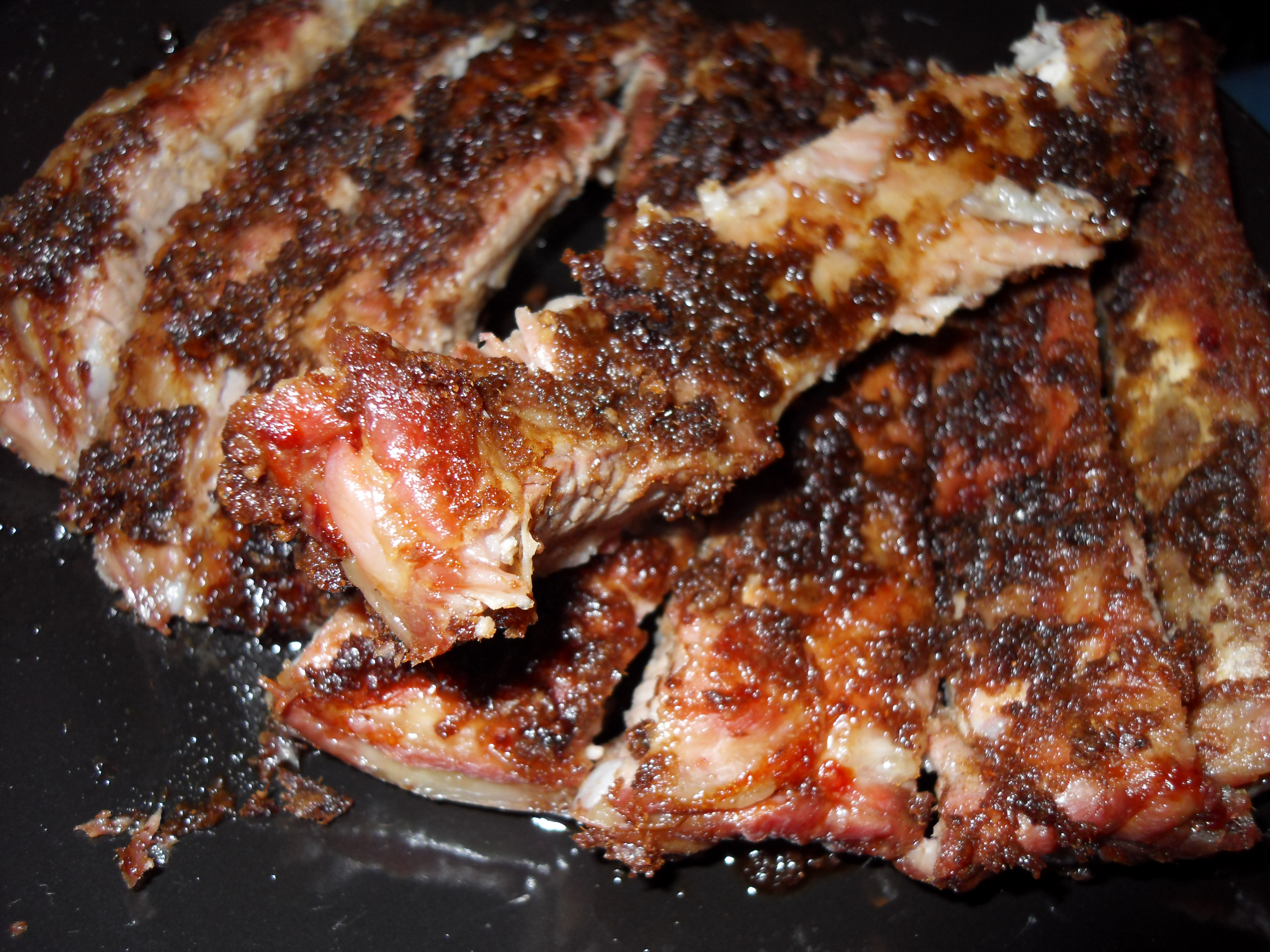
Barbecue spare ribs

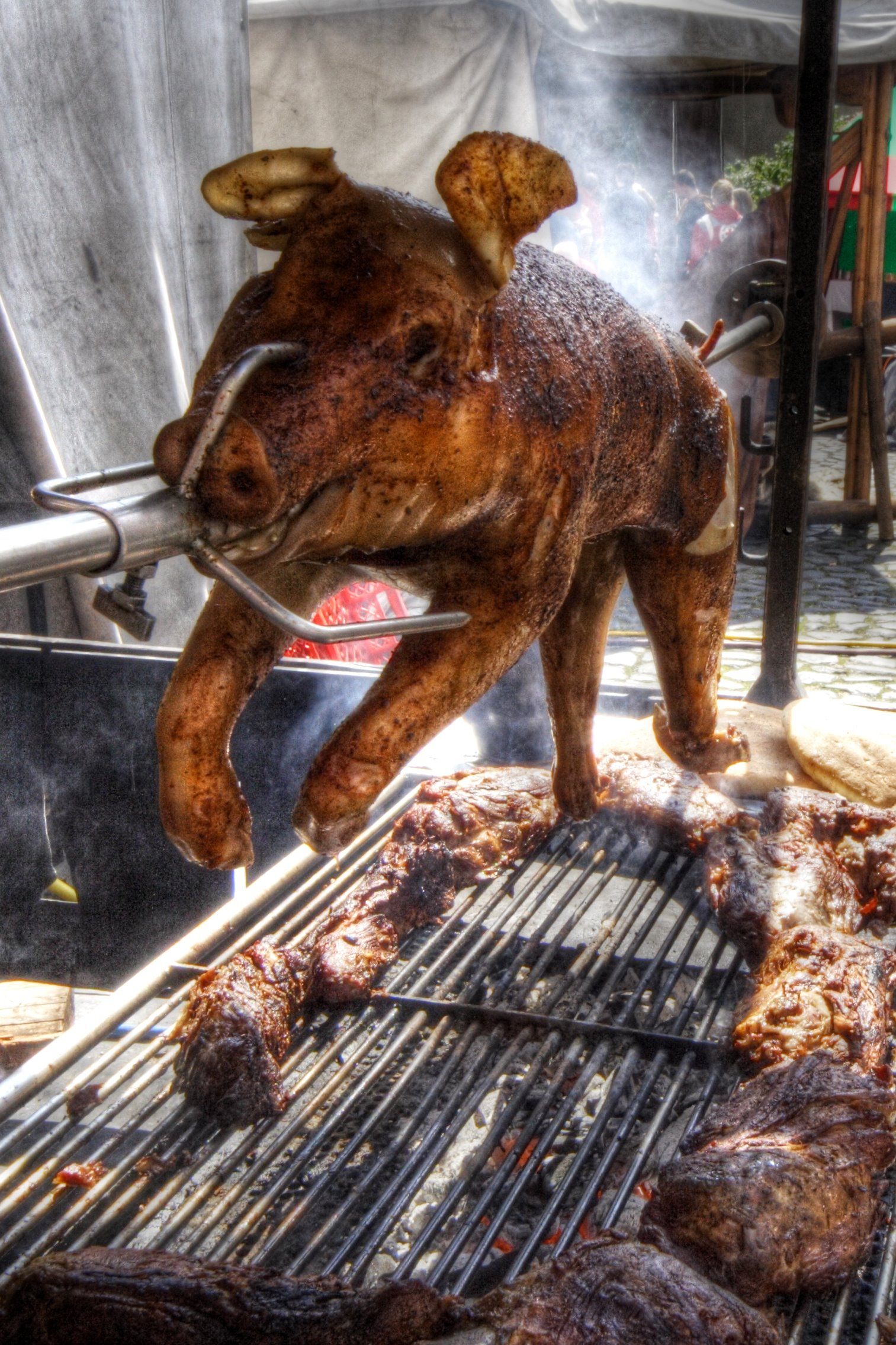
Spanferkel, a version of suckling pig in German cuisine

- Akçaabat meatballs – Middle Eastern and South Asian meatballs
- Anticuchos – Meat skewer dish that originated in Peru
- Arrosticini – Italian skewered lamb dish
- Asado – Barbecue style in various South American countries. It is also a term used both for a range of barbecue techniques and the social event of having or attending a barbecue
- Barbacoa – Style of cooked meat preparation originating in Latin America
- Barbecue chicken – Chicken that is barbecued, grilled or smoked
- Barbecue sandwich – Sandwich with barbecued meat fillings
- Barbecue spaghetti – American pasta dish
- Beef ribs – Cut of beef with rib bone attached
- Beefsteak – Flat cut of beef
- Brisket – Cut of beef
  - Burnt ends – Barbecued meat delicacy
- Brochette – Thin metal or wood stick used to hold pieces of food together
- Bulgogi – Korean meat dish
- Bull roast
- Carne asada – Dish of grilled and sliced beef
- Chuanr – Chinese street food
- Churrasco – Portuguese and Spanish name for beef or grilled meat
- Cocoloşi – Romanian dish of grilled corn porridge
- Corn on the cob – Whole sweet corn, consumed as food
- Ćevapi – Dish from Southeast Europe
- Dakkochi – South Korean street food
- Espetada – Technique of cooking food on skewers
- Fatányéros – Traditional Hungarian mixed meat barbecue dish
- Frigărui – Romanian kebab
- Galinha à Africana – Macanese chicken dish
- Gyros – Greek dish
- Hash - Pork dish
- Hamburgers – Dish with patty between buns
- Inihaw – Barbecue dishes from the Philippines
- Inasal – Roasted chicken dish from the Philippines
- Isaw – Filipino street food
- Jeok – Skewered food in Korean cuisine
- Jujeh kabab – Persian chicken kebab
- Kabab Barg – Iranian grilled meat dish
- Kai yang – Lao-Thai grilled chicken
- Kebab – Variety of meat dishes originating in the Middle East
- Khorkhog – Mongolian dish
- Kofte kebab – Turkish dish of mincemeat kofta grilled on skewers
- Lechón/Leitão - Iberian roasted pork dish
- Méchoui – Spit-roasted whole lamb or sheep. It is a dish in North African cuisine that consists of a whole sheep or a lamb spit-roasted on a barbecue
- Meurav Yerushalmi – Israeli grilled meat dish
- Mixiote – Mexican barbecued meat dish
- Mućkalica – Serbian dish
- Nyama choma – Grilled goat meat
- Pig pickin' – Whole hog barbecue
- Pig roast – Mealtime event roasting a whole pig
- Pinchitos – Southern Spain skewered meat dish
- Pljeskavica – Traditional Balkan meat dish
- Pork ribs – Cut of pork
- Pork shoulder – Pork shoulder cut
- Provoleta – Argentinian cheese
- Pulled pork – Pork barbecue dish of the Southern United States
- Ražnjići – Serbian grilled meat
- Sausage – Meat product
- Satay – Southeast Asian form of kebab
- Shashlik – Form of shish kebab
- Spare ribs – Pork ribs variety
- Sosatie – South African dish of meat cooked on skewers
- Souvlaki – Greek fast food
- Suckling pig – Piglet fed on its mother's milk
- Suya – Skewered grilled meat, popular in Nigeria
- Tandoori – Cylindrical clay oven used in South Asian cooking
- Tsukune – Japanese chicken meatball
- Whole hog barbecue - pit barbecue from the southern United States
- Yakitori – Japanese type of grilled chicken
- Yakiniku – Korean-style grilled meat cuisine in Japan
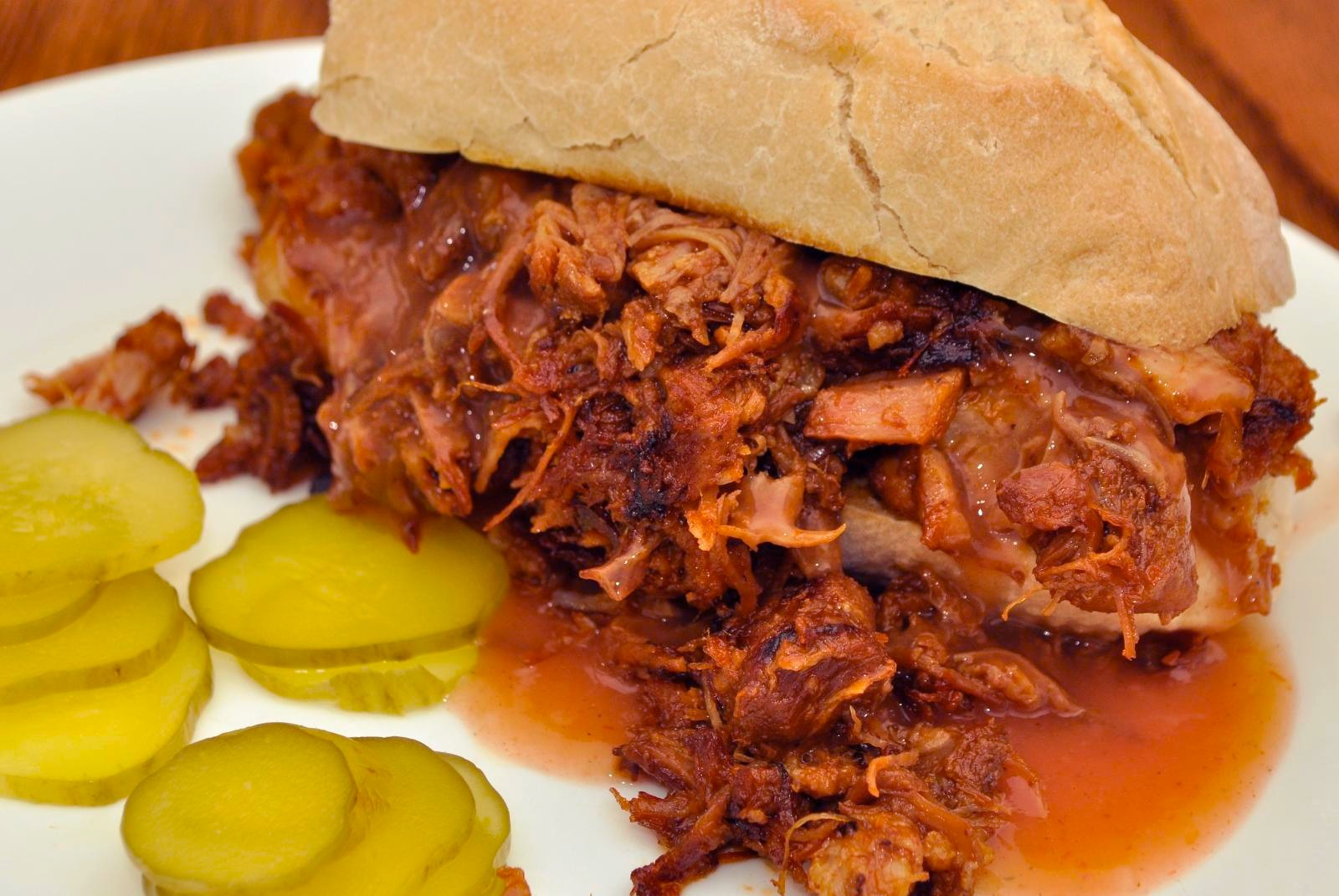
A barbecue sandwich served with pickled cucumber

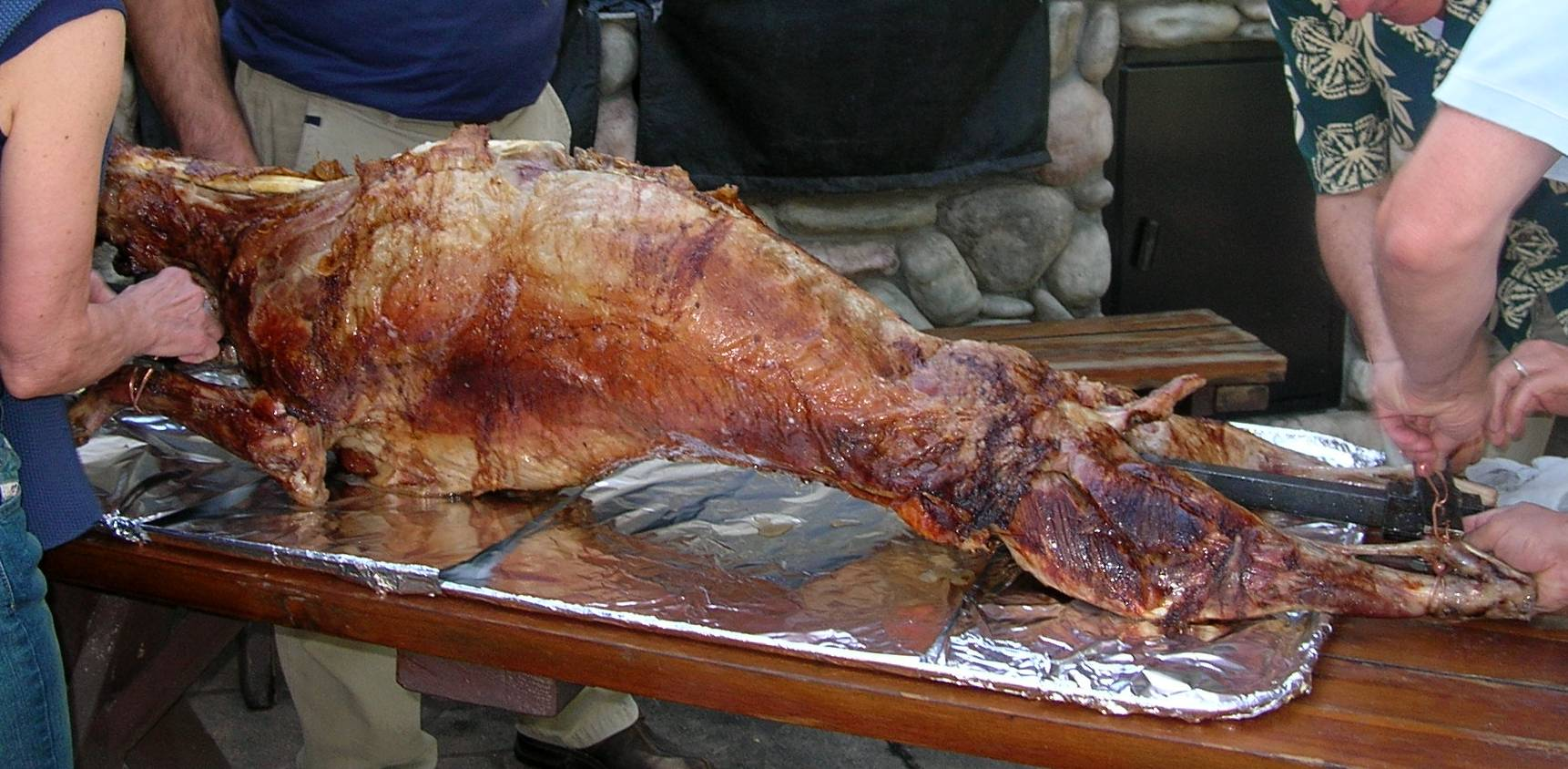
Prepared méchoui

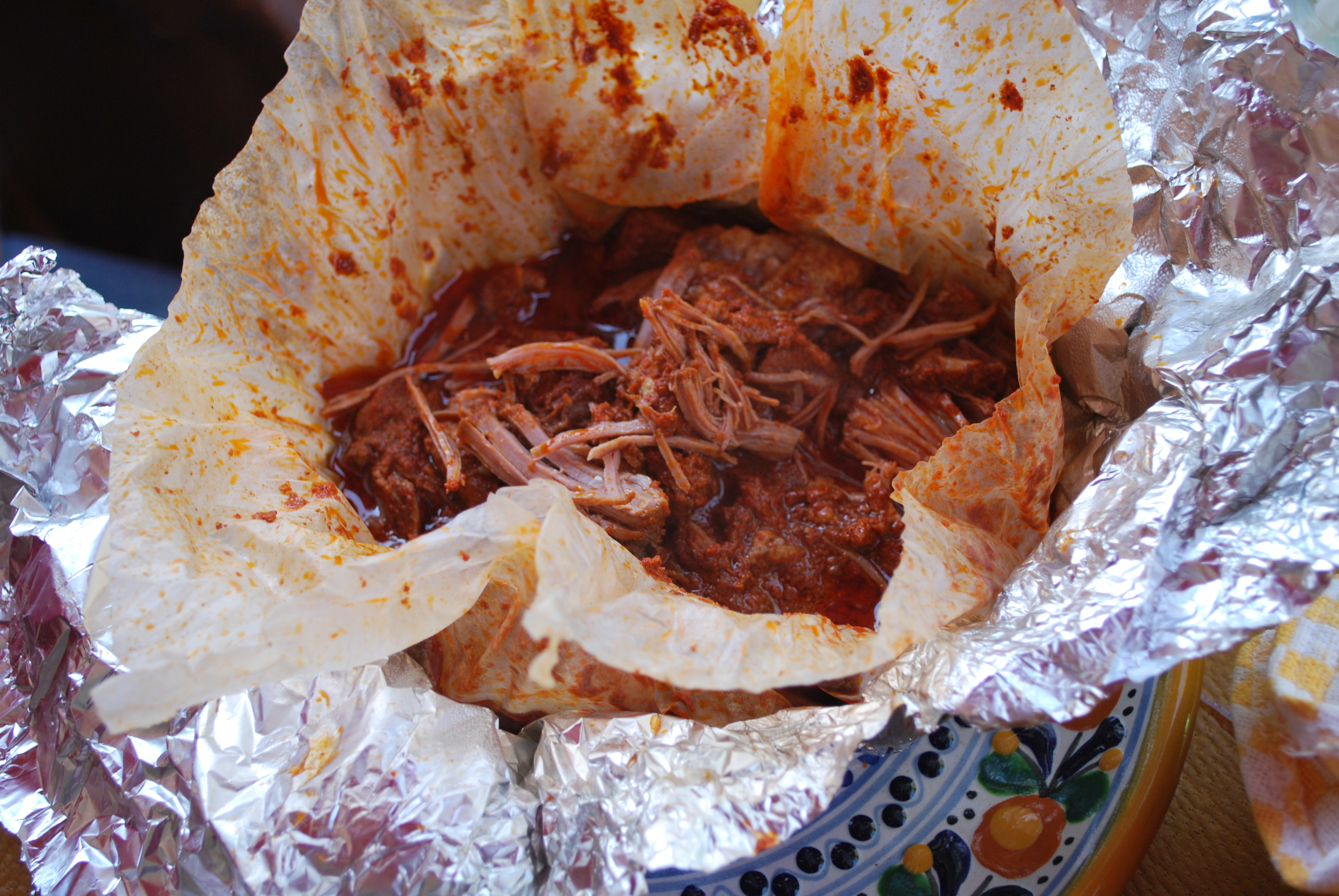
Mixed-meat mixiote

== See also ==
- Barbecue restaurant
- Barbecue sauce
- List of meat dishes
- List of smoked foods
- List of spit-roasted foods
- Regional variations of barbecue
