= Mu ping =

Street food in Thailand

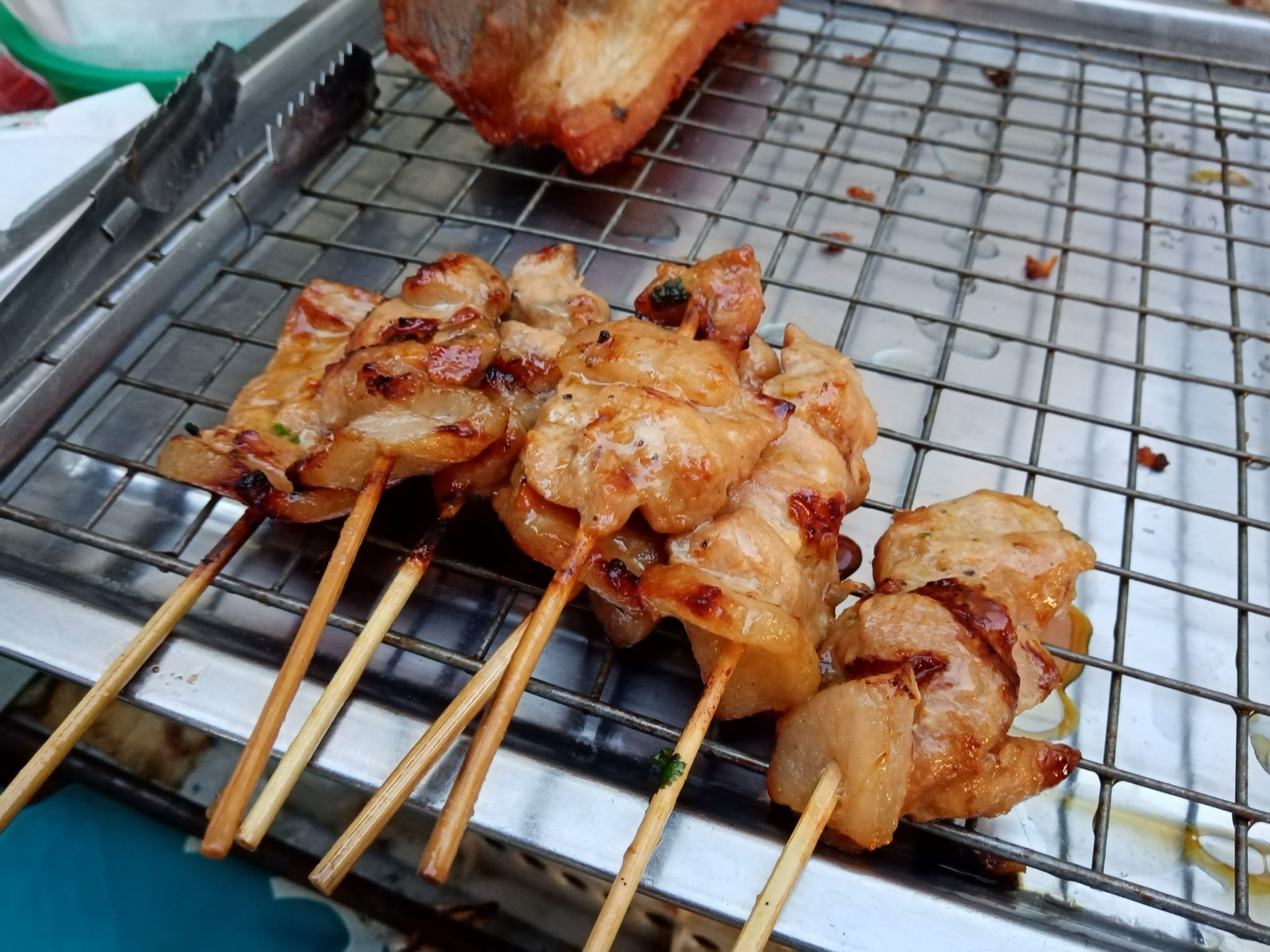
Mu ping in Bangkok

Mu ping or moo ping (Thai: หมูปิ้ง, pronounced [mǔː pîŋ]; Northeastern Thai: ปิ้งหมู, pronounced [pîŋ mǔː]; lit. 'grilled pork') is a kind of street food in Thailand. It gained popularity in 1952, when food transport carts were redesigned and turned into street vendor carts. Mu ping can be eaten for breakfast, lunch, or dinner. Mu ping is a common food to find in the streets of Thailand that usually start to sell around 5 am–11 am. Mu ping is eaten with sticky rice. The set of the meal comes as three skewers of mu ping and a package of sticky rice. The price per stick is around 5 - 10 Baht depending on pork prices.

== Ingredients ==
The ingredients needed to cook mu ping are:

- Pork: The main meat of the dish.
- Coriander roots: Used to increase aroma and reduce meat odors.
- Black pepper: Used to add the mild spiciness to the dish.
- Garlic: Used to add sweetness and spiciness to the dish, also enhance aroma.
- Fish sauce: Used to add saltiness to the dish.
- Palm sugar: Used to add sweetness to the dish.
- Soy sauce: Used as the main marinades for mu ping boran.
- Milk: Used as the main marinades for mu ping nom sod. Some mu ping variations use coconut milk in the marinade to give meat an extra creamy and rich flavor

== Preparation ==
There are two types of mu ping currently on the market: milk grilled and mu ping boran. Milk grilled is easier to find in some areas due to low cost and being more flavorful.

=== Thai-style (mu ping Boran) ===
This is the original type of mu ping. It is purely red meat with fat on the bottom of the skewer or with no fat. The pork is marinated in the mixture of coriander roots, black pepper, garlic, and soy sauce as the main marinade. Fish sauce and sugar can be added up to the preferences. The marinating process takes around 20 minutes. Then grilled over a charcoal BBQ. This type of mu ping is harder to find since the cost is higher because it is wholly pork with no other ingredients and the size is a lot smaller than milk-grilled mu ping.

=== Milk-grilled (mu ping nom sod) ===
This type of mu ping is very common in the street. The pork is also marinated in the mixture of coriander roots, black pepper, garlic, and milk as the main marinade instead. Fish sauce and sugar can be added up to the preferences. The milk is what caused the meat to be more tender and flavorful. The marinating process takes around 20 minutes. Then also grilled over a charcoal BBQ. Anyone can start selling milk-grilled mu ping as the premade are sold at supermarkets or shopping malls. Customers can find more flavors to choose from depending on the seller.

Both types of mu ping are usually served with sticky rice and sometimes Nam chim Chaeo. Which is a spicy sauce that complements grilled meat.

== Nutrition ==
The nutrition gets from 1 skewer containing:

=== Protein ===
Containing amino acids, high-protein foods are more nutrient. Thus, making it possible to consume food in reduced amounts in the long run. body weight will gradually decrease as well but consumers need to control carbohydrate intake properly.

=== Phosphorus ===
Phosphorus can help promote healthy gums and teeth and helps in the growth repair of the worn parts of the body. It also helps relieve pain from arthritis and contributes to the process of fat and starch metabolism. Which makes the body more energetic.

=== Vitamin B1 ===
Thiamine or vitamin B1 has the benefits of strengthening growth, digesting starchy foods as well maintain the nervous system, muscles, and heart to function normally.

== Health ==
Mu ping is grilled meat, it has a group of chemicals called Polycyclic Aromatic Hydrocarbons (PAHs) that are also linked to cancers. PAHs are produced during pyrolysis and incomplete burning of organic materials such as wood, coal, and oil. It will form when the meat juices drip onto the coals or other heating surfaces and flare up in flames and smoke. The grill rack used in the stove often has burned-up pieces that are stuck on the grill. Common grilling methods (using either charcoal or gas fuel) could produce PAHs in food and contamination has been reported in different food products such as cereals, vegetables, fruits, dairy products, oils, coffee, tea, and meat products. In comparison to gas grilling, charcoal grilling led to significantly higher contents of PAHs in all types of Skewer, which could be the result of incomplete charcoal burning.

== See also ==
- Kai yang
- List of pork dishes
- List of street foods
- Thai cuisine
