= Kai yang =

Lao-Thai grilled chicken

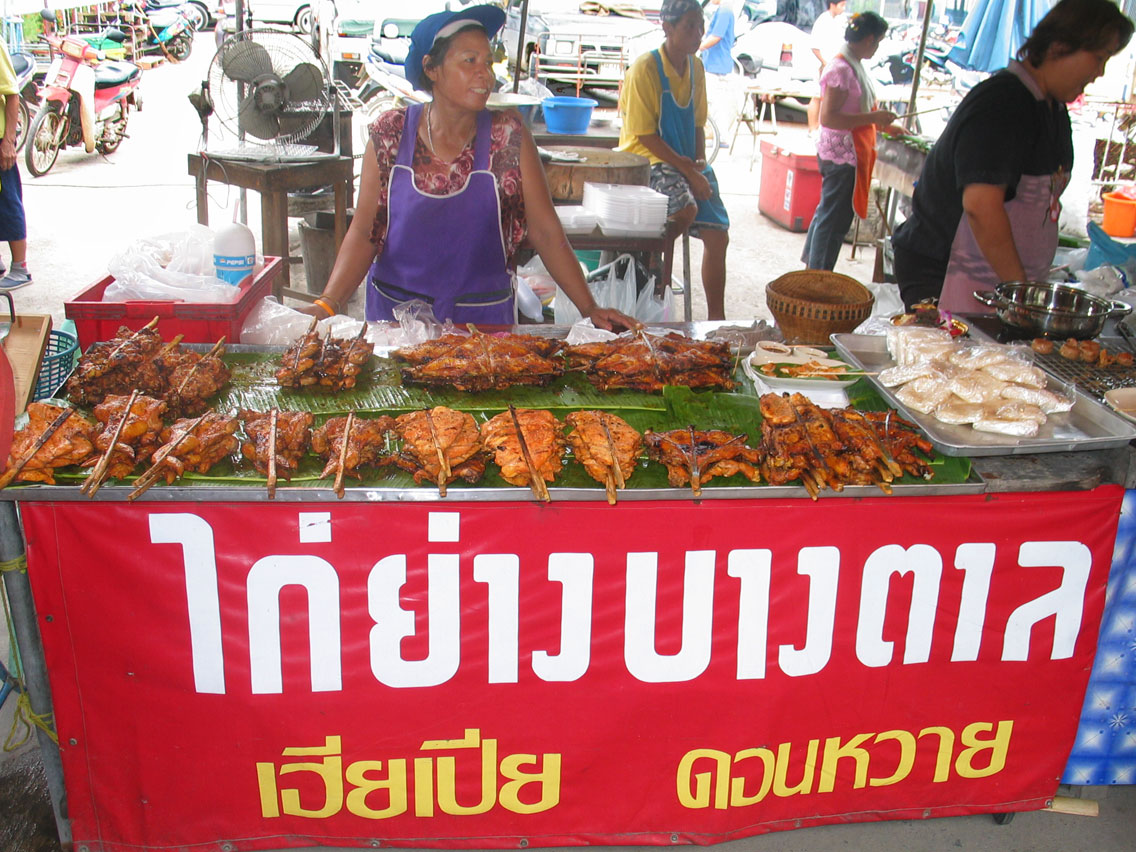
- Kai yang at the old market of Don Wai, Nakhon Pathom
- Region or state: Southeast Asia
- Associated cuisine: Lao, Thai

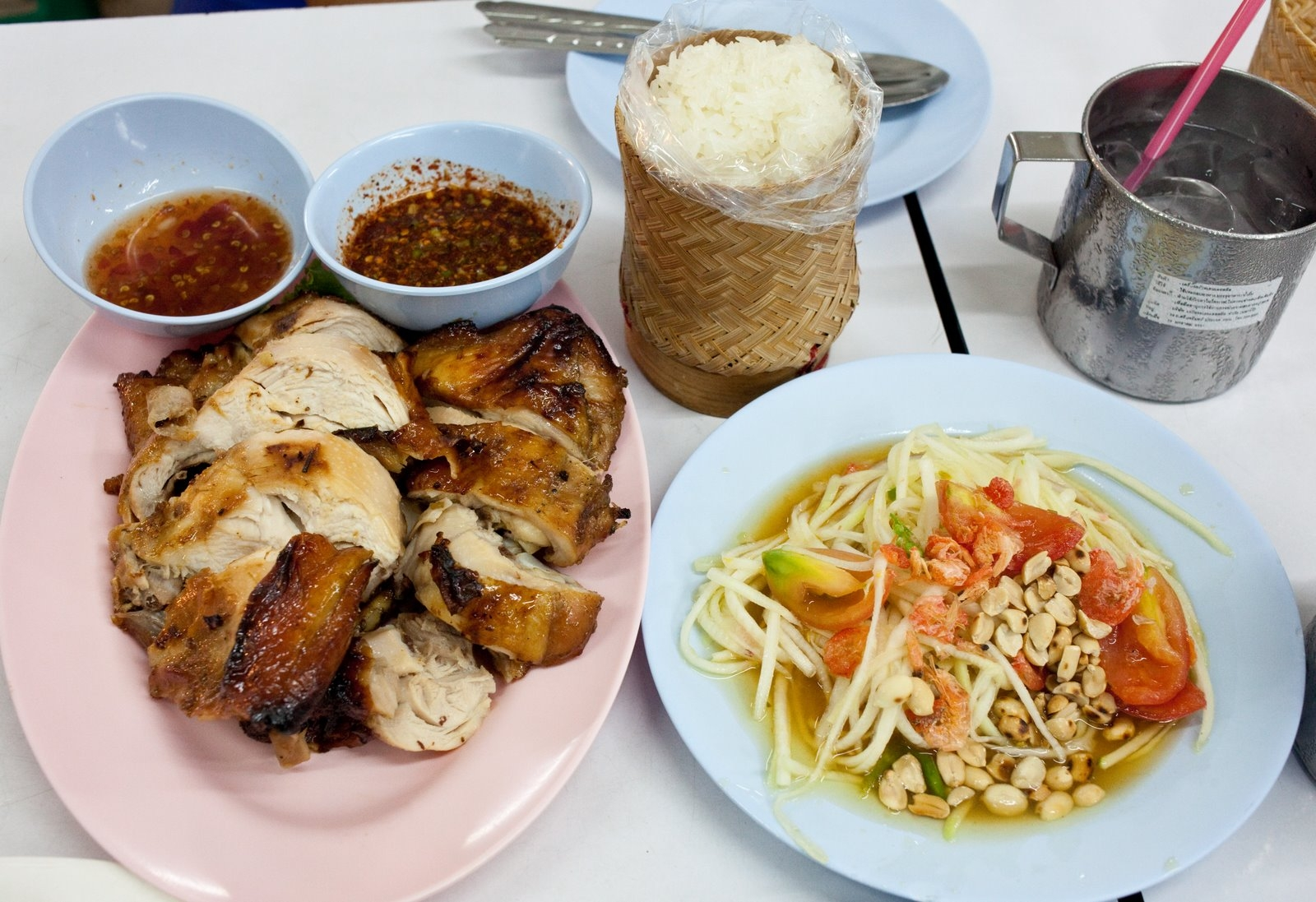
Som tam, khao niao and kai yang in an Isan-style restaurant in Bangkok, Thailand.

Ping kai and khao lam sold on roadsides in Vientiane, Laos.

Kai yang or gai yang (Thai: ไก่ย่าง, pronounced [kàj jâːŋ], lit. 'grilled chicken'), also known as kai ping or gai ping (Thai: ไก่ปิ้ง), or pīng kai (Lao: ປີ້ງໄກ່, [pîːŋ kāj]), is a dish of shared origin from Lao and Thai peoples commonly eaten throughout the regions of both Laos and Thailand. The dish is a standard staple of street markets and readily available at all times. The town of Seno in Savannakhet, Laos is renowned for its flavorful and tender Ping kai Xeno or Xeno grilled chicken; the dish has earned official recognition as Savannakhet's symbol and culinary legacy. Ping kai Xeno is also a National One District One Product (ODOP) Trademark. The Association of Xeno Grilled Chicken, formed in 2016, has developed a comprehensive set of rules and regulations for all Ping kai Xeno to protect its economic interests and culinary tradition. They include the requirement that all Ping kai Xeno be prepared using only chicken from the Xeno areas and its unique marinating and grilling techniques. Being a typical Laotian dish, it is often paired with green papaya salad and sticky rice (Thai/Isan: ข้าวเหนียว, pronounced [kʰâ(ː)w.nǐaw]; Lao: ເຂົ້າໜຽວ, pronounced [kʰȁ(ː)w.nǐaw]) or eaten with sticky rice in bamboo (khao lam in Lao). It is also eaten with raw vegetables, and often dipped in spicy sauces such as Laotian jaew bong.

In Thailand, there are also many famous Thai Muslim varieties of kai yang which are not of Lao origin at all, but more akin to the grilled chicken from Malaysia.

== Names ==
The Laotian name for the dish is pīng kai (ປີ້ງໄກ່) and means "roast chicken". In Laotian restaurants in the West, it is known as "Laotian barbecued chicken" or "ping gai". The Thai and Isaan term is usually spelled ไก่ย่าง (kai yang; Isan: [káj ɲāːŋ]), although ปิ้งไก่ (ping kai; Isan: [pîŋ káj]), a Thai letter rendering of the Laotian name, would be understood in Isan and most of Thailand as well although to Thai ears it would sound a bit quaint, due to the slight grammatical difference between Thai and Laotian. Thais would put kai before ping rather than the other way round. In the West, where this dish often features on the menu of Thai restaurants, it is either known by its Thai name kai yang or as "Thai barbecued chicken".

== Ingredients and preparation ==
A whole chicken is often halved and pounded flat. It is marinated and then grilled over a low heat on a charcoal flame for a long time, but is not cooked to be burnt or dry. The marinade typically includes fish sauce, garlic, turmeric, coriander root (cilantro), and white pepper. Many variations exist, and it is also quite common to find black soy sauce, hoisin sauce, shallots, leaves and seeds of coriander, lemongrass, chilis, ginger, vinegar, palm sugar, and MSG.

== See also ==
- List of barbecue dishes
- List of chicken dishes
- List of street foods
- Mu ping
