= Méchoui =

Spit-roasted whole lamb or sheep

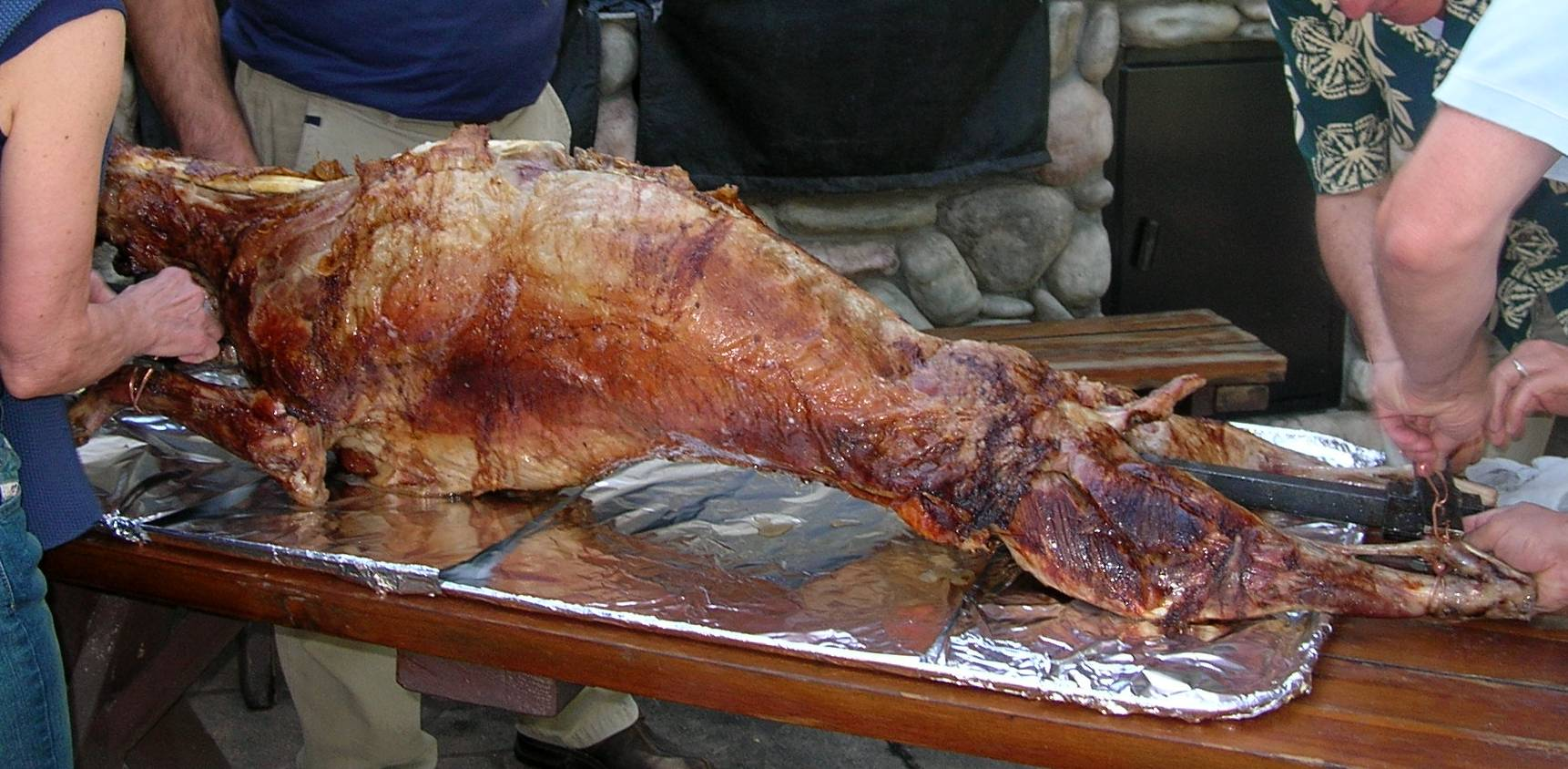
Méchoui

Méchoui (Arabic: مشوي) or meshwi is a whole sheep or lamb spit-roasted on a barbecue in Maghrebi cuisine. The word comes from the Arabic word šawā (شواء, "grilling, roasting"). This dish is common in North Africa. In Algeria and Morocco, the term méchoui "refers to the method of cooking a lamb or a sheep cooked whole on the spit". In Tunisia it applies to any piece of meat or fish grilled with embers.

== Preparation ==
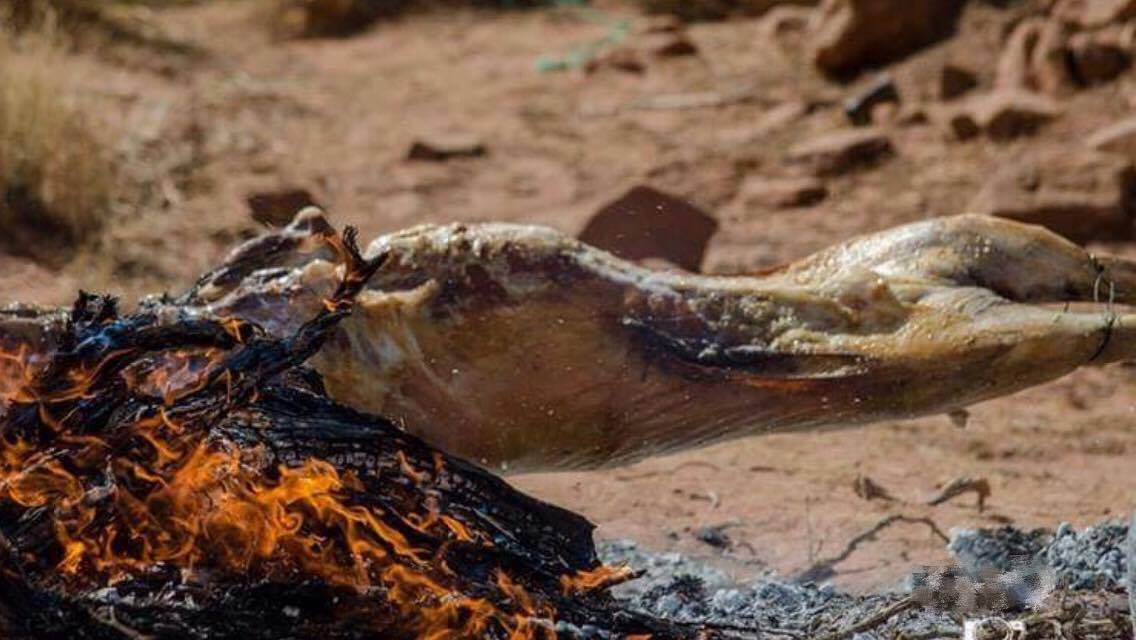
Méchoui roasting over a wood fire

After having slaughtered and dismembered the young lamb, all the internal organs of the animal are removed from the body cavity, with the exception of the kidneys. This cavity is stitched after being sprinkled with spices, particularly ras el hanout. The lamb is skewered on a tree branch and cooked next to a pile of embers. The spindle is rotated slowly and evenly so as to ensure evenly distributed cooking.

The prepared lamb is not placed directly above the embers, for the melting fat could ignite and char the outer flesh. The cooking is started gently, so that the interior cooks almost at the same time as the outside. During cooking, the meat is brushed with melted butter or oil, to make it crispy. Gradually, the lamb is brought close to the hot embers, so that the flesh takes on an amber color. The cooking time varies according to the weight of the animal, typically about a quarter of an hour per kilogram.

== Presentation ==
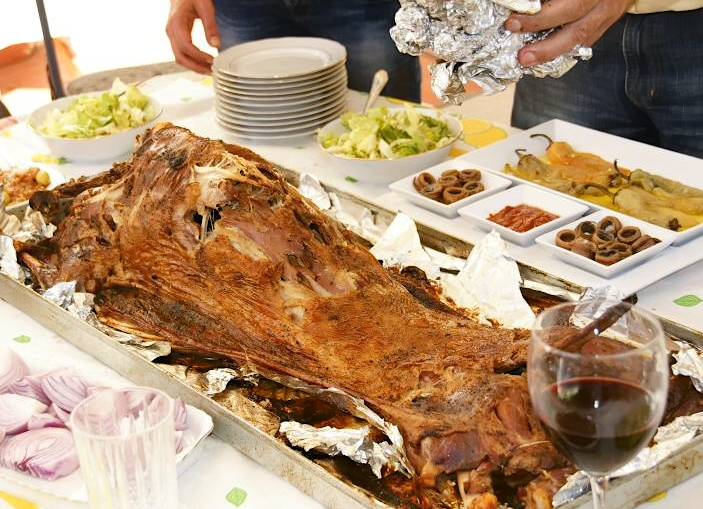
A méchoui buffet

Méchoui is a dish served at the beginning of the meal, as part of a feast or diffa. With the fingers of the right hand, the host takes pieces of grilled meat and offers them to guests. Traditionally, no cutlery is used to serve a méchoui, because, due to the slow cooking, the meat should be able to detach without any effort.

The nomadic populations, in addition to their main herd often composed of several thousand sheep, raise a small number of male lambs specifically for méchoui, feeding them with cheih, a species of wild mugwort which gives the lamb a distinctive character.

== Regional variations ==
Méchoui is prepared, especially in Morocco, by digging a vertical hole, or by constructing an earthen oven, 0.8 to 1 meter in diameter and 1.5 to 2 meters deep. Wood is stacked in this cavity and burns for five or six hours. When the earth surrounding the hole is smoking and the wood is transformed into embers and ashes, most of it is removed to avoid flare-ups. The prepared lamb is added to the oven vertically and enclosed with a lid covered with clay, mud, or wet sand, sealing the lid as well as possible. Cooking lasts four to five hours. When the lamb is done, the hardened cover is broken to remove the lamb from the oven.

== Serving ==
Traditionally, méchoui is served with cumin and salt, either on a plate or in a decorative serving dish. The diners sprinkle salt and cumin to taste on the lamb before eating.

== See also ==
- List of Middle Eastern dishes
- List of African dishes
- List of barbecue dishes
- List of lamb dishes
- List of spit-roasted foods
