= Sticky rice in bamboo =

South and Southeast Asian rice dish

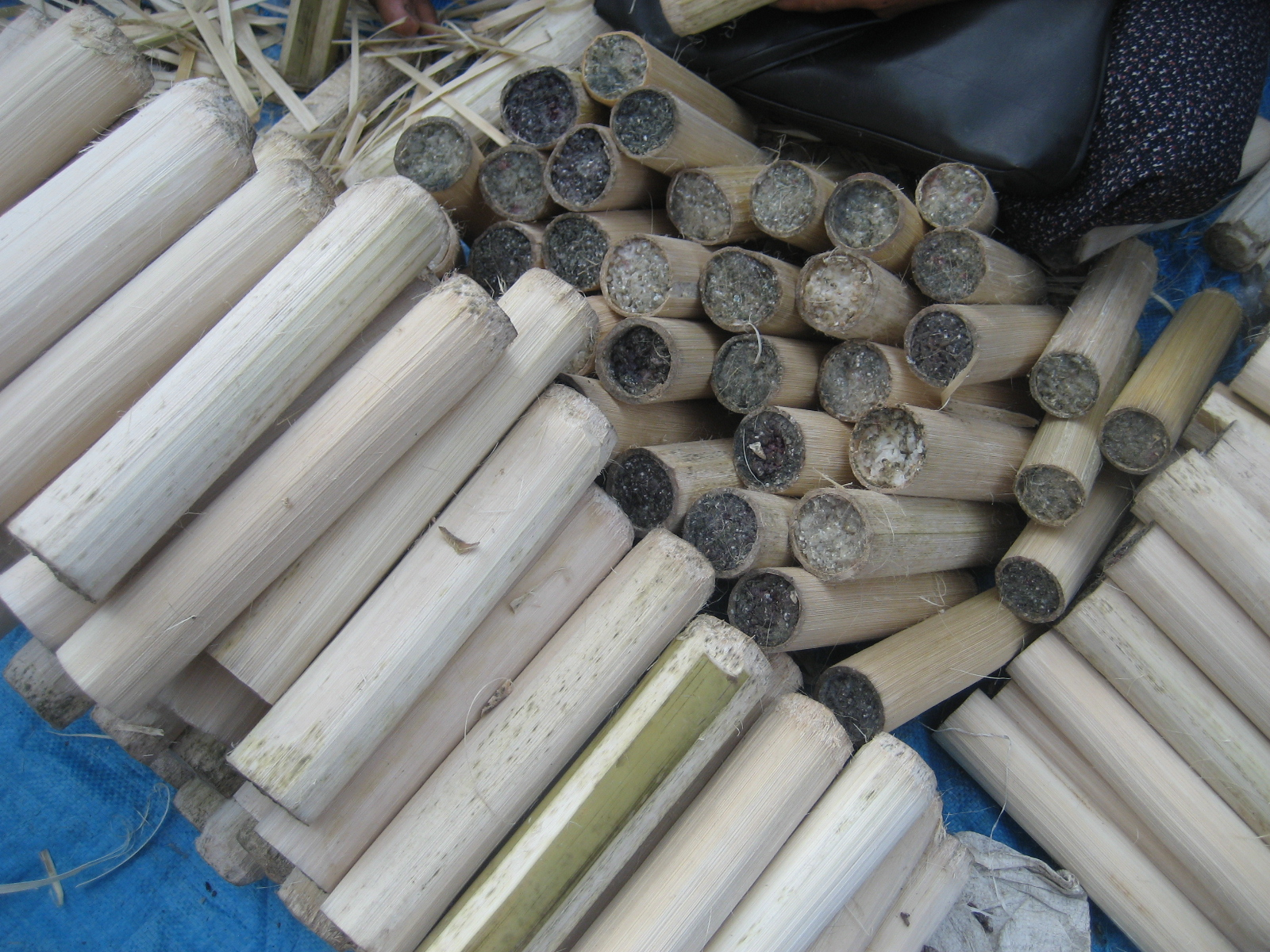
- Burmese sticky rice in bamboo
- Region or state: Southeast Asia and South Asia
- Associated cuisine: Burmese, Cambodian, Lao, Thai, Vietnamese, Assamese
- Main ingredients: Glutinous rice, hollow bamboo tubes
- Similar dishes: Lemang, Daetong-bap, Chunga Pitha

Sticky rice in bamboo is a common Southeast Asian dish consisting of glutinous rice roasted inside specially prepared bamboo sections of different diameters and lengths. It is consumed both as a savory food and as a sweet dessert.

== Names ==
The dish is known by various names throughout Southeast and South Asia, including Chunga Pitha in Assamese, paung din (ပေါင်းတင်း) or kauk hnyin kyi dauk (ကောက်ညှင်းကျည်တောက်) in Burmese, kralan (ក្រឡាន) in Khmer, and khao lam (ข้าวหลาม, pronounced [kʰâw lǎːm]; ເຂົ້າຫລາມ, pronounced [kʰȁw lǎːm]) in Lao and Thai and cơm lam in Vietnamese. In Lao and Thai, khao means rice and lam means the cooking process, which involves roasting the contents in prepared bamboo sections, while in Vietnamese cơm lam translates as "bamboo cooked rice".

In Malaysia and Indonesia, it known as lemang, which is typically eaten during Eid-ul-Fitr celebrations, where it can be eaten with rendang. In the Philippines, this is known as binungey.

== Variations ==
=== Cambodia ===
Kralan sold on the roadside in Cambodia

In Cambodia, sticky rice in bamboo is called kralan (ក្រឡាន). It is made by roasting a mixture of glutinous rice, black-eyed peas or beans, coconut milk, grated coconut and palm sugar in bamboo tubes over a fire for around 90 minutes. Kralan is often eaten at Chinese and Khmer New Year. According to archeological evidence, rice has been cooked in bamboo already by the Mon-Khmer tribes and in Khmer Empire kralan was used as military rations, which has led historian Dr. Michel Tranet to conclude that the method of roasting sticky rice in bamboo tubes in Thailand originated with the Khmer people of Surin, an area of Thailand once part of the Khmer Empire. Thma Krae village in Kratie Province and Samrong Khnong village in Battambang Province have become well known for their sticky rice in bamboo.

During harvest season, Cambodian Buddhists in the Angkor region celebrate a particular nocturn rite during which local peasants lay down next to each other in what is called a plang kralan (ប្លុងក្រឡាន) as sticky rice bamboo being grilled to form a human bridge on which the Buddhist monks walk in order to obtain merits and hope of an abundant harvest.

=== Laos ===
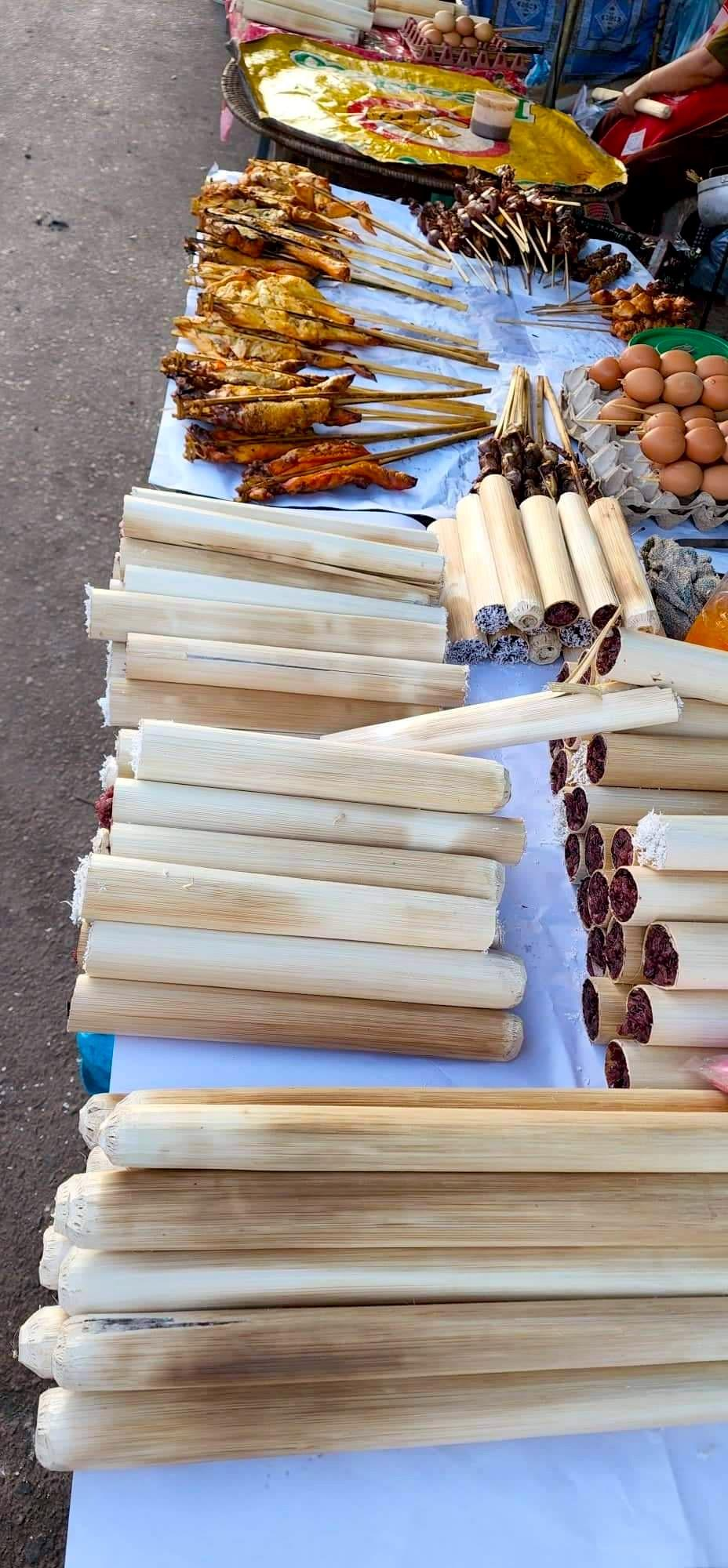
Khao lam and ping kai sold on roadsides in Laos

Sticky rice is ingrained in the national culinary heritage and figures in religious traditions of the Lao people. Since ancient time Lao people used sticky rice to prepare Khao Lam for both feasting and offering to monks. Today, Lao Khao Lam may be made with white or purple (khao kum) sticky rice mixed with coconut cream, beans, small pieces of taro or sweet potato. It can be consumed as a sweet or a festival and celebration food that is frequently served with Lao grilled chicken ping kai. Khao lam and Ping Kai are so popular they are sold on roadsides in Laos.

=== Myanmar (Burma) ===
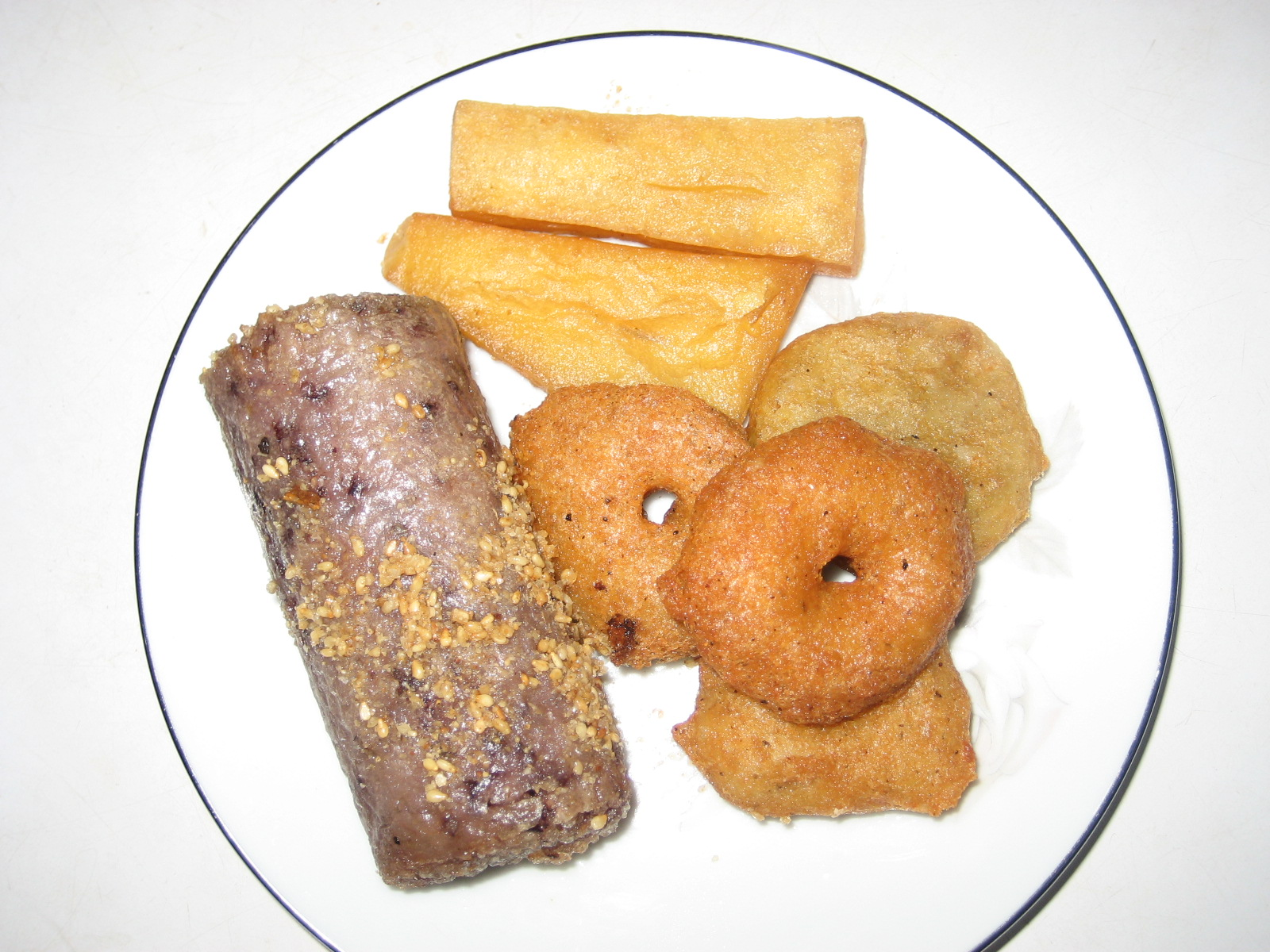
Paung din and Burmese fritters are common breakfast foods in Myanmar (Burma).

Paung din (ပေါင်းတင်း) or kaukhnyin kyidauk (ကောက်ညှင်းကျည်တောက်) is another ready-to-eat portable form cooked in a segment of bamboo. When the bamboo is peeled off, a thin skin remains around the rice, and it also gives off a distinctive aroma.

=== Thailand ===
Khao lam uses sticky rice with red beans, sugar, grated coconut, and coconut milk. It can be prepared with white or dark purple (khao niao dam) varieties of glutinous rice. Sometimes described as a "cake", thick khao lam containers may have a filling of coconut custard in the center that is made from coconut cream, egg, and sugar. Khao lam can be consumed as savory food or dessert. It is a cultural food and is an OTOP product. Moreover, Thai people present khao lam to monks to make merit. Further, it is gradually becoming a Thai tradition.

In the past, Thailand had innumerable bamboo trees. Thai people thought about the utility of using bamboo for cooking purposes. The ingredients of khao lam are glutinous rice, black beans, coconut milk, sugar and salt. Moreover, taro or young coconut may be added.

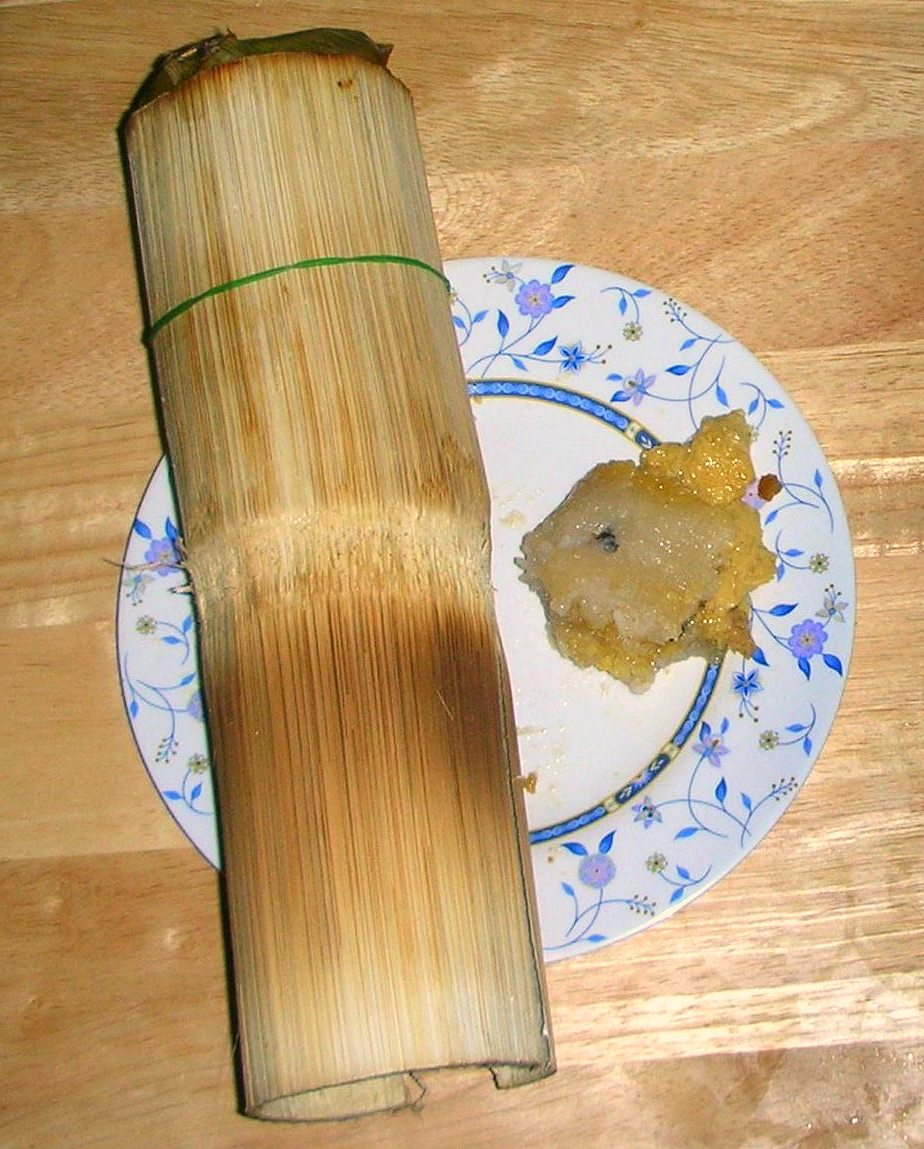
Khao lam with coconut custard

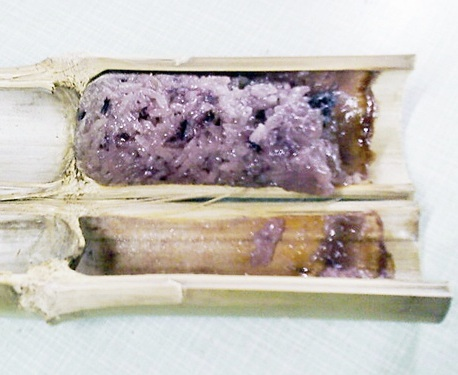
An opened khao lam with purple sticky rice

=== Vietnam ===
In Vietnam, it is called cơm lam and found in the Northwest Mountainous Area. It originated when mountain people, such as the Tai peoples, would prepare for long journeys by pressing wet rice (cơm) with added salt, into bamboo tubes, and cooking. Cơm lam is also served in Central Highlands food stalls with chicken.

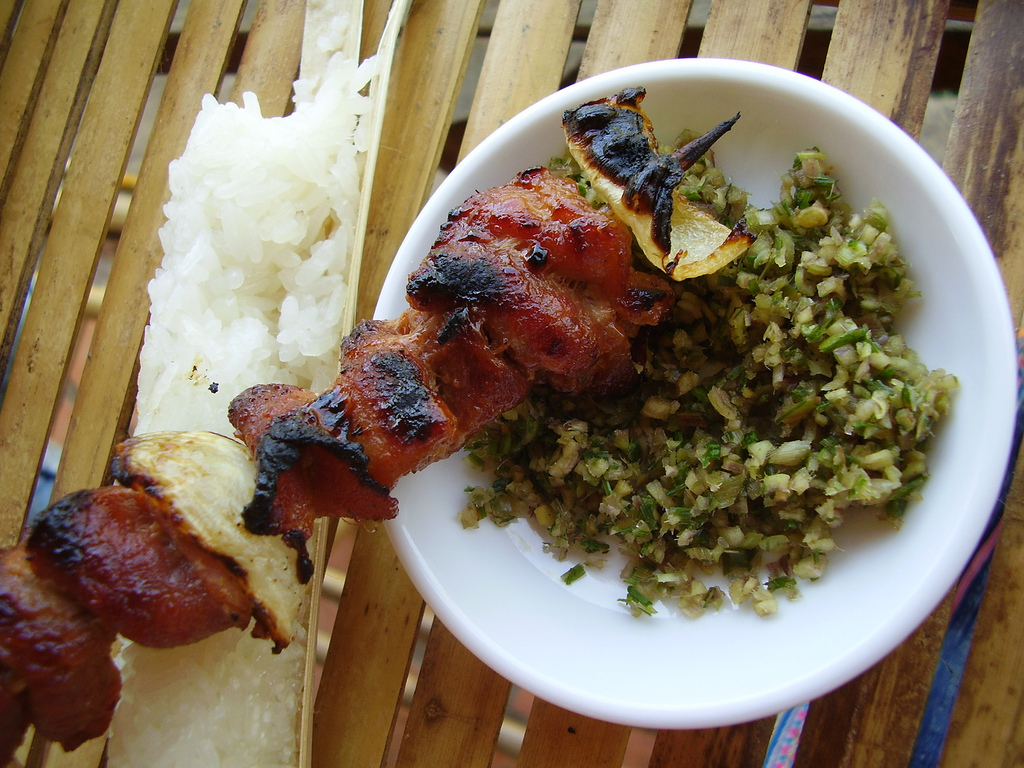
Cơm lam from the Central Highlands

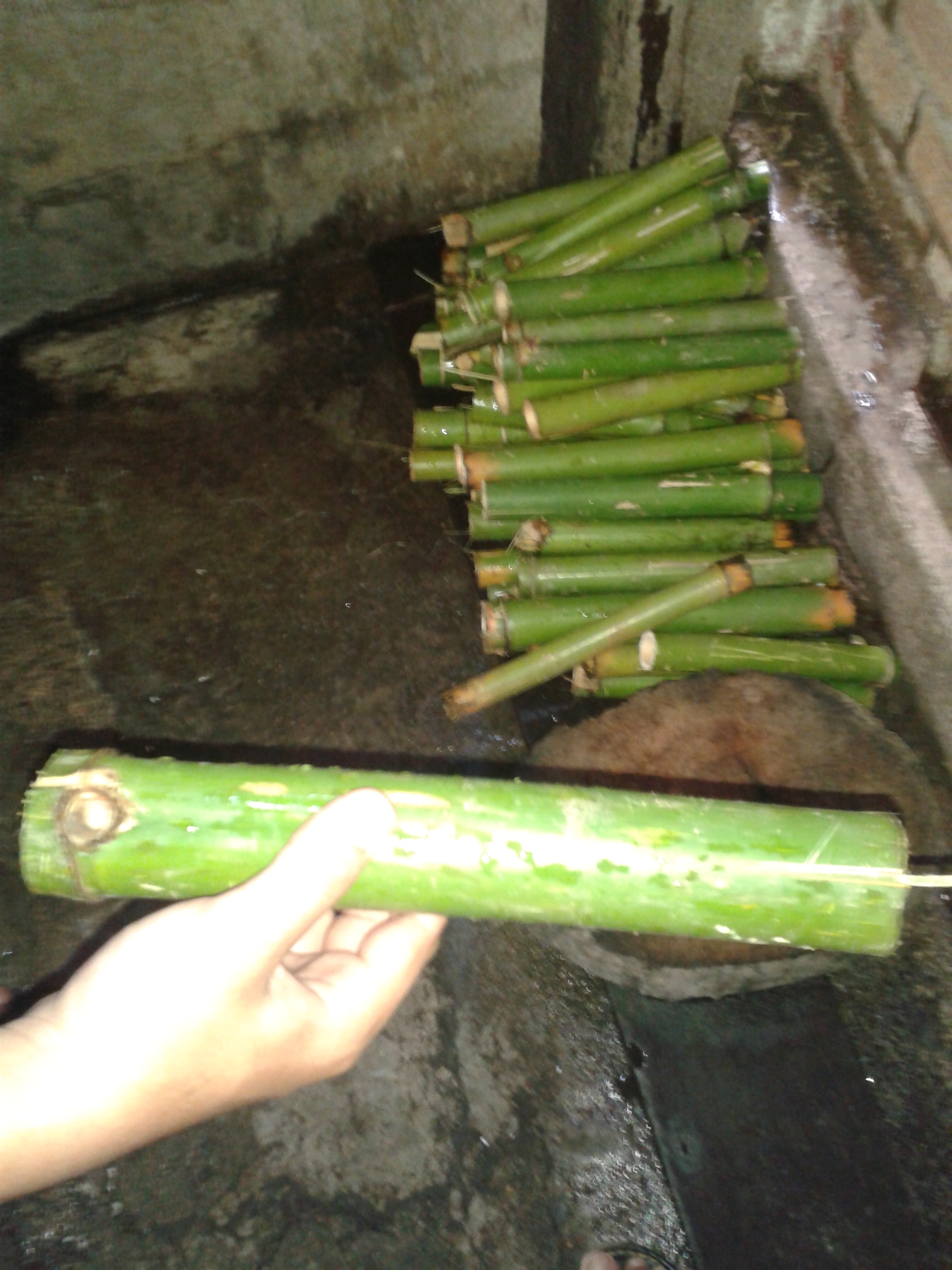
Cơm lam before grilling

== See also ==
- Daetong-bap
- Lemang
