= Daetong-bap =

Korean dish of rice steamed in bamboo

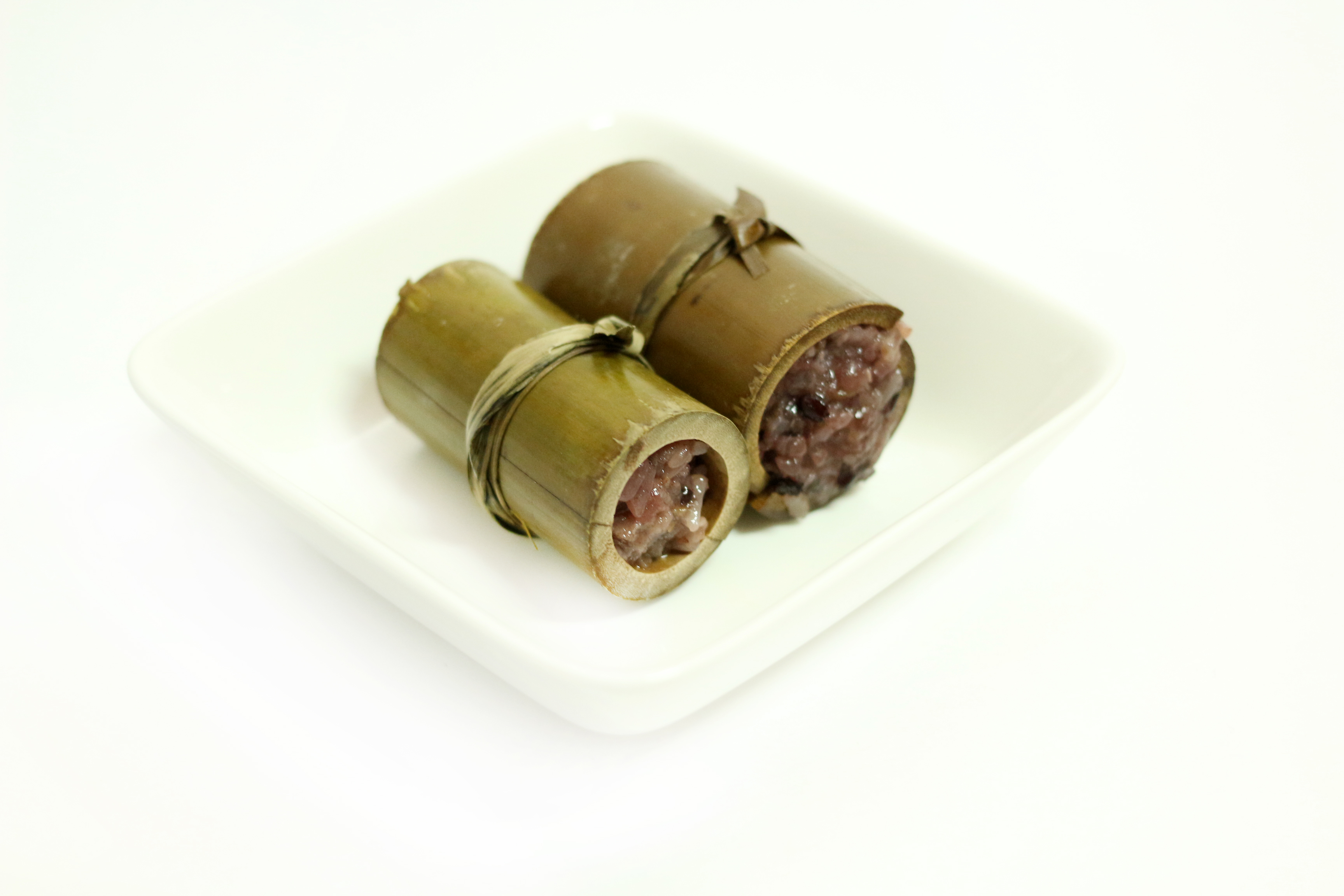

Korean name
- Hangul: 대통밥
- RR: daetongbap
- MR: taet'ongbap

Alternate name
- Hangul: 죽통밥
- RR: juktongbap
- MR: chukt'ongbap

Daetong-bap (Korean: 대통밥) or juktong-bap (죽통밥) is a South Korean dish consisting of rice mixed with various nuts, beans, and grains steamed in bamboo. This imparts the fragrance from the bamboo into the rice. The mixed rice is then eaten out of the bamboo.

The dish is native to Damyang, South Jeolla Province. Damyang grows the most bamboo plants in Korea. Bamboo grown for more than 3 years is best suited for daetong-bap, and it is recommended to use bamboo only once to impart the most fragrance possible into the rice.

== Gallery ==
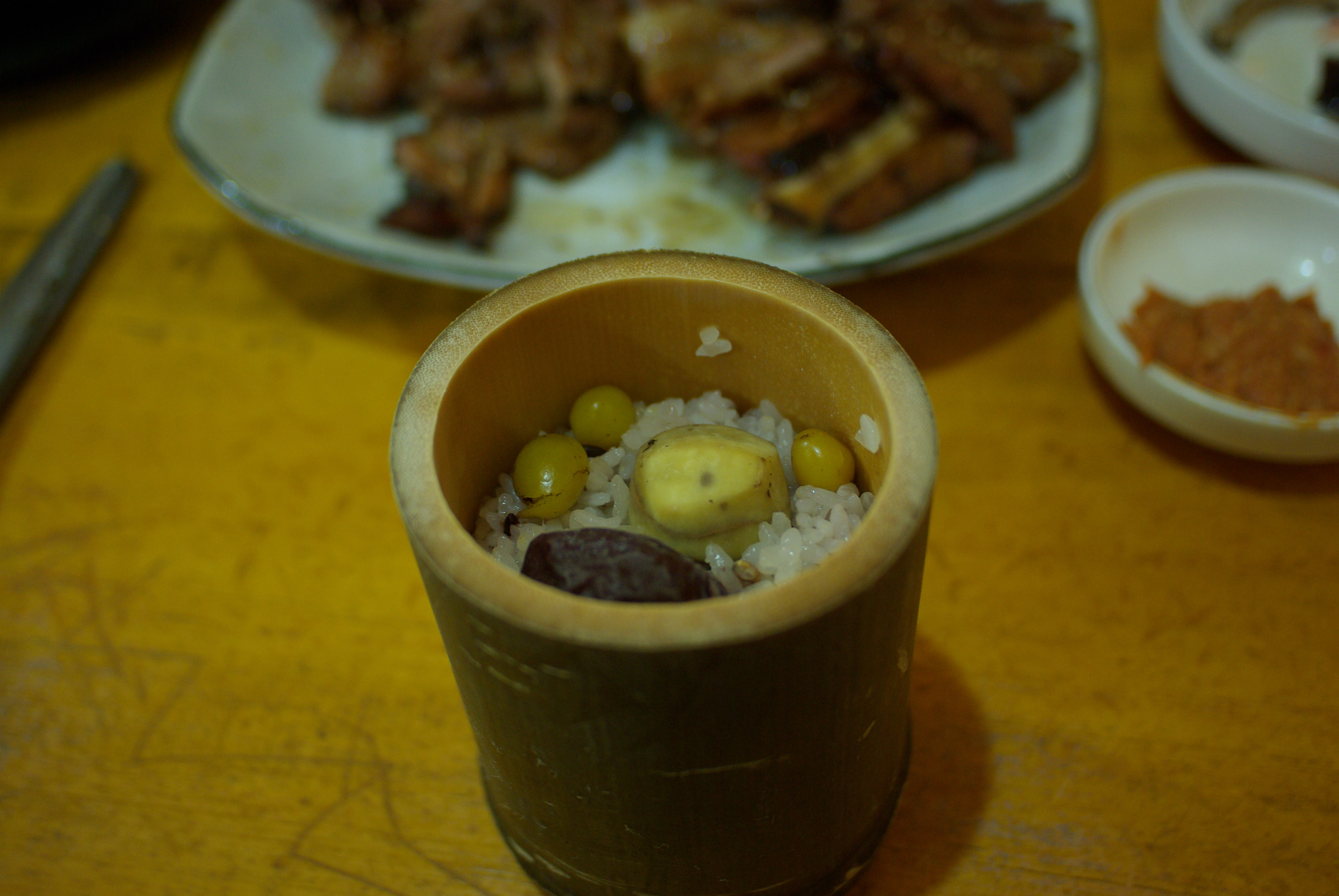
Daetong-bap, with mixed nuts visible

== See also ==
- Khao lam
- Kralan
